= Bastetodon =

Bastetodon Temporal range: Early Oligocene (Rupelian), ~30 Ma

Scientific classification
- Kingdom: Animalia
- Phylum: Chordata
- Class: Mammalia
- Order: †Hyaenodonta
- Family: †Hyainailouridae
- Subfamily: †Hyainailourinae
- Genus: †Bastetodon; Al-Ashqar et al., 2025
- Species: †B. syrtos

Binomial name
- †Bastetodon syrtos (Holroyd, 1999)

Synonyms
- Pterodon syrtos (Holroyd, 1999)

Extinct genus of hyaenodont mammals

Bastetodon (meaning "Bastet tooth") is an extinct genus of carnivorous hyaenodont mammal from the Early Oligocene Jebel Qatrani Formation of Egypt. The genus contains single species, B. syrtos, which was originally assigned to the genus Pterodon. It was a medium-sized hyaenodont, with an estimated body mass ranging around 18–36 kg (40–79 lb).

== Discovery and naming ==
In 1999, paleontologist Patricia A. Holroyd described a partial right maxilla from 'Quarry M' of the Jebel Qatrani Formation near the Faiyum Oasis of Egypt as belonging to a new species of Pterodon, P. syrtos. The specific name, syrtos, is a Greek word meaning "carried along by a stream", referencing the preservation of the holotype in a point bar depositional environment.

In 2025, Al-Ashqar and colleagues revised the record of African species assigned to Pterodon, a historic wastebasket taxon. As in previous analyses, they observed that the species referred to this genus form a polyphyletic assemblage. Based on a more recently-collected complete skull from 'Quarry I', they established a new genus, Bastetodon, for "P." syrtos. The generic name combines a reference to Bastet—a cat-headed goddess from Ancient Egyptian mythology associated with protection, pleasure, and good health—with the Greek suffix "-odon", meaning "tooth". The authors' intended translation is "teeth like the cat-headed goddess".

== Classification ==
Using an expanded matrix from previous phylogenetic analyses, Al-Ashqar et al. (2025) recovered "P." syrtos as the sister taxon to the smaller and roughly coeval Falcatodon within the hyaenodontan subfamily Hyainailourinae. Their results are displayed in the cladogram below:

- Hyainailourinae
  - Orienspterodon dahkoensis
  - - - Kerberos langebadreae
      - Pterodon dasyuroides
    - - - Hemipsalodon
        - - Akhnatenavus leptognathus
          - Akhnatenavus nefertiticyon
      - - - Sekhmetops africanus
          - Sekhmetops phiomensis
        - - Paroxyaena sp.
          - - Thereutherium
            - - - Sectisodon markgrafi
                - - - Namasector soriae
                    - Prionogale breviceps
                  - - - Leakitherium hiwegi
                      - Mlanyama sugu
                    - - - Exiguodon pilgrimi
                        - Metapterodon kaiseri
                      - - Ekweeconfractus amorui
                        - Isohyaenodon zadoki
              - - - Bastetodon syrtos
                  - Falcatodon schlosseri
                - - - Hyainailouros sulzeri
                    - Megistotherium
                  - - Simbakubwa
                    - - Hyainailouros napakensis
                      - - Hyainailouros nyanzae
                        - - Isohyaenodon andrewsi
                          - - Hyainailouros bugtiensis
                            - Sivapterodon lahirii

== Description ==
=== Size ===
The body mass of hyaenodonts is problematic as the sister-taxon of the order remains unresolved. The body mass of Bastetodon was based on Van Valkenburgh (1990) regression of total skull length (SKL) and the distance from the orbital condyles to the anterior orbit (OOL). Based on the regressions, Bastetodon could’ve weighed 18–36 kg (40–79 lb), based on OOL and SKL respectively, with a mean body mass of 27 kg (60 lb).

=== Skull and dentition ===
The skull of Bastetodon was not only the most complete of any hyaenodont from the Jebel Qatrani Formation, but also the most best preserved of any Paleogene Afro-Arabian hypercarnivore. Compared to Pterodon dasyuroides, Bastetodon differs primarily in the reduction of the tooth row and absence of P1 and M3. It also had a more robust cranium with an anteroposteriorly shorter neurocranium, a laterally broader posterior brain case, and a shorter rostrum that had less constriction by the infraorbital foramina.

== Paleobiology and paleoecology ==
=== Predatory behavior ===
The long, shearing metastyles and the reduced and mesially shifted protocones suggests Bastetodon had a hypercarnivorous diet. The loss of P1 and M3 suggests Bastetodon also had a powerful bite force. The loss of these teeth reduces the length of the rostrum and mandible, yielding a shorter level arm for adduction.

=== Paleoecology ===
Bastetodon was found within upper Jebel Qatrani Formation of Egypt of the Early Oligocene. It was thought to have been a subtropical to tropical swamp being comparable to that of freshwater habitats in Central Africa. Based on sediments, there was likely a river system of channels that emptied west towards the Tethys. The climate was likely seasonal, and potentially monsoonal.
