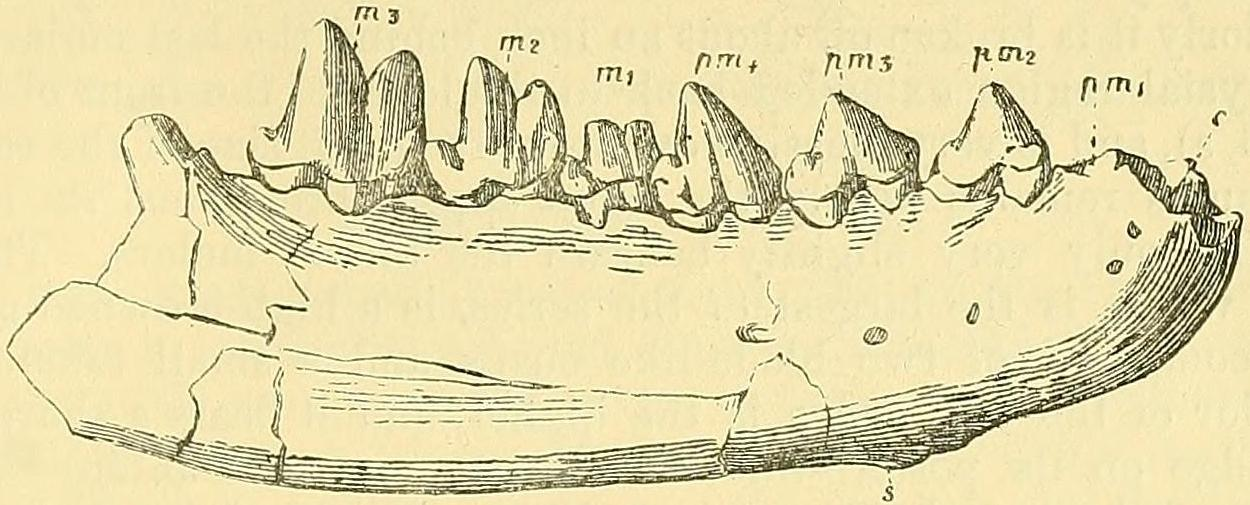
- Illustration of the S. africanus holotype
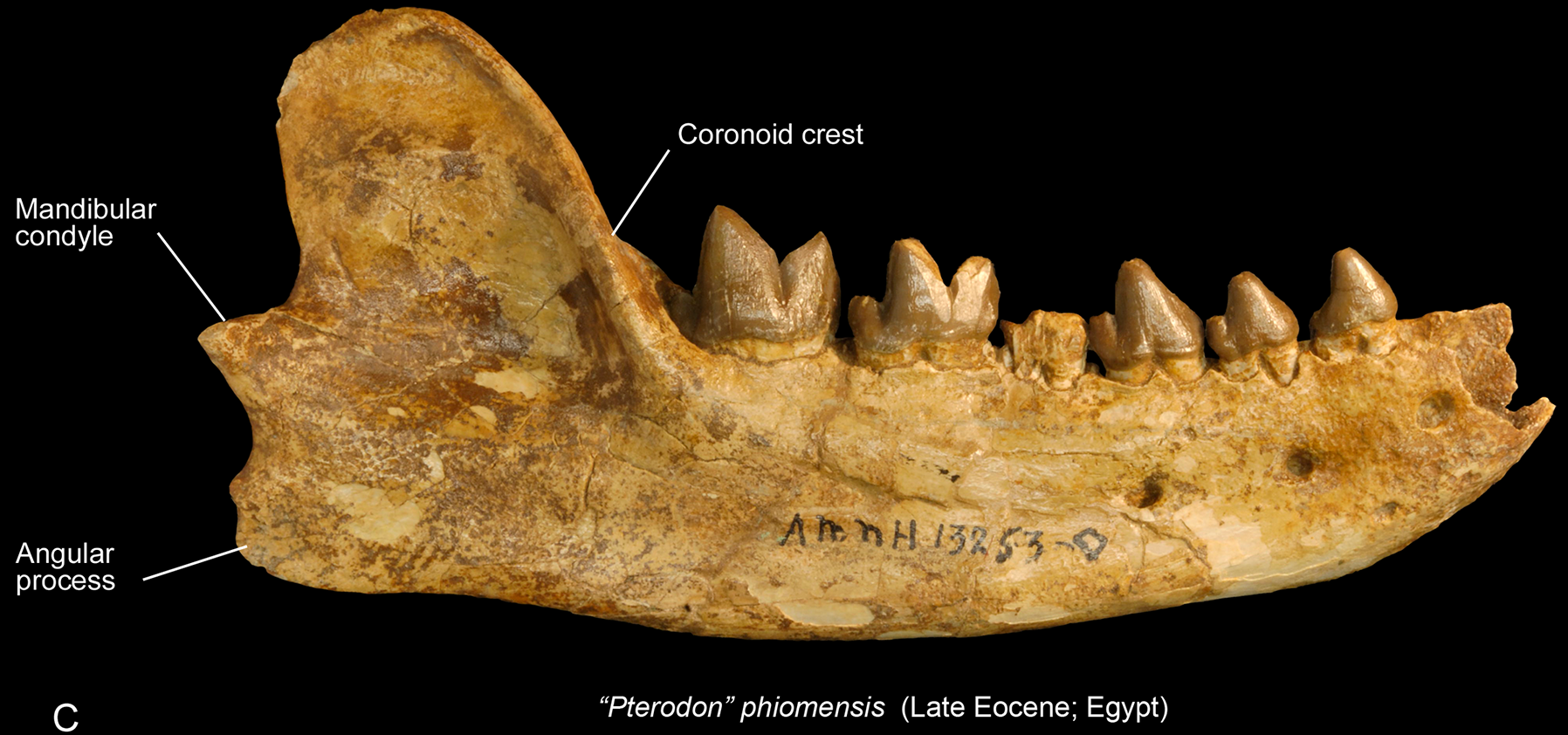
- Photo of the S. phiomensis holotype

Scientific classification
- Kingdom: Animalia
- Phylum: Chordata
- Class: Mammalia
- Order: †Hyaenodonta
- Family: †Hyainailouridae
- Subfamily: †Hyainailourinae
- Genus: †Sekhmetops; Al-Ashqar et al., 2025

Type species
- †Sekhmetops africanus (Andrews, 1903)

Other species
- †S. phiomensis (Osborn, 1909)

Synonyms
- S. africanus: Pterodon africanus (Andrews, 1903); S. phiomensis: Pterodon phiomensis (Osborn, 1909)

= Sekhmetops =

Sekhmetops Temporal range: Early Oligocene (Rupelian), ~33.8 Ma

Extinct genus of hyaenodont mammals

Sekhmetops (meaning "Sekhmet face") is an extinct genus of carnivorous hyaenodont mammals from the Early Oligocene Jebel Qatrani Formation of Egypt. The genus contains two species, S. africanus and S. phiomensis, both of which were originally assigned to the genus Pterodon.

== Discovery and naming ==
In 1903, British paleontologist Charles W. Andrews participated in an expedition to Fayûm, Egypt, during which several new vertebrate fossils were collected. Later that year, he published a brief note describing these specimens. He classified one of these, a partial right jaw bone (specimen NHMUK M8503), as a new species of the genus Pterodon, noting how its large size distinguished it from the type species of this genus. The specific name, africanus, is a Latin adjective meaning "from Africa". In a 1906 book, Andrews described and figured the specimen in more depth. He also provisionally referred a left humerus and right femur to this species.

In 1909, American paleontologist Henry Fairfield Osborn described another species of Pterodon, P. phiomensis, based on the holotype (AMNH 13253), a nearly complete left lower jaw. He also referred a second comparable lower jaw, AMNH 13254. Osborn described this species as about two-thirds the size of P. africanus, with a more slender jaw morphology. The specific name, phiomensis, is derived from the phiom—the Greek word for Fayûm, meaning "lake"—referencing the type locality.

In 2025, Al-Ashqar et al. revised the record of African species assigned to Pterodon, a historic wastebasket taxon. As in previous analyses, they observed that the species referred to this genus form a polyphyletic assemblage. As such, they established a new genus, Sekhmetops, for "P." africanus and "P." phiomensis. The generic name combines a reference to Sekhmet—a lion-headed goddess from Ancient Egyptian mythology associated with pestilence and war—with the Greek suffix "-ops", meaning "face". The authors' intended translation is "having the face of the lion-headed goddess".

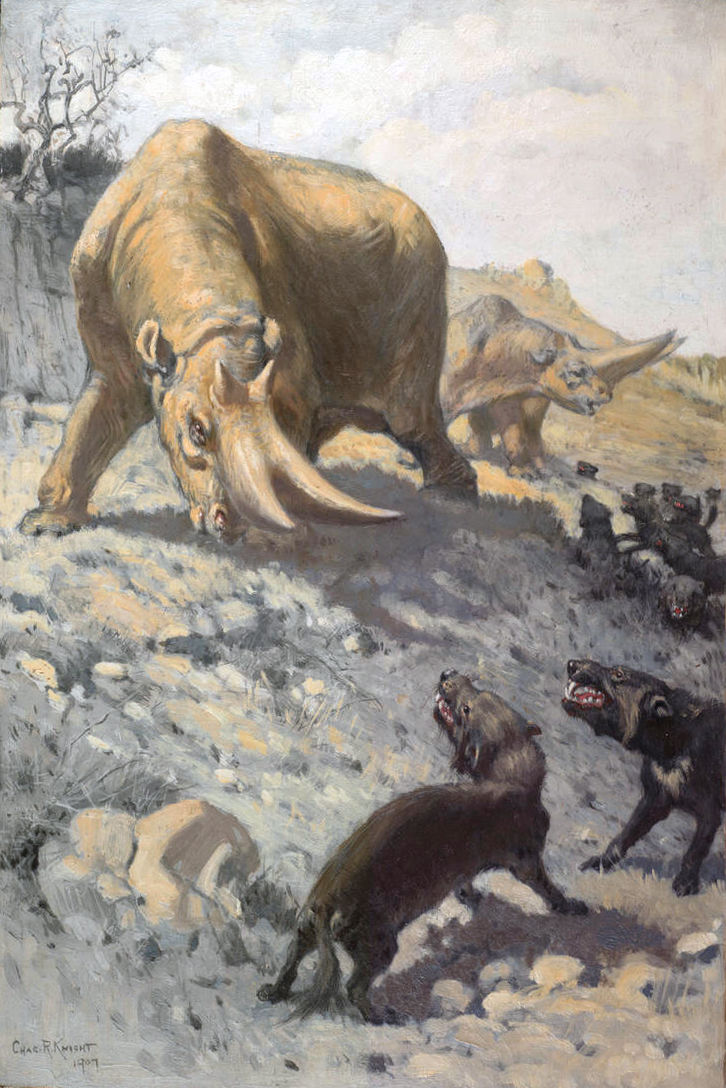
Historical life restoration by Charles R. Knight (1907) of two Sekhmetops (bottom) and Arsinoitherium

== Description ==
Sekhmetops is a medium-sized hyaenodont, around the size of a lion. In their 2019 description of Simbakubwa, Borths and colleagues estimated the body mass of S. phiomensis (then referred to "P." phiomensis) at approximately 158–200 kg (348–441 lb).

== Classification ==
Using an expanded matrix from previous phylogenetic analyses, Al-Ashqar et al. recovered "P." africanus and "P." phiomensis as sister taxa within the hyaenodontan subfamily Hyainailourinae. Their results are displayed in the cladogram below:

- Hyainailourinae
  - Orienspterodon dahkoensis
  - - - Kerberos langebadreae
      - Pterodon dasyuroides
    - - - Hemipsalodon
        - - Akhnatenavus leptognathus
          - Akhnatenavus nefertiticyon
      - - - Sekhmetops africanus
          - Sekhmetops phiomensis
        - - Paroxyaena sp.
          - - Thereutherium
            - - - Sectisodon markgrafi
                - - - Namasector soriae
                    - Prionogale breviceps
                  - - - Leakitherium hiwegi
                      - Mlanyama sugu
                    - - - Exiguodon pilgrimi
                        - Metapterodon kaiseri
                      - - Ekweeconfractus amorui
                        - Isohyaenodon zadoki
              - - - Bastetodon syrtos
                  - Falcatodon schlosseri
                - - - Hyainailouros sulzeri
                    - Megistotherium
                  - - Simbakubwa
                    - - Hyainailouros napakensis
                      - - Hyainailouros nyanzae
                        - - Isohyaenodon andrewsi
                          - - Hyainailouros bugtiensis
                            - Sivapterodon lahirii
