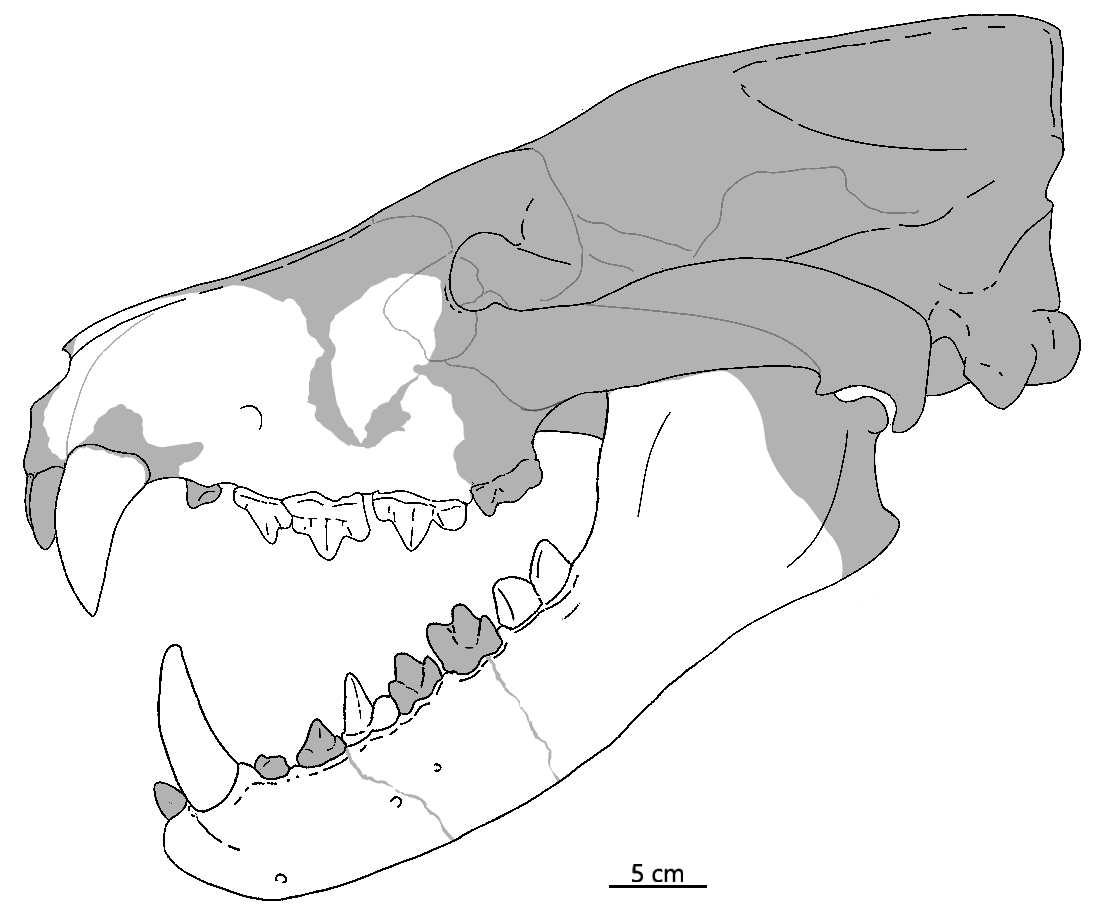
- Reconstructed skull of Simbakubwa kutokaafrika

Scientific classification
- Kingdom: Animalia
- Phylum: Chordata
- Class: Mammalia
- Infraclass: Placentalia
- Order: †Hyaenodonta
- Superfamily: †Hyainailouroidea
- Family: †Hyainailouridae
- Subfamily: †Hyainailourinae
- Genus: †Simbakubwa; Borths & Stevens, 2019

Type species
- †Simbakubwa kutokaafrika Borths & Stevens, 2019

= Simbakubwa =

Simbakubwa Temporal range: Early Miocene (Aquitanian) 23.0–22.0 Ma

Extinct genus of mammals

Simbakubwa ("great lion" in Swahili) is an extinct genus of hyaenodonts belonging to the family Hyainailouridae that lived in Kenya during the Early Miocene. It was discovered between 1978 and 1981 near Meswa Bridge in western Kenya, and its remains, consisting of a lower jaw, part of the snout, and some of the smaller limb bones, were originally believed to come from hyena. After re-examination by Matthew Borths and Nancy Stevens, it was named and assigned to the hyaenodont lineage in 2019. One species of Simbakubwa, S. kutokaafrika, has been described.

Body mass estimates for Simbakuba vary considerably based on which method is used, with the smallest being about 280 kg (620 lb), and the largest being 1,308 and 1,554 kg (2,884 and 3,426 lb), which would surpass modern polar bears. Based on body mass alone it is the second-largest known hyainailourid, behind Megistotherium. Due to the fact that the type skull has been heavily restored, not much is known about its shape. As with other hyaenodonts, Simbakubwa's molars bore so-called carnassial blades. These would have sharpened as the animal opened and closed its jaw, forming a perpetual cutting edge. Though little is known of the hindlimb anatomy of Simbakubwa, it appears to have had a semi-digitigrade gait, in which the heel was held off the ground, though not as strongly as in true digitigrades. A similar gait is seen in Hyainailouros, whereas Kerberos is an example of the ancestral plantigrade (with the heel planted on the ground) condition. A semi-digitigrade or digitigrade stance is an efficient means of conserving energy and is often associated with an open environment.

The enormous body size of Simbakubwa may be the result of its lineage evolving to specialise in large prey, such as proboscideans (elephants and their relatives) and rhinoceroses. Its extinction, along with that of other giant hyainailourines, may have been a consequence of this specialisation, as large herbivores tend to breed slowly and even a temporary population decrease would significantly impact a hyainailourine's prey base. It has also been argued that social carnivorans outcompeted giant hyainailourines due to their larger, more complex brains. However, studies have found little to no evidence of brain size correlating to sociality among carnivorans.

== Taxonomy ==
=== Early history ===
The first fossils of Simbakubwa, consisting of a mandible (lower jaw), a right upper maxilla (one of the bones of the upper jaw), a calcaneus, and two unguals (bones that would have supported claws), were discovered by palaeontologists searching for the remains of early apes at the Meswa Bridge site in western Kenya, between 1978 and 1981. They were stored at the Nairobi National Museum in Kenya, where they were initially labelled as belonging to hyenas. In 2013, Matthew Borths, a palaeontologist working on a dissertation on hyaenodonts, became aware of the specimens, and immediately recognised them as belonging to a member of that clade. In 2019, Borths, alongside Nancy Stevens, published a paper in which they described a new species based on these remains, which they gave the binomial name Simbakubwa kutokaafrika. The generic name, Simbakubwa, comes from the Swahili language simba ("lion"), and kubwa ("big"); the specific name kutokaafrika comes from the Swahili for "from Africa". An additional specimen, consisting of a third molar from the Nakwai locality in northern Kenya, was assigned to Simbakubwa in 2020.

=== Taxonomy ===
Simbakubwa belongs to the hyaenodont family Hyainailouridae, and occupies a derived position in the subfamily, Hyainailourinae. In their 2019 paper describing it, Borths and Stevens conducted a phylogenetic analysis which recovered Simbakubwa as the sister taxon to a clade which includes a paraphyletic Hyainailouros, Isohyaenodon, Sivapterodon, and an unnamed taxon listed as the Arrisdrift hyainailourine.

The cladogram below is based on the results recovered by Borths and Stevens:

- Hyainailourinae
  - - Falcatodon schlosseri
    - - Simbakubwa kutokaafrika
      - - - Hyainailouros sulzeri
          - Arrisdrift hyainailourine
        - - Hyainailouros napakensis
          - - Isohyaenodon andrewsi
            - - Sivapterodon
              - Hyainailouros bugtiensis
  - - - Megistotherium osteothlastes
      - Leakitherium hiwegi
    - - - Mlanyama sugu
        - Megapterodon kaiseri
      - - Isohyaenodon zadoki
        - Exiguodon pilgrimi

== Description ==
=== Size ===
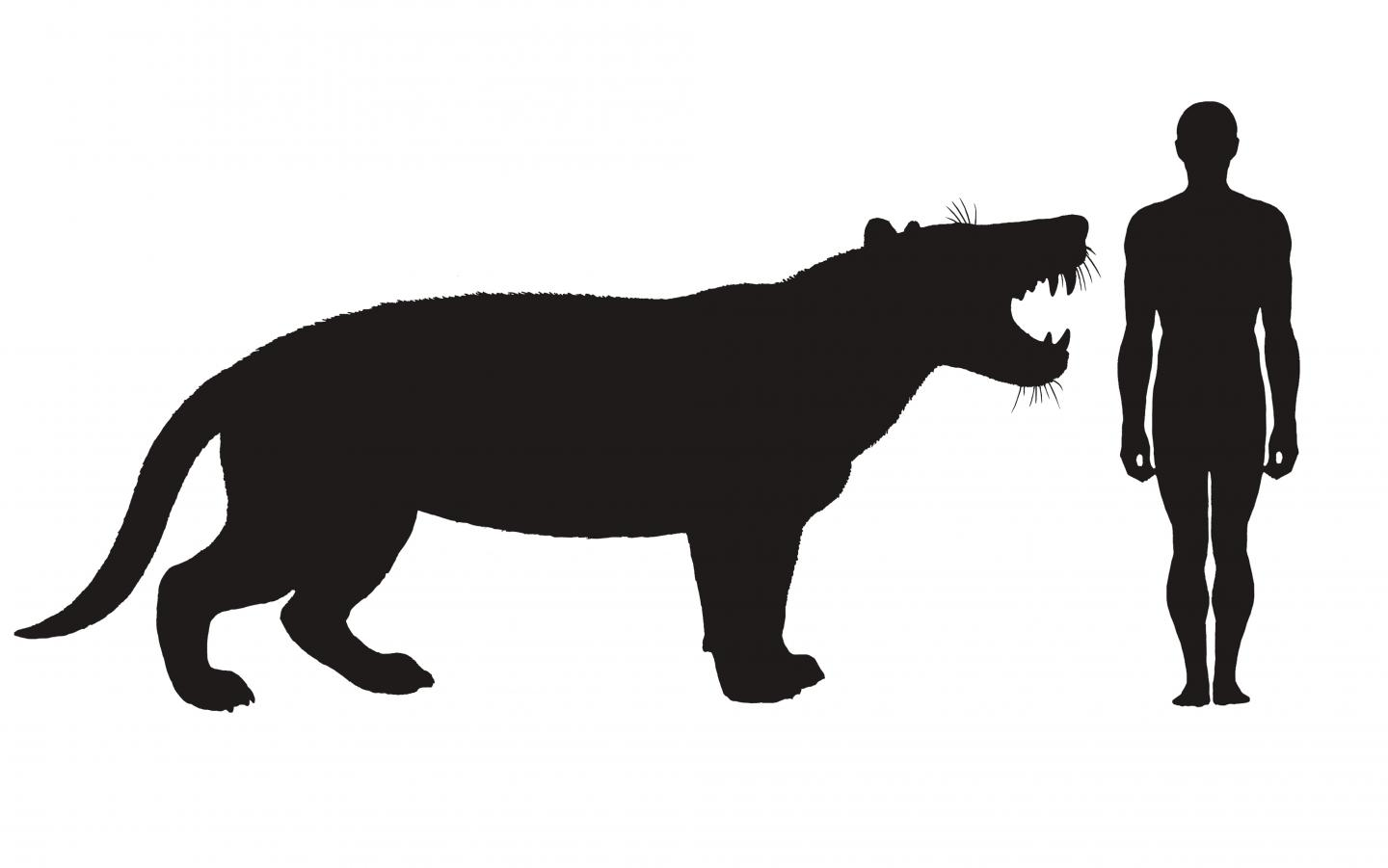
Size comparison between S. kutokaafrika and a human

Different regression models produce a wide range of body mass estimates for Simbakubwa kutokaafrika. All of the ones implemented used the length of the third lower molar, though used different formulas for the corresponding body size calculations. The lowest estimate, was 280 kg (620 lb), based on an equation derived from the length of the third lower premolar in various mid-sized and large carnivorans; this would be comparable to the largest lions. The higher estimates, based on comparisons between the third molar lengths in hyaenodonts and felids, were 1,308 and 1,554 kg (2,884 and 3,426 lb), which would surpass the modern polar bear in size. Hyainailourids possessed very large heads in proportion to their body size, and postcranial remains indicate that the similar sized Hyainailouros was about the size of a tiger, whereas the larger Megistotherium has been estimated to have reached a maximum weight of 500 kilograms (1,100 lb). The Simbakubwa study, however, estimated the body mass of Megistotherium as having a lower estimate of 317 kg (699 lb), and higher estimates of 1,794–3,002 kg (3,955–6,618 lb). Whichever estimate is adopted, S. kutokaafrica eclipses every Palaeogene hyaenodont in body size. Hyaenodonts did increase in size over the course of their evolution, though later taxa such as Simbakubwa took this to its greatest extent.

=== Skull and dentition ===
The skull of Simbakubwa is known from a partial maxilla and a left mandible. Much of what is known has been at least partly restored, making certain aspects of its morphology difficult to discern. Due to the relative incompleteness of Simbakubwa's mandible, and the fact that the distal (front, away from the midline) portion is reconstructed, it is not certain how long the mandibular symphysis was. The coronoid process appears to begin distally to the third molar, to be low and rounded, and to slightly recurve along the posterior (rear) edge, although the restoration of the fossil makes it difficult to determine whether this is actually the case. The masseteric fossa of the mandible to which the masseter muscle would have attached is bordered anteriorly (towards the front) by a thick coronoid ridge, and inferiorly (at the bottom) by a poorly defined ridge. The insertion points for the pterygoid muscles are well-defined.

The left mandible known from Simbakubwa preserves three teeth: a canine, the fourth lower premolar, and the third lower molar. The lower canines were strongly compressed laterally (from side-to-side), more so than in Hemipsalodon, Kerberos, Orienspterodon, and Pterodon. The fourth premolar of Simbakubwa was relatively short, was more laterally compressed than that of Hyainailouros, and its talonid region bore a single laterally compressed cusp. All of Simbakubwa's molars had protocones which projected lingually (the inner side, towards the tongue), rather than mesially (towards the midline of the skull). The metastyles of the first and second upper molars were fairly gracile. The second upper molar bore multiple cusps on its parastyle. Unlike in Megistotherium, the trigonids of the fourth lower premolar and the third lower molar were strongly laterally compressed relative to their mesiodistal length. The molar protocones project lingually (inwards), rather than mesially (upwards). The parastyle of the second molar has multiple cusps, unlike in Hyainailouros. As with other large hyainailourids, Simbakubwa's molars bear so-called carnassial notches. The carnassial blades were rotated lingually, and would have been sharpened whenever it closed its jaw, thus ensuring a perpetual shearing edge.

=== Postcranial skeleton ===
Little is known of Simbakubwa's postcranial skeleton, besides a calcaneum and two ungual phalanges, the bones which would have sported claws in life. Based on what is known, Simbakubwa likely walked with a semi-digitigrade posture, walking primarily but not entirely on its digits. A digitigrade stance conserves energy and often correlates to an open habitat, and the stance of Simbakubwa, shared with Hyainailouros, would have been more efficient than the plantigrade stance of the related Kerberos.

== Palaeobiology ==
In their paper describing Simbakubwa, Borths and Stevens suggested a correlation between large body size in hyainailourines and an increase in prey size. With the habitat changes brought on by the onset of the Miocene, there was an increase in the number of large herbivore taxa. Carnivorous mammals with a body mass above 25 kg (55 lb) frequently hunt prey with a mass equal to or greater than their own, and giant hyainailourines such as Simbakubwa were close in size to some of the anthracotheres, rhinocerotids and proboscideans which they shared their environment with. As such, the evolution of a large body size in hyainailurine (which appears to have evolved repeatedly, as both Simbakubwa and Megistotherium's closest relatives are far smaller) may correlate with the hunting and scavenging of large megafaunal herbivores. Robert J. G. Savage noted that Megistotherium had a large enough gape to engulf the limbs of certain proboscideans. Borths and Stevens (2019) hypothesized has been argued its specialization towards megafaunal prey was due to the changes of the herbivores within Afro-Arabian environments. However, the specialization on large mammalian prey made large hyainailourines vulnerable to changing environments, as even a brief population decline would've had larger impact on large hyainailourines than the smaller contemporary carnivorans.

Borths and Stevens (2019) argued that carnivorans outcompeted giant hyainailourines due to the former supposedly being social thanks to larger, more complex brains. However, studies have found little to no evidence of sociality being correlated with the brain sizes of carnivorans. Early Miocene Africa was noted to have closed forested ecosystems, which were unfavorable environments habitat for cooperative hunting.
