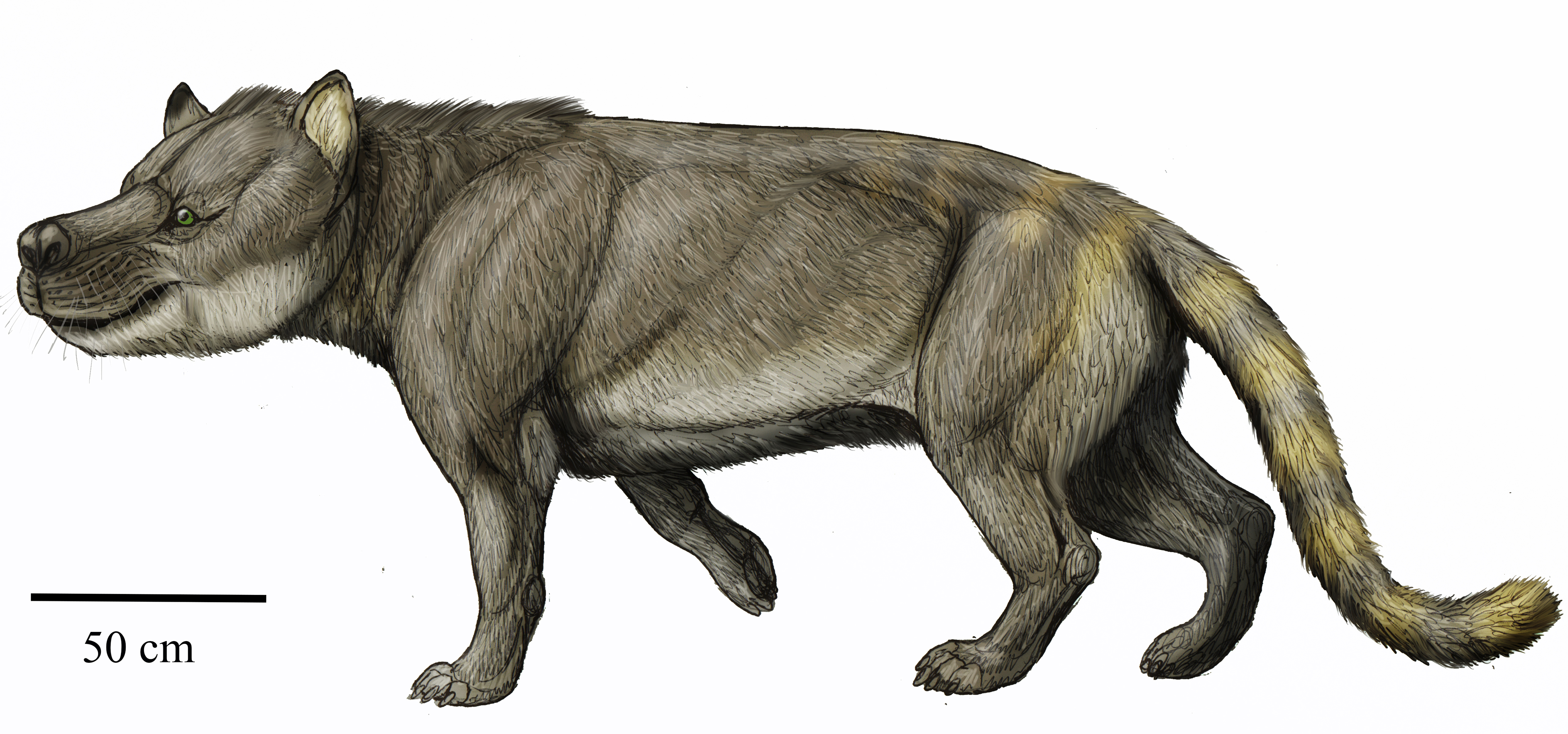
- Megistotherium osteothlastes life restoration
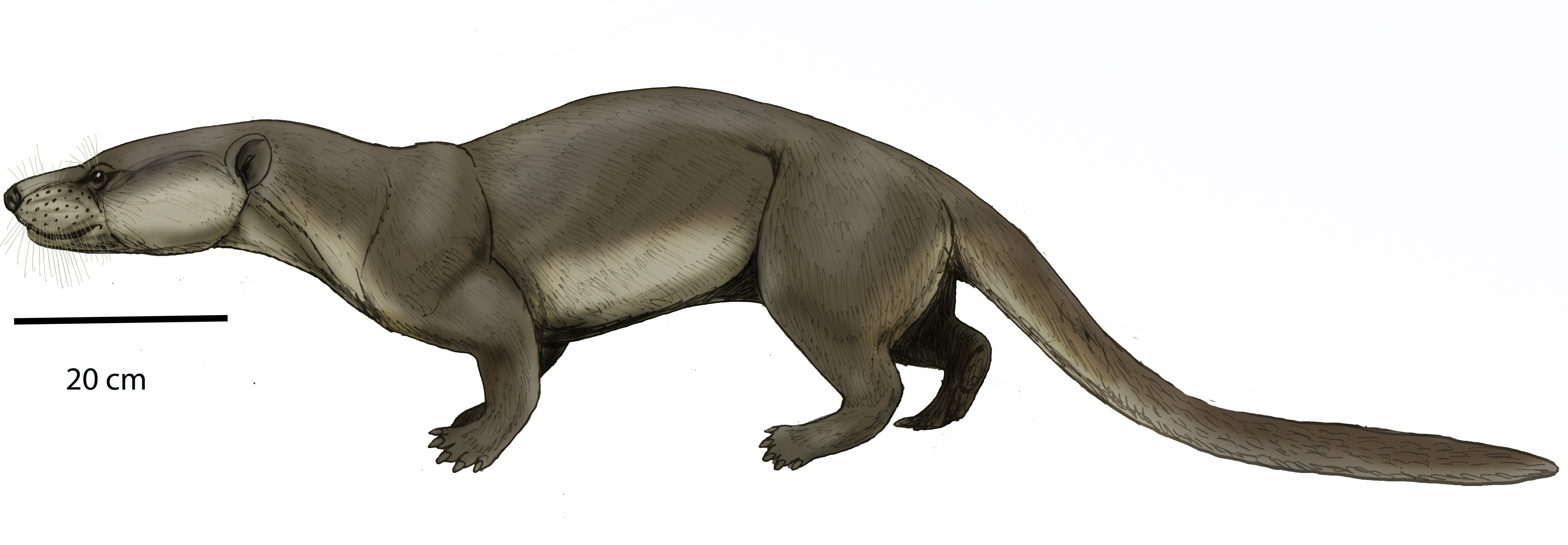
- Apterodon macrognathus life restoration

Scientific classification
- Kingdom: Animalia
- Phylum: Chordata
- Class: Mammalia
- Order: †Hyaenodonta
- Superfamily: †Hyainailouroidea
- Family: †Hyainailouridae; Pilgrim, 1932

Type genus
- †Hyainailouros^{(paraphyletic genus)} Biedermann, 1863

Subfamilies
- [see classification]

Synonyms
- list of synonyms: Hyaenaelurinae (Pilgrim, 1932); Hyainailourindae (Solé, 2015); Pterodontidae (Polly, 1996); Pterodontinae (Polly, 1996)

= Hyainailouridae =

Hyainailouridae Temporal range: Middle Eocene to Late Miocene 47.8–9.8 Ma Suspected Early Eocene origin

Extinct family of mammals

Hyainailouridae ("hyena-like cats") is a family of extinct predatory mammals within the superfamily Hyainailouroidea within extinct order Hyaenodonta. Fossil records show hyainailourids arose during the Middle Eocene, although Early Eocene origin is suspected, the family persisted into the Late Miocene. Fossils of this group have been found in Eurasia, Africa, and North America. Originally considered a subfamily of Hyaenodontidae, the group included small species as well as massive predators like Megistotherium. While many were hypercarnivores, others were mesocarnivorous or showed adaptations towards osteophagy.

== Classification and phylogeny ==
=== Relations ===
Hyainailouridae used to be considered a subfamily of Hyaenodontidae, but cladistic study by Sole et al., (2013, 2015) treats it as a distinct family. Two subfamilies are recognized, Apterodontinae and Hyainailourinae.

=== Taxonomy ===
- Family: †Hyainailouridae (Pilgrim, 1932)
  - Subfamily: †Apterodontinae (Szalay, 1967)
    - Genus: †Apterodon (Fischer, 1880)
      - †Apterodon altidens (Schlosser, 1910)
      - †Apterodon gaudryi (Fischer, 1880)
      - †Apterodon langebadreae (Grohé, 2012)
      - †Apterodon macrognathus (Andrews, 1904)
      - †Apterodon rauenbergensis (Frey, 2010)
      - †Apterodon saghensis (Simons & Gingerich, 1976)
      - †Apterodon sp. [Dur At-Talah escarpment, Libya] (Grohé, 2012)
    - Genus: †Quasiapterodon (Lavrov, 1999)
      - †Quasiapterodon minutus (Schlosser, 1910)
  - Subfamily: †Hyainailourinae (Pilgrim, 1932)
    - Genus: †Ekweeconfractus (Savage, 1973)
      - †Ekweeconfractus amorui (Flink, 2021)
    - Genus: †Leakitherium (Savage, 1965)
      - †Leakitherium hiwegi (Savage, 1965)
    - Genus: †Megistotherium (Savage, 1973)
      - †Megistotherium osteothlastes (Savage, 1973)
    - Genus: †Mlanyama (Rasmussen & Gutierrez, 2009)
      - †Mlanyama sugu (Rasmussen & Gutierrez, 2009)
    - Genus: †Pakakali (Borths & Stevens, 2017)
      - †Pakakali rukwaensis (Borths & Stevens, 2017)
    - Genus: †Simbakubwa (Borths & Stevens, 2019)
      - †Simbakubwa kutokaafrika (Borths & Stevens, 2019)
    - Genus: †Thereutherium (Filhol, 1876)
      - †Thereutherium thylacodes (Filhol, 1876)
    - (unranked): †Akhnatenavus clade
      - Genus: †Akhnatenavus (Holroyd, 1999)
        - †Akhnatenavus leptognathus (Osborn, 1909)
        - †Akhnatenavus nefertiticyon (Borths, 2016)
      - Genus: †Hemipsalodon (Cope, 1885)
        - †Hemipsalodon grandis (Cope, 1885)
        - †Hemipsalodon viejaensis (Gustafson, 1986)
      - Genus: †Ischnognathus (Stovall, 1948)
        - †Ischnognathus savagei (Stovall, 1948)
    - (unranked): †Maocyon/Orienspterodon clade
      - Genus: †Maocyon (Averianov, 2023)
        - †Maocyon peregrinus (Averianov, 2023)
      - Genus: †Orienspterodon (Egi, 2007)
        - †Orienspterodon dahkoensis (Chow, 1975)
        - †Orienspterodon mianchiensis (Sheng, Bi & Li, 2024)
    - Tribe: †Hyainailourini ^{(polyphyletic tribe)} (Ginsburg, 1980)
      - Genus: †Bastetodon (Al-Ashqar, 2025)
        - †Bastetodon syrtos (Holroyd, 1999)
      - Genus: †Exiguodon (Morales & Pickford, 2017)
        - †Exiguodon pilgrimi (Savage, 1965)
      - Genus: †Falcatodon (Morales & Pickford, 2017)
        - †Falcatodon schlosseri (Holroyd, 1999)
      - Genus: †Hyainailouros ^{(paraphyletic genus)} (Biedermann, 1863)
        - †Hyainailouros bugtiensis (Pilgrim, 1912)
        - †Hyainailouros napakensis (Ginsburg, 1980)
        - †Hyainailouros sulzeri (Biedermann, 1863)
      - Genus: †Isohyaenodon ^{(polyphyletic genus)} (Savage, 1965)
        - †Isohyaenodon andrewsi (Savage, 1965)
        - †Isohyaenodon zadoki (Savage, 1965)
      - Genus: †Parapterodon (Lange-Badré, 1979)
        - †Parapterodon lostangensis (Lange-Badré, 1979)
      - Genus: †Sectisodon (Morales & Pickford, 2017)
        - †Sectisodon markgrafi (Holroyd, 1999)
        - †Sectisodon occultus (Morales & Pickford, 2017)
      - Genus: †Sekhmetops (Al-Ashqar, 2025)
        - †Sekhmetops africanus (Andrews, 1903)
        - †Sekhmetops phiomensis (Osborn, 1909)
      - Genus: †Sivapterodon (Ginsburg, 1980)
        - †Sivapterodon lahirii (Pilgrim, 1932)
      - (unranked): †Pterodon clade
        - Genus: †Kerberos (Solé, 2015)
          - †Kerberos langebadreae (Solé, 2015)
        - Genus: †Pterodon (Blainville, 1839)
          - †Pterodon dasyuroides (Blainville, 1839)
      - Incertae sedis:
        - †"Pterodon" sp. [DPC 5036] (Holroyd, 1999)
    - Tribe: †Metapterodontini (Morales & Pickford, 2017)
      - Genus: †Metapterodon (Stromer, 1926)
        - †Metapterodon anari (Mahmood, 2026)
        - †Metapterodon brachycephalus (Osborn, 1909)
        - †Metapterodon kaiseri (Stromer, 1926)
        - †Metapterodon stromeri (Morales, 1998)
    - Tribe: †Paroxyaenini (Lavrov, 2007)
      - Genus: †Paroxyaena (Martin, 1906)
        - †Paroxyaena galliae (Filhol, 1881)
        - †Paroxyaena pavlovi (Lavrov, 2007)
    - Incertae sedis:
      - †"Pterodon" sp. [BC 15'08] (Pickford, 2008)
      - †Hyainailourinae sp. [GSN AD 100'96] (Morales, 1998)
      - †Hyainailourinae sp. [UON 84-359] (Solé, 2016)
      - †Hyainailourinae sp. A [DPC 6555] (Holroyd, 1999)
      - †Hyainailourinae sp. C [DPC 9243 & DPC 10315] (Holroyd, 1999)
      - †Hyainailourinae sp. D [DPC 6545] (Holroyd, 1999)
  - Subfamily: †Koholiinae (Crochet, 1988)
    - Genus: †Koholia (Crochet, 1988)
      - †Koholia atlasense (Crochet, 1988)

== Characteristics ==
The largest known hyainailourid, as well as the largest hyaenodont, was Megistotherium. This taxa was estimated to have weighed 500–880 kg (1,100–1,940 lb), while 1,794–3,002 kg (3,955–6,618 lb) has been proposed, it exceeds the biomechanical limit of 1,100 kg (2,400 lb) for terrestrial mammalian carnivores, making the estimate unreliable. Hyainailouros was another large hyainailourid, with the largest species, Hyainailouros sulzeri, stood 100 cm (3 ft 3 in) at the shoulders and weighed 500 kg (1,100 lb). However, other members such as Pakakali, Mlanyama, and Isohyaenodon, were smaller within the 5–15 kg (11–33 lb) range, equivalent to a bobcat or fossa.

=== Locomotion ===
Early hyainailourids, such as Kerberos and Apterodontinae, had plantigrade locomotion, with feet flat on the ground, similar to bears. However, this trait was later lost as later hyainailourids, such as Simbakubwa, had semi-digitigrade locomotion which was more energy efficient in open environments. Unlike Hyaenodon, Hyainailouros wasn’t a cursorial predator but it was a capable jumper.

At least one hyainailourid lineage, apterodontines, was semi-aquatic and was fossorial.

=== Diet ===
Many hyainailourids, especially Miocene hyainailourids; were hypercarnivores. However, there were some hyainailourids that were mesocarnivorous such as Pakakali. Apterodon was believed to have fed on hard-shelled animals such as crustaceans. While Pakakli was found to eaten small vertebrates, occupying a niche similar to modern day gray foxes. Some hyainailourids, such as Kerberos, Megistotherium and Hyainailouros, showed adaptations towards osteophagy.

The larger hyainailourines were more specialized into taking down larger prey due to their large size and their relatively long face compared to carnivorans and hyaenodontids. The large size of Hemipsalodon enabled it to hunt brontotheres such as Megacerops. Kerberos was believed to have hunted large herbivores such as Choeropotamus, Lophiodon, and Palaeotherium. The largest hyainailourines, Hyainailouros, Megistotherium, and Simbakubwa were all believed to have been specialized on megaherbivores such as rhinoceroses and proboscideans.

=== Brain anatomy ===
The endocast of Megistotherium was found to have the largest relative neocortex of any of the hyaenodonts. Due to the earliest members having the smallest relative neocortexes, it is thought that throughout their evolution, the neocortex expanded in size. Despite the derived nature of its endocast, a 2019 study found that Megistotherium still had a relatively low EQ score of 0.24-0.29, which is lower than Apterodon, who had an EQ score of 0.34-0.35. However, a 2022 study estimated an even higher EQ score for Megistotherium with a range of 0.49-0.61. However despite this, both studies have found that hyainailourids had lower EQ score than hyaenodontids.

== Evolution ==
Hyainailouridae were one of the two families of the superfamily, Hyainailouroidae, which appeared during the early Paleocene. It is hypothesized that hyainailourides evolved during the early Eocene in Afro-Arabia. However, the earliest known hyainailourid was Orienspterodon from the middle Eocene of China. Fossil evidence suggests the family migrated out of Africa at least four times. The Lutetian/Bartonian Dispersal Phase was the first migration of hyainailourids to Laurasia. The appearance of Kerberos and Paroxyaena was related to a faunal modification of mammals. They may have diapered into Europe via the Iberian Peninsula.

== Extinction ==
During the late Eocene to early Oligocene, hyainailourids went extinct in North America and Europe. Despite regrowth of diversity, hyainailourids would enter a permanent in the Miocene, with the last genus Metapterodon going extinct around 10.1 Ma. The cause of their decline and extinction has been debated by experts. Many experts argued that hyaenodonts were outcompeted by carnivorans. Lang and colleagues argued that carnivorans may have played a role in the extinction of hyaenodonts with the adaptive potential of their carnassials and the difference in functional morphology. Some experts argued that carnivorans may have forced hyainailourids to become more hypercarnivorous as even the smallest Miocene hyainailourids showed extreme signs of hypercarnivory compared to older hyainailourid taxa.

Borths and Stevens, in their 2019 paper, argued that the giant hyainailourines were outcompeted by social carnivorans due to their larger, more complex brains. But other experts have questioned if carnivorans played a role in their decline and extinction. The discovery of Simbakuwba suggests the evolution of large hyainailourines was due to changes in the herbivore fauna instead of competition with carnivorans. However, studies have found no correlation of brain size to sociality among carnivorans, with the relative size of the anterior brain playing a bigger role in correlation to sociality.

Christison and colleagues analyzed hyaenodonts and carnivorans from Calf Creek locality of Cypress Hills Formation. Their analysis found that the largest hyaenodont and carnivore, Hemipsalodon grandis and Hoplophoenus, had very distinct niches, with the former focusing on large herbivores such as brontotheres. They argue this would suggest that competitive replacement wasn’t the driving factor the decline and extinction of North American hyaenodonts. Instead, global climatic cooling during the earliest Oligocene resulted in drier, more open landscapes and which saw the extinction of large browsing herbivores, including brontotheres. Following the extinction of bronotheres, they were replaced by grazing herbivores such as equids and rhinoceroses, which were better suited for the open environments. Because rhinoceroses didn’t reach their large sizes until the Miocene. Hyaenodonts such as Hemipsalodon were at a disadvantage due to the lack of large prey available. In addition, because of their shorter legs, they were likely at a disadvantage in the increasingly open environments.
