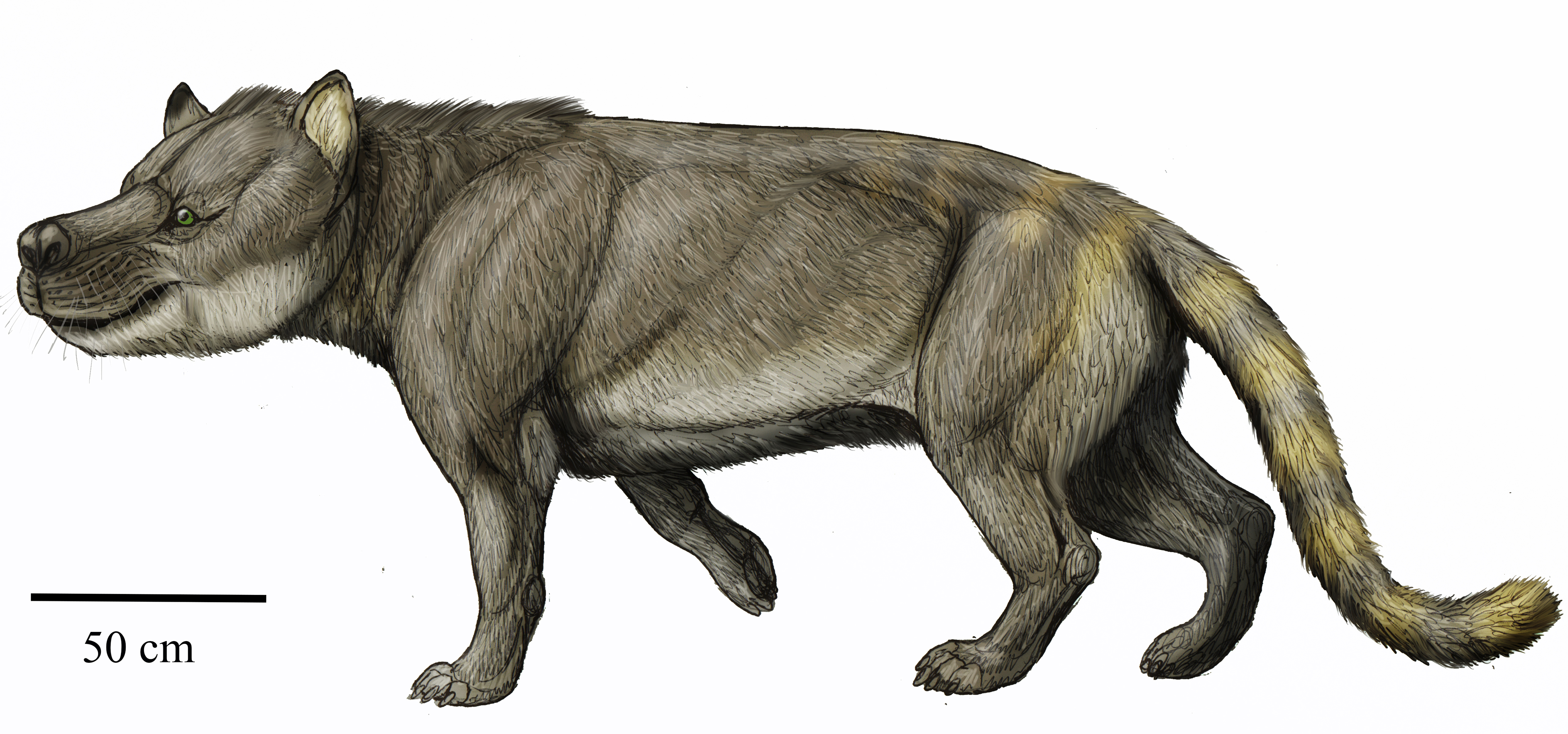
- Megistotherium osteothlastes life restoration
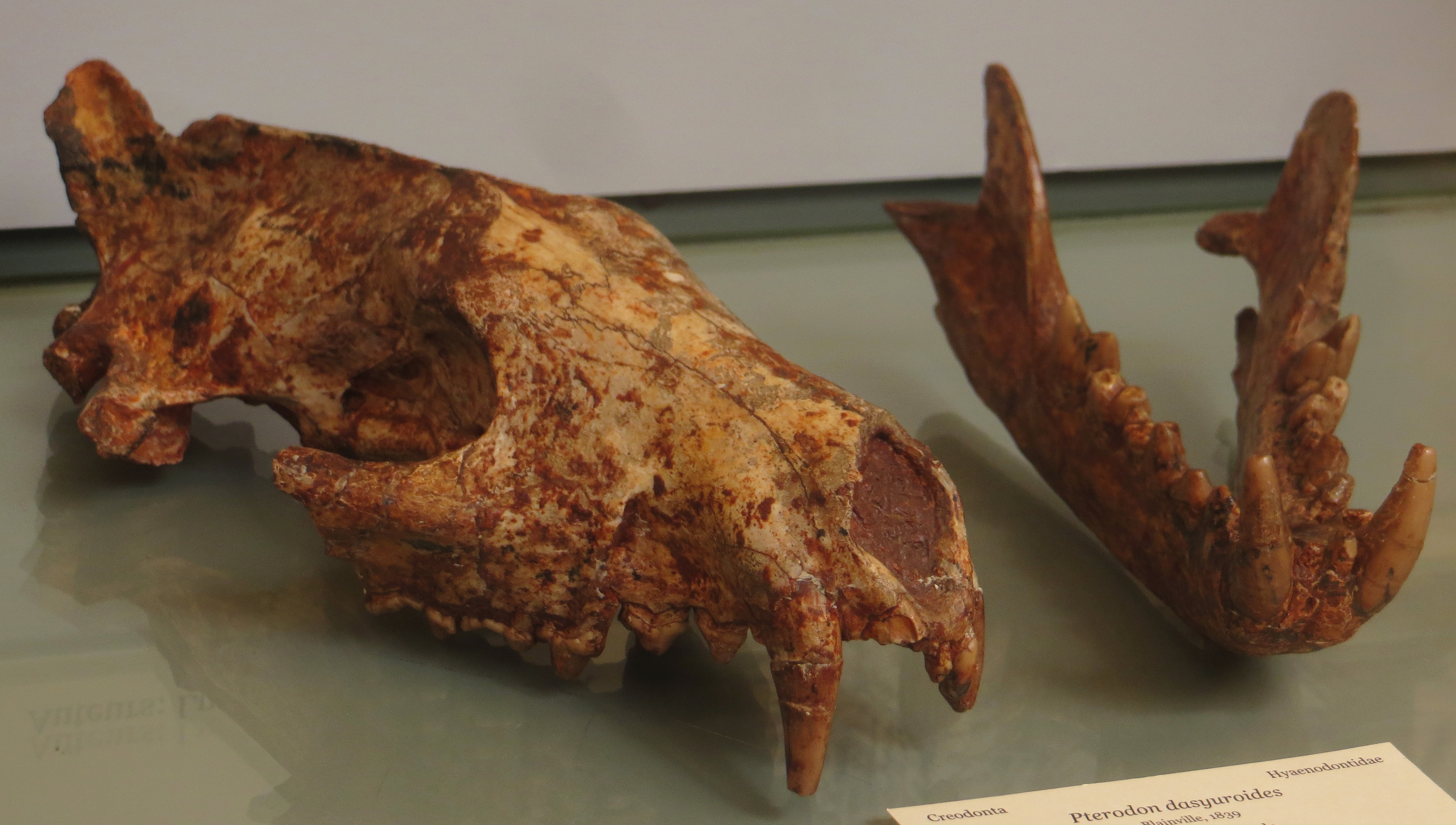
- Pterodon dasyuroides cranium and mandible

Scientific classification
- Kingdom: Animalia
- Phylum: Chordata
- Class: Mammalia
- Order: †Hyaenodonta
- Superfamily: †Hyainailouroidea
- Family: †Hyainailouridae
- Subfamily: †Hyainailourinae; Pilgrim, 1932

Type genus
- †Hyainailouros^{(paraphyletic genus)} Biedermann, 1863

Genera
- [see classification]

Synonyms
- Hyaenaelurinae (Pilgrim, 1932); Hyaninailourinae (Peigné, 2007); Hyaninailourini (Ginsburg, 1980); Pterodontinae (Polly, 1996)

= Hyainailourinae =

Hyainailourinae Temporal range: Middle Eocene to Late Miocene47.8–9.8 Ma

Extinct subfamily of mammals

Hyainailourinae ("hyena-like cats") is a subfamily of hyaenodonts from extinct family Hyainailouridae. They arose during the Middle Eocene in Asia, and persisted well into the Late Miocene. Fossils of this group have been found in Africa, Eurasia, and North America.

== General characteristics ==
Hyainailourins are characterized by long skulls, slender jaws, slim bodies, and a plantigrade stance. They generally ranged in size from 30 to 140 cm at the shoulder. While some measured as much as 1.4 m high at the shoulder with head-body length up to 3.2 m and weighed up to 500 kg, most were in the 5–15 kg range, equivalent to a mid-sized dog. The anatomy of their skulls show that they had a particularly acute sense of smell, while their teeth were adapted for shearing, rather than crushing.

== Classification and phylogeny ==
=== Taxonomy ===
- Subfamily: †Hyainailourinae (Pilgrim, 1932)
  - Genus: †Ekweeconfractus (Savage, 1973)
    - †Ekweeconfractus amorui (Flink, 2021)
  - Genus: †Leakitherium (Savage, 1965)
    - †Leakitherium hiwegi (Savage, 1965)
  - Genus: †Megistotherium (Savage, 1973)
    - †Megistotherium osteothlastes (Savage, 1973)
  - Genus: †Mlanyama (Rasmussen & Gutierrez, 2009)
    - †Mlanyama sugu (Rasmussen & Gutierrez, 2009)
  - Genus: †Pakakali(Borths & Stevens, 2017)
    - †Pakakali rukwaensis (Borths & Stevens, 2017)
  - Genus: †Simbakubwa (Borths & Stevens, 2019)
    - †Simbakubwa kutokaafrika (Borths & Stevens, 2019)
  - Genus: †Thereutherium (Filhol, 1876)
    - †Thereutherium thylacodes (Filhol, 1876)
  - (unranked): †Akhnatenavus clade
    - Genus: †Akhnatenavus (Holroyd, 1999)
      - †Akhnatenavus leptognathus (Osborn, 1909)
      - †Akhnatenavus nefertiticyon (Borths, 2016)
    - Genus: †Hemipsalodon (Cope, 1885)
      - †Hemipsalodon grandis (Cope, 1885)
      - †Hemipsalodon viejaensis (Gustafson, 1986)
    - Genus: †Ischnognathus (Stovall, 1948)
      - †Ischnognathus savagei (Stovall, 1948)
  - (unranked): †Maocyon/Orienspterodon clade
    - Genus: †Maocyon (Averianov, 2023)
      - †Maocyon peregrinus (Averianov, 2023)
    - Genus: †Orienspterodon (Egi, 2007)
      - †Orienspterodon dahkoensis (Chow, 1975)
      - †Orienspterodon mianchiensis (Sheng, Bi & Li, 2024)
  - Tribe: †Hyainailourini ^{( Polyphyletic tribe)} (Ginsburg, 1980)
    - Genus: †Bastetodon (Al-Ashqar, 2025)
      - †Bastetodon syrtos (Holroyd, 1999)
    - Genus: †Exiguodon (Morales & Pickford, 2017)
      - †Exiguodon pilgrimi (Savage, 1965)
    - Genus: †Falcatodon (Morales & Pickford, 2017)
      - †Falcatodon schlosseri (Holroyd, 1999)
    - Genus: †Hyainailouros ^{(Paraphyletic genus)} (Biedermann, 1863)
      - †Hyainailouros bugtiensis (Pilgrim, 1912)
      - †Hyainailouros napakensis (Ginsburg, 1980)
      - †Hyainailouros sulzeri (Biedermann, 1863)
    - Genus: †Isohyaenodon ^{(polyphyletic genus)} (Savage, 1965)
      - †Isohyaenodon andrewsi (Savage, 1965)
      - †Isohyaenodon zadoki (Savage, 1965)
    - Genus: †Parapterodon (Lange-Badré, 1979)
      - †Parapterodon lostangensis (Lange-Badré, 1979)
    - Genus: †Sectisodon (Morales & Pickford, 2017)
      - †Sectisodon markgrafi (Holroyd, 1999)
      - †Sectisodon occultus (Morales & Pickford, 2017)
    - Genus: †Sekhmetops (Al-Ashqar, 2025)
      - †Sekhmetops africanus (Andrews, 1903)
      - †Sekhmetops phiomensis (Osborn, 1909)
    - Genus: †Sivapterodon (Ginsburg, 1980)
      - †Sivapterodon lahirii (Pilgrim, 1932)
    - (unranked): †Pterodon clade
      - Genus: †Kerberos (Solé, 2015)
        - †Kerberos langebadreae (Solé, 2015)
      - Genus: †Pterodon (Blainville, 1839)
        - †Pterodon dasyuroides (Blainville, 1839)
    - Incertae sedis:
      - †"Pterodon" sp. [DPC 5036] (Holroyd, 1999)
  - Tribe: †Metapterodontini (Morales & Pickford, 2017)
    - Genus: †Metapterodon (Stromer, 1926)
      - †Metapterodon anari (Mahmood, 2026)
      - †Metapterodon brachycephalus (Osborn, 1909)
      - †Metapterodon kaiseri (Stromer, 1926)
      - †Metapterodon stromeri (Morales, 1998)
  - Tribe: †Paroxyaenini (Lavrov, 2007)
    - Genus: †Paroxyaena (Martin, 1906)
      - †Paroxyaena galliae (Filhol, 1881)
      - †Paroxyaena pavlovi (Lavrov, 2007)
  - Incertae sedis:
    - †"Pterodon" sp. [BC 15'08] (Pickford, 2008)
    - †Hyainailourinae sp. [GSN AD 100'96] (Morales, 1998)
    - †Hyainailourinae sp. [UON 84-359] (Solé, 2016)
    - †Hyainailourinae sp. A [DPC 6555] (Holroyd, 1999)
    - †Hyainailourinae sp. C [DPC 9243 & DPC 10315] (Holroyd, 1999)
    - †Hyainailourinae sp. D [DPC 6545] (Holroyd, 1999)
