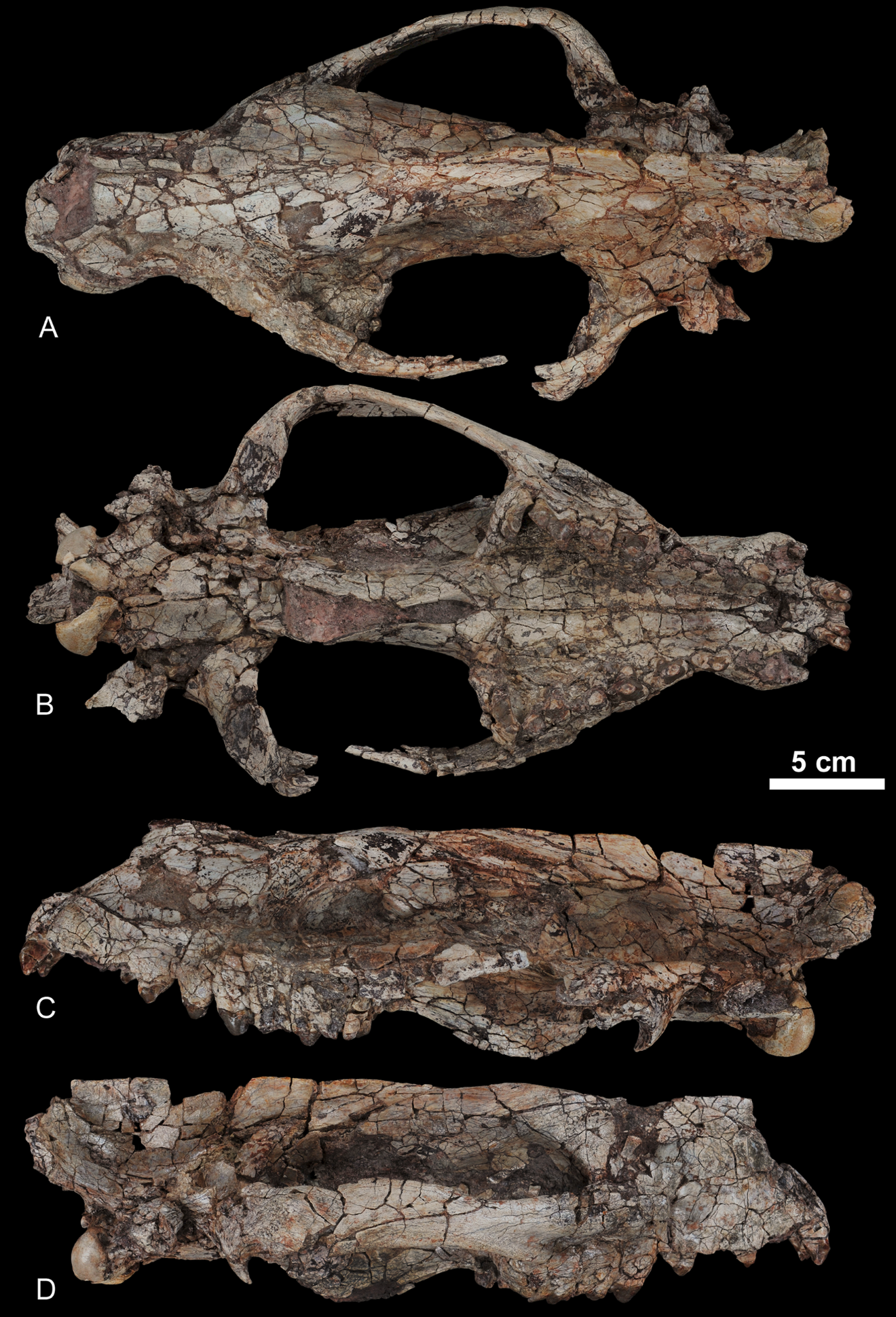
- Skull

Scientific classification
- Kingdom: Animalia
- Phylum: Chordata
- Class: Mammalia
- Order: †Hyaenodonta
- Family: †Hyainailouridae
- Subfamily: †Hyainailourinae
- Tribe: †Hyainailourini
- Genus: †Kerberos; Solé, 2015
- Species: †K. langebadreae

Binomial name
- †Kerberos langebadreae Solé, 2015

= Kerberos langebadreae =

Kerberos langebadreae Temporal range: Middle Eocene (Bartonian) 40.0–37.8 Ma

Extinct animal

Kerberos ("Cerberus", after the multi-headed hellhound which guards the entrance to the Underworld) is an extinct genus of hyainailourid hyaenodonts in the subfamily Hyainailourinae, whose remains are known from France. The type and only known specimen was discovered in 1981 by Dominique Vidalenc, near the city of Lautrec in the Tarn department, in strata from the Sables du Castrais Formation. The specimen, consisting of a well-preserved skull, a lower jaw, and several limb elements, came from Montespieu, a fossil-bearing deposit dating to the Bartonian age of the Eocene; another hyaenodont, Cynohyaenodon, had been previously recovered from the same site. Kerberos was named in 2015 by a team consisting of Vidalenc and colleagues. One species of Kerberos, Kerberos langebadreae, has been described.

Kerberos was fairly large, with a mean estimated weight of 140 kg (310 lb), more than most of the hyaenodonts it shared its environment with. Its skull, when measured from the tip of its snout to the very back, was around 35 cm (14 in) in length, similar in size to that of a female brown bear. It had a fairly short snout and a tall sagittal crest, indicating that it had a powerful bite. Kerberos' premolars were adapted for crushing, while its molars appear to have been better suited for slicing. Certain aspects of its limb anatomy suggest that Kerberos walked with a plantigrade gait, that is to say one where the entire foot, including the heel, contacted the ground (as opposed to a digitigrade gait where only the toes contact the ground). This appears to be a primitive condition among hyainailourids, and many later genera, such as Simbakubwa, shifted to a semi-digitigrade gait.

The feeding ecology of Kerberos is believed to have been similar to that of modern striped and spotted hyenas. It was likely efficient both as an active hunter and as a scavenger, and, like other hyainailourines, wear patterns on its premolars suggest that it was capable of processing bone. It is a general trend that carnivores over about 25 kg (55 lb) often hunt prey with a body mass equal to or larger than themselves, so it is likely that Kerberos fed on some of the larger herbivores it coexisted with, such as Choeropotamus, Lophiodon, and Palaeotherium. It does not appear that Kerberos competed with the other hyaenodonts, namely hyaenodontids and proviverrines, with which it coexisted. Rather, as indicated by the lack of similarly sized mammalian predators, hyainailourines as a whole appear to have lacked direct ecological equivalents in Europe prior to their arrival, and thus occupied niches which were formerly left vacant.

== Taxonomy ==
=== Early history ===
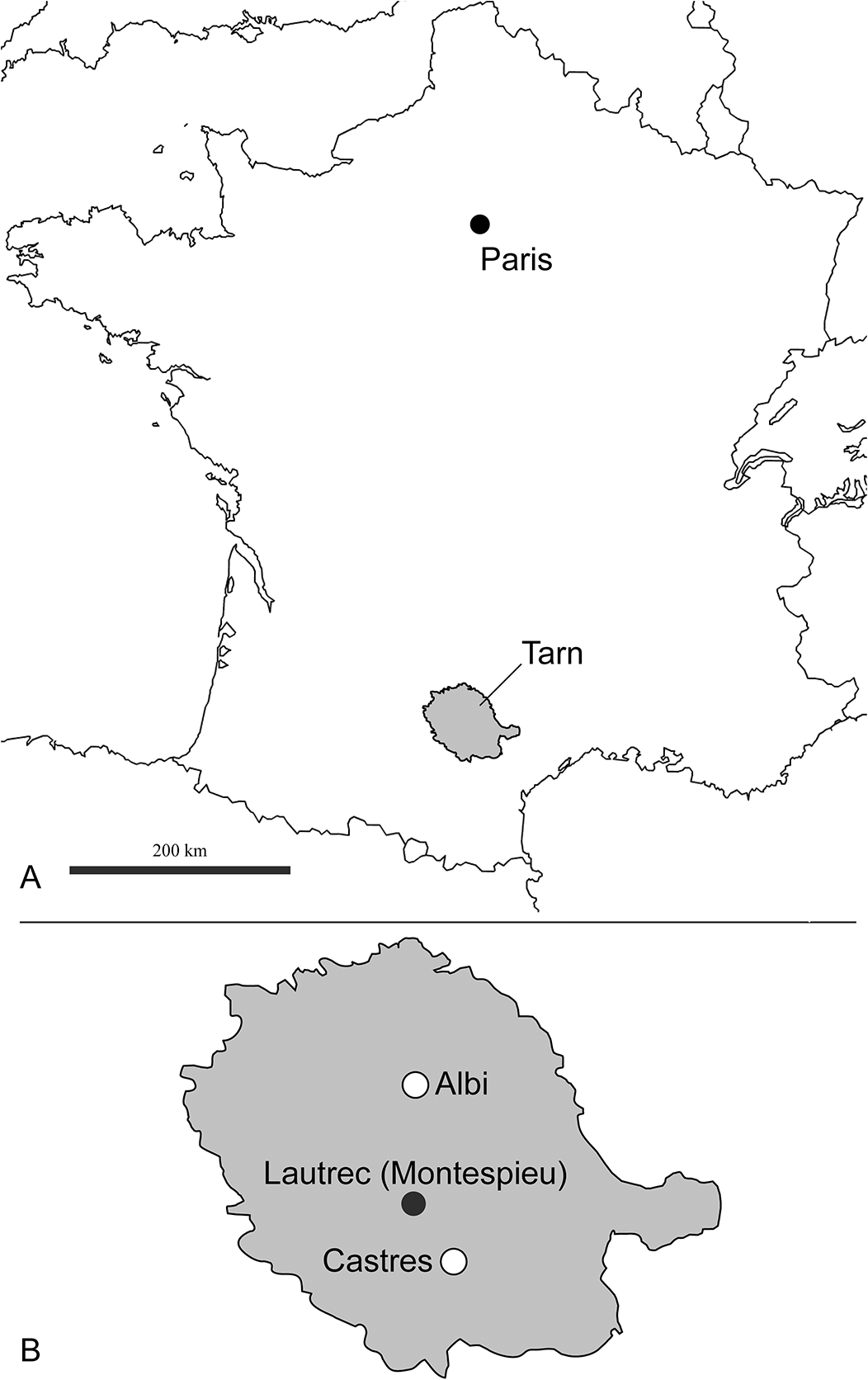
(A) location of the Tarn Department in France; (B) location of the Montespieu site in Tarn

The type specimen of Kerberos langebadreae, consisting of a skull, a mandible (lower jaw), and several associated hindlimb elements, was discovered in 1981, near the city of Lautrec in the Tarn department of southern France, by Dominique Vidalenc. The locality from which it was recovered, Montespieu, is a fossiliferous deposit discovered in the 19th century, part of the Sables du Castrais Formation. It is believed to have dated to the Bartonian age of the Eocene, and as such the new taxon would have been part of the "Castrais" fauna, which was published on by Hans Georg Stehlin. Vidalenc had conducted field work at the site in the 1970s–80s, and had previously recovered the type specimen of Cynohyaenodon lautricensis from the site. The specimen recovered in 1981, which was catalogued as MNHN.F.EBA 517–528, was brought to the Muséum national d'Histoire naturelle (National Museum of Natural History, in Paris, France, where it was prepared by Vidalenc and C. Bouillet.

In 2015, Solé and colleagues made the specimen's skull (catalogued as MNHN.F.EBA 517) the type specimen of a new genus and species, Kerberos langebadreae. The genus name Kerberos comes from Cerberus, the hound of Hades, a multi-headed dog that guards the entrance to the Underworld in Greek mythology. The species name, Kerberos langebadreae, is dedicated to the French palaeontologist Dr. Brigitte Lange-Badré, who contributed extensively to the knowledge of Eocene carnivorous mammals. Whereas many hyaenodont species are known only from fragments of the jaw or a few teeth, K. langebadreae represented the first instance where cranial, dental and postcranial material of an early hyainailourine have been found in association with one another.

=== Classification ===
The original study placed K. langebadreae within the subfamily Hyainailourinae. More recent studies, using Bayesian tip dating, placed Kerberos langebadreae as the sister group to Pterodon dasyuroides.

== Description ==
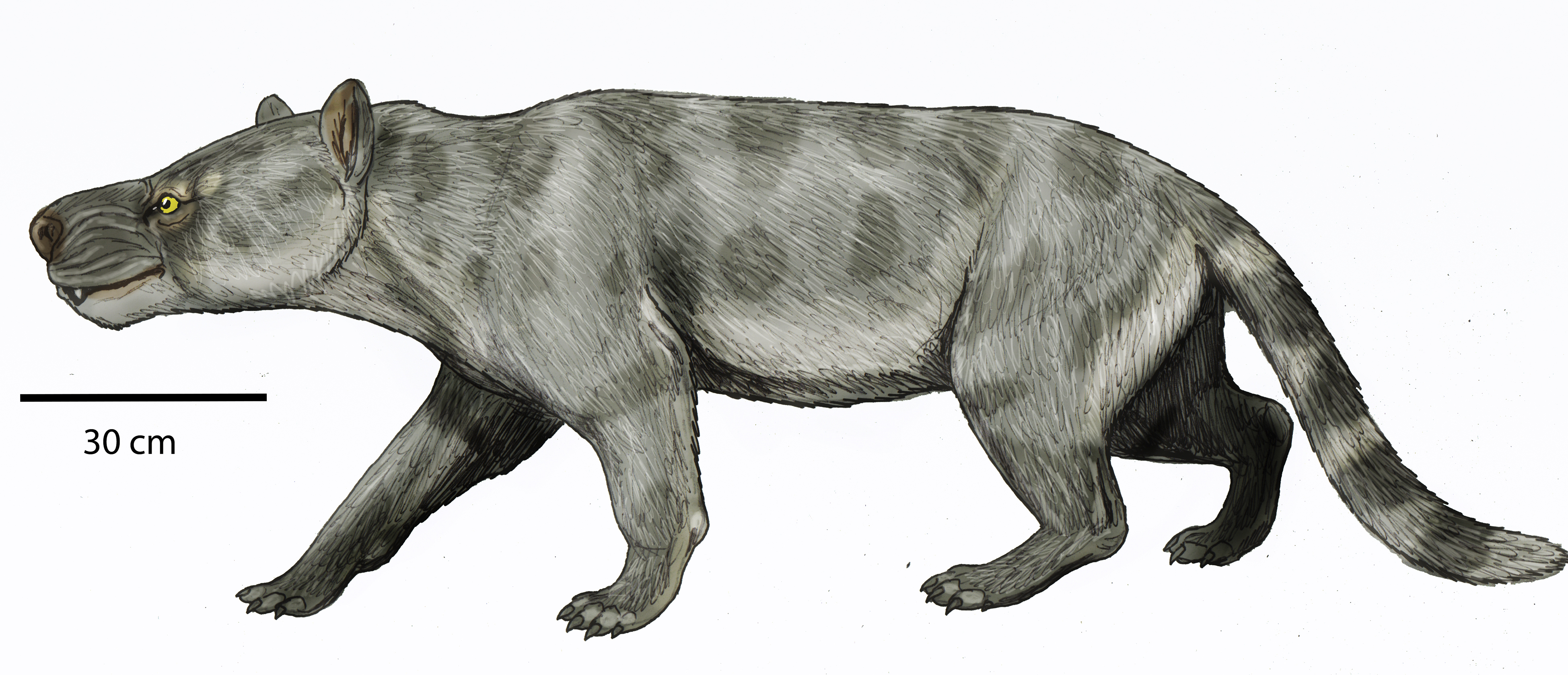
Life restoration

Kerberos langebadreae was a large hyaenodont, one whose anatomy was noted to have combined various primitive and derived feaures. It is diagnosed partly by its body size. To determine its body size, three methods were used, based on measurements of the teeth, skull, and astragalus. These variously resulted in ranges of 49–199 kg (108–439 lb) and 60–269 kg (132–593 lb); the median mass estimate, the one favoured by the authors, was around 140 kg (310 lb). The dentition of Kerberos appears overall adapted for slicing and crushing. The molars likely served as cutting implements, whereas the premolars had shape and wear patterns more consistent with crushing action. Wear patterns on the premolars indicate that its jaws were capable of processing bone, as with modern hyenas, and that it may thus have been osteophagous.

=== Skull and lower jaw ===
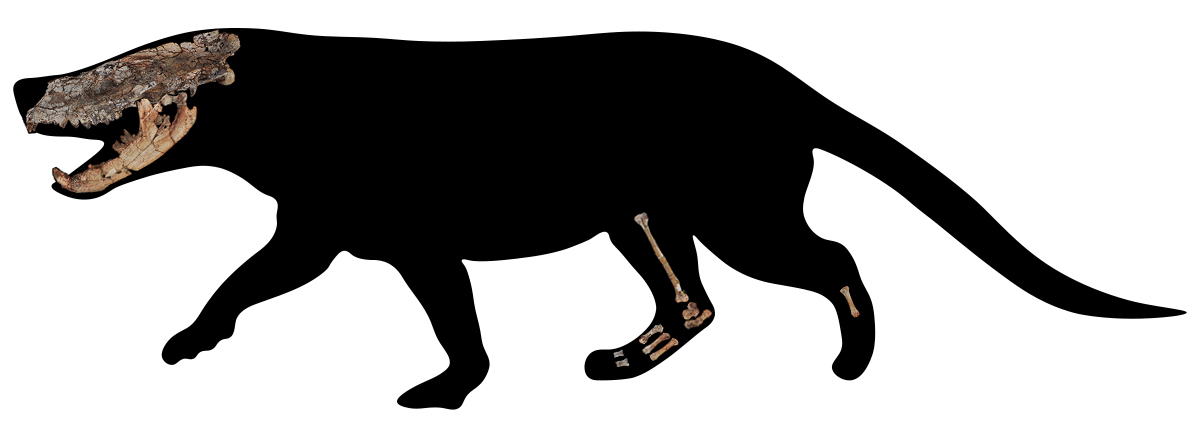
Diagram showing known remains

The holotype skull of Kerberos has a condylobasal length of 35 cm (14 in), similar to that of a female brown bear. It is mostly complete, save for the auditory region (the area around the ear), which is poorly preserved. K. langebadreae was brevirostrine, meaning that it had a short snout, more so than even Hyaenodon brachyrhynchus. Despite this, the ethmoid (the bone at the base of the rostrum) was very long. The nasal aperature was less open than in Cynohyaenodon and in Pterodon dasyuroides. The incisive foramina, holes which would have supplied blood to the gums around the incisors, were shorter anteroposteriorly (from front-to-back) than in P. dasyuroides. The maxilla was weakly convex dorsal to (above) the canine, and at the level of the second upper premolar, it was notably constricted, which also extends to the ventral (bottom) portion of the palate. The nasal bones of K. langebadreae were narrow and triangular in dorsal view, roughly similar in proportional length to P. dasyuroides. The lacrimals were large and their anterior portion contributed to the overall facial skeleton more than usual; the shape of their posterior border is unclear due to damage to the specimen. The jugal bone was essentially straight. Its lateroventral (outer and lower) border was rugose, suggesting that the origin point for the masseter muscle was very large, and thus that adduction was of the mandible would have been very powerful. K. langebadreae's sagittal crest was extremely high, to the point where, at the level of the posterior part of the parietal bone, half of the skull's overall height consisted of it.

The dentary of Kerberos was ventrally convex, particularly the region that is posterior to the alveolar process (tooth row). It had a mandibular symphysis which extended posteriorly up to the root of the third lower premolar. The mandibular ramus was overall fairly straight. A deep fossa for the insertion of the temporalis muscle sat on the anterior margin of the coronoid process, which rose from the relatively straight mandibular ramus at a forty-five degree angle. This fossa was most prominent at its base and extended down to the root of the third lower molar. The angular process relatively thin, and the masseteric fossa was deep and wide.

=== Dentition ===
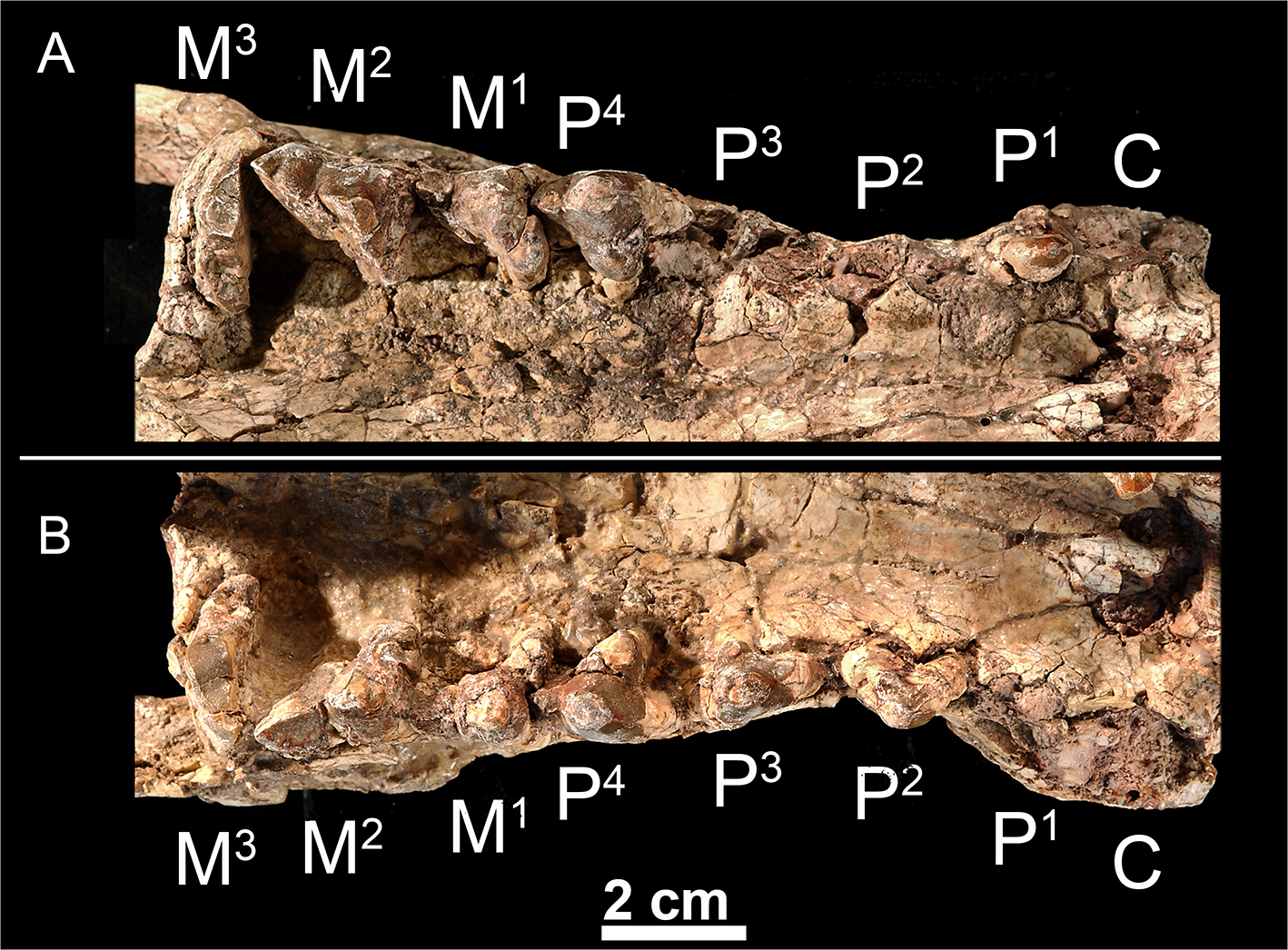
Upper dentition of Kerberos

Kerberos' upper jaw preserves three upper incisors, which were compressed transversely (from side-to-side). The second was fairly conical, whereas the third was considerably larger than the other two and had adopted a caniniform (somewhat resembling a canine) shape. The crowns of the upper canines themselves are not known. The first upper premolar was double-rooted and bore a single paracone and a poorly developed metastyle; the crown of the second is unknown, although the alveolus (tooth socket) preserved indicates that it was similarly double-rooted. The third upper premolar bore three roots, a heavily worn parastyle, and a reduced metastyle, and it had a small protocone lingual to (more inwards than) the paracone. The largest upper premolar was the fourth, which had a well-developed parastyle as in other hyainailourids. None of the upper molars bore a cingulum. The first had a short parastyle, a relatively mesial (towards the midline and towards the back protocone, and a long metastyle; the paracone and metacone were fused into a single amphicone. The second was quite similar to the first, although with a slightly more developed metastyle and parastyle, with abrasion where it would have contacted the third lower molar. The third is fairly elongate, with a long preparacrista, no metacone, and a short protocone.

The lower incisors are not known. The first lower premolar, whose crown is not preserved, was separated from the second by a diastema (gap). The third lower premolar was double-rooted and heavily worn. It bore a slight precingulid, which suggests that a small paraconid was present. The talonid was large and was made up of the hypoconid. The fourth lower premolar was the largest, and is morphologically similar to what has been deduced for the third. The first lower molar, though its crown is unknown, was likely shorter than the fourth premolar and the molars behind it. A metaconid is absent on the second and third lower molars. They differ in talonid shape and size, with the third molar having a larger size and a shorter talonid, though in both, the talonid was fairly simple.

=== Postcranial skeleton ===
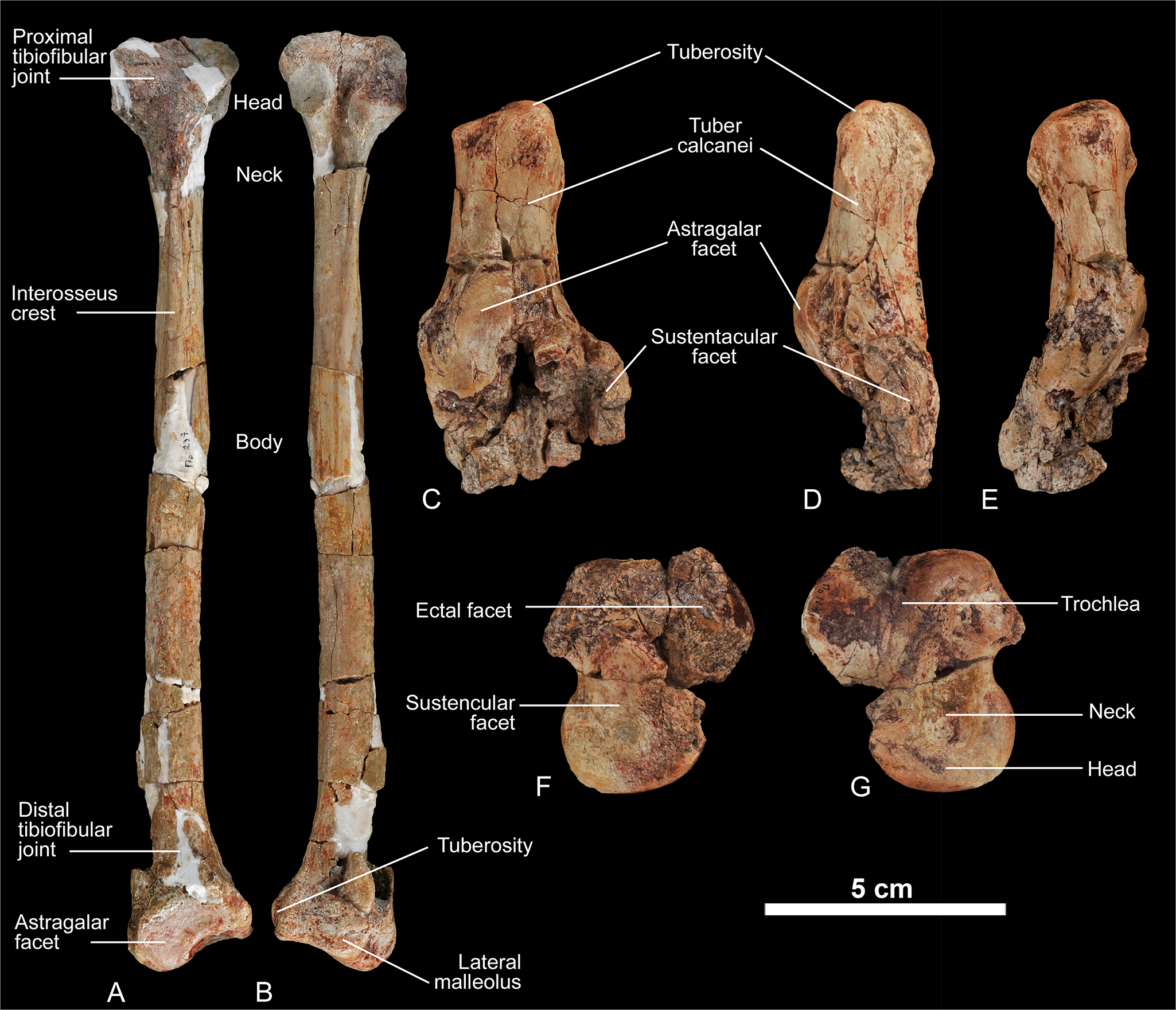
Assorted limb bones from Kerberos

The postcranial skeleton of Kerberos is known from a fibula and several foot bones, including the astragalus, the calcaneus, the first, second, and third metatarsals, and two middle phalanges. The fibula and tibia do not appear to have been fused, and both the distal and proximal heads were large, indicating that the fibula was capable of significant rotation; a similar condition is seen in felids (cats) and ursids (bears), as well as in Hyaenodon. K. langebadreae's lower limb bones had adaptations for a plantigrade posture, one where the foot is flat and the heel contacts the ground, as in bears. The trochlea of the astragalus was shallow with a groove, and its overall morphology is indicative of terrestriality. The calcaneus was short and robust, as were the metatarsals. It is likely that K. langebadreae led a terrestrial mode of life, though was not cursorial like taxa such as Hyaenodon were. Plantigrade locomotion appears to have been the primitive condition among hyainailourines, and was lost in later taxa, such as Simbakubwa, particularly with a shift towards more open habitats.

== Palaeoecology ==
Montespieu, the locality where Kerberos was found, is part of the Sables du Castrais fauna which is thought to be of Bartonian age. K. langebadreae was likely coeval with another large hyainailourine, Paroxyaena, though there is a possibility that it was slightly older. Most of the taxa contemporary with these two genera, such as hyaenodontines and proviverrines, were considerably smaller, and were thus unlikely to have competed directly; indeed, hyaenodontines appear to have had a greater impact on proviverrines than hyainailourines did. Based on the sheer disparity between the body sizes of hyainailourines and the taxa already present, the former appear to have taken niches unoccipied by other mammals upon their arrival. A large non-mammalian predator was present in the area in the form of the sebecid genus Dentaneosuchus. While it has been suggested the extinction of Dentaneosuchus was correlate with the arrival of large mammalian predators, this hypothesis hasn’t been tested. K. langebadreae was capable of both hunting and scavenging, and its describers speculated that it may have been ecologically similar to striped and spotted hyenas. Predators with a body mass in excess of 25 kg (55 lb) often prey on animals as large as, or larger than, themselves, so K. langebadreae likely hunted the large ungulates it coexisted with, such as the artiodactyl, Choeropotamus, and the perissodactyls, Lophiodon and Palaeotherium.
