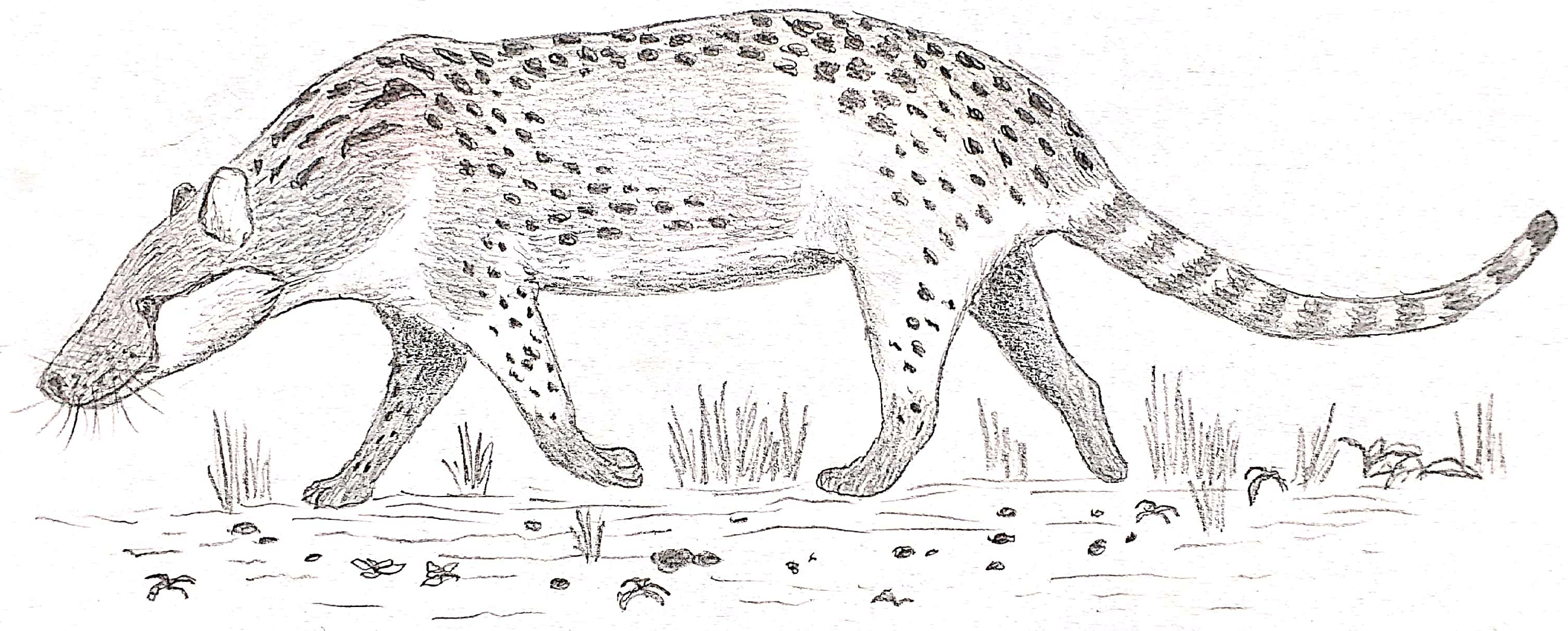
- illustration of Falcatodon schlosseri

Scientific classification
- Kingdom: Animalia
- Phylum: Chordata
- Class: Mammalia
- Order: †Hyaenodonta
- Superfamily: †Hyainailouroidea
- Family: †Hyainailouridae
- Subfamily: †Hyainailourinae
- Tribe: †Hyainailourini
- Genus: †Falcatodon; Morales & Pickford, 2017

Type species
- †Falcatodon schlosseri Holroyd, 1999

Synonyms
- synonyms of species: F. schlosseri: Metapterodon schlosseri (Holroyd, 1999)

= Falcatodon =

Falcatodon Temporal range: 33.9–30.0 Ma Early Oligocene

Species of extinct mammal

Falcatodon ("curved tooth") is an extinct genus of hyainailourid hyaenodonts of the subfamily Hyainailourinae, from the Early Oligocene (Rupelian) of the Faiyum Oasis depression in Egypt.

== Description ==
Morales and Pickford (2017, p. 344) diagnose Falcatodon as follows: "Medium sized Hyainailourinae, differing from Metapterodon by the reduction of the protocone in the upper molars (M1 – M2), which is located in a very anterior position. It differs from Hyainailouros by the more sectorial morphology of the upper molars, with more advanced fusion of the paracone-metacone with, nevertheless, a groove separating the cusps visible in the M1. Lower molars sectorial with reduced talonid and without a metaconid. It differs from Isohyaenodon, Sectisodon and Exiguodon, by the lesser reduction of the protocone in the upper molars which, above all, retain a stretched out subtriangular occlusal outline."

== Classification and phylogeny ==
=== Taxonomy ===
Falcatodon was originally described as a new species of Metapterodon, M. schlosseri by Holroyd (1999), who nonetheless recognized that Eocene and Oligocene hyainailourids he assigned to Metapterodon might prove generically distinct. Subsequent study demonstrated that Falcatodon is not only distinct from Metapterodon but also closely related to Isohyaenodon.
