= Akhnatenavus =

Akhnatenavus Temporal range: Late Eocene–Early Oligocene

Scientific classification
- Kingdom: Animalia
- Phylum: Chordata
- Class: Mammalia
- Order: †Hyaenodonta
- Family: †Hyainailouridae
- Subfamily: †Hyainailourinae
- Genus: †Akhnatenavus; Holroyd, 1999

Type species
- Akhnatenavus leptognathus Osborn, 1909

Other species
- Akhnatenavus nefertiticyon Borths et al., 2016

Extinct genus of hyainailourine hyaenodont

Akhnatenavus is an extinct genus of hyainailourine hyaenodont that inhabited the continent of Afro-Arabia during the Priabonian and Rupelian stages of the Eocene and Oligocene epochs.

== Distribution ==
The species Akhnatenavus nefertiticyon is known from Quarry L-41 of the Jebel Qatrani Formation of Egypt, a fossil site dating to the terminus of the Priabonian stage. The type species of the genus, Akhnatenavus leptognathus, is known from Quarry A, a highly fossiliferous site dating to the Early Oligocene stratigraphically located in the same geologic formation.

== Palaeobiology ==
=== Palaeoecology ===
The maxillary molars of A. nefertiticyon, characterised by a tall, piercing paracone, display an extreme specialisation for hypercarnivory, and this hyainailourid thus likely fed exclusively on meat.
