= Mlanyama =

Mlanyama Temporal range: 24.0–20.0 Ma late Oligocene to early Miocene

Scientific classification
- Kingdom: Animalia
- Phylum: Chordata
- Class: Mammalia
- Order: †Hyaenodonta
- Superfamily: †Hyainailouroidea
- Family: †Hyainailouridae
- Subfamily: †Hyainailourinae
- Genus: †Mlanyama; Rasmussen & Gutierrez, 2009

Type species
- †Mlanyama sugu Rasmussen & Gutierrez, 2009

Extinct genus of mammal

Mlanyama ("carnivore") is an extinct genus of hyainailourid hyaenodont mammal of the subfamily Hyainailourinae, that lived from the Late Oligocene to early Miocene in northwestern Kenya (found at Benson's Site).
