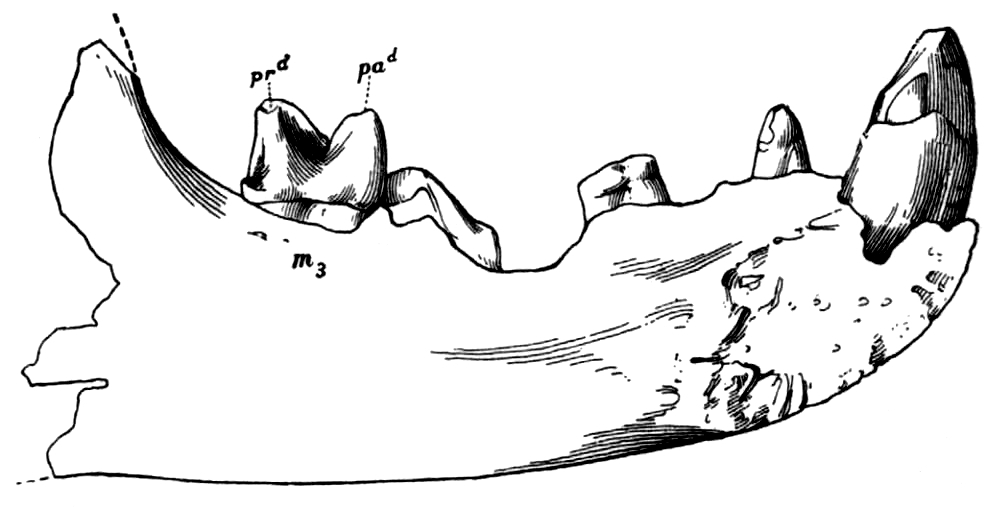
- part of a lower jaw of Metapterodon brachycephalus

Scientific classification
- Kingdom: Animalia
- Phylum: Chordata
- Class: Mammalia
- Order: †Hyaenodonta
- Superfamily: †Hyainailouroidea
- Family: †Hyainailouridae
- Subfamily: †Hyainailourinae
- Tribe: †Metapterodontini; Morales & Pickford, 2017
- Genus: †Metapterodon; Stromer, 1926

Type species
- †Metapterodon kaiseri Stromer, 1926

Species
- †M. anari Mahmood, 2026; †M. brachycephalus (Osborn, 1909); †M. kaiseri (Stromer, 1926); †M. stromeri (Morales, 1998)

Synonyms
- synonyms of genus: Afropterodon (Lavrov, 1999); synonyms of species: M. brachycephalus: Afropterodon brachycephalus (Lavrov, 1999); Isohyaenodon brachycephalus (Savage, 1965); Hyaenodon brachycephalus (Osborn, 1909); Protohyaenodon brachychephalus (Lavrov, 1999); Protohyaenodon brachycephalus (Lavrov, 1999); Pterodon brachycephalus (Van Valen, 1967)

= Metapterodon =

Metapterodon Temporal range: Early to Late Miocene 20–9.8 Ma

Extinct genus of hyainailourid hyaenodonts

Metapterodon ("next to Pterodon") is an extinct genus of hyainailourid hyaenodonts of the subfamily Hyainailourinae, that lived in Africa during the Early to Late Miocene. ^{Including supplementary materials} Fossils of Metapterodon were recovered from Egypt, Uganda, Elisabeth Bay Formation in Namibia, Nagri Formation in Pakistan, and Rusinga Island and Karungu in Kenya.

== Classification and phylogeny ==
=== Taxonomy ===
The Early Miocene species Metapterodon schlosseri and Metapterodon markgrafi have been reassigned to Falcatodon and Sectisodon respectively.
