= Ekweeconfractus =

Ekweeconfractus Temporal range: 17.7–17.3 Ma Early Miocene

Scientific classification
- Kingdom: Animalia
- Phylum: Chordata
- Class: Mammalia
- Order: †Hyaenodonta
- Superfamily: †Hyainailouroidea
- Family: †Hyainailouridae
- Subfamily: †Hyainailourinae
- Genus: †Ekweeconfractus; Flink et al., 2021

Type species
- †Ekweeconfractus amorui Flink et al., 2021

Genus of hyaenodonts

Ekweeconfractus ("broken fox") is an extinct genus of hyaenodont mammal of the hyainailourid subfamily Hyainailourinae, known from 17-million-year-old deposits at the Moruorot site in Kenya.

The genus contains only a single known species, Ekweeconfractus amorui. The full scientific name of type species translates as "broken fox of stone". Known from a single skull with an intact cranium, it is estimated to have weighed around 15 kilograms (33 lb), similar in size to a large fox. The researchers who described and named the fossil were able to conduct a CT scan of the cranial cavity, revealing that the animal had a comparatively large neocortex for the overall size of its brain, and an estimated encephalisation quotient of 0.54, similar to that of other contemporary African hyaenodonts, but lower than that of Hyaenodon.
