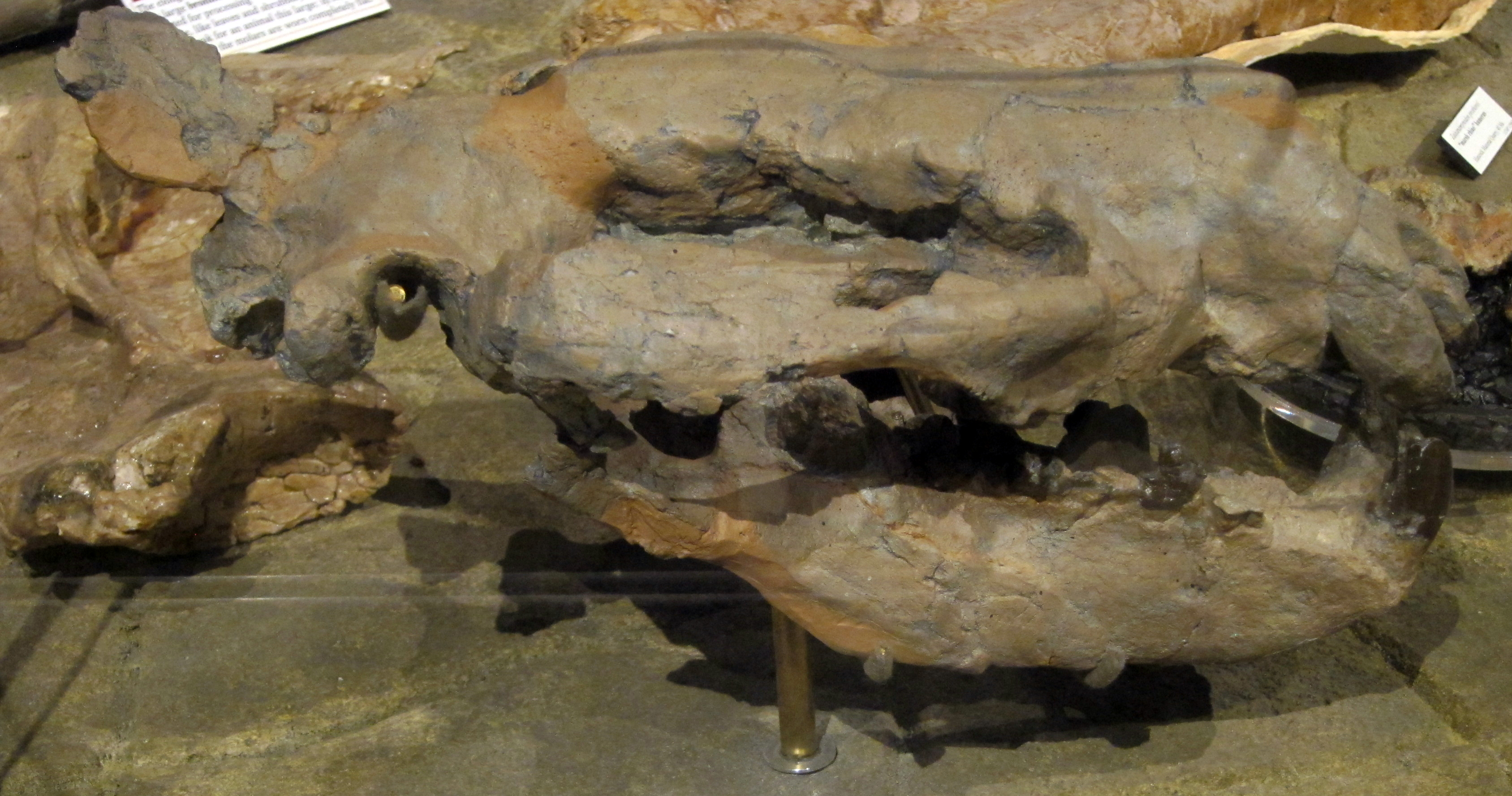
- Skull of Hemipsalodon grandis
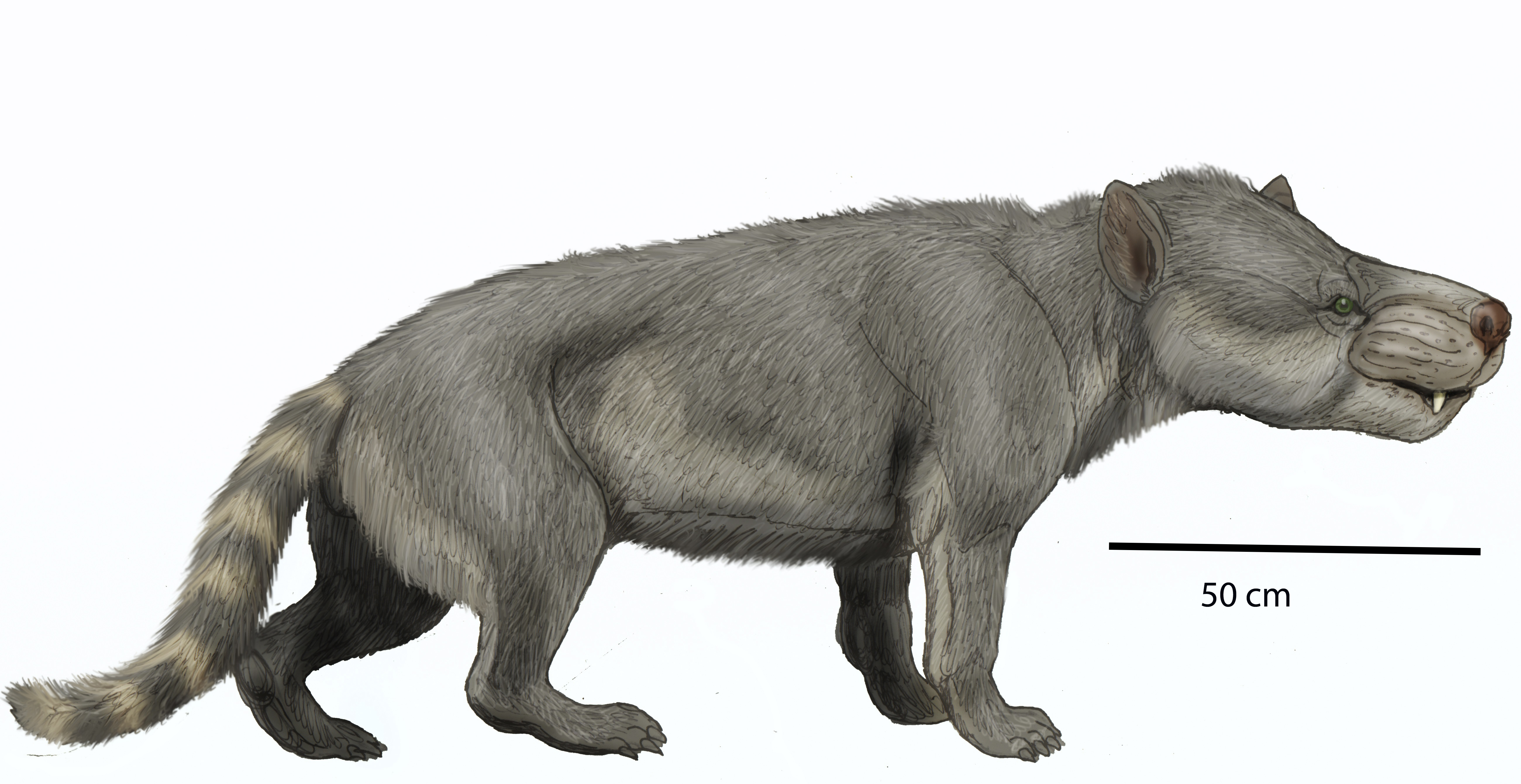
- Restoration of H. grandis

Scientific classification
- Kingdom: Animalia
- Phylum: Chordata
- Class: Mammalia
- Order: †Hyaenodonta
- Superfamily: †Hyainailouroidea
- Family: †Hyainailouridae
- Subfamily: †Hyainailourinae
- Genus: †Hemipsalodon; Cope, 1885

Type species
- †Hemipsalodon grandis Cope, 1885

Species
- †H. grandis (Cope, 1885); †H. viejaensis (Gustafson, 1986)

Synonyms
- synonyms of species: H. grandis: Hemipsalodon cooki (Schlaikjer, 1935)

= Hemipsalodon =

Hemipsalodon Temporal range: Middle to Late Eocene (Duchesnean to Chadronian) 39.7–33.9 Ma

Extinct genus of mammals

Hemipsalodon ("half-scissor tooth") is an extinct genus of hyainailourid hyaenodonts from the subfamily Hyainailourinae that lived in North America during the middle to late Eocene. H. grandis was the largest hyaenodont found in North America, weighing 430–760 kilograms (950–1,680 lb).

== Description ==
The skull of Hemipsalodon grandis is 45 centimetres (18 in) in length, with a lower jaw length of 34 centimetres (13 in). The most complete skull (O.M.S.I. No. 619), belonged to an old individual. It is powerfully-built, and overall superficially resembles the mesonychid Harpagolestes. The nasal opening is quite large. The canines are greatly enlarged. The anterior portion of the skull is broad anteriorly, but narrows down considerably posteriorly. H. grandis was estimated to have weigjed 430–760 kilograms (950–1,680 lb), making it the largest hyaenodont to roam North America.

== Palaeobiology ==
The Hunter-Schreger bands of H. grandis are zigzag, suggesting that this species was osteophagous.

== Paleoecology ==
H. grandis was found in the Calf Creek locality of Cypress Hills Formation. It would've coexisted with fellow hyaenodont Hyaenodon. Carnivorans that were present in this formation were daphoeninae amphicyonids Brachyrhynchocyon dodgei and Daphoneus, nimravids Dinictis and Hoplophoneus, hesperocyonine canid Hesperocyon gregarius, and the subparictid Parictis. Contemporary herbivores include the hyracodontid Hyracodon priscidens, rhinoceroses such as Subhyracodon occidentalis, Trigonias osborni, and Penetrigonias sagittatus, tapirid Colodon occidentalis, brontothere Megacerops kuwagatarhinus, the equid Mesohippus, and the anthracothere Bothriodon advena. The predators present in Calf Creek likely practiced niche partitioning because of their different body sizes. Hemipsalodon, being the largest hypercarnivore present, focused on prey that weighed 780 kg (1,720 lb). The large size of Hemipsalodon would’ve allowed it to prey on large herbivores such as Megacerops kuwagatarhinus.
