= Orienspterodon =

Orienspterodon Temporal range: 42.0–39.0 Ma Middle to Late Eocene

Scientific classification
- Kingdom: Animalia
- Phylum: Chordata
- Class: Mammalia
- Order: †Hyaenodonta
- Superfamily: †Hyainailouroidea
- Family: †Hyainailouridae
- Subfamily: †Hyainailourinae
- Genus: †Orienspterodon; Egi, 2007

Type species
- †Orienspterodon dahkoensis Chow, 1975

Species
- †O. dahkoensis (Chow, 1975); †O. mianchiensis (Sheng, Bi & Li, 2024)

Synonyms
- synonyms of genus: Chinapterodon (Lavrov, 1999); synonyms of species: O. dahkoensis: Chinapterodon dahkoensis (Lavrov, 1999); Pterodon dahkoensis (Chow, 1975); Pterodon dakoensis (Lavrov, 1999)

Extinct genus of mammals

Orienspterodon ("eastern Pterodon") is an extinct genus of hyaenodonts from extinct paraphyletic subfamily Hyainailourinae within paraphyletic family Hyainailouridae, that lived from middle to late Eocene in China and Myanmar. Type species O. dahkoensis was originally assigned to genus Pterodon in 1975, but was eventually assigned to its own genus in 2007.
