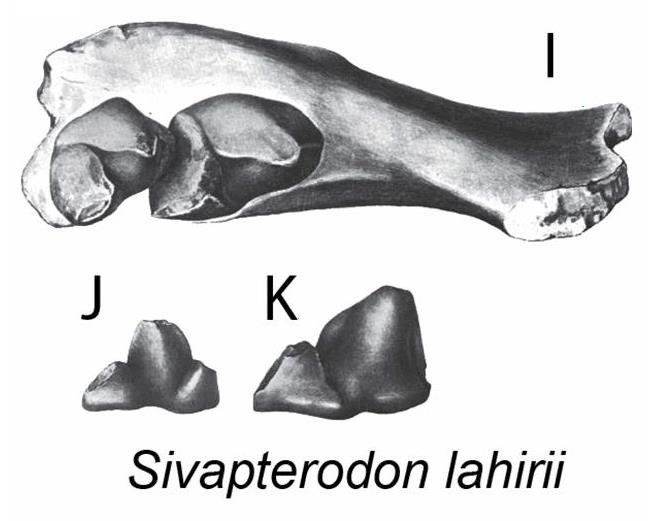
- partial right mandible of Sivapterodon lahirii

Scientific classification
- Kingdom: Animalia
- Phylum: Chordata
- Class: Mammalia
- Order: †Hyaenodonta
- Superfamily: †Hyainailouroidea
- Family: †Hyainailouridae
- Subfamily: †Hyainailourinae
- Tribe: †Hyainailourini
- Genus: †Sivapterodon; Ginsburg, 1980

Type species
- †Sivapterodon lahirii Pilgrim, 1932

Synonyms
- synonyms of species: S. lahirii: Hyaenaelurus lahirii (Pilgrim, 1932); Hyainailouros lahirii (Pilgrim, 1932)

= Sivapterodon =

Sivapterodon Temporal range: 13.7–11.3 Ma middle Miocene

Extinct genus of mammals

Sivapterodon ("Shiva's Pterodon") is an extinct genus of large sized hyainailourid hyaenodont mammal of the subfamily Hyainailourinae that lived in Pakistan during the middle Miocene. The type species is Sivapterodon lahirii. The m1 length of the holotype is 4.97 cm while the p4 dimension is 3.58 x 2.47 cm², which makes it one of the largest hyaenodont.
