= Sectisodon =

Sectisodon Temporal range: 33.9–15.97 Ma Early Oligocene to Early Miocene

Scientific classification
- Kingdom: Animalia
- Phylum: Chordata
- Class: Mammalia
- Order: †Hyaenodonta
- Superfamily: †Hyainailouroidea
- Family: †Hyainailouridae
- Subfamily: †Hyainailourinae
- Tribe: †Hyainailourini
- Genus: †Sectisodon; Morales & Pickford, 2017

Type species
- †Sectisodon occultus Morales & Pickford, 2017

Species
- †S. markgrafi (Holroyd, 1999); †S. occultus (Morales & Pickford, 2017)

Synonyms
- synonyms of species: S. markgrafi: Metapterodon markgrafi (Holroyd, 1999)

Extinct genus of mammals

Sectisodon ("cutting tooth") is an extinct genus of hyainailourid hyaenodont mammal of the subfamily Hyainailourinae from early Oligocene to early Miocene deposits in Egypt and Uganda.

== Description ==
Morales and Pickford (2017, p. 346) diagnose Sectisodon as follows: "Hyainailourinae of small dimensions, M1 and M2 of similar length. M2 with paracone and metacone fused together, tall and pointed. Protocone very reduced, flattened and extending basally beyond the base of the paracone. Anterior cingulum with a well-defined parastyle with a moderate buccal cingulum. M2 and M1 with the metastyle quite a bit longer than the paracone-metacone. P3 short, with tall main cusp, posterior cusplet moderate, and much reduced protocone. Basal lingual cingulum strong, weaker on the buccal side. Lower molars with protoconid bigger than the metaconid, m2 with talonid present, much reduced in the m3."

== Classification and phylogeny ==
=== Taxonomy ===
Sectisodon markgrafi was originally assigned to genus Metapterodon by Holroyd (1999), who nonetheless recognized that Eocene and Oligocene hyainailourids he assigned to Metapterodon might prove generically distinct. Subsequent study demonstrated referred M. markgrafi to Sectisodon based on shared similarities with S. occultus.
