= Osteophagy =

Consumption of bones

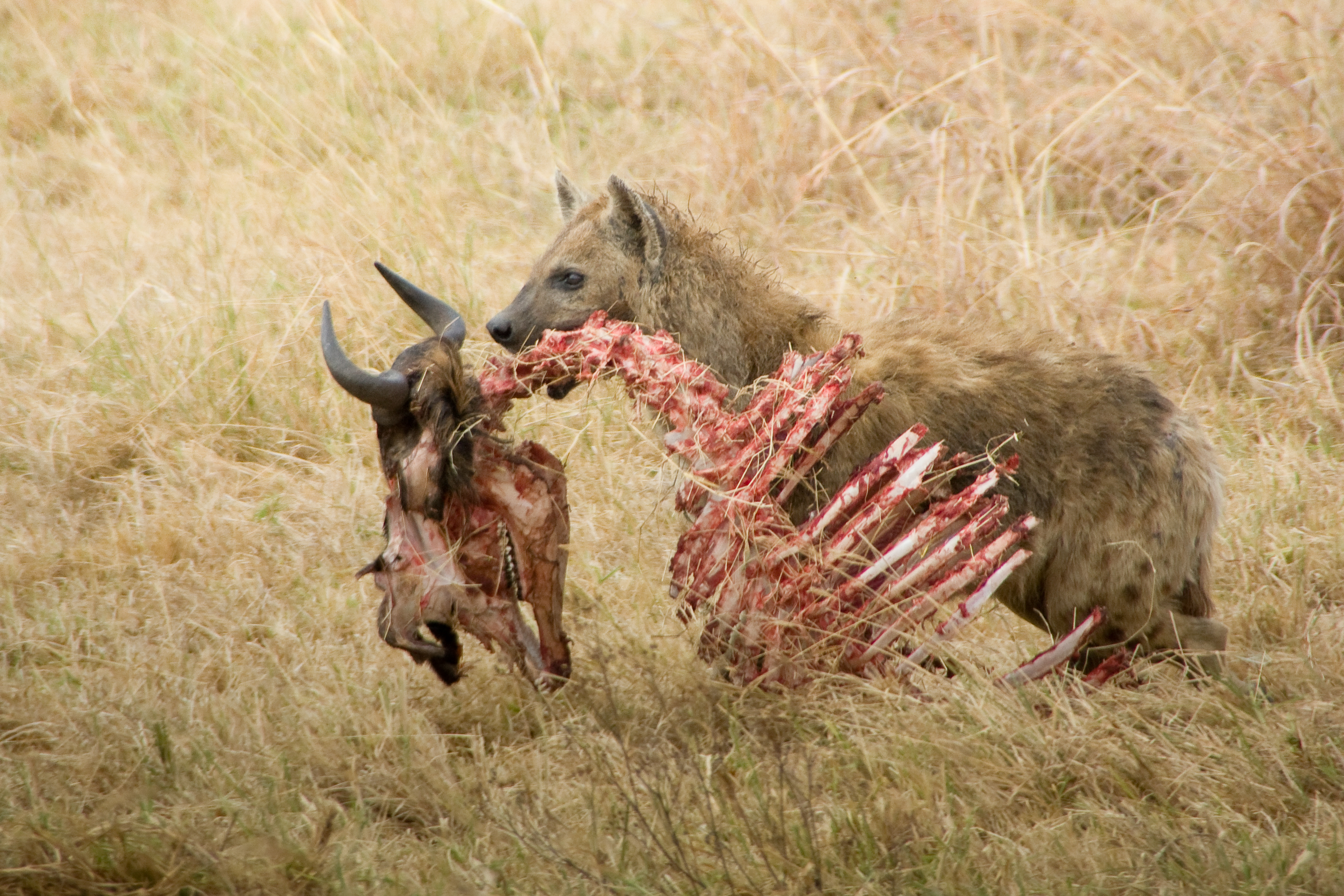
A Spotted hyena chewing a wilderbeest skeleton.

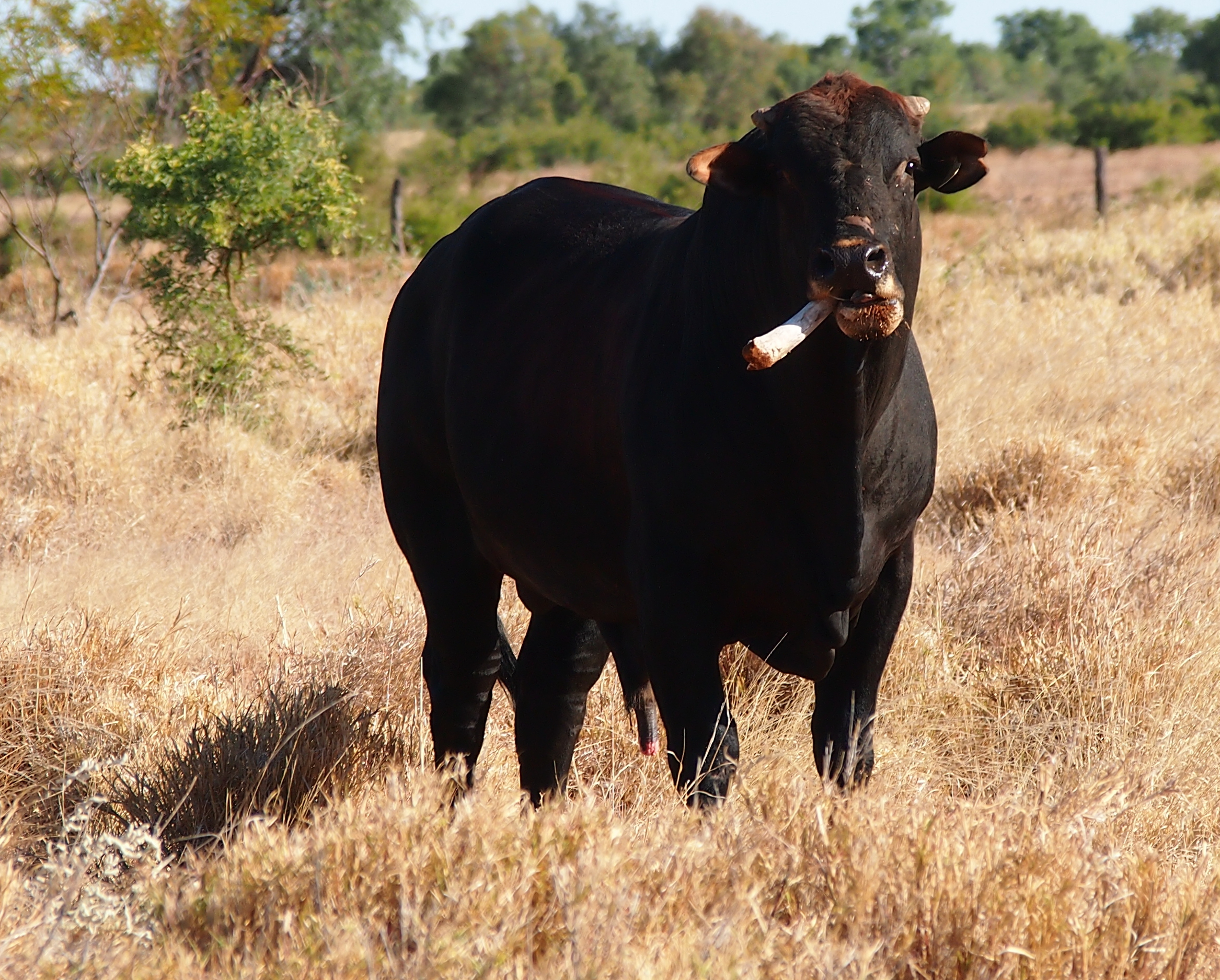
Bull cattle chewing on a bone

Osteophagy is the practice of eating bones. It occurs among both carnivorous and herbivorous animals. Among carnivores, it is an ecological niche where a species can extract more nutrition from the same food resources than competitors can, by being able to crack apart and digest bones. These adaptions may be dental, as in spotted hyenas and wolverines, or physiological and behavioral, as in bearded vultures. Among non-carnivores, the word refers to a behavior where individuals of a species consume bone, usually for supplemental minerals. Some species of herbivore, such as the North American porcupine, are especially attracted to chewing mineral-rich materials, but many mammals that live on vegetation may do so.

Most vegetation around the world lacks sufficient amounts of phosphate to support bone growth. Phosphorus is an essential mineral for all animals, as it plays a major role in the formation of the skeletal system, and is necessary for many biological processes including: energy metabolism, protein synthesis, cell signaling, and lactation. Phosphate deficiencies can cause physiological side effects, especially pertaining to the reproductive system, as well as side effects of delayed growth and failure to regenerate new bone. The importance of having sufficient amounts of phosphorus further resides in the physiological importance of maintaining a proper phosphorus to calcium ratio. Having a Ca:P ratio of 2:1 is important for the absorption of these minerals, as deviations from this optimal ratio can inhibit their absorption. Dietary calcium and phosphorus ratio, along with vitamin D, regulates bone mineralization and turnover by affecting calcium and phosphorus transport and absorption in the intestine.

It has been suggested that osteophagy is an innate behavior that allows animals to supplement their phosphorus and calcium uptake in order to avoid the costly effects of deficiencies in these minerals. Osteophagic behavior has been observed in pastoral and wild animals, most notably ungulates and other herbivores, for over two hundred years. Osteophagy has been inferred from archaeological studies of dental wear in Pleistocene fossils dating back 780,000 years. It has been seen in domestic animals, as well as red deer, camels, giraffes, wildebeest, antelopes, tortoises, and grizzly bears. Due to differences in tooth structure, herbivores tend to chew old dry bones that are easier to break, while carnivores prefer to chew softer fresh bones. Variations of the behavior have also been observed in humans.

While osteophagy has been regarded as a beneficial behavior to combat mineral deficiencies in animals, osteophagic practices have also been observed to be detrimental to the dentition of herbivores. It has been observed that the pattern of wear on the cheek teeth of herbivores is congruous to the manner in which herbivores hold and chew bones. A major cost of osteophagy is therefore significant wear on teeth and dental breakage in herbivores, whose teeth did not evolve to enable the regular consumption of hard materials but rather for the grinding of vegetal fibers.

== Animals ==
=== Wolverine ===
Wolverines are observed finding large bones invisible in deep snow and are specialists at scavenging bones specifically to cache. Wolverine upper molars are rotated 90 degrees inward, which is the identifying dentition characteristic of the family Mustelidae (weasel family), of which the wolverine has the most mass, so they can crack the bones and eat the frozen marrow of large animals. This structural feature helps the wolverine be successful as a scavenger and adapt to a frozen habitat.

=== Porcupine ===
Porcupine species including the largest, African porcupine and North American porcupine, are nocturnal bone collectors of thousands of bones, stored inside their den and in open piles in their vicinity. The bones do not satisfy seasonal nutritional deficiency, they prevent overgrown teeth but the shavings are ingested as the bulk of their diet.

=== Tortoise ===
Osteophagy in desert tortoises has largely been observed in captivity, and more rarely in the wild where osteophagy observed above ground is quick and seldom, usually lasting only a few minutes.

Desert plants are a major food source for desert tortoises (Gopherus agassizii), as they have a mainly herbivorous diet. In addition to desert plants, desert tortoises also consume vulture feces (which contain bones), soil (layers contain calcium), mammal hairs, feathers, arthropods, stones, bones of conspecifics, as well as snake and lizard skin castings. Desert tortoises have been observed to exhibit mounting behavior, aggressive biting, and repeated striking of carcasses when practicing osteophagy.

Osteophagy in herbivores has been viewed to serve as a source for supplemental minerals. Desert plants grow in mineral-deficient soil, and may be a cause of mineral deficiency in desert tortoise diets, resulting in the intake of this supplemental material.

An observational study of tortoises near St. George, Utah, found that the tortoises exclusively consume the Mojave Desert's white stones, which are composed of calcite (mostly calcium carbonate), as opposed to the brown, grey, or other colored stones. The ingestion of these white stones is attributed to the deliberate intake of additional calcium.

Furthermore, it is thought that these additional sources of food are sources of not only calcium, but also other nutrients including phosphorus, sodium, iron, copper, and selenium.

It has also been hypothesized that osteophagy is a practice necessary for the maintenance of desert tortoise shells. This parallels the phenomenon of osteophagy in birds, in which snail shells are ingested by egg-laying females to supplement the increased calcium needed for eggshell formation. Therefore, it would be expected that the increased physiological needs of juvenile and gravid female tortoises would also increase mineral demands and promote ingestion of bones, stones, and soil. Alternatively, the need to consume supplemental minerals may serve the purpose of detoxifying plant compounds, or may serve other purposes not related to nutrition such as to dislodge gut parasites.

=== Cattle ===
In the late 1800s, a then relatively unknown disease called botulism was seen in very high levels in South African cattle, especially those that grazed in pastures with low phosphorus levels. Researchers found that feeding the cattle sterile bonemeal, or maize with unnaturally high levels of phosphorus, nearly eliminated botulism. The simplest conclusion for this was that the botulism symptoms were caused by a lack of phosphorus.

In the early 1900s, Sir Thomas Thieler revisited the issue, and began following herds of cattle to observe their behavior. Incredibly, he found that the phosphorus-deficient cattle would eat the decomposing bones of dead cattle and other animals, and that this activity was highly correlated to botulism. Over the next several years, he was able to show that a bacterial strain living in the decomposing carcasses, Clostridium botulinum, was the true cause of the disease. The cattle would eat the carcasses to replenish their phosphorus deficiency, and would contract the disease.

More recently, in 2005, it was found that cows experimentally depleted of phosphate through the extended provision of a low-phosphate diet exhibited a specific appetite for bones compared to controls who did not develop an interest in bones. After researchers increased blood plasma inorganic phosphate levels in the experimental group of cattle, the appetite for whole bones was suppressed. This experiment provided evidence for the causal link between osteophagy and phosphorus deficiency in cattle.

=== Bears ===
Grizzly bears in the wild have been observed to gnaw on shed moose antlers, which can provide a valuable source of protein, calcium, and phosphorus.

Grizzly bears are at the weakest point into their annual cycle following emergence from hibernation, in terms of lacking mineral and protein nutrition. Grizzly bears (Ursus arctos), after emerging from hibernation, may be experiencing a skewed phosphorus-to-calcium ratio due to the lack of consumption of animal resources during the period of hibernation.

In winter conditions, while grizzly bears may be able to continue to maintain calcium intake with the ingestion of plants and maintain levels of vitamin D from solar radiation, low protein availability results in phosphorus deficiency in grizzly bear diets. This lack of protein during winter conditions can be attributed to the scarcity of animal proteins, a phenomenon that occurs in many ecosystems prior to green-up, or the ending of winter conditions. Therefore, overall, bones can serve as a valuable source of minerals at times where animal protein availability is low.

The resulting phosphorus deficiency in grizzly bear diets results in a skewed calcium to phosphorus ratio and creates an appetite for bone. Because this deficiency is associated with the cycle of the seasons, osteophagy in bears is likely to be a seasonal phenomenon rather than a constant dietary supplement.

=== Giraffes ===
Giraffes rely solely on browsing to maintain their diet, which consists primarily of leafy material. However, they are commonly observed supplementing their diet with bones. Although the exact purpose of this behavior is unknown, it is hypothesized that the ingestion of bones serves as an additional source of calcium and phosphorus. While leaves usually serve as a sufficient source of these nutrients, calcium and phosphorus concentrations in the leaves vary seasonally with rainfall; the giraffes' osteophagic behavior has been observed to parallel this variance in mineral concentration.

The benefits of this behavior remain unclear. Researchers have found that it is actually unlikely that the giraffes can sufficiently digest the bones to extract the calcium or phosphorus. There is also evidence to suggest that osteophagy is associated with the development of kidney stones and medullary and cortical lesions in giraffes due to the nutritional imbalance in their diet.

=== Domestic dog ===
While the media often portrays domestic dogs chewing bones, this is slightly misleading. Dogs chew bones only to eat any residual meat and bone marrow left on them, so it is not truly a form of osteophagy. Most modern toy "bones" for dogs are actually rawhide, which is simply dried animal skin, as animal bones are actually dangerous for dogs to chew.

=== Birds ===
Osteophagic behavior has been frequently observed among several carnivorous bird species including hawks and owls, however the motivations differ from those of the aforementioned herbivores. Presumably, the bird's main purpose is to ingest the maximum amount of soft tissue from their prey as possible often resulting in the consumption of the prey's entire body. The digestible materials are broken down while the indigestible material (i.e. bone) forms a pellet which is then regurgitated. While the regurgitation of the bone is advantageous in that it frees space in the stomach for new prey, the behavior can be harmful in that the pellets are often larger than the digestive tract and could cause damage or obstruction. In addition, the bearded vulture is a specialized bone-eater with bones making up 70–90% of its diet.

== Humans ==
=== Pica ===
Pica is the craving and consumption of non-nutrient substances that can cause health risks. Osteophagy in humans would be considered a form of pica. Unlike calcium and phosphorus in most animals, pica is associated with iron deficiencies in humans. Humans are unlikely to suffer from calcium and phosphorus deficiencies because the minerals are widely abundant in the foods they consume.

Geophagy, the eating of earthen materials like clay, can be another form of pica that is more commonly observed than osteophagy.

=== Religious practice ===
The Yanomami tribe live as nomads in the Brazilian and Venezuelan Amazon. When a tribe member dies, it is a custom for their family to "set their spirit free" in a religious ritual. During this ritual, the tribe grinds their bones to a fine ashen powder and mixes the powder into a plantain soup, which is eaten by the family of the deceased. It is possible that this ritual originated as a way to increase phosphorus and other minerals in the tribe's diet, though it may just be a religious ritual without any other purpose.

== See also ==
- Geophagy
