= Isohyaenodon =

Isohyaenodon Temporal range: 20.0–13.6 Ma Early to Middle Miocene

Scientific classification
- Kingdom: Animalia
- Phylum: Chordata
- Class: Mammalia
- Order: †Hyaenodonta
- Family: †Hyainailouridae
- Subfamily: †Hyainailourinae
- Tribe: †Hyainailourini
- Subtribe: †Isohyaenodontina; Lavrov, 1999
- Genus: †Isohyaenodon; Savage, 1965

Type species
- †Isohyaenodon andrewsi Savage, 1965

Species
- †I. andrewsi (Savage, 1965); †I. zadoki (Savage, 1965)

Synonyms
- synonyms of subtribe: Isohyaenodontini (Lavrov, 1999); synonyms of species: I. andrewsi: Hyaenodon andrewsi (Savage, 1965); I. zadoki: Isohyaenodon matthewi (Savage, 1965); Hyaenodon matthewi (Savage, 1965); Metapterodon zadoki (Savage, 1965); Pterodon zadoki (Van Valen, 1967)

Genus of extinct placental mammals

Isohyaenodon ("equal to Hyaenodon") is an extinct polyphyletic genus of hyainailourid hyaenodont mammal from the subfamily Hyainailourinae). Remains are known from early to middle Miocene deposits in Kenya, East Africa.

== Description ==
Isohyaenodon is distinguished from Hyaenodon in having more robust molars, lower molars with a subequal paraconid and protoconid, and upper molars with a more well-developed protocone.

== Classification and phylogeny ==
=== Taxonomy ===
Isohyaenodon was considered possibly the same genus as Leakitherium from the same region by Van Valen (1967), but subsequent studies have rejected this assumption.

Isohyaenodon pilgrimi Savage, 1965 was formerly assigned to this genus, but has been renamed Exiguodon pilgrimi.
