= Plantigrade =

Walking with the toes and metatarsals flat on the ground

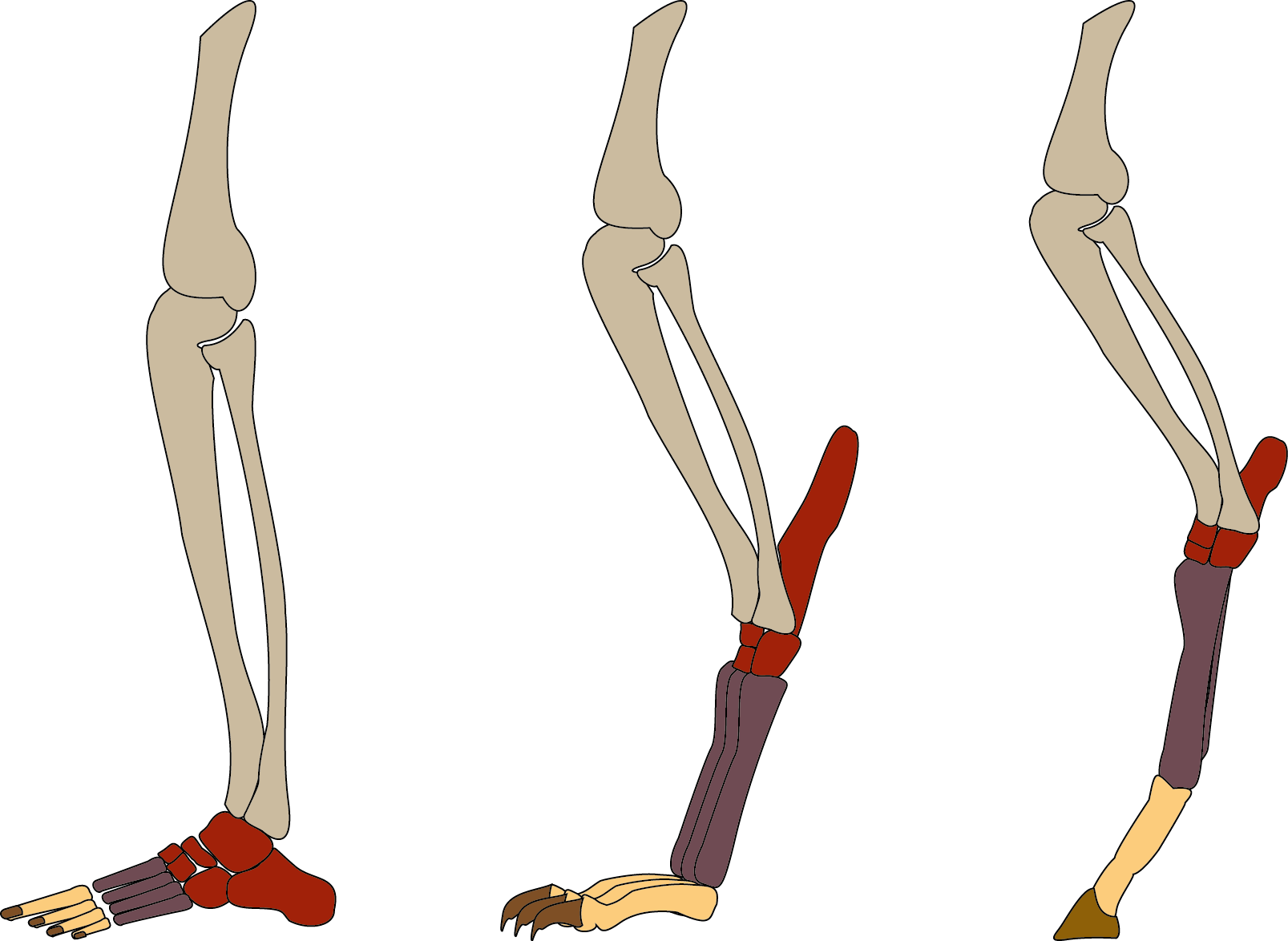
Comparison of lower limb structure. From left to right: plantigrade, digitigrade and unguligrade. In red the basipod, in violet the metapodia, in yellow the phalanges, in brown the keratin nails.

In terrestrial animals, plantigrade locomotion means walking with the toes and metatarsals flat on the ground. It is one of three forms of locomotion adopted by terrestrial mammals. The other options are digitigrade, walking on the toes and fingers with the heel and wrist permanently raised, and unguligrade, walking on the nail or nails of the toes (the hoof) with the heel/wrist and the digits permanently raised. The leg of a plantigrade mammal includes the bones of the upper leg (femur/humerus) and lower leg (tibia and fibula/radius and ulna). The leg of a digitigrade mammal also includes the metatarsals/metacarpals, the bones that in a human compose the arch of the foot and the palm of the hand. The leg of an unguligrade mammal also includes the phalanges, the finger and toe bones.

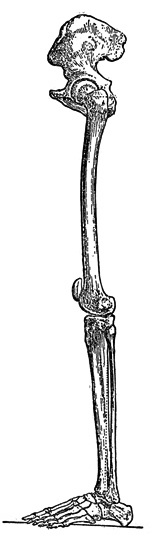
Portion of a human skeleton, showing plantigrade habit

Among extinct animals, most early mammals such as pantodonts were plantigrade. A plantigrade foot is the primitive condition for mammals; digitigrade and unguligrade locomotion evolved later. Among archosaurs, the pterosaurs were partially plantigrade and walked on the whole of the hind foot and the fingers of the hand-wing. Out of the plantigrade animals, only a few, such as humans, kangaroos and certain rodents, are obligate bipeds, while most others are functional bipeds.

== List of plantigrade animals ==
Plantigrade animals species include (but are not limited to):

- Mammals
  - Several primates (including humans and lemurs)
  - Carnivora:
    - Ursidae: bears (with the exception of the hemicyonines)
    - amphicyonids
    - Musteloidea: skunks, raccoons, weasels, badgers, otters, and red pandas
    - Nimravids: false saber-tooth cats
  - Oxyaenids
  - Rodents: mice, rats, porcupines
  - Hedgehogs
  - Hyraxes
  - Marsupialia: kangaroos, opossums
  - Nearly all basal mammals and non-mammalian synapsids were plantigrade
- Birds
  - Loons, grebes, penguins, some auks, and most petrels (except for albatrosses and giant petrels)
- Reptiles
  - Nearly all reptiles (including pterosaurs but excluding dinosaurs (including most birds), which are digitigrade or semi-digitigrade) are plantigrade
- Amphibians
  - All amphibians are plantigrade

== Evolution ==
The primary advantages of a plantigrade foot are stability and weight-bearing ability; plantigrade feet have the largest surface area. The primary disadvantage of a plantigrade foot is speed. With more bones and joints in the foot, the leg is both shorter and heavier at the far end, which makes it difficult to move rapidly.

The evolution of large, fast carnivores over the course of the Cenozoic has been suggested to have placed a constraint on plantigrade mammals from evolving larger body masses relative to digitigrade and unguligrade mammals due to predation pressure.

In humans and other great apes, another possible advantage of a plantigrade foot is that it may enhance fighting performance by providing a more powerful stance for striking and grappling.

Plantigrade foot occurs normally in humans in static postures of standing and sitting. It should also occur normally in gait (walking). Hypertonicity, spasticity, clonus, limited range of motion, abnormal flexion neural pattern, and a plantar flexor (calf) muscle contracture, as well as some forms of footwear such as high heeled shoes may contribute to an individual only standing and/or walking on their toes. It would be evident by the observable heel rise.

== See also ==
- Chebyshev lambda linkage, referred to as the plantigrade machine in its debut.
