= Exiguodon =

Exiguodon Temporal range: 20.0–15.0 Ma Early Miocene

Scientific classification
- Kingdom: Animalia
- Phylum: Chordata
- Class: Mammalia
- Order: †Hyaenodonta
- Superfamily: †Hyainailouroidea
- Family: †Hyainailouridae
- Subfamily: †Hyainailourinae
- Tribe: †Hyainailourini
- Genus: †Exiguodon; Morales & Pickford, 2017

Type species
- †Exiguodon pilgrimi Savage, 1965

Synonyms
- synonyms of genus: Kavirondotherium (Lavrov, 1999); synonyms of species: E. pilgrimi: Hyaenodon pilgrimi (Savage, 1965); Isohyaenodon pilgrimi (Savage, 1965); Kavirondotherium pilgrimi (Lavrov, 1999)

Extinct genus of mammal

Exiguodon ("strict tooth") is an extinct genus of hyainailourid hyaenodont mammal of the subfamily Hyainailourinae. Remains are known from early Miocene deposits in Kenya and Uganda, in East Africa.

== Description ==
Exiguodon is distinguished from other hyainailourines by the following features: diminutive dimensions, lower molars (m3 – m2) with greatly reduced talonid; protoconid and paraconid similar in size. Paraconid of the molars lingually oriented. M2 and M1 close in size and morphology. Occlusal outline sub-triangular, with greatly reduced protocone, which appears like an antero-lingual cingulum which extends anteriorly and buccally. Presence of a strong parastyle in an antero-buccal position, united to the apex of the paracone by a well defined crista. The buccal cingulum borders a wide buccal platform, particularly large in the M2. Paracone tall and narrow, elongated blade-like metastyle. P4 broadened, with reduced protocone and presence of a notch between the main conical cusp and the blade-like posterior cusp.

== Classification and phylogeny ==
=== Taxonomy ===
Exiguodon pilgrimi was originally described as Hyaenodon (Isohyaenodon) pilgrimi by R. J. G. Savage (1965), who coined Isohyaenodon as a subgenus of Hyaenodon. Later authors recognized Isohyaenodon as distinct from Hyaenodon, and Morales and Pickford (2017) eventually realized that pilgrimi was sufficiently distinct from all other African hyainailourines to warrant its own genus, which they named Exiguodon.
