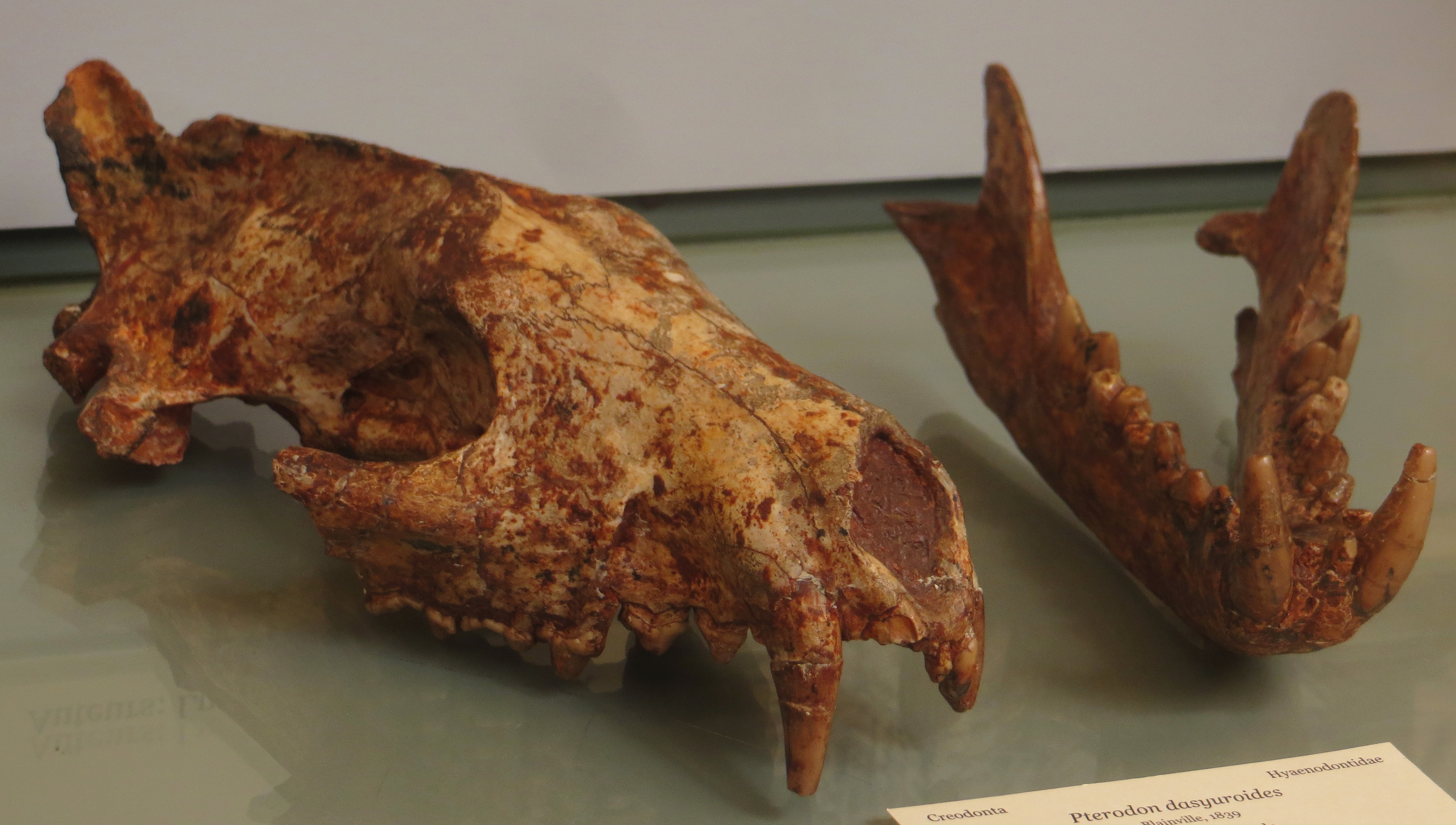
- Pterodon dasyuroides cranium and mandible, National Museum of Natural History, France

Scientific classification
- Kingdom: Animalia
- Phylum: Chordata
- Class: Mammalia
- Order: †Hyaenodonta
- Family: †Hyainailouridae
- Subfamily: †Hyainailourinae
- Tribe: †Hyainailourini
- Genus: †Pterodon; Blainville, 1839

Type species
- †Pterodon dasyuroides Blainville, 1839

Species pending reassessment
- †Pterodon hyaenoides Matthew & Granger, 1925

Synonyms
- Synonyms of P. dasyuroides: Pterodon parisiensis Blainville, 1841–1842; Pterodon cuvieri Pomel, 1853; Pterodon coquandi Pomel, 1853; Pterodon biincisivus Filhol, 1876; Pterodon quercyi Filhol, 1882

= Pterodon (mammal) =

Pterodon Temporal range: Late Eocene (Priabonian), 37.0–33.9 Ma

Extinct genus of mammals

Pterodon (Ancient Greek: πτερόν (wing) + ὀδούς (tooth) meaning "wing tooth") is an extinct genus of hyaenodont in the family Hyainailouridae, containing two species. The type species Pterodon dasyuroides is known exclusively from the Late Eocene of western Europe. The genus was first erected by the French zoologist Henri Marie Ducrotay de Blainville in 1839, who said that Georges Cuvier presented one of its fossils to a conference in 1828 but died before he could make a formal description of it. It was the second hyaenodont genus with taxonomic validity after Hyaenodon, but this resulted in taxonomic confusion over the validities of the two genera by other taxonomists. Although the taxonomic status of Pterodon was revised during the late 19th and early 20th centuries, it became a wastebasket taxon for other hyaenodont species found in Africa and Asia. Today, only the type species is recognized as belonging to the genus while just one is pending reassessment to another genus.

P. dasyuroides had cranial and dental characteristics typical of the Hyainailouridae such as an elongated, narrow, and proportionally large skull which measures ~26 cm (10 in) in length and dentition for hypercarnivorous diets and bone-crushing similar to modern hyenas. Due to the scarcely known postcranial materials of the species, its overall anatomy is unknown, although it likely weighed 51.56 kg (113.7 lb) and may have been similar to another Eocene-aged European hyainailourine Kerberos.

The hyainailourine made its appearance in western Europe back when it was a semi-isolated archipelago, likely originating from a ghost lineage from Afro-Arabia. It was one of the larger-sized carnivores of the continent, a typical trait of hyainailourines. It coexisted largely with faunas that were adapted to tropical to subtropical environments and grew strong levels of endemism, becoming a regular component based on fossil evidence from multiple localities. Pterodon went extinct during Grande Coupure extinction. This extinction event resulted faunal turnover event in the latest Eocene to earliest Oligocene of Europe, which was caused by shifts towards seasonality plus glaciation as well as closing seaway barriers that allowed for large faunal dispersals from Asia. Its extinction has been suggested to result of rapid habitat turnover, competition with immigrant faunas, or some combination of the two. However, competition has been questioned as experts found no evidence of carnivorans competitively replacing hyaenodonts in Europe.

== Taxonomy ==
=== Research history ===
==== Early history ====
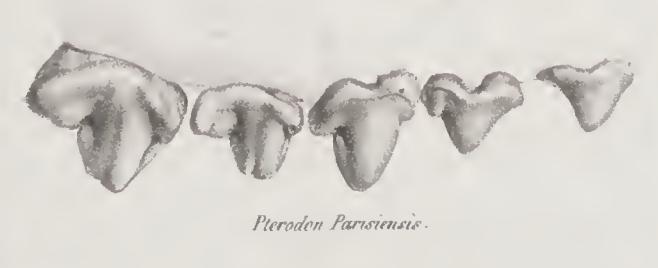
1841-1842 Illustration of the teeth of "Pterodon parisiensis" (= Pterodon dasyuroides)

In 1838, French zoologist Henri Marie Ducrotay de Blainville made a review of palaeontological history and taxonomy as built upon from previous decades. Blainville recognized the importance of dentition in determining the affinities of fossil animals but criticized the overreliance of dental systems as automatically indicating taxonomic affinities. He then went on to examine reported fossil "didelphids" (the taxonomic group now known as "marsupials") in European land. He conducted reviews of fossils as previously described by Laizer and Parieu, concluding that Hyaenodon is a valid genus based on its dentition but rejected the idea of it being a didelph based on its dental system and its molars being closer in affinity to modern carnivorans.

Blainville also mentioned a fossil of an upper jaw that the late Georges Cuvier found and previously thought was close in affinity to the Tasmanian devil (Sarcophilus harrisii) of New Holland (Australia). Previously, Cuvier presented the fossil to the French Academy of Sciences in 1828 and thought that it was a large species of thylacine (Thylacinus cynocephalus) but died before he could make a formal description of it. Of note is that although the article of Hyaenodon by Blainville was first written and published in 1838, it was not until a year later in 1839 when it was republished that Blainville added a footnote to the paragraph about the upper jaw. In it, he said that he restudied that fossil from the Paris Basin and again was certain that it was a "monodelphian" (today placental) predator, which he named Pterodon dasyuroides. The genus name means "wing tooth" and is a combination of the Ancient Greek words "pterón" (wing) and "odoús" (tooth). The etymology of the type species name derives from the Australian marsupial genus Dasyurus and the Greek suffix "-oides" meaning "like" due to apparent initial confusion of the genus affinity by Blainville.

In 1841-1842, Blainville mentioned the genus Pterodon but replaced the previous species name with P. parisiensis. He also stated that despite thinking that the mammal did not have close affinities with Dasyurus, he did not have sufficient skull material to prove what mammal group it was closest to. The species name is in reference to Paris where its first fossil was found.

==== Taxonomic disputes ====
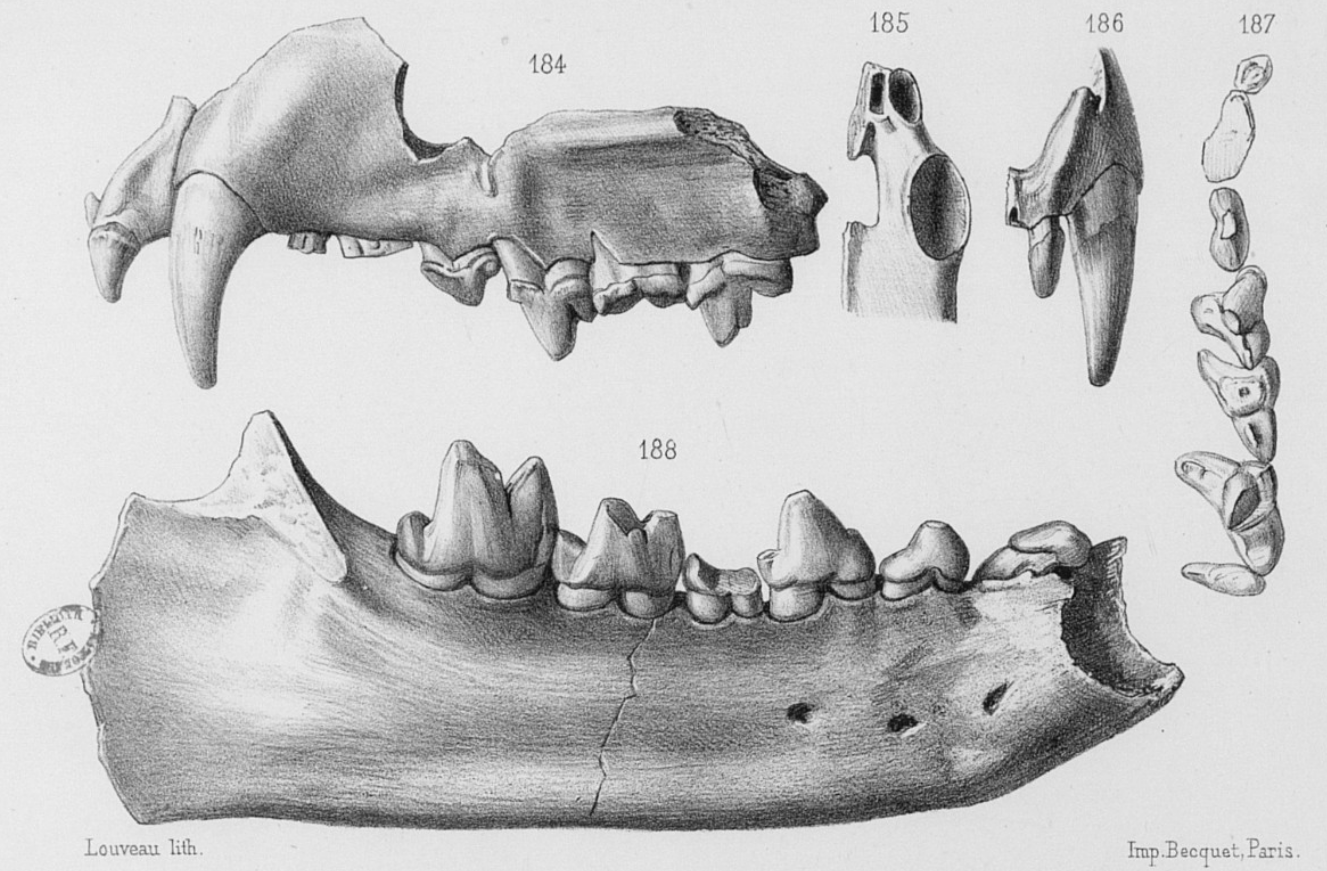
1876 illustrations of cranial plus dental fossil remains of P. dasyuroides (184-188)

The taxonomic positions of Pterodon and Hyaenodon for much of the 19th century were disputed by many palaeontologists. In 1846, Auguste Pomel argued that he was unsure if Pterodon belonged to the didelph clade based on its dentition being apparently similar to thylacines but having different skull structures from them and other marsupials. However, he rejected the position that Pterodon was more closely related to the monodelphs due to thinking that the skull did not closely resemble its members. Additionally, he said that it, Taxotherium, and Hyaenodon are functionally the same genus if not the same species, therefore stating that the latter two genera are synonymous with Pterodon. Pomel defined four species for the genus Pterodon: P. parisiensis, P. cuvieri (erected previously for Taxotherium as T. parisiense by Blainville), P. leptorhynchus (erected for Hyaenodon by Lazier and Parieu), and P. brachyrhynchus (previously named for Hyaenodon by Blainville).

In 1846, Paul Gervais recognized the species P. requieni, having named the species in honor of French naturalist Esprit Requien, the founder and director of the Musee d' Avignon (now the Musée Requien) who allowed him and Marcel de Serres to study local fossil mammal specimens. In 1848-1852, however, he reclassified the species as Hyaenodon requieni (having recognized the validity of the genus) and listed P. dasyuroides as the only species of Pterodon.

In 1853, Pomel changed his position by recognizing the validity of Hyaenodon, restoring the taxonomic affinities of species previously classified as belonging to it and therefore establishing that they no are no longer classified under Pterodon (H. leptorhynchus and H. brachyrhynchus). He also reclassified Taxotherium as a junior synonym of Hyaenodon instead of Pterodon. Within the genus Pterodon, he recognized the species name P. dasyuroides instead of P. parisiensis and created two additional species based on dentition shapes and sizes: P. cuvieri and P. coquandi.

==== European hyaenodont revisions ====
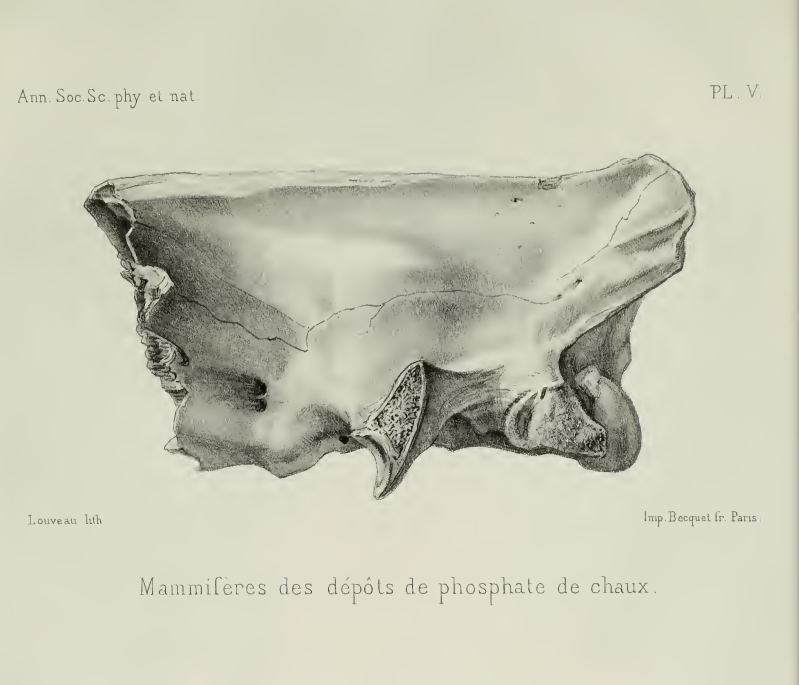
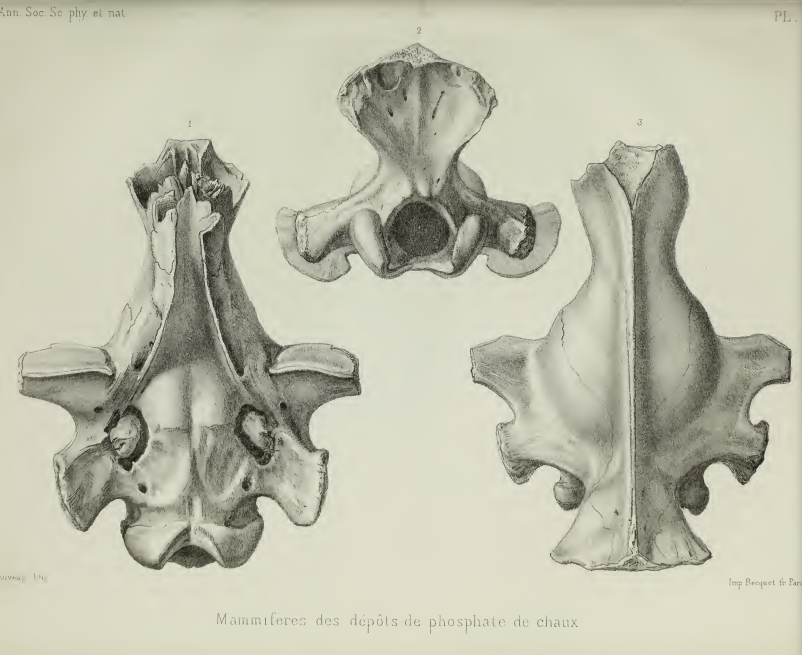
1882 illustrations of anterior skull portions of P. dasyuroides from the phosphate deposits of Limogne-en-Quercy

Gervais erected the species P. exiguum in 1873 based on dentition with some similarities to both Pterodon and Hyaenodon but noted that it may constitute a new genus once he has more fossil material. The palaeontologist then corrected himself in 1876 by stating that the species belongs to Hyaenodon as H. exiguum, not Pterodon.

In 1876, Filhol recognized only P. dasyuroides among all species previously erected for the genus and named a new species P. biincisivus from the phosphorite deposits of Escamps, France. He, in addition to confirming the taxonomic validities of the two species, erected a third named P. quercyi in 1882. The French naturalist named a new species Oxyaena galliæ based on dental remains being apparently similar to that of species of Oxyaena previously described by Edward Drinker Cope in the Eocene deposits of New Mexico, United States. in The same year, Filhol also reported that an individual whose last name was Pradines recently discovered anterior portions of the skull of P. dasyuroides from the phosphate deposits of Limogne-en-Quercy.

English naturalist Richard Lydekker made a review of known pan-carnivoran genera in 1884, classifying them within the order Carnivora and rejecting Cope's classification of the members into the suborder Creodonta within the order Bunotheria. While Cope originally assigned Hyaenodon as the sole member of Hyaenodontidae and Pterodon plus Oxyaena into Oxyaenidae, Lydekker felt that Pterodon was close in affinity to Hyaenodon and therefore belonged in Hyaenodontidae. For H. brachyhynchus, he listed P. brachyhynchus, P. requieni, and H. requieni as junior synonyms. He also listed P. leptorhynchus as a junior synonym of H. leptorhynchus as well as H. exiguus and P. exiguus as synonyms of H. vulpinus. For Pterodon, he recognized P. dasyuroides as the main valid species of the genus and listed P. parisiensis as a definite synonym as well as P. cuvieri and P. coquandi as possible synonyms, although he did not invalidate P. biincisivus. He also listed the species Oxyæna galliæ but thought that the genus could be merged into Pterodon due to minor dental differences and similarities to P. biincisivus.

Swiss palaeontologist Ludwig Rütimeyer erected another species named P. magnus in 1891 based on the larger dentition sizes compared to typical species of Pterodon. However, in 1906, German scientist Rudolf Martin said that he wanted to synonymize P. magnum and the questionable P. quercyi with P. dasyuroides. He also listed P. biincisivus as a synonym of P. dasyuroides and stated that only one species is valid within Pterodon. Additionally, he revalidated the species O. galliæ but created the genus Paroxyaena for it, arguing that because oxyaenids are very weakly represented in Europe compared to North America and that therefore the species' similarities to oxyaenids may have an instance of convergent evolution.

In 1979, Brigitte Lange-Badré made a systematic review of known hyaenodonts from Europe including Pterodon. She listed P. parisiensis, P. cuvieri, P. coquandi, P. biincisivus, and P. quercyi as synonyms of the only European species P. dasyuroides. In addition, she listed P. magnum as a synonym of Paroxyaena galliae and listed Hyaenodon exiguus as taking taxonomic priority over H. vulpinus, therefore making the latter name and P. exiguum synonyms.

==== Wastebasket history ====
For much of its history, Pterodon was a wastebasket taxon for middle to late Paleogene and Miocene hyainailourines that lacked unique or advanced dental traits that Hyaenodon had. Many of the species classified or formerly classified to Pterodon were of African or Asian origins. Within the 20th century, the species formerly classified to the genus Pterodon were Apterodon macrognathus, Akhnatenavus leptognathus, "Hyainailouros" bugtiensis, Orienspterodon dahkoensis, and Neoparapterodon rechetovi. Several species names previously assigned to Pterodon were later considered to be synonyms of Hyaenodon species, namely "P. exploratus" (= H. incertus), "P. californicus" (= H. vetus), and "P. mongoliensis" (= H. mongoliensis). Also, both "Pterodon nyanzae" and "Hyainailouros nyanzae" were synonymized with Hyainailouros napakensis. Additionally, Hemipsalodon was made a synonym of Pterodon by Robert Joseph Gay Savage in 1965 while Metapterodon was synonymized with it by Leigh M. Van Valen in 1967, but the synonymies were unsupported by later authors.

In 2025, the three African species previously assigned to Pterodon, P. africanus; P. phiomensis; and P. syrtos; were reassigned to newer genera. Shorouq F. Al-Ashqar et al. erected Sekhmetops for the former two species and Bastetodon for the latter. As a result of the synonymies, only one species assigned to Pterodon remains pending reassessment to another genus: P. hyaenoides, which is classified as belonging to the Hyaenodontinae and is located in Asia.

In 1999, A.V. Lavrov mentioned in his dissertation paper a genus he erected named "Epipterodon" for which "Pterodon" hyaenoides would have been reclassified to. However, as the genus name has not yet been referenced and taxonomically validated in any peer-reviewed source, its name currently remains invalid.

=== Classification ===
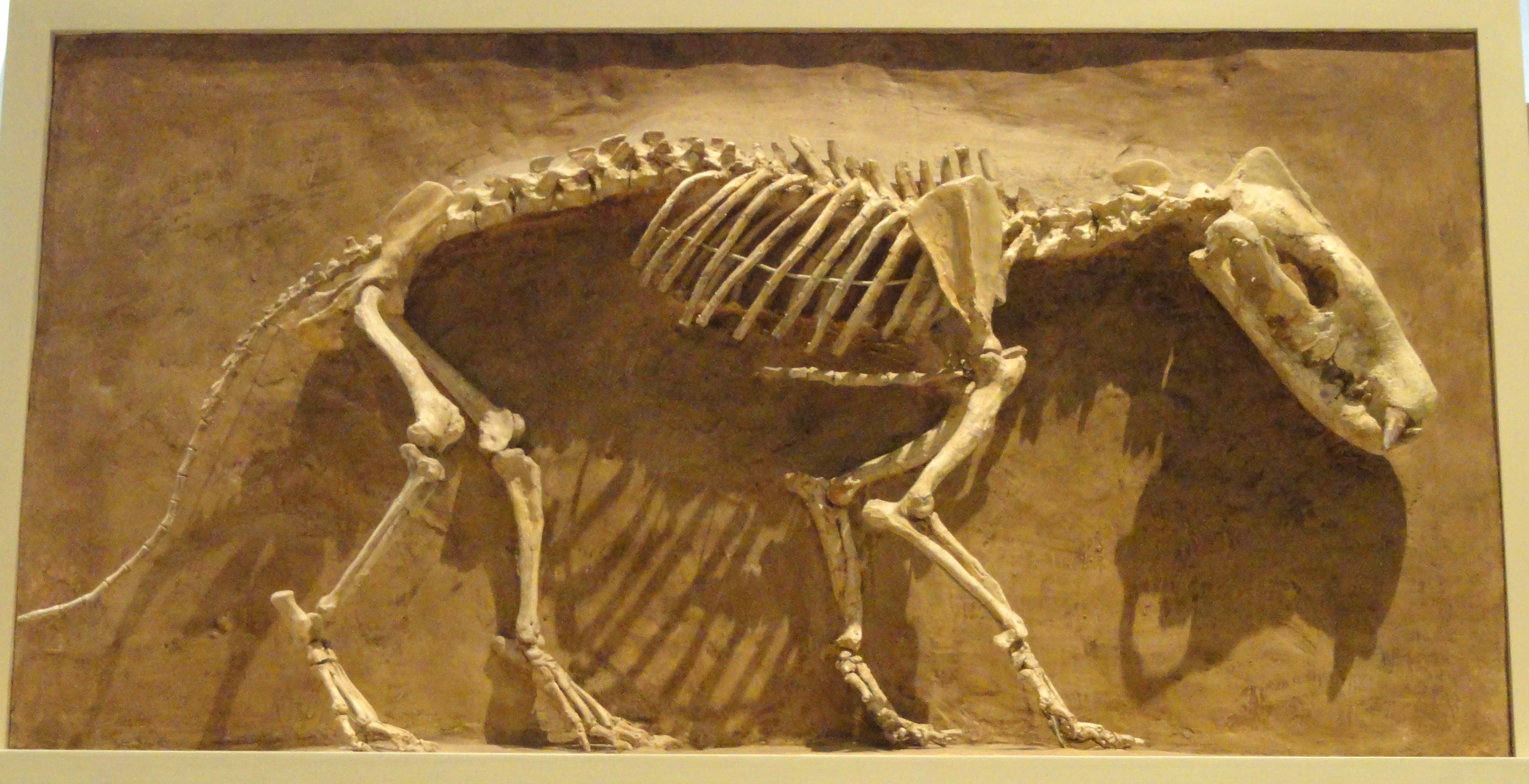
Skeleton of Hyaenodon horridus of North America. The Hyaenodontidae was recently determined to have been a separate lineage from the Hyainailouridae.

Pterodon has historically been classified undisputedly as at least being within the clade of hyaenodonts within the later 20th century, later being included within the subfamily Hyainailourinae. However, it was since 2015 that Floréal Solé et al. proposed the clade Hyainailouridae, uniting the Hyainailourinae and Apterodontinae under the family and therefore making it taxonomically differentiated from the Hyaenodontidae. They also suggested usage of the hyainailourine tribes Hyainailourini (where Pterodon was classified) and Paroxyaenini, although the tribe name usages for hyaenodonts remain uncommon in academic literature. In 2016, Matthew Borths et al. suggested that the Hyainailouridae had a close relationship with the Teratodontinae and therefore arranged the superfamily Hyainailouroidea to include them and include the Proviverrinae, Hyaenodontidae, and North American hyaenodont groups. The family Hyainailouridae has since become more accepted in academic literature, although there are alternate clade rank methods for hyainailourines.

The order Hyaenodonta (replacing the now-invalidated clade Creodonta) is known first from the middle Paleocene of Afro-Africa, expanding to both Europe and Asia from Afro-Arabia in multiple "out-of-Africa" dispersal events. Although the true origins of the Hyainailouroidea is somewhat ambiguous, the Bayesian topologies support evidence that the Hyainailourinae, Apterodontinae, and Teratodontinae all had Afro-Arabian origins. Hyaenodonts made their first appearances in Europe in terms of the Mammal Paleogene zones by MP7 (or early Eocene), mostly predominantly the Proviverrinae. In terms of carnivorous mammal assemblages of Europe, MP8-MP10 marked the extinctions of the Viverravidae, Oxyaenidae, Sinopinae, and Mesonychidae. As a result, the endemic hyaenodonts and carnivoraforms remained the two only carnivorous mammal groups for much of the Eocene of Europe. Hyaenodonts were more diverse than carnivoraforms for much of the Eocene and increased in diversity with the appearances of the hyainailourines in MP16 and hyaenodontines in MP17A. The former group likely dispersed from Africa while the latter may have dispersed from Asia. Compared to the proviverrines which never exceeded 20 kg (44 lb), the hyainailourines were much larger in size.

Pterodon as defined sensu lato (in a loose sense) is polyphyletic when including species other than P. dasyuroides. This is because P. dasyuroides does not form a natural clade with non-European species classified within the genus, therefore meaning that they are pending reassessments to other genera. Pterodon sensu stricto (in a strict sense) made its appearance in western Europe by MP18 (late Eocene) in the form of P. dasyuroides and lasted up to MP20. P. dasyuroides was likely part of a ghost lineage of dispersing hyainailourines from Africa, and Kerberos did not appear to have descended into Pterodon or Parapterodon.

The phylogenetic tree for the superfamily Hyainailouroidea within the order Hyaenodonta as created by Floréal Solé et al. in 2021 is outlined below:

- Hyainailouroidea
  - Parvavorodon gheerbranti
  - - Glibzegdouia tabelbalaensis
    - Indohyaenodon raoi
  - - Hyainailouridae
      - Apterodontinae
        - Quasiapterodon minutus
        - - Apterodon macrognathus
          - - Apterodon gaudryi
            - Apterodon langebadrae
      - Hyainailourinae
        - - - - Akhnatenavus leptognathus
              - Akhnatenavus nefertiticyon
            - Hemipsalodon grandis
          - - - - Exiguodon pilgrimi
                - Isohyaenodon zadoki
              - Falcatodon schlosseri
              - - - - - Hyainailouros bugtiensis
                      - Sivapterodon lahirii
                    - Isohyaenodon andrewsi
                  - Hyainailouros napakensis
                - - Hyainailouros sulzeri
                  - Arrisdrift hyainailourine
                - Simbakubwa kutokaafrika
              - - Leakitherium hiwegi
                - Megistotherium oseothlastes
              - - Megapterodon kaiseri
                - Mlanyama sugu
              - Sectisodon markgrafi
            - Prionogalidae
              - - Namasector soriae
                - Prionogale breviceps
              - Thereutherium thylacodes
            - Pakakali rukwaensis
          - - Kerberos langebadrae
            - Pterodon dasyuroides
          - Paroxyaena spp.
          - - Pterodon africanus
            - Pterodon phiomiensis
        - Orienspterodon dahkoensis
    - Teratodontinae
    - Furodon crocheti
    - - Koholia atlasense
      - Tritemnodonm agilis
    - Kyawdawia lupina
    - Paratritemnodon indicus

== Description ==
=== Skull ===
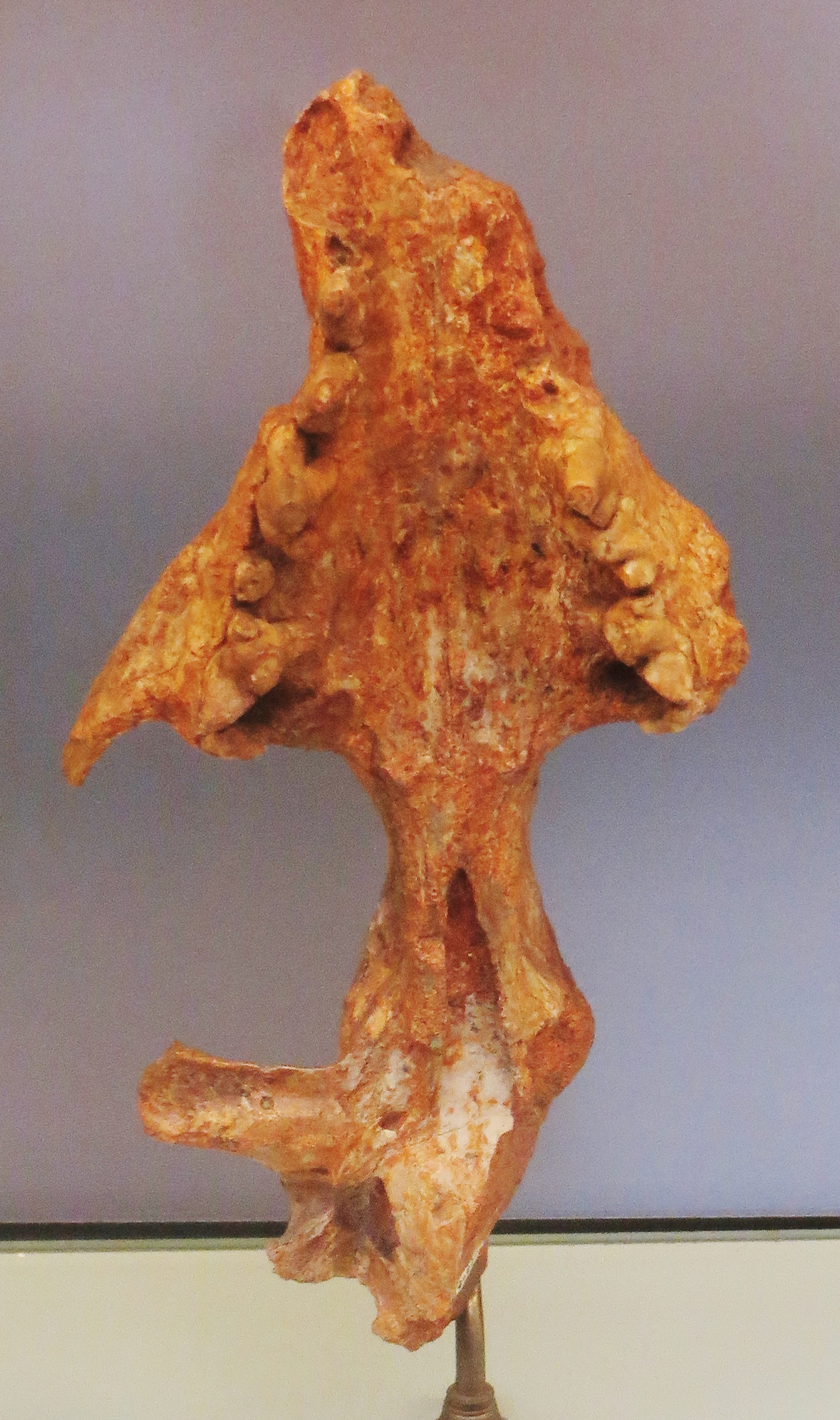
Upper portion of the skull of P. dasyuroides

The order Hyaenodonta is diagnosed as having an elongated and narrow skull with a narrow cranial base (basicranium), a high and narrow occipital bone, and a transversely constricted interorbital region. Within the order, members of the Hyainailouridae share traits including a proportionally massive skull with an absence of any suture between the parietal bone and frontal bone, and a weak postorbital process (or projection), an extended pterygoid bone in its underside and side areas, the presence of a preglenoid crest, and side expansions of the squamosal relative to the back position of the zygomatic arch.

The skull of P. dasyuroides (specimen Qu8301, National Museum of Natural History, France) was described by Lange-Badré in 1979 as retaining proportions similar to members of the Proviverrinae, its maximum height barely reaching a third of its maximum length because of a lack of elevation of the cranial vault. The muzzle is narrow and cylindrical in shape, barely projecting at the level of the roots of the canines. The cranium is equally as narrow, is shaped like an hourglass, and is shorter than the facial skeleton. The known skull measures 26 cm (10 in) in length, and it is similar to that of Kerberos in being elongated and having a long rostrum and neurocranium. It is one of the two only known Eocene hyainailourine genera to be known by skull material, the other being Kerberos.

In the upper view of the skull, the nasals are convex dorsally (top area in the case of the skull) and extend far into the back beyond the front edge of the orbit. A short tubercle emerges from the nasals into the lacrimal bone, and then the nasals come into contact with the frontal bone by a W-shaped suture. The frontal eminences of the frontal bone, or the rounded elevations of the front of the upper skull, are not very prominent based on the weak depressions that are widely open. The skull lacks any postorbital process projections within its front area. The blunt brow ridges arise back from the upper edge of the orbits as triangular-shaped roughnesses and arrive at the sagittal plane area in front of the post-orbital constriction. The coronal suture is destroyed in known specimens and therefore has an unknown position relative to the post-orbital constriction. The cranial vault is formed by the two parietal bones, and is gradually detached from the high and thin sagittal crest, which meets with the supraoccipital crest and forms a small triangular facet. The maximum width of the cranium barely exceeds that of the frontal bones at the upper edges of the orbits.

In a lateral (or side) view, the premaxillae are short and extend a small distance between the nasals and maxillae, slightly preceding the canines. Their thick upper front edges form a roughly heart-shaped and subvertical nasal opening with a maximum width at the level of the nasal premaxillary suture. There is a slight projection of the root of the canine on the upper maxilla which is followed by an elongated depression that precedes that the long, narrow opening of the infraorbital canal. The lacrimal bone extends widely onto the face in a large semicircle shape which restricts frontal-maxillary contact. There is no lacrimal tubercle present in the skull. The squamosal suture is low in position, not very convex, and is very inclined towards the zygomatic arches, explaining the triangular cross section of the skull. The squamosal roots of the zygomatic arches are found in a completely marginal position and, unlike modern carnivorans, are not under the temporal wall of the skull but outside it. The mastoid part of the temporal bone is between the retrotympanic part of the squamosal and the paroccipital process of the exoccipital region. While the zygomatic arches were not completely preserved in P. dasyuroides, those of the related Apterodon macrognathus and Kerberos langebadreae are dorsoventrally deep for robustness to support masseter muscles.

The face of the occipital bone is narrow and has a fan-like shape due to the strong narrowing at the level of the supraoccipital-squamosal suture followed by a strongly concave squamous part of the occipital bone. Due to this development, it differs strongly from that of Hyaenodon but is comparable to that of Apterodon.

Typical of mammals with elongated snouts, the lower edge of the mandible (specimen Qu8636, National Museum of Natural History, France) is slightly curved. After the receding mandibular symphysis region, the mandible is rectilinear without any change in shape in the preangular region. The angle of the mandible is short and stocky for which the medial pterygoid muscle would have connected to.

=== Endocast anatomy ===
P. dasyuroides is known by a brain endocast, which was first described by Jean Piveteau in 1935. The natural endocast is stored at the National Museum of Natural History, France with no catalogue number. It is estimated to have an endocast volume of 60 cc (3.7 cu in). Only limited morphologies can be observed as that of the surface was not well-preserved. The endocast shape reflects well the general appearance of the rectilinear sagittal profile of the skull. There is an absence of any form of occipital tilt, and the brain endocast is made up of the olfactory bulbs, the cerebrum, and the cerebellum. The back view of an artificial endocast as studied by Lange-Badré reveals that it has a triangular to ovate shape, with its olfactory bulbs as its top part and the cerebellar hemispheres. The maximum height of the brain cast is at the level of the cerebellum. Overall, the molding appears low in position, the cerebellum taking up a large volume of it compared to the cerebrum.

The olfactory lobes, the structures involved in the sense of smell, are not covered by the cerebral hemispheres and diverge from each other somewhat. It is detached from the structures of the olfactory nerve which crossed into the cribriform plate of the ethmoid bone. The olfactory peduncles attach the olfactory bulbs to the non-prominent olfactory tubercles. Within the rhinencephalon, the piriform cortex is the most voluminous section, appearing folded under the neocortex and having a compact shape.

The neocortex of P. dasyuroides is more developed compared to the earlier hyaenodontid Cynohyaenodon cayluxi because of the lower positions of the rhinals and the larger number of sulci (or furrows). The cerebral hemispheres are separated from the cerebellum by a large gap and, in the front area of the brain, do not cover the olfactory bulbs. The neocortex is unremarkable and only in front of the piriform lobe. P. dasyuroides may have had five neopallium fissures, including a lateral sulcus, a suprasylvia preceded by a coronal or Y-shaped furrow, and a possible postsylvia. P. dasyuroides was previously thought to have had a primitive, simple, two-furrowed neocortex, which Lange-Badré concluded was incorrect because of the significant development of the neocortex itself and the lower position of the rhinals compared to Cynohyaenodon.

Therese Flink et al. in 2021 discussed how palaeontologists interpreted the endocast of P. dasyuroides, stating while Piveteau in 1935 and Lange-Badré in 1979 thought that the midbrain was exposed, Leonard Radinsky in 1977 suggested that instead, the neocortex's edge reached the cerebellum and olfactory bulbs. After a reexamination of the natural endocast, Flink et al. were inclined to agree with the latter view and stated that if there truly was any midbrain exposure, it would not have been well-pronounced in comparison to the other hyaenodonts Thinocyon velox or Proviverra typica.

The cerebellum is bulky compared to the front portion of the cerebrum because the former's cavity is not as large as the cerebral fossa and lack of coverage by the neocortex. The cerebellum appears higher in position than the cerebrum, and the cerebellar vermis strongly projects between the cerebellum's two hemispheres. The primary fissure of the cerebellum, located on the paleocerebellum-neocerebellum boundary, is in a backwards position, more so than certain "condylarths" such as Arctocyon and Pleuraspidotherium. There is no other known transverse furrow on the cerebellar vermis.

=== Dentition ===
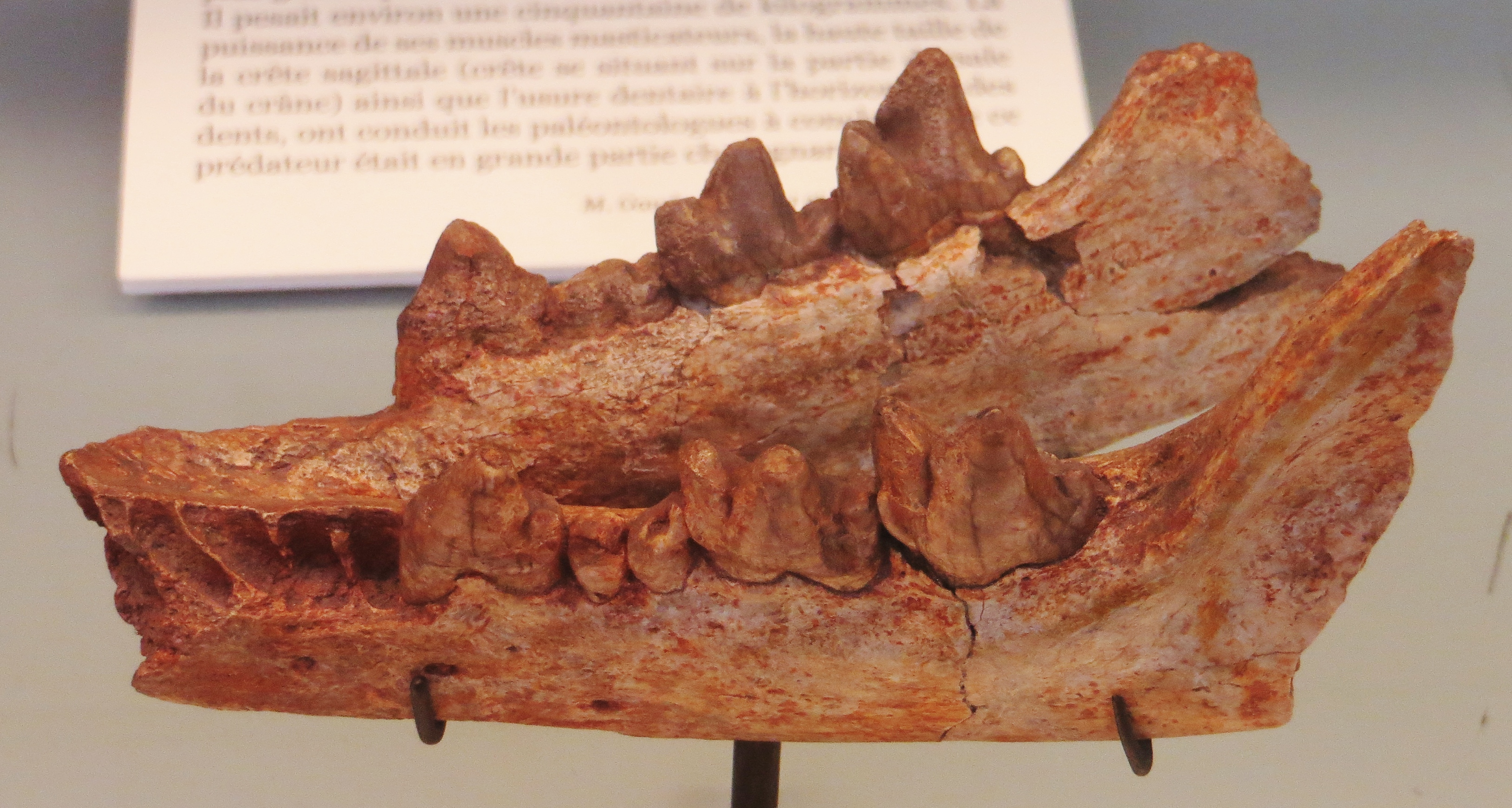
P. dasyuroides mandible

The subfamily Hyainailourinae within the family Hyainailouridae is diagnosed in the upper dentition as having high and secant-shaped paraconid cusps and cone-shaped metacone and paracone cusps on the M^{1}-M^{2} molars, a weak to absent P^{3} lingual cingulum, and a lack of any continuous lingual cingulum on P^{4}. For lower dentition, the M_{3} talonid cusp is reduced compared to those on M_{1}-M_{2}, and the protoconid and paraconid cusps are roughly equal in length in the molars.

Pterodon sensu lato is diagnosed in its dental differences with other hyainailourid genera. It differs from Metapterodon in being larger, the presence of an M_{3} talonid cusp, larger M_{1}-M_{2} tanolid cusps, narrower upper molars with shorter metastyle ridges, and an incomplete paracone-metacone cusp fusion. It differs also from Akhnatenavus in the talonid cusps of the molars being as wide as its trigonid cusps, roughly equal sizes of the protoconid and paraconid cusp sizes in the molars, unreduced premolar sizes, and a lack of diastemata for premolar spaces. Pterodon differs from Hyainailouros and Megistotherium by its smaller size and larger talonids on its lower molars. The diagnosis reflects the inclusion of other species included in Pterodon outside of the type species. P. dasyuroides differs from Kerberos by smaller-sized P^{1} and P_{1} premolars, a reduced number of upper incisors, a smaller protocone cusp on P^{3}, and smaller size. P. dasyuroides is also described as having a dental formula of 2.1.4.31.1.3–4.3. There is no evidence of any sexual dimorphism based on dentition.

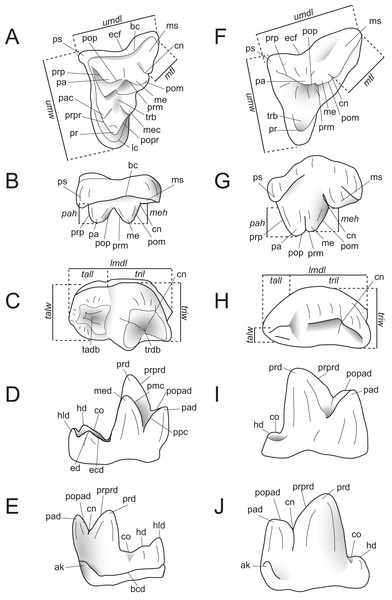
Upper left M^{2} (A-B) and lower left M_{3} (C-E) of Proviverra typica (A-E) compared to the upper left M^{2} (F-G) and lower left M_{3} (H-J) of Pterodon dasyuroides in different views

In the upper dentition, the two incisors, conical in shape, are unequal in size, the central incisor being twice or thrice as large as the lateral incisor. Their shapes suggest that they play a role in piercing through food rather than cutting them. The upper canines, although much larger than other teeth of the upper dental row, are not as strong as those of extant hyenas, as they are less robust in relation to the skull. P^{1} is small-sized, lacks any cingulate prominence except the anterior-lingual region where it connects with a ridge from the top of a cusp, and is formed by a conical cusp with a back half that is stretched into a lower edge. P^{2} is similar to P^{1} in shape; its hook shape in its main cusp is prominent, and the cingulum runs from the ridges over the entire lingual surface. P^{3} differs from the two other premolars by the top of the main cusp occupying a median position. The P^{4} has a lingual expansion of the median area of the paraconid cusp but is difficult to distinguish by itself from the P^{4} of Hyaenodon requieni. The first two upper molars have compressed and stretched metastyle ridges for a bladelike appearance that makes carnivorous diets unambiguous. The shapes of the two molars are of a right triangle with a front (anterior) base, and the first is smaller and more conservative in cuspid development than the second. M^{3} is wider than it is long and comes in two variants: it is either as wide as the two molars that precede it or is narrower than the two other molars and is stockier than the other variant.

In terms of the lower dentition, there are 8-9 teeth, meaning a reduction in dentition compared to primitive placental mammals. The known individual specimens from Quercy only show one pair of lower incisors, which are rarely preserved and are thick with flat wear. Similar to the upper canines, the lower canines are long, slender, and not very curved. The P^{1} is most often absent in development, although one specimen reveals one on the left side but not right of a mandible while another has them on both sides. It is a conical, short, and thick tooth with no distal stretching and two roots fused into one. P_{2}-P_{3} have low and stubby crowns while P_{4} is high and long, its height being 1.5 to 2 times that of P_{3}. The M_{1}, rarely adequately preserved, is subject to early and severe wear that levels the trigonid and talonid cusps, likely caused by frequent maximum-force occlusion with P^{4}. The M_{2} and M_{3}, despite the disappearance of the metaconid cusp and the receded talonid cusp, are thick and not very sharp. The protoconid cusp is slender and is the dominant cusp within the last two molars. M_{3} differs from M_{2} by being larger in size and the smaller, triangular-shaped talonid cusp.

=== Postcranial remains ===
P. dasyuroides is known by very few postcranial remains, which themselves currently have no known whereabouts. Blainville illustrated postcranial remains designated to "Taxotherium parisiense" in 1841, but only the ulna and fibula were referenced as belonging to P. dasyuroides by later palaeontologists like Léonard Ginsburg in 1980, leaving the taxonomic statuses of the humerus, carpals + metacarpals, astragalus, and calcaneus ambiguous, especially since Taxotherium was synonymized with Hyaenodon.

According to Ginsburg, the ulna of Hyainailouros sulzeri is arched and has a high plus well-developed olecranon (bony prominence on the elbow) and a long and strong diaphysis up to the distal end of the bone. The olecranon of H. sulzeri is long compared to those of carnivorans and it in a back position similar to artiodactyls. The antero-external tubercle is diminished while the antero-internal tubercle well-developed, a trait Ginsburg said was also found to be similar to a sketched ulna of P. dasyuroides by Blainville in 1841. The fibula of H. sulzeri was described as being thicker in comparison to carnivorans, with the diaphysis being twice as antero-posteriorly elongated in its distal area as its proximal area. The fibula's astragalus surface being wide and long is similar to that of P. dasyuroides as also depicted by Blainville.

=== Size ===
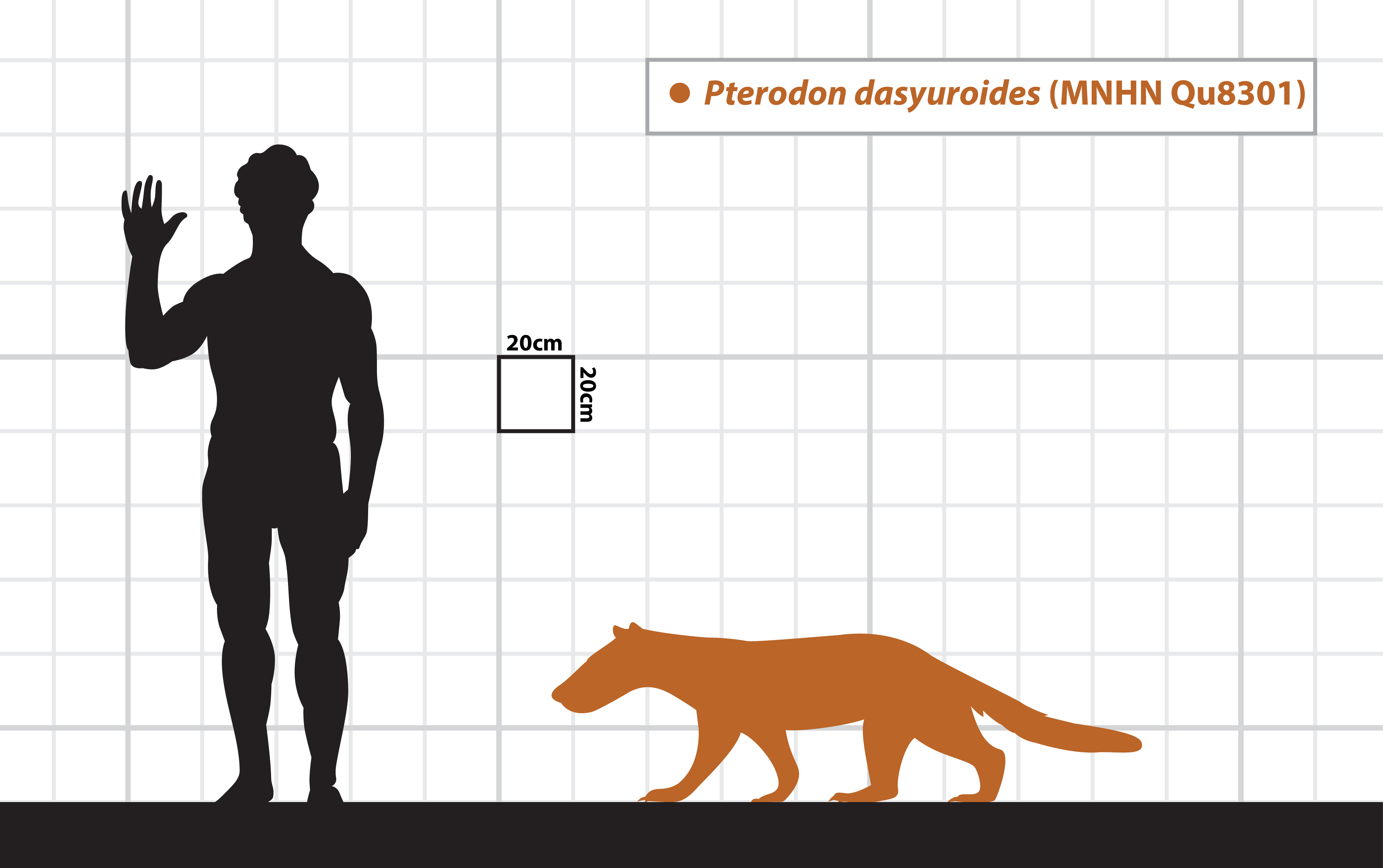
Size estimation of Pterodon dasyuroides

In 1977, Radinsky made early size estimates for hyaenodonts with known skeletons and no known complete which he based size estimates off of other "creodonts." He estimated that P. dasyuroides had an estimated body length range of 104 cm (41 in)-117 cm (46 in) and an estimated body weight range of 25.68 kg (56.6 lb)-35.149 kg (77.49 lb). However, due to the proportions of hyaenodonts being different from extant carnivorans, estimated values of them may not reflect their actual sizes.

Estimating the body sizes of hyaenodonts has proven difficult because they are extinct and have no modern analogues, plus dentally or cranially derived body sizes based on extant carnivorans are problematic since they have large crania in comparison to carnivorans, which produce unreasonably large estimated size values. As a result, hyaenodonts are measured more based on body mass and not estimated body size.

In 2015, Solé et al. estimated that based on the length of M_{1}-M_{3} being 52.35 mm (2.061 in), it may have weighed 51.56 kg (113.7 lb). Hyainailourids have been known for growing to typically larger sizes compared to other hyaenodonts, including the Paleogene and especially the Miocene. The estimated weight values for P. dasyuroides and other studied hyaenodonts remained unchanged in a 2020 paper by Solé et al.

== Palaeobiology ==
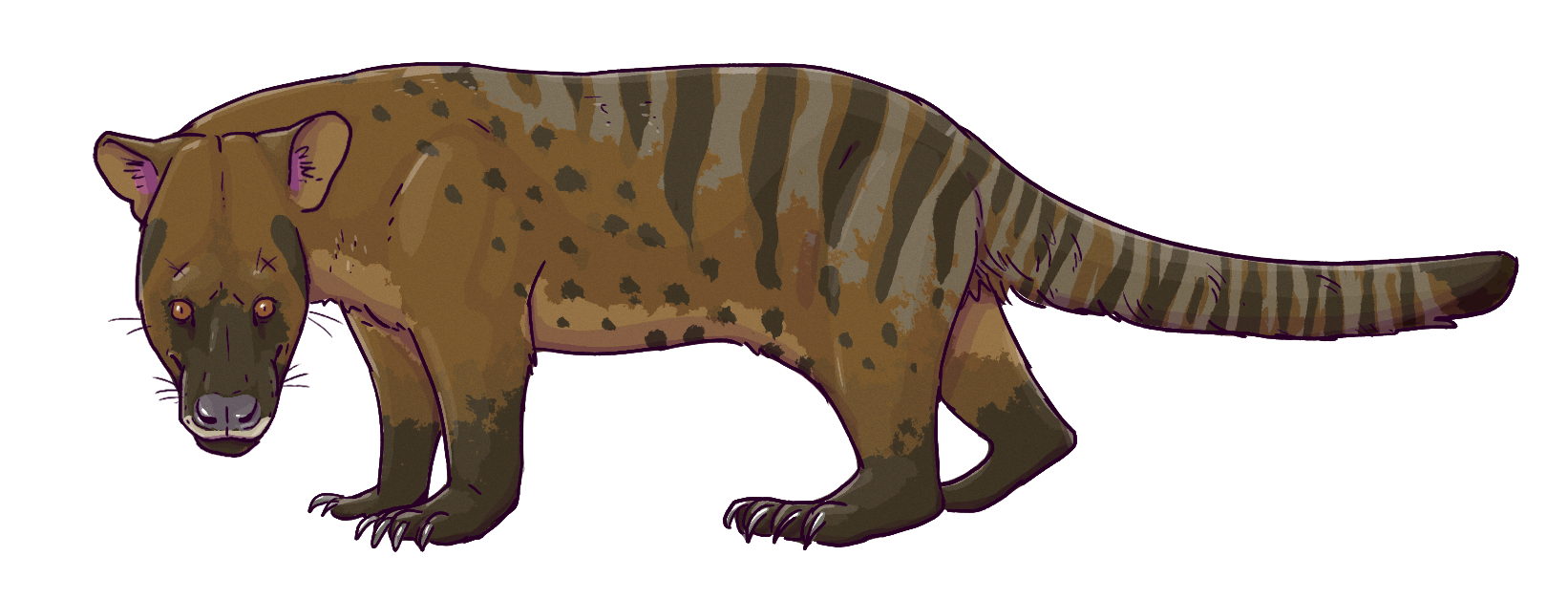
Reconstruction of P. dasyuroides based on known cranial material from the species and postcranial material from other hyainailourines

The order Hyaenodonta occupied a wide range of body sizes/body masses and ranged from mesocarnivorous to hypercarnivorous diets. The Hyainailourinae, which includes P. dasyuroides, was one hyaenodont lineage that gained hypercarnivorous adaptations given its various specific dental configurations. The diets of pan-carnivorans like P. dasyuroides were also inferred from Hunter-Schreger bands (HSB) on the tooth enamels of placental mammals. P. dasyuroides and some other hyaenodonts have only zigzag HSB patterns, patterns observed in extant carnivorans with high bite forces due to adaptations for bone-crushing since the zigzag HSBs render the enamel resistant to tensile stress. Because of its overall dentition morphology, P. dasyuroides is thought to have had adaptations to both meat cutting and bone crushing, the latter trait being shared with other later hyaenodonts.

Due to an overall lack of postcranial remains known for P. dasyuroides in the modern day, the locomotion of the Paleogene hyainailourid is unknown. In comparison, adequate postcranial remains are known for Hyainailouros sulzeri, Kerberos langebadreae, and Simbakubwa kutokaafrika, allowing for determinations of the locomotion methods of the hyainailourids. The elbow of H. sulzeri reveals incapability of flexible pronation-supination movements compared to typical cursorial mammals. The angulations and lengths of the fingers in relation to the metapodial bones, and the relation of the radius to the ulna suggest digitigrade movements of the forelimbs. The hindlimbs indicate similar results of digitigrade movement but, according to Ginsburg, have remnant traits of ancestral plantigrade movement. He theorized that it may have been semi-digitigrade overall with capabilities of leaping and occasional plantigrade movement. Similar traits of semi-digitigrady were also observed in S. kutokaafrika, with no capability of full digitigrade movement. Such adaptations of Miocene hyainailourines were likely the result of responses to more open environments.

In comparison, however, the Paleogene hyainailourid Kerberos shows plantigrade stances and terrestrial locomotion based on known postcranial evidence. The locomotion method made it differ from the more cursorial hyaenodontid Hyaenodon as well as hyaenids and borophagine canids, which all also displayed degrees of ossiphageous (bone-crushing) adaptations. The locomotion method of Kerberos suggests that plantigrady was a primitive trait of the order Hyaenodonta, including the hyainailourids, while digitigrady/semi-digitigrady adaptations were derived traits within the order. Kerberos is thought to have been an active predator and opportunistic scavenger based on its fossil evidence.

== Palaeoecology ==
=== Early pre–Grande Coupure Europe ===
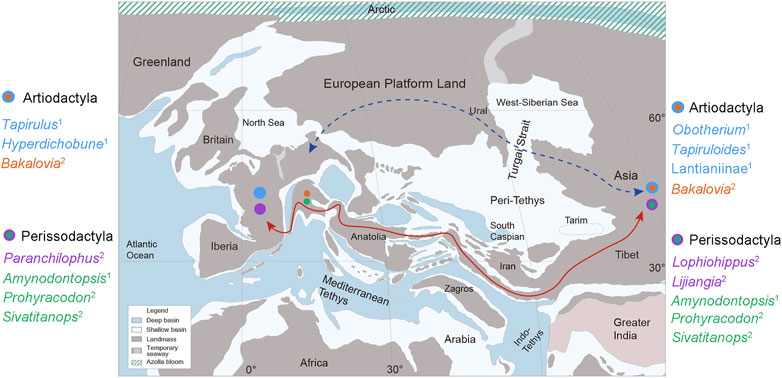
Palaeogeography of Europe and Asia during the middle Eocene with possible artiodactyl and perissodactyl dispersal routes.

For much of the Eocene, the world's environments were shaped by warm and humid climates, with subtropical to tropical closed forests being the dominant habitats. Multiple carnivorous mammal groups arose in Europe, Asia, Afro-Arabia, and North America, namely mesonychians, hyaenodonts, oxyaenids, and carnivoramorphs, dispersing between the continents. Several other prominent mammal orders arose within the continents by the early Eocene including the Perissodactyla, Artiodactyla, and Primates, diversifying rapidly and developing dentitions specialized for folivory. The omnivorous forms mostly either switched to folivorous diets or went extinct by the middle Eocene (47 to 37 Ma) along with the archaic "condylarths".

Land-based connections to the north of the developing Atlantic Ocean were interrupted around 53 Ma, meaning that North America and Greenland were no longer well-connected to western Europe. From the early Eocene up until the Grande Coupure extinction event (56 Ma to 33.9 Ma), the western Eurasian continent was separated into three landmasses, the former two of which were isolated by seaways: western Europe (an archipelago), Balkanatolia, and eastern Eurasia (Balkanatolia was in between the Paratethys Sea of the north and the Neotethys Ocean of the south). The Holarctic mammalian faunas of western Europe were therefore mostly isolated from other continents including Greenland, Africa, and eastern Eurasia, allowing for endemism to occur within western Europe. The European mammals of the late Eocene (MP17 to MP20) were mostly descendants of endemic middle Eocene groups as a result.

By MP16, a faunal turnover event occurred that marked the extinctions of lophiodonts, European tapiroids, and all crocodylomorphs except for the alligatoroid Diplocynodon. The causes of the faunal turnover have been attributed to a shift from humid and highly tropical environments to drier and more temperate forests with open areas and more abrasive vegetation. The surviving herbivorous faunas shifted their dentitions and dietary strategies accordingly to adapt to abrasive and seasonal vegetation. The environments were still subhumid and full of subtropical evergreen forests, however. The Palaeotheriidae was the sole remaining European perissodactyl group, and frugivorous-folivorous or purely folivorous artiodactyls became the dominant group in western Europe.

During and after the faunal turnover event in western Europe, the Hyainailourinae made its first appearance in the continent by MP16 while the Hyaenodontinae appeared by MP17a and the carnivoran family Amphicyonidae by MP18. Hyaenodonts remained the dominant carnivorous mammal group compared to the carnivoraforms. In the environments, the body masses of hyaenodonts tended to increase over time, although the rate was slower to those in North America, meaning that they were still favorable enough they were able to achieve large sizes. The large sizes of hyaenodonts had only been previously reached in western Europe by mesonychids in the early Eocene. In comparison, the presences of large flightless birds and crocodyloforms in the early-middle Eocene did not appear to have influenced hyaenodont body size.

=== Late Eocene ===
P. dasyuroides first appears in the western European fossil record by MP18, with a significant ghost lineage of probably Afro-Arabian origins that makes its exact evolutionary history unknown. It has no known appearance in eastern Europe. The range of P. dasyuroides from MP18 to MP20 likely overlapped with other hyaenodonts (Hyaenodontinae, Hyainailourinae, and Proviverrinae) such as Hyaenodon, Cynohyaenodon, Allopterodon, Parapterodon, Paenoxyaenoides, and Quercytherium. Several carnivoraforms likely overlapped with its range as well, such as miacids (Paramiacis, Quercygale, Simamphicyon), and the amphicyonid Cynodictis (several species are assigned to the genus that are pending reassessment, however).

P. dasyuroides coexisted with a wide diversity of mammals, including endemic artiodactyls (Anoplotheriidae, Xiphodontidae, Choeropotamidae (recently determined to be polyphyletic, however), Cebochoeridae, Amphimerycidae, Mixtotheriidae, and Cainotheriidae), non-endemic artiodactyls (Dichobunidae, Tapirulidae, and Anthracotheriidae), perissodactyls (Palaeotheriidae), leptictidans (Pseudorhyncocyonidae), primates (Adapoidea and Omomyoidea), eulipotyphlans (Nyctitheriidae), chiropterans, herpetotheriid marsupials, and endemic rodents (Pseudosciuridae, Theridomyidae, and Gliridae). The alligatoroid Diplocynodon, present only in Europe since the upper Paleocene, coexisted with pre-Grande Coupure faunas as well, likely consuming insects, fish, frogs, and eggs due to prey partitioning previously with other crocodylomorphs that had since died out by the late Eocene. In addition to snakes, frogs, and salamandrids, rich assemblage of lizards are known in western Europe as well from MP16-MP20, representing the Iguanidae, Lacertidae, Gekkonidae, Agamidae, Scincidae, Helodermatidae, and Varanoidea, most of which were able to thrive in the warm temperatures of western Europe.

The MP19 locality of Escamps, for instance, indicates that P. dasyuroides coexisted with the herpetotheriids Peratherium and Amphiperatherium, pseudorhyncocyonid Pseudorhyncocyon, bats (Hipposideros, Vaylatsia, Vespertiliavus, Stehlinia), primates (Microchoerus, Palaeolemur), rodents (Blainvillimys, Theridomys, Plesiarctomys, Glamys), hyaenodont Hyaenodon, amphicyonid Cynodictis, palaeotheres Palaeotherium and Plagiolophus, dichobunid Dichobune, anoplotheriids Anoplotherium and Diplobune, cainothere Paroxacron and Oxacron, xiphodonts (Xiphodon, Dichodon, Haplomeryx), and amphimerycid Amphimeryx.

== Extinction ==
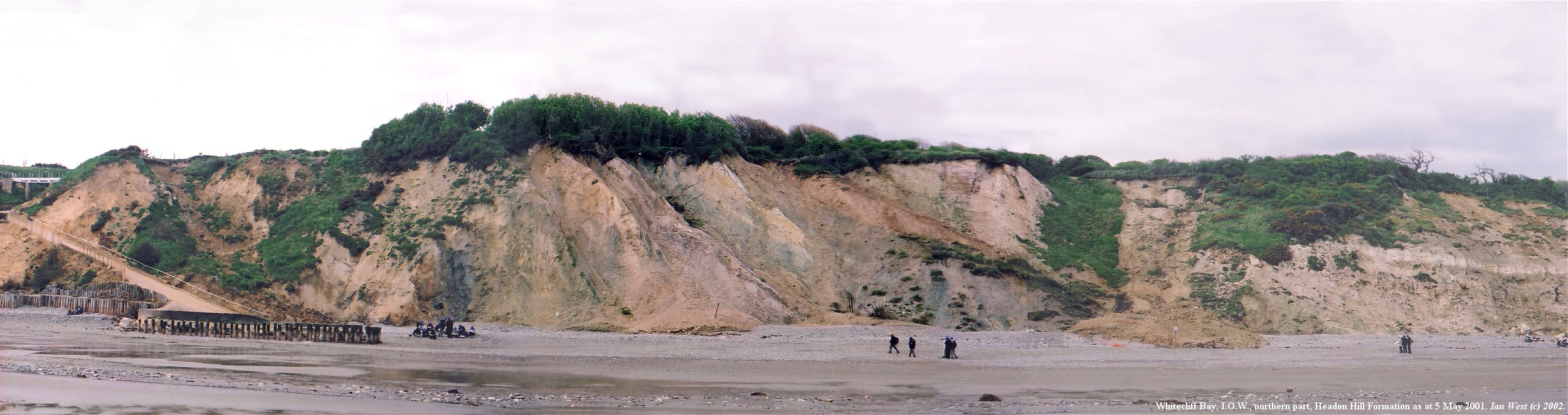
A panorama of the Headon Hill Formation in the Isle of Wight, from which Anoplotherium material has been collected. The stratigraphy of it and the Bouldnor Formation led to better understandings of faunal chronologies from the Late Eocene up to the Grande Coupure.

The Grande Coupure extinction and faunal turnover event of western Europe, dating back to the latest Eocene to earliest Oligocene (MP20-MP21), is one of the largest and most abrupt faunal events in the Cenozoic record, which is coincident with climate forcing events of cooler and more seasonal climates. The result of the event was a 60% extinction rate of western European mammalian lineages while Asian faunal immigrants replaced them. The Grande Coupure is often marked by palaeontologists as part of the Eocene-Oligocene boundary as a result at 33.9 Ma, although some estimate that the event began 33.6-33.4 Ma. The event correlates directly with or after the Eocene-Oligocene transition, an abrupt shift from a greenhouse world characterizing much of the Paleogene to a coolhouse/icehouse world of the early Oligocene onwards. The massive drop in temperatures stems from the first major expansion of the Antarctic ice sheets that caused drastic pCO_{2} decreases and an estimated drop of ~70 m (230 ft) in sea level.

The seaway dynamics separating western Europe from other landmasses to strong extents but allowing for some levels of dispersals prior to the Grande Coupure are complicated and contentious, but many palaeontologists agreed that glaciation and the resulting drops in sea level played major roles in the drying of the seaways previously acting as major barriers to eastern migrants from Balkanatolia and western Europe. The Turgai Strait is often proposed as the main European seaway barrier prior to the Grande Coupure, but some researchers challenged this perception recently, arguing that it completely receded already 37 Ma, long before the Eocene-Oligocene transition. Licht et al. (2022) suggested that the Grande Coupure could have possibly been synchronous with the Oi-1 glaciation (33.5 Ma), which records a decline in atmospheric CO_{2}, boosting the Antarctic glaciation that already started by the Eocene-Oligocene transition. The Oi-1 glaciation, similar to the first glaciation event, caused large drops in sea level and pushed the global climate towards a coolhouse/icehouse environment.

The Grande Coupure event also marked a large faunal turnover marking the arrivals of later anthracotheres, entelodonts, ruminants (Gelocidae, Lophiomerycidae), rhinocerotoids (Rhinocerotidae, Amynodontidae, Eggysodontidae), carnivorans (later Amphicyonidae, Amphicynodontidae, Nimravidae, and Ursidae), eastern Eurasian rodents (Eomyidae, Cricetidae, and Castoridae), and eulipotyphlans (Erinaceidae).

The Eocene-Oligocene transition of western Europe, as a result of the global climatic conditions, is marked by a transition from tropical and subtropical forests to more open, temperate or mixed deciduous habitats with adaptations to increased seasonality. As a result, a large majority of mammals endemic to Europe went extinct, including entire artiodactyl families. Notably, the last known occurrence of P. dasyuroides is in the locality of Saint-Capraise-d'Eymet, which dates to MP20. MP20 also marks the last known appearance of Hyaenodon requieni while Hyaenodon gervaisi and Cynodictis extended beyond the extinction event.

The extinction of Pterodon and survival of Hyaenodon by the Grande Coupure extinction event are notable but have no clear explanation available. The extinction causes have been attributed to climate deterioration (subsequent losses of suitable habitats and food), competition with dispersing carnivorans, or some combination of the two. However, carnivorans playing a role in its extinction has been questioned as there’s no strong evidence of carnivorans competitively displacing hyaenodonts. Additionally, the newcomers didn’t appear in Western Europe until the MP21, while hyainailourines were last record in MP19-20.
