= Boualitomus =

Boualitomus Temporal range: early Ypresian? (early Eocene)

Scientific classification
- Kingdom: Animalia
- Phylum: Chordata
- Class: Mammalia
- Order: †Hyaenodonta
- Genus: †Boualitomus; Gheerbrant et al., 2006

Type species
- †Boualitomus marocanensis Gheerbrant et al., 2006

Extinct genus of mammals

Boualitomus ("Ouled Bou Ali blade") is an extinct genus of basal hyaenodont from the early Eocene of Morocco. It is known from a single species, Boualitomus marocanensis, represented by a partial right dentary. This singular fossil was found in the Ouled Abdoun Basin, most likely within the Ypresian-age "bed I" of the Grand Daoui area.

Boualitomus is one of several very early-diverging hyaenodonts from Morocco, alongside the even older Tinerhodon and Lahimia. Early, unspecialized hyaenodonts like Boualitomus are sometimes classified in the subfamily "Proviverrinae", though some studies prefer a more restricted use of that subfamily. A 2009 study grouped Boualitomus, Lahimia, and Koholia (a slightly younger genus from Algeria) into the clade Koholiinae.

== Description ==
The lower jaw of Boualitomus preserves a canine, three premolars (p2-p4), and all three molars (m1-m3). Like Lahimia, the dentary is characteristically shortened, leading to the loss of the first premolar (p1). The teeth have tall and sharply pointed cusps, indicating a carnivorous diet, though they are not fully modified into blade-like carnassials. The premolars are narrow, with a large triangular protoconid bearing sharp cutting ridges. There are small gaps between the robust canine and each premolar. The largest and most complex premolar is p4, which has a few minor cusps alongside the protoconid: a paraconid at the front and a protostylid and hypoconid at the back, plus indistinct remnants. By comparison, Tinerhodon has a broader p4 with more distinct additional cusps.

Like other basal hyaenodonts, m2 and m3 are equal in size, with m1 slightly smaller. The protoconid is by far the tallest cusp in each molar, while the paraconid and metaconid are also fairly tall. In later hyaenodonts, the metaconid shrinks and the paraconid shifts in front of the protoconid to form a narrower carnassial molar. Lahimia also has a smaller metaconid, though its paraconid is shifted in the opposite direction. Neither specialization is present in Boualitomus. The talonid (rear portion of each molar) is narrow, with weakly developed cusps (unlike Tinerhodon).
