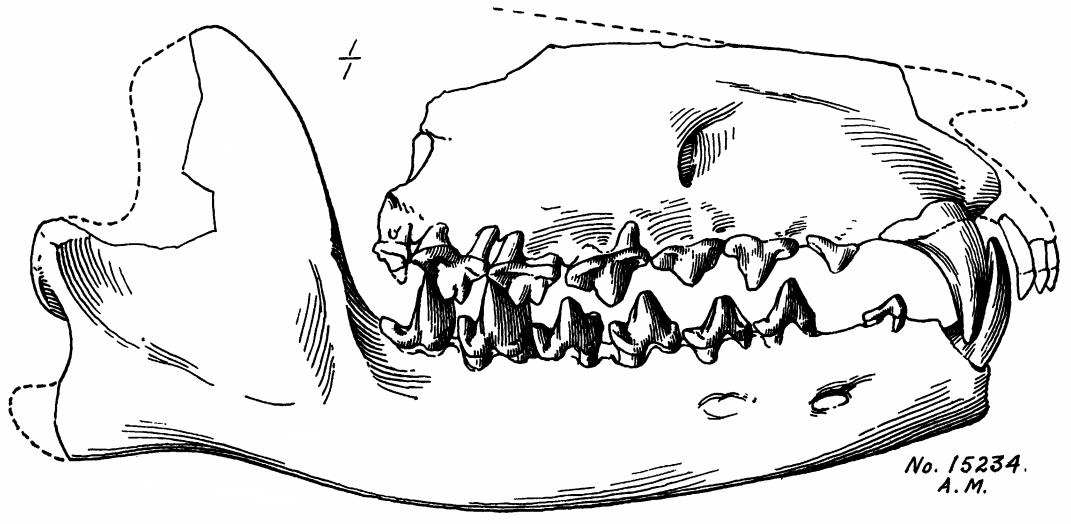
- parts of upper and lower jaws of Pyrocyon strenuus

Scientific classification
- Kingdom: Animalia
- Phylum: Chordata
- Class: Mammalia
- Infraclass: Placentalia
- Order: †Hyaenodonta
- Genus: †Pyrocyon; Gingerich & Deustch, 1989

Type species
- †Pyrocyon dioctetus Gingerich & Deustch, 1989

Species
- †P. dioctetus (Gingerich & Deustch, 1989); †P. strenuus (Cope, 1875)

Synonyms
- synonyms of genus: Pirocyon (Lavrov, 1999); synonyms of species: P. strenuus: Prototomus strenuus (Cope, 1875); Stypolophus aculeatus (Cope, 1881); Stypolophus hians (Cope, 1877); Stypolophus strenuus (Cope, 1880); Stypolophus whiteae (Cope, 1882); Stypolophus whitiae (Cope, 1882); Sinopa aculeata (Matthew, 1899); Sinopa hians (Matthew, 1901); Sinopa strenua (Matthew, 1899); Sinopa strenuus (Matthew, 1901); Sinopa whitiae (Cope, 1882); Tritemnodon hians (Van Valen, 1965); Tritemnodon strenua (Van Valen, 1965); Tritemnodon strenuus (Van Valen, 1965); Tritemnodon whitiae (Matthew, 1906)

= Pyrocyon =

Pyrocyon Temporal range: 55.8–50.3 Ma Wasatchian

Extinct genus of dog-like animals

Pyrocyon ("fire dog") is an extinct genus of small carnivorous placental mammals from extinct order Hyaenodonta, that lived in North America during the early Eocene. Fossils of Pyrocyon have been found in Wyoming and Colorado. Weight of Pyrocyon dioctetus has been estimated at around 2.6 kilograms.
