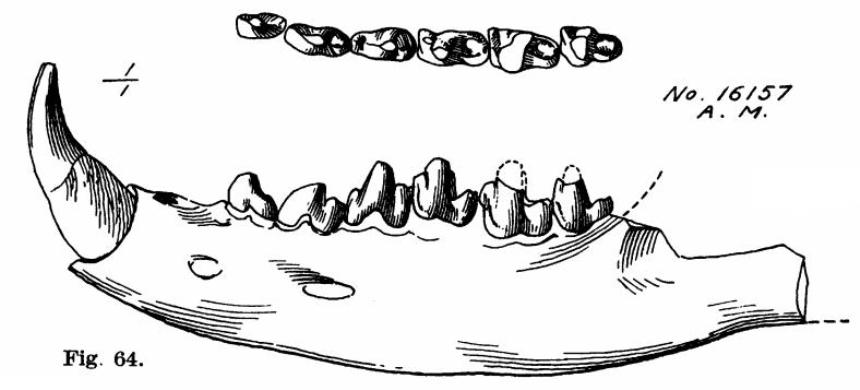
- lower jaw of Galecyon mordax

Scientific classification
- Kingdom: Animalia
- Phylum: Chordata
- Class: Mammalia
- Order: †Hyaenodonta
- Genus: †Galecyon; Gingerich & Deutsch, 1989

Type species
- †Galecyon mordax Matthew & Granger, 1915

Species
- †G. chronius (Zack, 2011); †G. gallus (Solé, 2013); †G. mordax (Matthew & Granger, 1915); †G. morloi (Smith & Smith, 2001); †G. peregrinus (Zack, 2011)

Synonyms
- synonyms of genus: Gallecyon (Lavrov, 1999); synonyms of species: G. mordax: Paeneprolimnocyon mordax (Delson, 1971); Prototomus mordax (Van Valen, 1965); Sinopa mordax (Matthew & Granger, 1915)

= Galecyon =

Galecyon Temporal range: 56.0–50.3 Ma early Eocene

Extinct genus of mammals

Galecyon ("polecat-like dog") is an extinct genus of placental mammals from extinct order Hyaenodonta, that lived in Europe and North America (found in the Clarks Fork and Powder River basins of Wyoming) during the early Eocene.

== Description ==
Galecyon had robust canines and short, deep jaws. Prior to 2015, little was known about its post-cranial skeleton. However, following the discovery of more complete fossils, it is now known to have been a primarily terrestrial animal weighing between 5.2 and 7.9 kg (11 and 17 lb), lacking the adaptations for climbing found in some of its close relatives.
