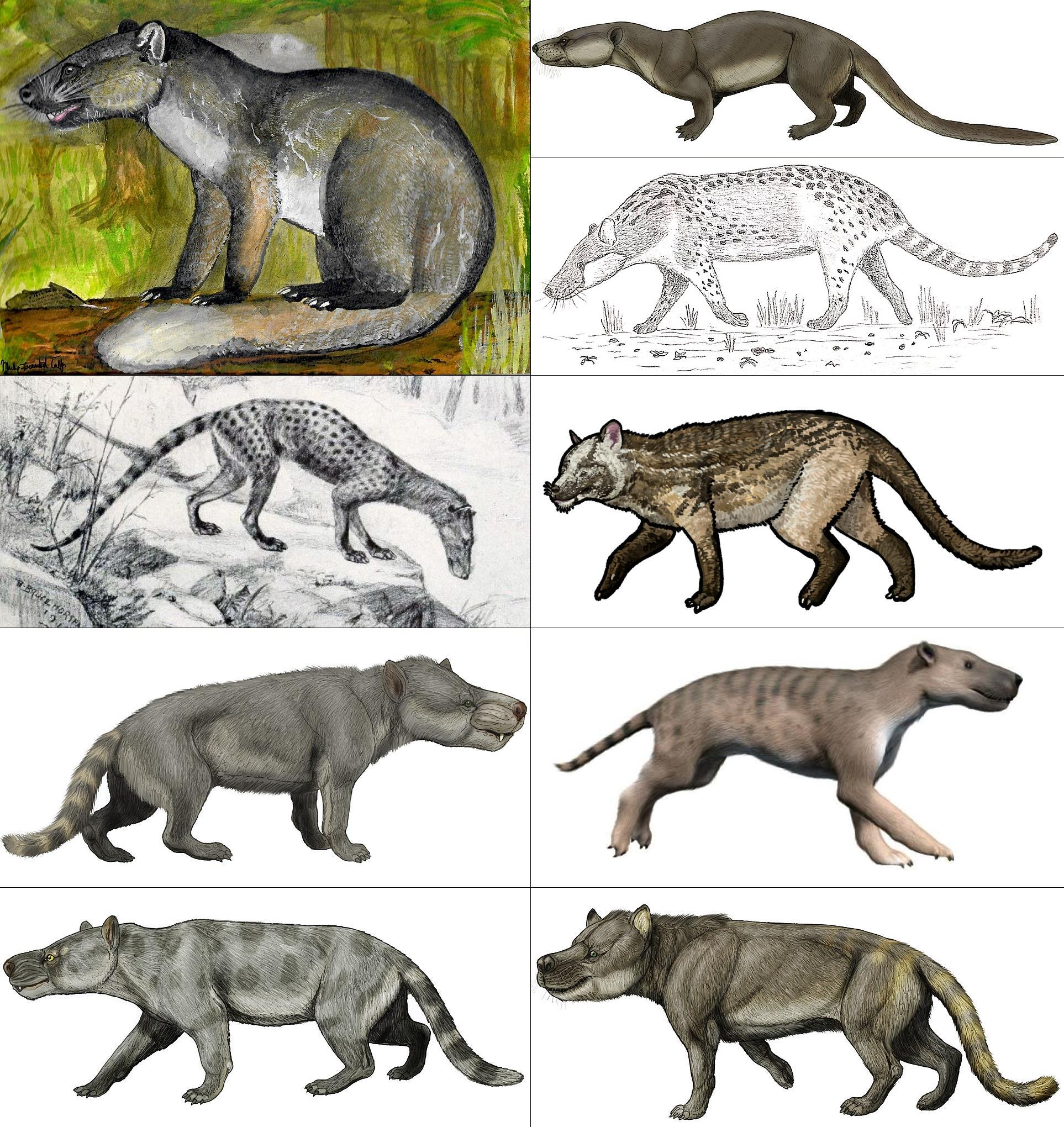
- Species from the order Hyaenodonta

Scientific classification
- Kingdom: Animalia
- Phylum: Chordata
- Class: Mammalia
- Mirorder: Ferae
- Clade: Pan-Carnivora
- Order: †Hyaenodonta; Van Valen, 1967

Subgroups
- [see classification]

Synonyms
- Hyaenodontida (Solé, 2010); Hyaenodontidae (Leidy, 1869); Proviverroidea (Morlo, 2009)

= Hyaenodonta =

Hyaenodonta Temporal range: Middle Paleocene to Late Miocene 61.6–7.5 Ma (Suspected Late Cretaceous origin, but unconfirmed by fossils yet)

Extinct order of mammals

Hyaenodonta ("hyena teeth") is an extinct order of carnivorous placental mammals of clade Pan-Carnivora from mirorder Ferae. Hyaenodonts were important mammalian predators that are believed to have arose either in the Late Cretaceous or Early Paleocene within Europe or North America, and persisted well into the Late Miocene. Hyaenodonts were found across Africa, Eurasia, and North America throughout the Cenozoic and occupied a variety of ecosystems, from forests to coastlines. They displayed a range in body size from the size of small weasels to rhinoceros-sized genera such as Megistotherium, as well as a diversity in locomotion ranging from scansorial to terrestrial locomotion.

The order currently consists of three superfamilies, Hyaenodontoidea, Hyainailouroidea, and Limnocyonoidea, in addition to smaller groups such as the Galecyon clade. The hyaenodontoids consisted of Hyaenodontidae and Proviverrinae, the hyainailouroids consisted of Hyainailouridae, Prionogalidae, and Teratodontidae, and with the limnocyonoids consisted of Limnocyoninae, Sinopinae, and Arfiinae. Hyaenodonts reached its diversification peak during the Middle-Late Eocene, before seeing a significant decline in diversity following the Eocene-Oligocene extinction event. In Afro-Arabia and Europe, they saw a recovery in diversity following the extinction event before seeing a terminal decline during the Late Oligocene and Early Miocene respectively. The last hyaenodont would go extinct 7.5 Ma.

The extinction of the order has been debated by experts, many experts argued that their extinction was the result of competition with carnivorans. But over the recent years, many experts have questioned that hypothesis and argued their decline and extinction in most of their range was due to climatic changes.

== Classification and phylogeny ==
=== History of taxonomy ===
Hyaenodonts were considerably more widespread and successful than the oxyaenids, the other clade of mammals originally classified along with the hyaenodonts as part of Creodonta. In 2015 phylogenetic analysis of Paleogene mammals, by Halliday et al., the monophyly of Creodonta was supported and was placed in the clade Ferae, closer to Pholidota than to Carnivora. However, most experts consider Creodonta to be a polyphyletic order as it contains two unrelated clades. Most experts have now recovered Hyaenodonta and Oxyaenodonta as distinct orders within Pan-Carnivora, with Altacreodus being a sister taxon to the order. Recent phylogenetic modeling suggests hyaenodonts were sister group to the Oxyaenodonta-Carnivoraformes clade.

=== Classification ===
Hyaenodonta currently consists of three superfamilies, Hyaenodontoidea, Hyainailouroidea, and Limnocyonoidea. The hyaenodontoids consisted of Hyaenodontidae and Proviverrinae, the hyainailouroids consisted of Hyainailouridae, Prionogalidae, and Teratodontidae, and with the limnocyonoids consisted of Limnocyoninae, Sinopinae, and Arfiinae. It also contained groups outside of the superfamilies such as the Galecyon clade and Indohyaenodontinae. Hyainailourines were historically considered to be a subfamily within Hyaenodontidae, however Sole et al. (2015) proposed the clade Hyainailouridae, uniting the Hyainailourinae and Apterodontinae under the family.

- Order Hyaenodonta Van Valen, 1967
  - Superfamily Limnocyonoidea Vankelst, 2024
    - Clade Arfiinae Solé, 2014
    - Clade Limnocyoninae Wortman, 1902
    - Clade Sinopinae Solé, 2013
  - Superfamily Hyaenodontoidea Leidy, 1869
    - Family Hyaenodontidae Leidy, 1869
    - Clade Proviverrinae Schlosser, 1886
  - Unranked clade Afro-Arabia
    - Genus Boualitomus Gheerbrant et al., 2006
    - Genus Koholia Crochet, 1988
    - Genus Lahimia Solé, 2009
    - Subfamily Indohyaenodontinae Solé, 2013
    - Superfamily Hyainailouroidea Borths, 2016
      - Genus Furodon Solé, 2013
      - Family Hyainailouridae Pilgrim, 1932
      - Family Prionogalidae Morales, 2008
      - Family Teratodontidae Savage, 1965
  - Incertae sedis families and subfamilies:
    - Wyolestidae Gingerich, 1981
  - Incertae sedis genera:
    - Eoproviverra Solé, 2014
    - Galecyon Gingerich & Deutsch, 1989
    - Gazinocyon Polly, 1996
    - Glibzegdouia Crochet, 2001
    - Kyawdawia Egi, 2005
    - Paratritemnodon Ranga Rao, 1973
    - Parvavorodon Solé, 2013
    - Pyrocyon Gingerich & Deustch, 1989
    - Tinerhodon Gheerbrant, 1995
    - Tritemnodon Matthew, 1906
  - Ichnotaxa of Hyaenodonta:
    - Ichnogenus: †Creodontipus Santamaria, 1989
    - Ichnogenus: †Dischidodacylus Sarjeant & Wilson, 1988
    - Ichnogenus: †Sarcotherichnus Demathieu, 1984
    - Ichnofamily: †Sarjeantipodidae McCrea, Pemberton & Currie, 2004
      - Ichnogenus: †Hyaenodontipus Ellenberger, 1980
      - Ichnogenus: †Quiritipes Sarjeant, 2002
      - Ichnogenus: †Sarjeantipes McCrea, Pemberton & Currie, 2004

=== Phylogeny ===
Phylogeny from Dubied et al. (2019) and Al-Ashqar et al. (2025) showing differences in more recent publications

Dubied et al. (2019)

- - Maelestes
  - - - Altacreodus
      - Tinerhodon
    - - Eoproviverra
      - - - - Prototomus minimus
            - - Prototomus phobos
              - Sinopa
          - - Arfia
            - Limnocyoninae
        - - - - - Boualitomus
                - Lahimia
              - - Galecyon
                - - Gazinocyon
                  - Pyrocyon
            - - - Koholia
                - Tritemnodon
              - - - Glibzegdouia
                  - Indoyaenodon
                - Hyainailouroidea
                  - Hyainailouridae
                    - Hyainailourinae
                    - Apterodontinae
                  - Teratodontinae
          - Hyaenodontoidea
            - Proviverrinae
            - Hyaenodontidae
              - - Boritia
                - - Cynohyaenodon trux
                  - - Cynohyaenodon cayluxi
                    - - Paracynohyaenodon
                      - Quercytherium
              - - - Leonhardtina
                  - Preregidens
                - - Eurotherium
                  - - Matthodon
                    - - Oxyaenoides
                      - - - Thereutherium
                          - Prionogalidae
                        - Hyaenodontinae

Al-Ashqar et al. (2025)

- - Maelestes
  - - Altacreodus
    - Hyaenodonta
      - - Eoproviverra
        - Tinerhodon
      - - - - Prototomus minimus
            - - Prototomus phobos
              - Sinopa
          - - Arfia
            - Limnocyoninae
        - - Hyaenodontoidea
          - - - Galecyon
              - - Gazinocyon
                - Pyrocyon
            - - - Boualitomus
                - - Lahimia
                  - - Parvavorodon
                    - gen. nov.
              - - Indohyaenodon
                - - - - Kyawdawia
                      - Paratritemnodon
                    - - Furodon
                      - - Glibzegdouia
                        - Teratodontinae
                  - - Tritemnodon
                    - - Kohlia
                      - - Apterodontinae
                        - Hyainailourinae

=== Evolution ===
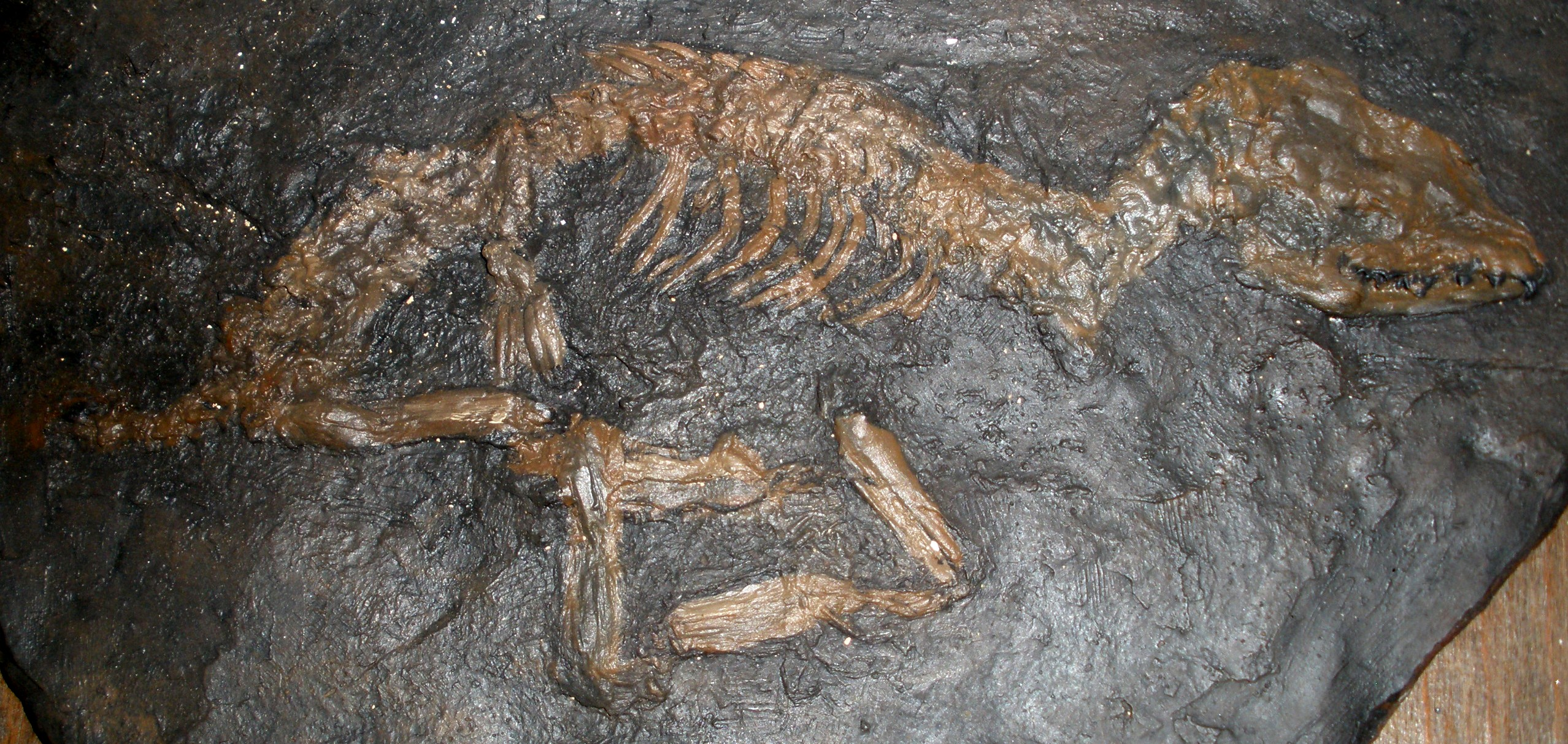
Skeleton of Lesmesodon edingeri, a weasel-sized hyaenodont

When the order arose exactly has changed over the years, Solé and Smith (2013) suggested hyaenodonts arose in the Late Paleocene roughly 58 Ma. Solé et al. (2009), as well as Borths and Stevens (2019), suggested an Early Paleocene origin for the order. However, majority of phylogenetic modeling over the recent years supported a Late Cretaceous origin for the order.

The biogeographic origin of the group has also been hotly debated by experts. Solé et al. (2009) suggested an African origin for the order as the known oldest hyaenodonts were recovered there, in additional to the diversity of hyaenodonts within the Ouarzazate basin. Bayesian analysis by various studies had found strong evidence of hyaenodonts originating from Europe. Borths et al. (2016) noted while European and North America origins were problematic due to hyaneodonts not being recorded before the Paleocene-Eocene boundary, European Paleocene records were poor unlike North America. They also noted Afro-Arabian origins for the order have never been tested using phylogenetic analysis and was based on the assumption that Lahimia was a basal hyaenodont although more recent analysis suggest it wasn't a basal hyaenodont. On the other hand, Bayesian analysis by Al-Ashqar et al. (2025) found stronger evidence of a North American origin than a European origin.

From Europe, hyaenodonts would have dispersed into Africa and from there dispersed into India. The oldest known hyaenodonts were Lahimia and Tinerhodon from the middle Paleocene of Morocco. Afterwards, hyaenodonts dispersed into Asia from either Europe or India, and dispersed into North America from either Europe or Asia within the Paleocene-Eocene boundary. Proviverrines experience a radiation in diversity during the Early Eocene, due to the lack of competition and the Early Eocene Climatic Optimum. In Africa, hyaenodonts saw an increase in subfamilial richness after the end of the Early Eocene Climatic Optimum. During the Middle Eocene, hyaenodonts, along with carnivorans, replaced oxyaenids, mesonychians, and miacoids in North America and Europe. Within the latter, the extinction of European mesonychids and oxyaenids resulted in the diversification of hyaenodonts, as well as an increase in body size. Within the Lutetian-Bartonian boundary, hyainailourines dispersed into Europe and North America. For most of the Paleogene, hyaenodonts were the dominant group of mammalian carnivores in Africa and Europe.

The order saw a massive decline globally during the Eocene-Oligocene extinction event. Following the boundary event, hyaenodonts experienced a rebound in diversity in Europe and Afro-Arabia. During the Early Miocene, the formation of the Gomphotherium land bridge saw the dispersal of Afro-Arabian hyaenodonts into Eurasia.

== Anatomy ==
=== Size ===
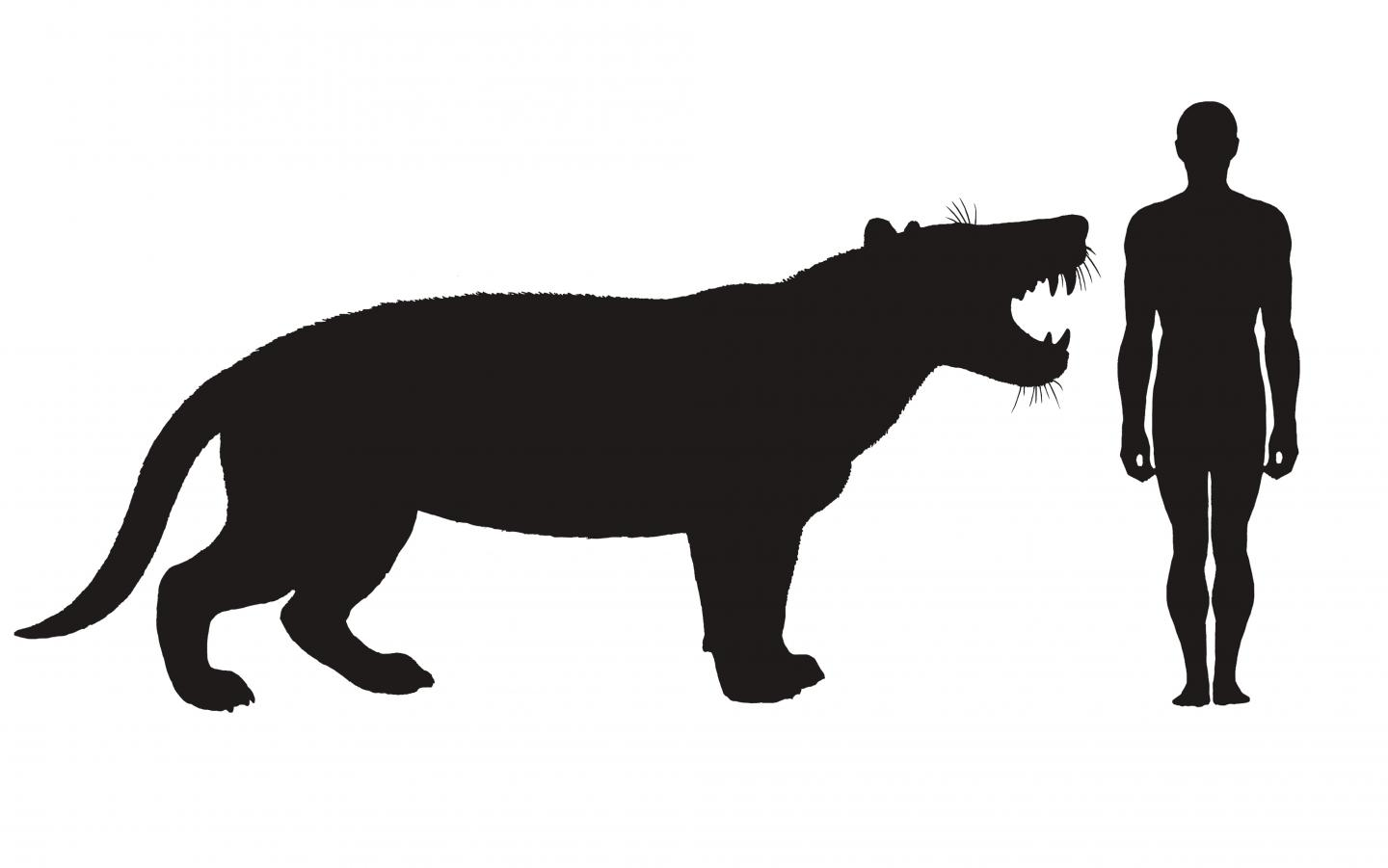
Size comparison of Simbakubwa kutokaafrika and a human

They generally ranged in size from 30–140 cm (1 ft 0 in – 4 ft 7 in) at the shoulder, with most hyaenodonts weighing within the 5–15 kg (11–33 lb) range, equivalent to a mid-sized dog. However, hyaenodonts have been known to reach larger or smaller sizes. Thinocyon was estimated to have weighed 1 kg (2.2 lb), Hyaenodon filholi was also a small hyaenodont weighing 2 kg (4.4 lb).

Hyaenodon horridus was one of the largest North American species, with limb regressions suggesting the adults weighed 41.42 kg (91 lb 5 oz) on average, with the largest adults weighing no more than 60 kg (130 lb). Hyaenodon megaloides was the largest North American Hyaenodon species being three times heavier than Hyaenodon horridus, weighing 30–120 kg (66–265 lb). However, Van Valkenburgh (1994) suggested this species may have weighed 165 kg (364 lb), making it about the size of a lion. The hyainailourine Simbakubwa kutokaafrika may have weighed up to 1,500 kg (3,300 lb), with Megistotherium estimated to have reached an even larger size of 1,794–3,002 kg (3,955–6,618 lb). However estimate is suspect due to being based on skull-body size ratios derived from felids, which have much smaller skulls for their body size. Additionally, it was estimated that the maximum size a terrestrial mammalian carnivores could reach was 1,100 kg (2,400 lb), further suggesting the higher body mass estimates for Megistotherium was unlikely.

Other large hyaenodonts include Hyainailouros, Hyaenodon gigas, and Hyaenodon mongoliensis (two of the largest species of the genus, Hyaenodon), all three taxa had a skull length of 60 cm (2.0 ft).

=== Skull and dentition ===
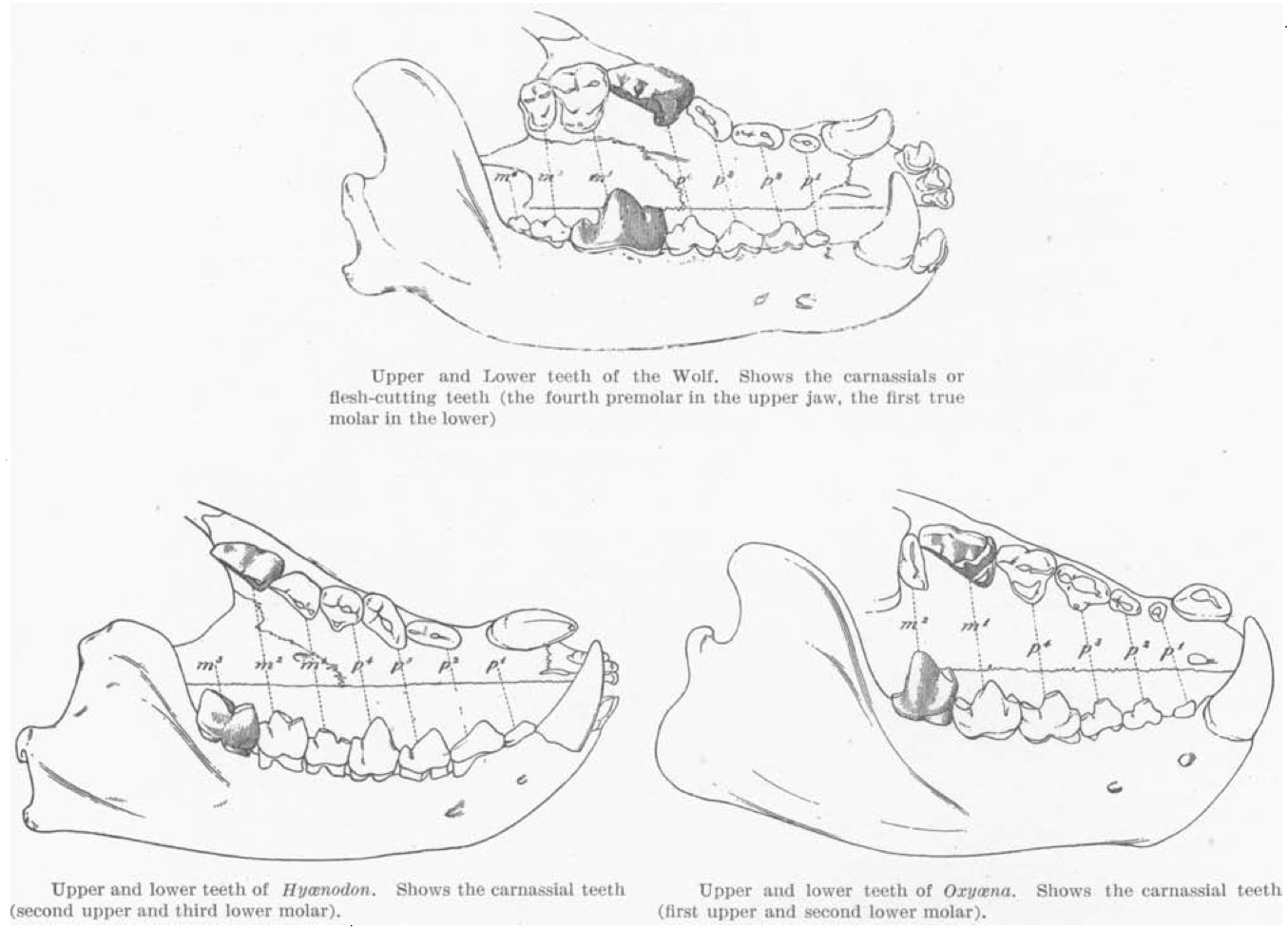
Comparison of carnassial teeth of a wolf, Hyaenodon, and Oxyaena

Compared to carnivorans, who have one pair of carnassial teeth, hyaenodonts possessed as many as three sequential pairs of carnassials or carnassial-like molar teeth in their jaws. Their skulls are known to have high sagittal crests which supported attachment for powerful temporalis muscles. Hyaenodonts, like all "creodonts", lacked post-carnassial crushing molar teeth, such as those found in many carnivoran families, especially the Canidae and Ursidae.

The anatomy of their skulls show that they had a particularly acute sense of smell, while their teeth were adapted for shearing, rather than crushing. Hyaenodonts differed from Carnivora in that they replaced their deciduous dentition slower in development than carnivorans. Studies on Hyaenodon show that juveniles took 3 to 4 years in the last stage of tooth eruption, implying a very long adolescent phase. In North American forms, the first upper premolar erupts before the first upper molar, while European forms show an earlier eruption of the first upper molar.

=== Postcranial anatomy ===
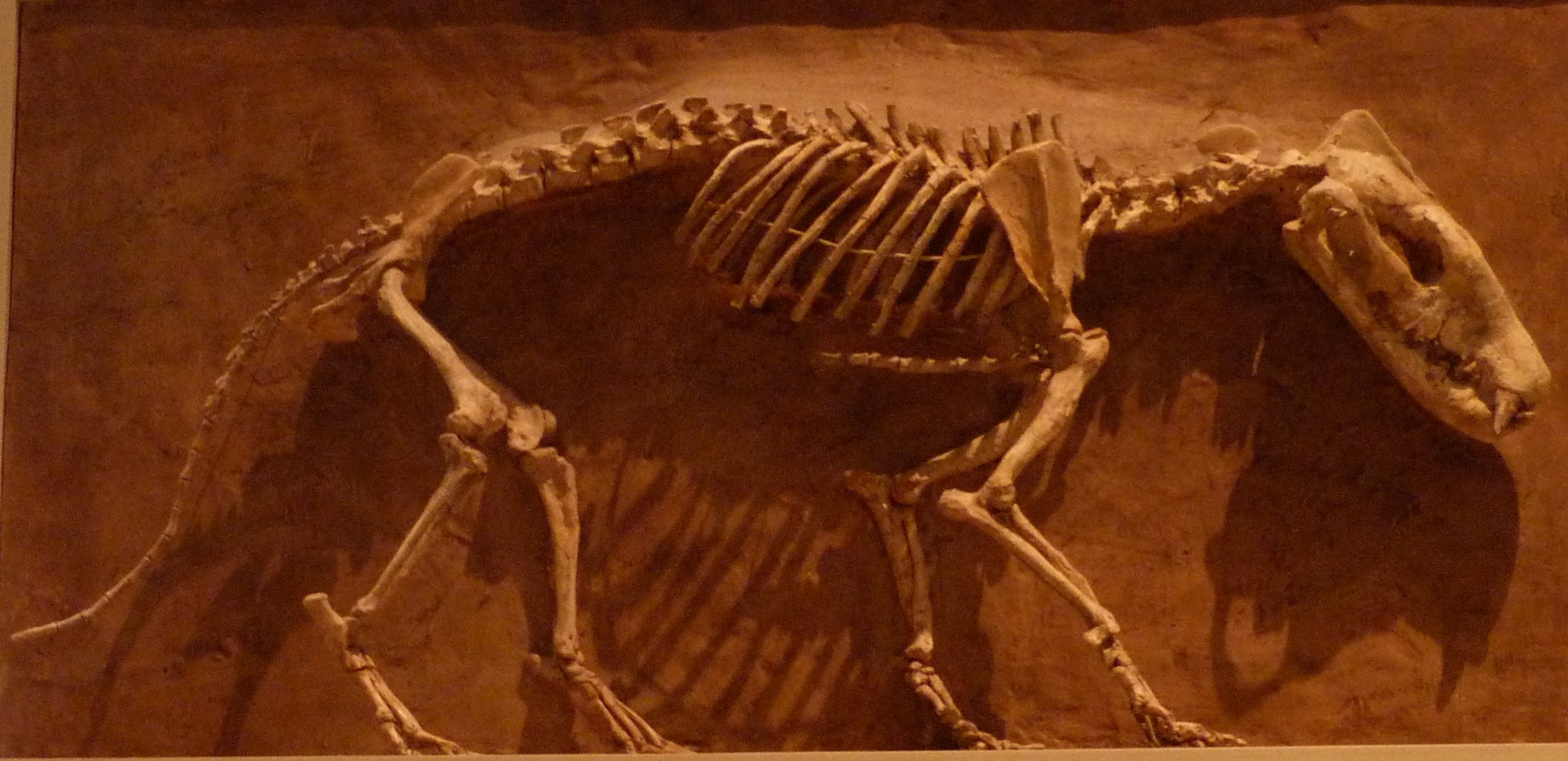
Skeleton of Hyaenodon horridus

While the neck of Hyaenodon was relatively short, the body and tail were longer in comparison. Compared to Hyainailouros, the spine of Hyaenodon was longer and more robust, suggesting it didn't bore its head as low. Cervical vertebrae of Hyaenodon was relatively short and resembled that of a felid than a canid. The femur of Hyaenodon was found to have been nearly as long as the humerus, which was short and massive, supporting a large, rounded head. Compared to carnivorans, the greater tuberosity has a more irregular shape and faces anteromedially. It would've been an insertion site for the infraspinatous muscles, which isn't seen in carnivorans. Despite this, the humerus of Hyaenodon was similar to that of wolves and hyenas. Compared to hyenas, it shows an anconeal fossa, a well-developed brachial flange and a similarly elongated trochlea shape. Despite this, the trochela shape of Hyaenodon is more similar in to the red fox.

Regressions found Hyainailouros had a humerus as robust as an average felid. Compared to the humerus of a tiger, the deltoid scar of Hyainailouros was more distally than tigers. The ulna of Hyainailouros sulzeri was arched and supported a high, well-developed olecranon, as well as a long, but strong diaphysis to the distal end of ulna. Compared to carnivorans, the fibula of Hyainailouros was thicker in comparison, with the diaphysis being twice as antero-posteriorly elongated in its distal area compared to the proximal area.

== Paleobiology ==
=== Locomotion ===
Hyaenodonts were ancestrally plantigrade, but the derived, larger hyaenodonts were generally digitigrade or semidigitigrade. Most hyaenodonts were recovered as terrestrial predators, with large hyainailourines, such as Simbakubwa and Hyainailouros were thought to have been capable of large, leaping bounds, although neither were thought to be fast runners. Some hyaenodonts, such as some species of Hyaenodon and Oxyaenoides, were recovered as cursorial predators. However, there are hyaenodont genera that weren't recovered as terrestrial predators. Several limnocyonoids Prototomus and Prolimnocyon were found to be scansorial predators. Analysis on the bony labyrinth of Hyaenodon exiguus suggests this species was semi-arboreal. Castellanos (2025) that based on elbow morphology found that Hyaenodon crucians and Hyaenodon horridus likely practiced pounce-pursuit predation. While Hyaenodon was recovered as a cursorial predator, it wasn't as cursorial as modern canids, such as wolves.

Postcranial analysis on Apterodontinae found the subfamily were semiaquatic, fossorial mammals with strong forelimbs equipped for digging similar to badgers, with tail, torso and hindlimbs showing adaptations for an aquatic lifestyle similar to otters and pinnipeds.

=== Diet ===
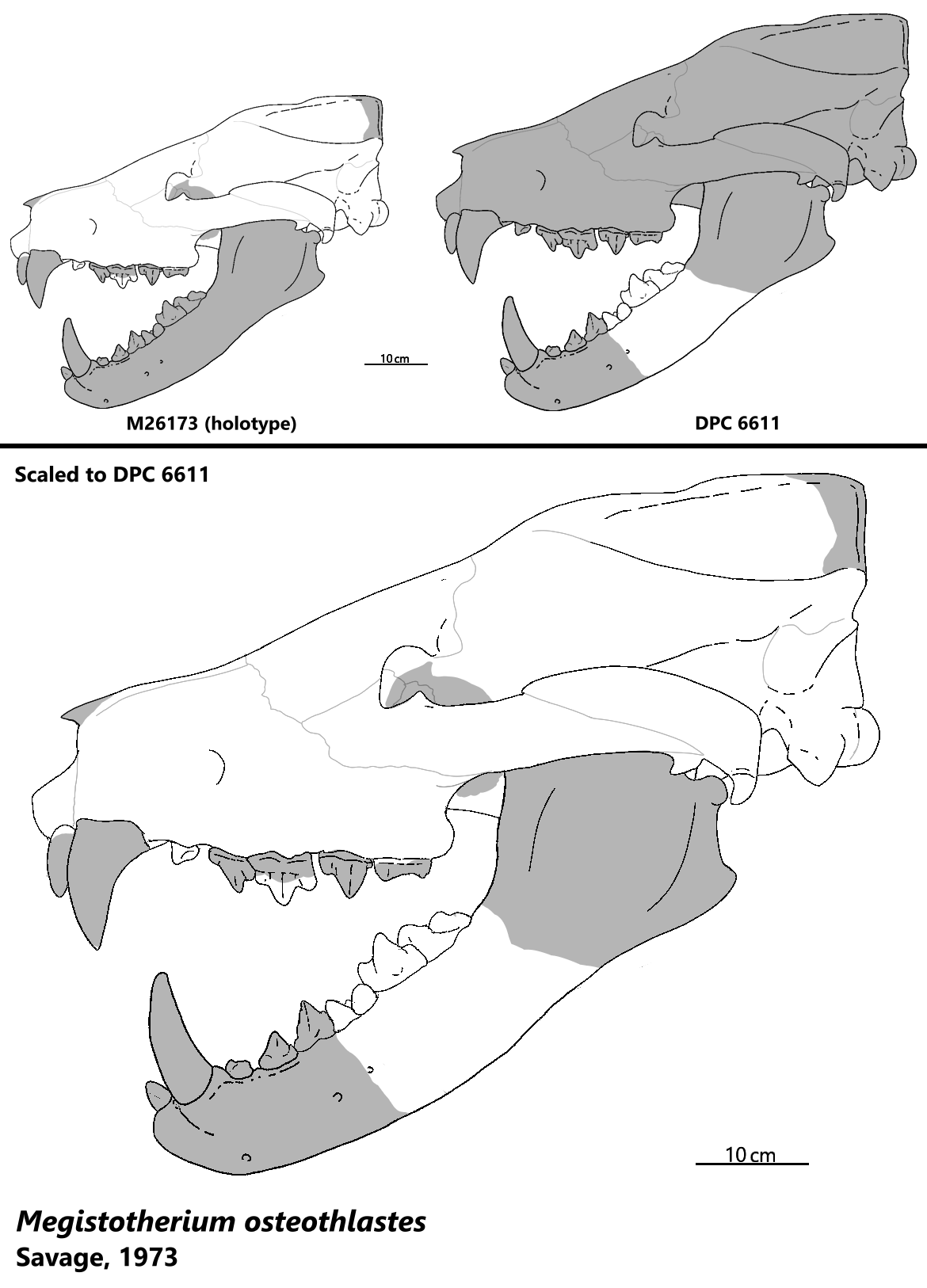
Cranial elements of Megistotherium, a hyainailourid that was thought to have been specialized on large herbivores such as proboscideans.

Many hyaenodonts were recovered as hypercarnivorous predators, meaning over 80% of their diet consisted of flesh. Fossil evidence found Hyaenodon horridus occasionally targeted smaller predators such as Dinictis and juvenile Archaeotherium. Some hyaenodonts, such as Megistotherium, Hyainailouros, and Simbakubwa, were believed to be hyperspecalized on large herbivores such as proboscideans. Savage (1973) suggested Megistotherium likely had a gap of around 30 cm (12 in), wide enough to bite down around the leg of some modern elephants. The reduction in incisor count would have minimised the damage which could be inflicted by struggling prey. Hunter-Schreger bands observed in the tooth enamel of Hyaenodon horridus, Hyainailouros, and Pterodon were zigzag, suggesting that these predators were osteophagous. Whereas those of Hyaenodon brevirostris and Hyaenodon mustelinus transition from undulating at the base of the tooth to zigzag at the tip, indicating that these species were not as well adapted for feeding on bone.

However, dental microwear patterns suggests that North American Hyaenodon had a diet more similar to lions, suggesting it ate mostly meat with various intakes of bone. On the other hand, European Hyaenodon microwear were more similar to that of spotted hyenas, suggesting bone cracking was likely a major part of their diet. Other hyaenodonts such as were noted to not have a hypercarnivorous diet. Hyaenodonts such as Anasinopa, Limnocyon, and Pakakali, were found to have been mesocarnivores or omnivores. Lesmesodon was found to have been an insectivorous-carnivorous diet based on chewing cycle analysis. Despite this, hyaenodonts weren't as versatile in their diet as carnivorans.

== Extinction ==
In North America, hyaenodonts experienced a terminal decline starting from the Middle Eocene and continued into the Oligocene. By the Oligocene, only Hyaenodon persisted before going extinct around 28 Ma. In Afro-Arabia, Afro-Arabian hyaenodonts experienced a massive decline with only 5 lineages persisting following the Eocene-Oligocene extinction event and several other extinctions. Eocene-Oligocene boundary also correlated with the decline of hyaenodont diversity in Europe, which saw the extinction of European hyainailourines and proviverrines, only one species of Hyaenodon present from the Eocene persisted into the Oligocene. Starting from the middle of the Early Oligocene, hyaenodonts saw a terminal decline in diversity, with their last occurrence being dating to MP30. After a period of diversification, Afro-Arabian hyaenodonts experienced a permanent decline during the early Miocene onwards. By the Late Miocene, the order was represented by Dissopsalis, Hyaenodon, Megistotherium (or Hyainailouros), and Metapterodon. The last hyaenodont, Dissopsalis carnifex, went extinct around 7.5 Ma.

Many experts argued that the decline and extinction of the hyaenodonts was due to competition with the carnivorans. Lang and colleagues found that the evolutionary success of carnivorans compared to hyaenodonts may have been largely influenced by the retention of a basal morphotype throughout their evolutionary history. The authors also suggested that carnivorans likely contributed in some way to the extinction of hyaenodonts, with the difference in functional morphology and adaptive potential of their carnassials possibly being a factor.

Within North America, Friscia and Valkenburgh (2010) argued that carnivorans may have limited the evolution of “creodonts”, resulting with only the large, hypercarnivorous ecomorphs remaining. They also note the size increase among carnivorans throughout the Eocene, reaching the body sizes of hyaenodonts during the Oligocene. In addition, Serio and colleagues found that North American “creodonts” had a significant degree of morphological differentiation until the middle Eocene, around this time disparity among carnivorans increasing around the same time. The authors argue that carnivoran disparity negatively impacted the disparity of creodonts, suggesting carnivorans may have outcompeted hyaenodonts.

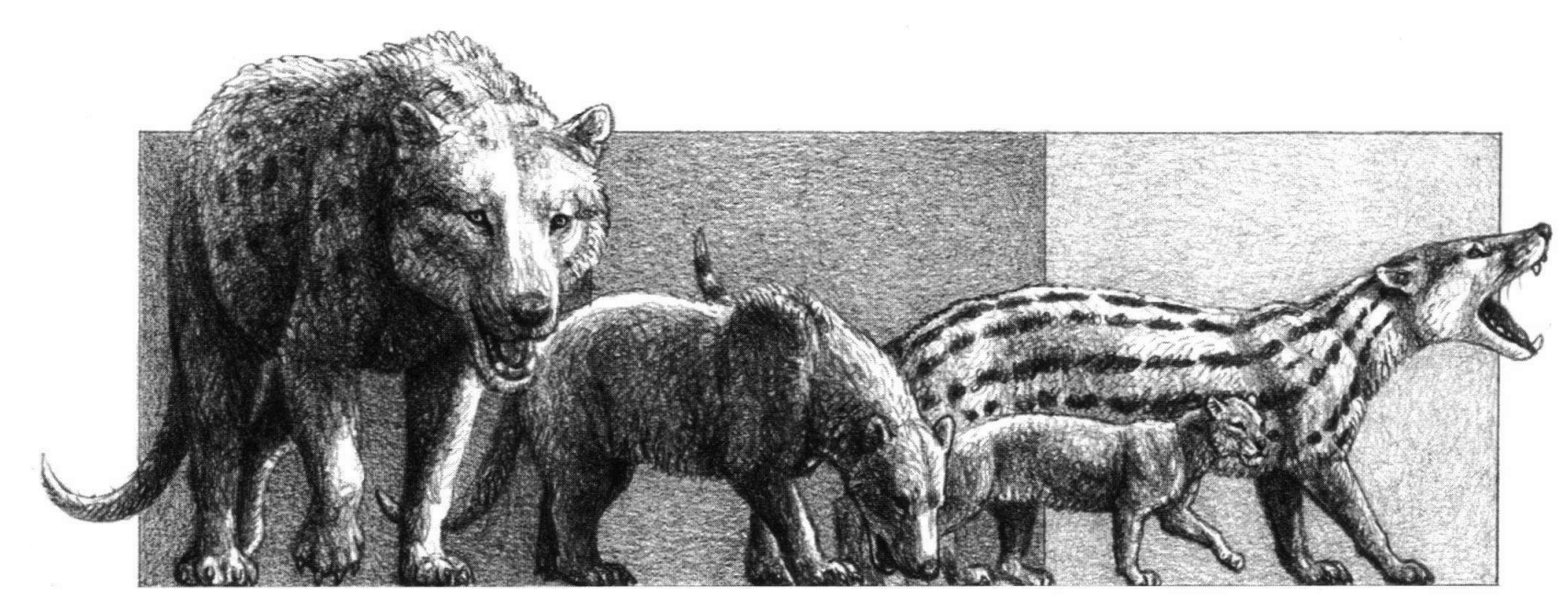
Restoration of Hyainailouros sulzeri (far left), Cynelos eurydon, Afrosmilus africanus and Hyainailouros napakensis (far right)

Within Africa, experts had hypothesized that hyaenodonts suffered from competitive displacement, as the invading carnivorans forced hyainailourids to tend towards carnivory. This was due to some of the smallest Miocene hyainailourids, Isohyaenodon and Mlanyama, showing adaptations towards hypercarnivory compared to older, mesocarnivorous hyaenodonts such as Boualitomus and Pakakali. Borths and Stevens (2019) argued that pack hunting carnivorans had larger and more complex brains, suggesting this enabled them to steal carcasses from large, solitary hyainailourines.

The decline of hyaenodonts in the late Eocene to early Oligocene extinction of European hyaenodonts, such as proviverrines and Pterodon, was thought to have been the result of Grande Coupure, a faunal turnover that was contemporary with the global Eocene-Oligocene extinction event. The Eocene-Oligocene extinction event correlates with abrupt shift towards a icehouse world, which stems from the expansion of the Antarctic ice sheets and saw sea level decline by 70 m (230 ft). Grande Coupure saw an extinction rate of 60% of western European mammalian lineages, which were replaced by Asian faunal immigrants. This included the arrival of carnivorans from Asia such as later amphicyonids, amphicynodontids, nimravids, and ursids which deprised into Western Europe via new land connection with Asia following the receding of the Turgai Strait. Lange-Badré (1979) suggested the decline of the proviverrines coincided with the arrival of carnivorans, hyaenodontines, and hyainailourines. Within the same paper, they hypothesized that Pterodon went extinct due to the climatic cooling and competition from the arriving carnivorans.

However, competitive replacement has been contested by many experts. Among large hyainailourids, the discovery of Simbakubwa suggests the evolution of large hyainailourines was thought to have been changes in the herbivore fauna instead of competition with carnivorans. Additionally, studies have found brain size have little to no correlation with sociality in carnivorans, with the relative size of the anterior brain having a larger correlation to sociality than overall brain size. Experts also argued due to the absence of canids (who dispersed into Africa by the latest Miocene), pack hunting would be difficult to assess among carnivorans in early Miocene Africa. Furthermore, vegetation in the early Miocene was generally more closed, preventing pack hunting and shorter, high speed chases from being effective. Morales and colleagues argued the decline of hyainailourids was due to the increase in aridity, as they were more adapted for forested environments as opposed to savannas, steppes, or deserts. The decline of Afro-Arabian hyaenodonts from the late Eocene to early Oligocene was due to the decline of their preferred prey such as anthropoids and hystricognaths. Their decline was also linked to the uplifting of the Ethiopian plateau, volcanism from the Afro-Arabian Large Igneous Province, and the opening of the Red Sea and Gulf of Aden.

Christison and colleagues analyzed hyaenodonts and carnivorans from Calf Creek locality of Cypress Hills Formation and found that only the smallest hyaenodont, Hyaenodon microdon had asignificant niche overlap with carnivorans. On the other hand, larger hyaenodonts, Hemipsalodon grandis and Hyaenodon horridus had very distinct niches from large carnivorans, such as Hoplophoneus. They argue this would suggest that competitive replacement wasn't the driving factor the decline and extinction of North American hyaenodonts. Instead, global climatic cooling during the earliest Oligocene resulted in drier, more open landscapes and resulted in the extinction of large browsing herbivores, including brontotheres, who were replaced by grazing mammals such as equids and rhinoceroses, which were better suited for the open environments. Because rhinoceroses didn't reach their large sizes until the Miocene, hyaenodonts were at a disadvantage due to the lack of large prey available. In addition, because of their shorter legs, they were likely at a disadvantage in the increasingly open environments. Despite recovering North American hyaenodonts as a relatively cursorial clade, Castellanos also hypothesized due their short distal limbs, hyaenodonts had less cursorial adaptations than contemporary amphicyonids and couldn't exploit open environments as well which likely led to their extinction in addition to the extinction of large browsing prey and low diversity of the order at the start the Oligocene.

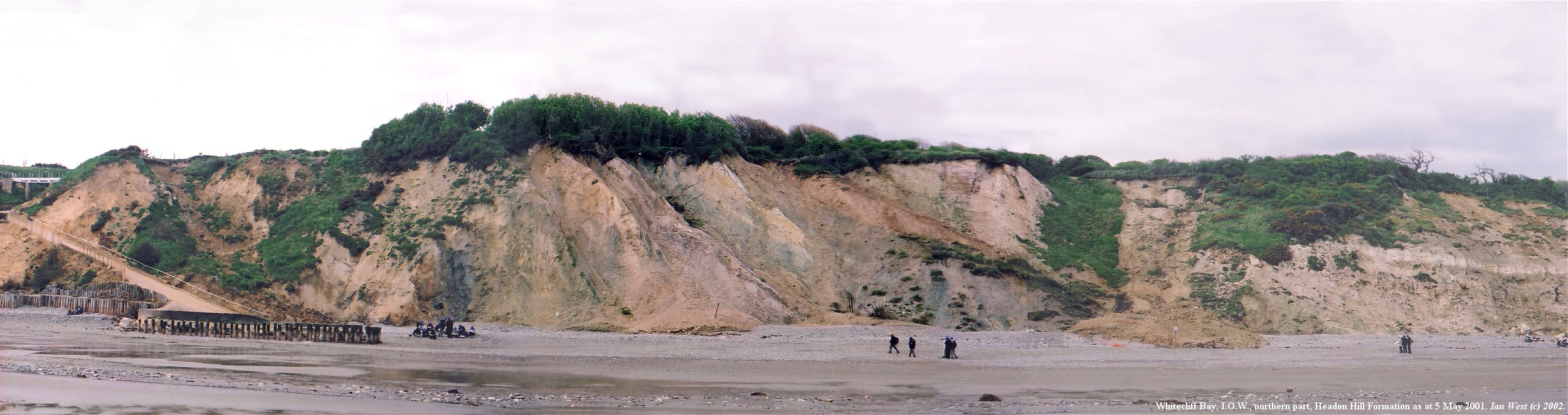
A panorama of the Headon Hill Formation in the Isle of Wight, from which Anoplotherium material has been collected. The stratigraphy of it and the Bouldnor Formation led to better understandings of faunal chronologies from the Late Eocene up to the Grande Coupure.

In Europe, Solé et al. (2015) found no evidence of hyainailourines being responsible for the decline of proviverrines, as the latter ever exceeded 20 kg (44 lb). This made them significantly smaller than the contemporary hyainailourines, which weighed at least 40 kg (88 lb). This suggested hyainailourines occupied different niches than proviverrines, with the latter possibly even being predated upon. Solé et al. (2022) found no evidence of competitive replacement by carnivoranforms have been found in Europe as hyaenodonts were more diverse than carnivoraforms until the Grand Coupure. They also found the carnivorous fauna transition was gradual as proviverrines and hyainailourines went extinct during disappeared MP19-20, while newcomers appeared MP21. Hyaenodon, who survived the Grande Coupure, niche partitoned from amphicyonids by preferring different habitats, with Hyaenodon preferring more forested environments compared to amphicyonids, who preferred more open environments. Analysis on the body mass dynamics of European hyaenodonts and carnivoramorphans found hyaenodonts didn't experience a decrease in body mass when the body mass of carnivoramorphans increased suggesting a notable niche partition between the two clades. This suggests the extinction of European hyaenodonts during the Oligocene is believed to have been caused by climatic changes rather than competition with carnivorans.

== See also ==
- Mammal classification
