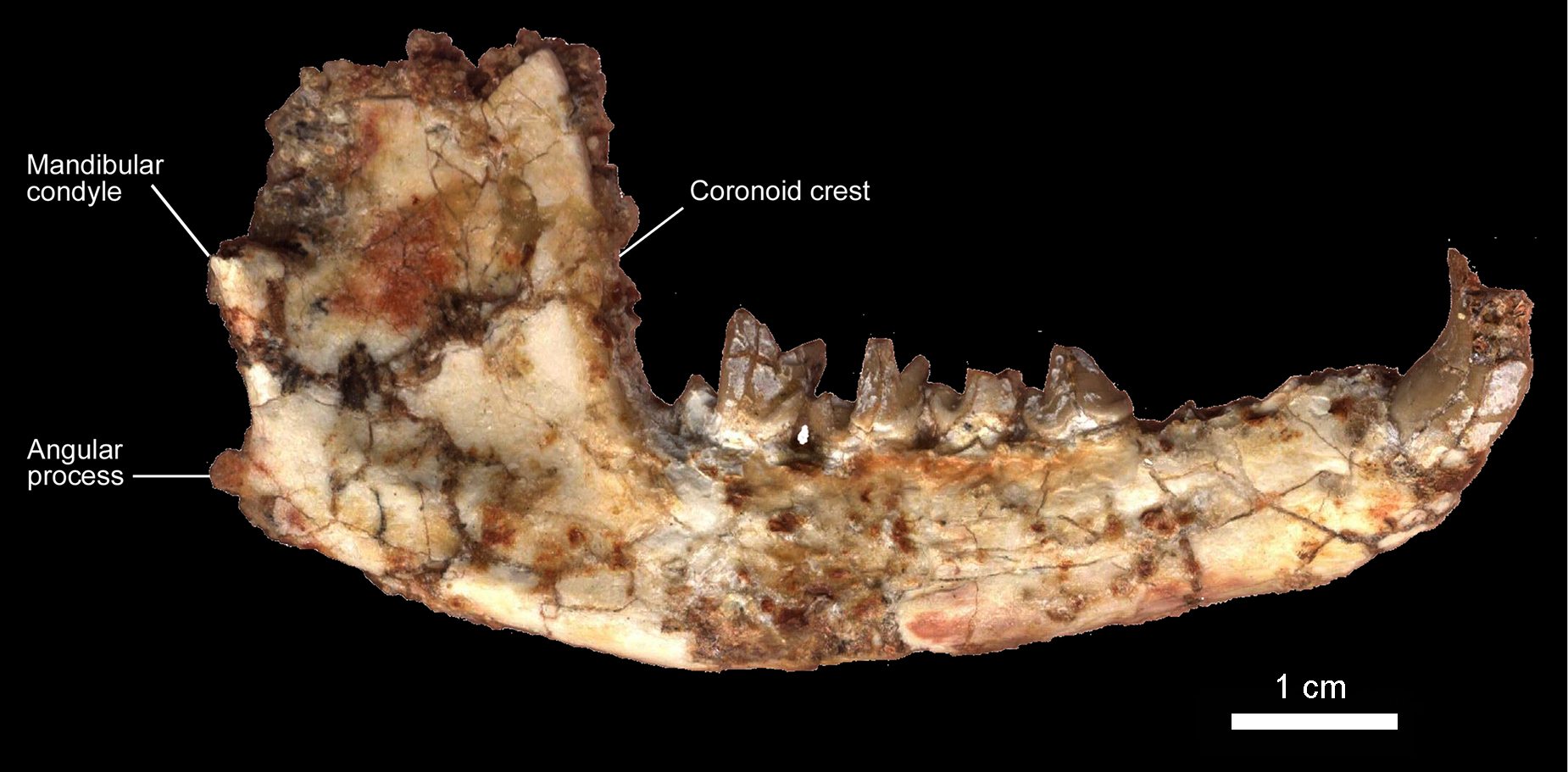
- lower jaw of Furodon crocheti

Scientific classification
- Kingdom: Animalia
- Phylum: Chordata
- Class: Mammalia
- Order: †Hyaenodonta
- Superfamily: †Hyainailouroidea
- Genus: †Furodon; Solé et al., 2013

Type species
- †Furodon crocheti Solé et al., 2013

= Furodon =

Furodon Temporal range: 49.3–45.7 Ma Early to Middle Eocene

Extinct genus of placental mammals

Furodon ("tooth of a thief") is an extinct genus of placental mammals from extinct order Hyaenodonta, that lived in North Africa (Tunisia and Algeria) from the early to middle Eocene epoch. It is a monotypic genus that contains the species F. crocheti.
