= Lahimia =

Lahimia Temporal range: 61.6–59.2 Ma middle Paleocene

Scientific classification
- Domain: Eukaryota
- Kingdom: Animalia
- Phylum: Chordata
- Class: Mammalia
- Order: †Hyaenodonta
- Clade: †Boualitominae
- Genus: †Lahimia; Solé, 2009

Type species
- †Lahimia selloumi Solé, 2009

Extinct genus of mammals

Lahimia ("carnivore") is an extinct genus of placental mammals from extinct paraphyletic clade Boualitominae within extinct order Hyaenodonta, known from the middle Paleocene (Selandian stage) of Morocco. Lahimia selloumi is one of the oldest known members of order Hyaenodonta.
