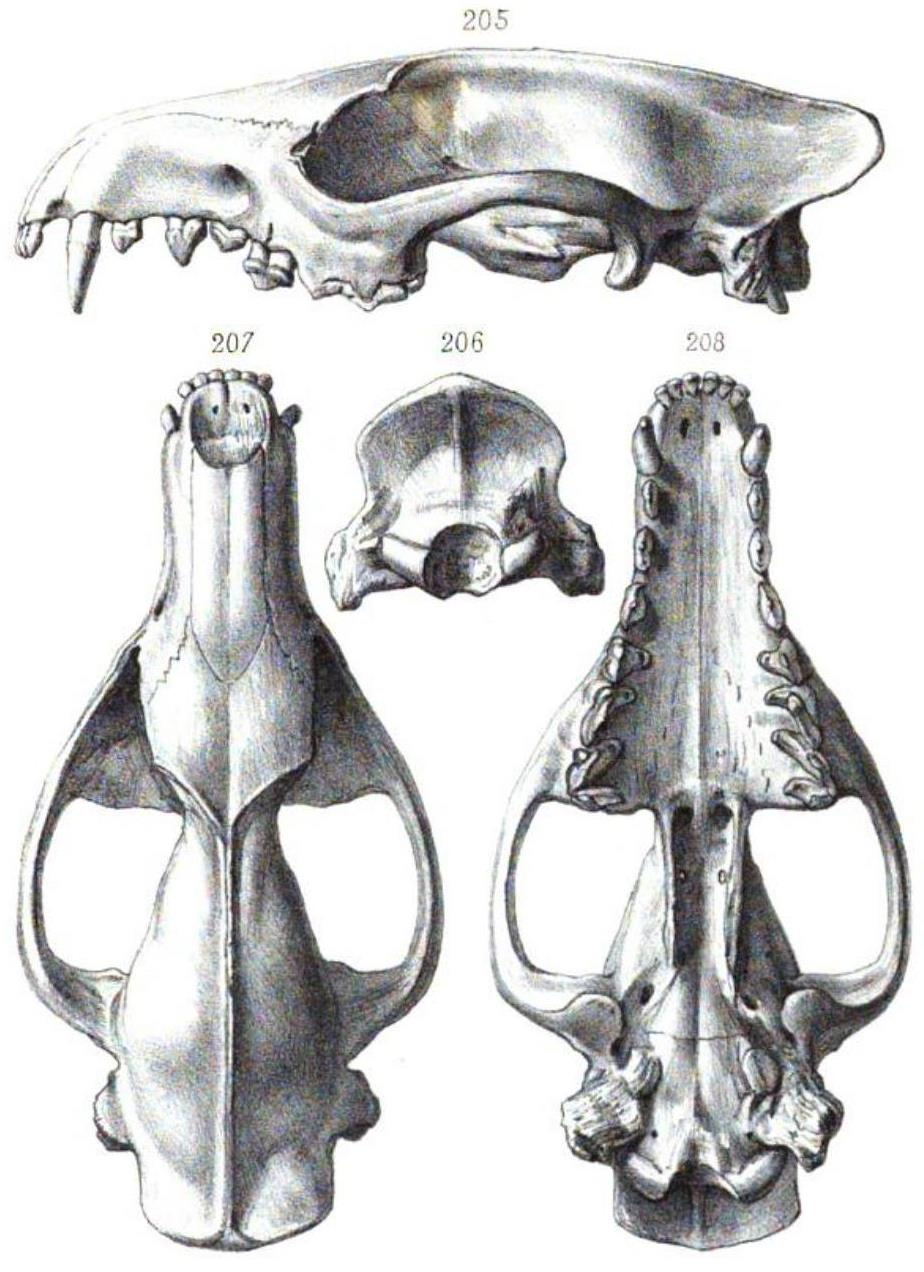
- skull of Cynohyaenodon cayluxi

Scientific classification
- Kingdom: Animalia
- Phylum: Chordata
- Class: Mammalia
- Infraclass: Placentalia
- Order: †Hyaenodonta
- Superfamily: †Hyaenodontoidea
- Family: †Hyaenodontidae
- Genus: †Cynohyaenodon; Filhol, 1873

Type species
- †Cynohyaenodon cayluxi Filhol, 1873

Species
- †C. cayluxi (Filhol, 1873); †C. lautricensis (Lange-Badré, 1978); †C. ruetimeyeri (Van Valen, 1965); †C. smithae (Solé, 2021); †C. trux (Van Valen, 1965)

Synonyms
- synonyms of genus: Pseudosinopa (Depéret, 1917); synonyms of species: C. cayluxi: Proviverra cayluri (Gaudry, 1878); Proviverra cayluxi (Gaudry, 1878); Stypolophus cayluxi (Cope, 1880); C. lautricensis: Quercitherium lautricensis (Lange-Badré, 1978); C. ruetimeyeri: Pseudosinopa ruetimeyeri (Depéret, 1917)

= Cynohyaenodon =

Cynohyaenodon Temporal range: 50.8–37.8 Ma Early to Middle Eocene

Extinct family of mammals

Cynohyaenodon ("dog-like Hyaenodon") is an extinct paraphyletic genus of placental mammals from extinct family Hyaenodontidae that lived from the early to middle Eocene in Europe.
