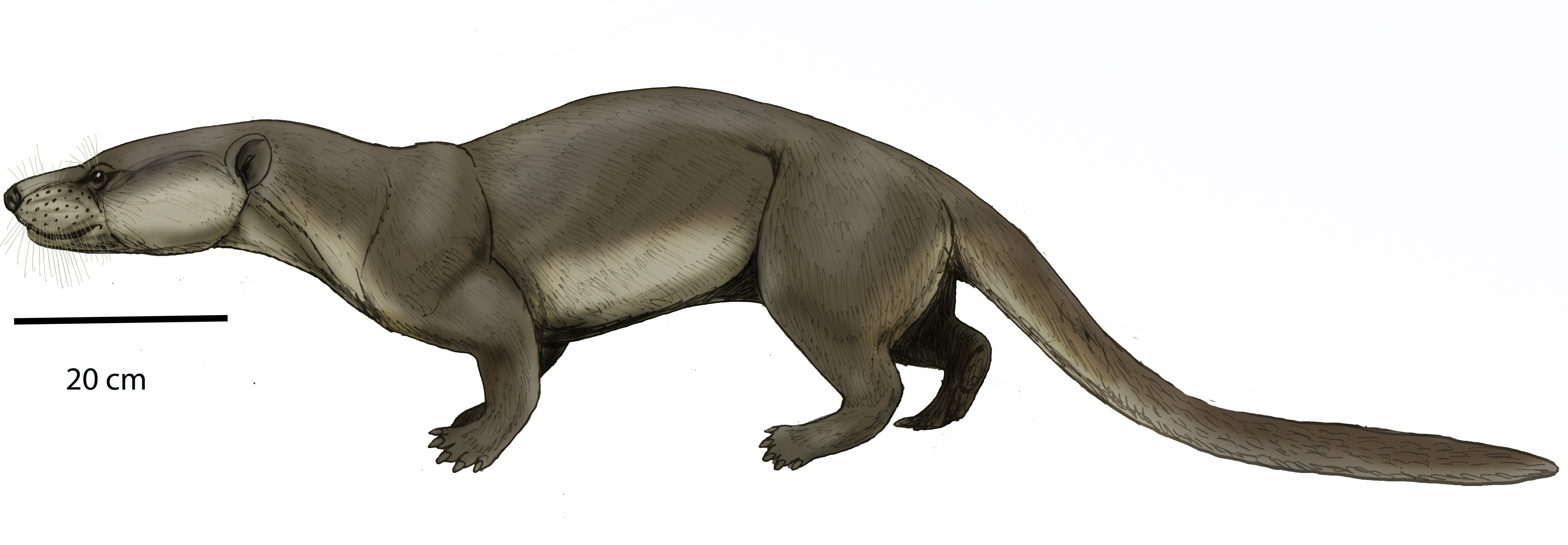
- Apterodon macrognathus life restoration

Scientific classification
- Kingdom: Animalia
- Phylum: Chordata
- Class: Mammalia
- Infraclass: Placentalia
- Order: †Hyaenodonta
- Superfamily: †Hyainailouroidea
- Family: †Hyainailouridae
- Subfamily: †Apterodontinae; Szalay, 1967

Type genus
- †Apterodon Fischer, 1880

Genera
- †Apterodon; †Quasiapterodon

Synonyms
- Apterodontini (Szalay, 1967)

= Apterodontinae =

Apterodontinae Temporal range: 39.6–27.8 Ma Late Eocene to Middle Oligocene
- Two views of the skull of Apterodon macrognathus

Extinct subfamily of mammals

Apterodontinae ("without winged tooth") is an extinct subfamily of hyaenodonts from extinct paraphyletic family Hyainailouridae, specialised for aquatic, otter-like habits. They lived in Africa and Europe from the late Eocene to middle Oligocene.

== Classification and phylogeny ==
=== Taxonomy ===
- Subfamily: †Apterodontinae (Szalay, 1967)
  - Genus: †Apterodon (Fischer, 1880)
    - †Apterodon altidens (Schlosser, 1910)
    - †Apterodon gaudryi (Fischer, 1880)
    - †Apterodon langebadreae (Grohé, 2012)
    - †Apterodon macrognathus (Andrews, 1904)
    - †Apterodon rauenbergensis (Frey, 2010)
    - †Apterodon saghensis (Simons & Gingerich, 1976)
    - †Apterodon sp. [Dur At-Talah escarpment, Libya] (Grohé, 2012)
  - Genus: †Quasiapterodon (Lavrov, 1999)
    - †Quasiapterodon minutus (Schlosser, 1910)
