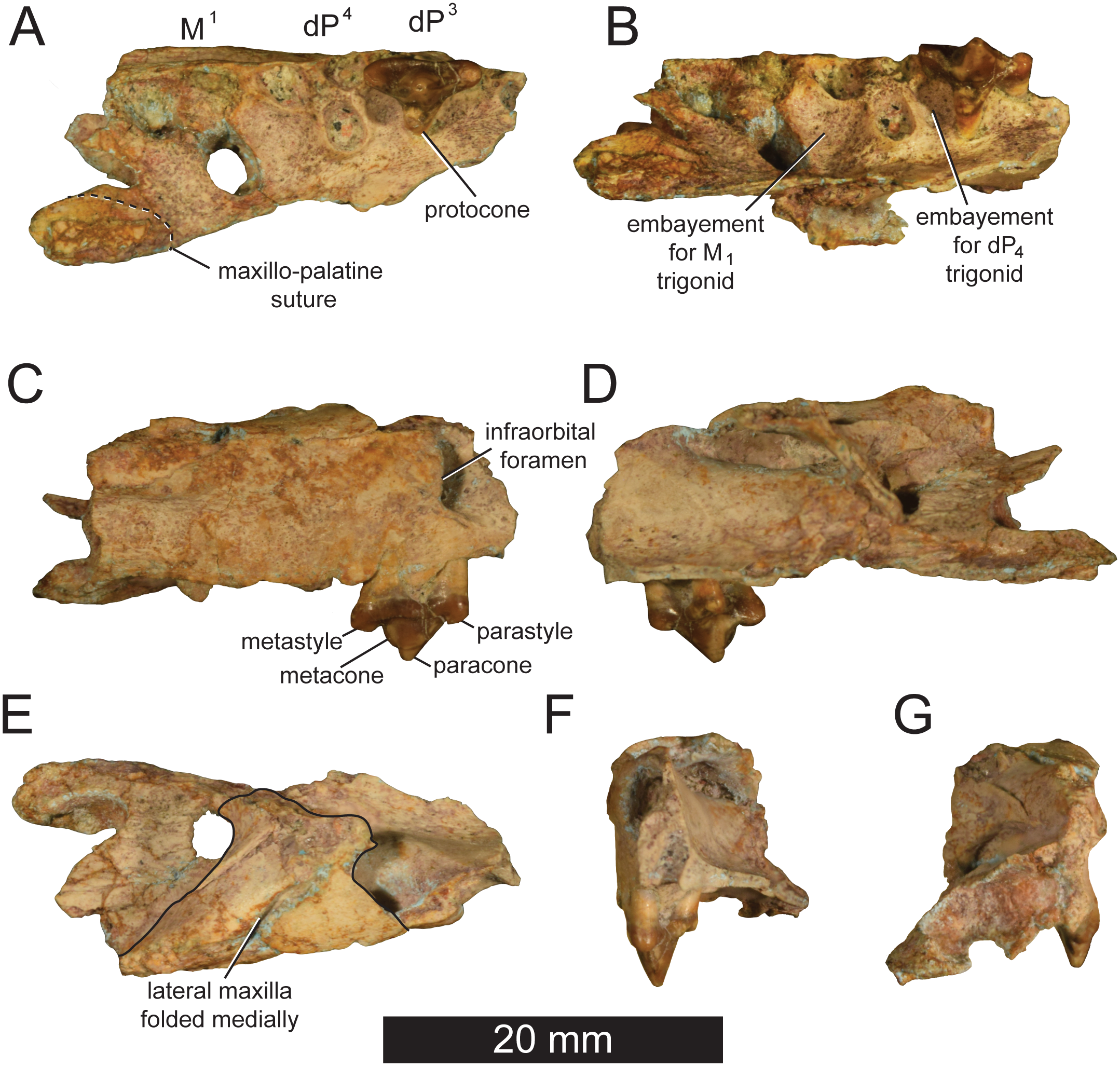
- Pakakali rukwaensis lower jaw fragment

Scientific classification
- Kingdom: Animalia
- Phylum: Chordata
- Class: Mammalia
- Infraclass: Placentalia
- Order: †Hyaenodonta
- Superfamily: †Hyainailouroidea
- Family: †Hyainailouridae
- Subfamily: †Hyainailourinae
- Genus: †Pakakali; Borths & Stevens, 2017

Type species
- †Pakakali rukwaensis Borths & Stevens, 2017

= Pakakali =

Pakakali Temporal range: 25.2–24.95 Ma Late Oligocene

Extinct genus of mammal

Pakakali ("fierce cat") is an extinct genus of hyainailouroid hyaenodont classified as either a teratodontine or hyainailourine that lived in what is now Tanzania during the Late Oligocene. It is known from a single species, P. rukwaensis.
