= Parvavorodon =

Parvavorodon Temporal range: 49.3–45.7 Ma early to middle Eocene

Scientific classification
- Domain: Eukaryota
- Kingdom: Animalia
- Phylum: Chordata
- Class: Mammalia
- Order: †Hyaenodonta
- Genus: †Parvavorodon; Solé et al., 2013

Type species
- †Parvavorodon gheerbranti Solé et al., 2013

Extinct genus of mammals

Parvavorodon ("small devouring tooth") is an extinct genus of placental mammals from extinct order Hyaenodonta, that lived in North Africa (Morocco and Algeria) from the early to middle Eocene epoch. It is a monotypic genus that contains the species P. gheerbranti.
