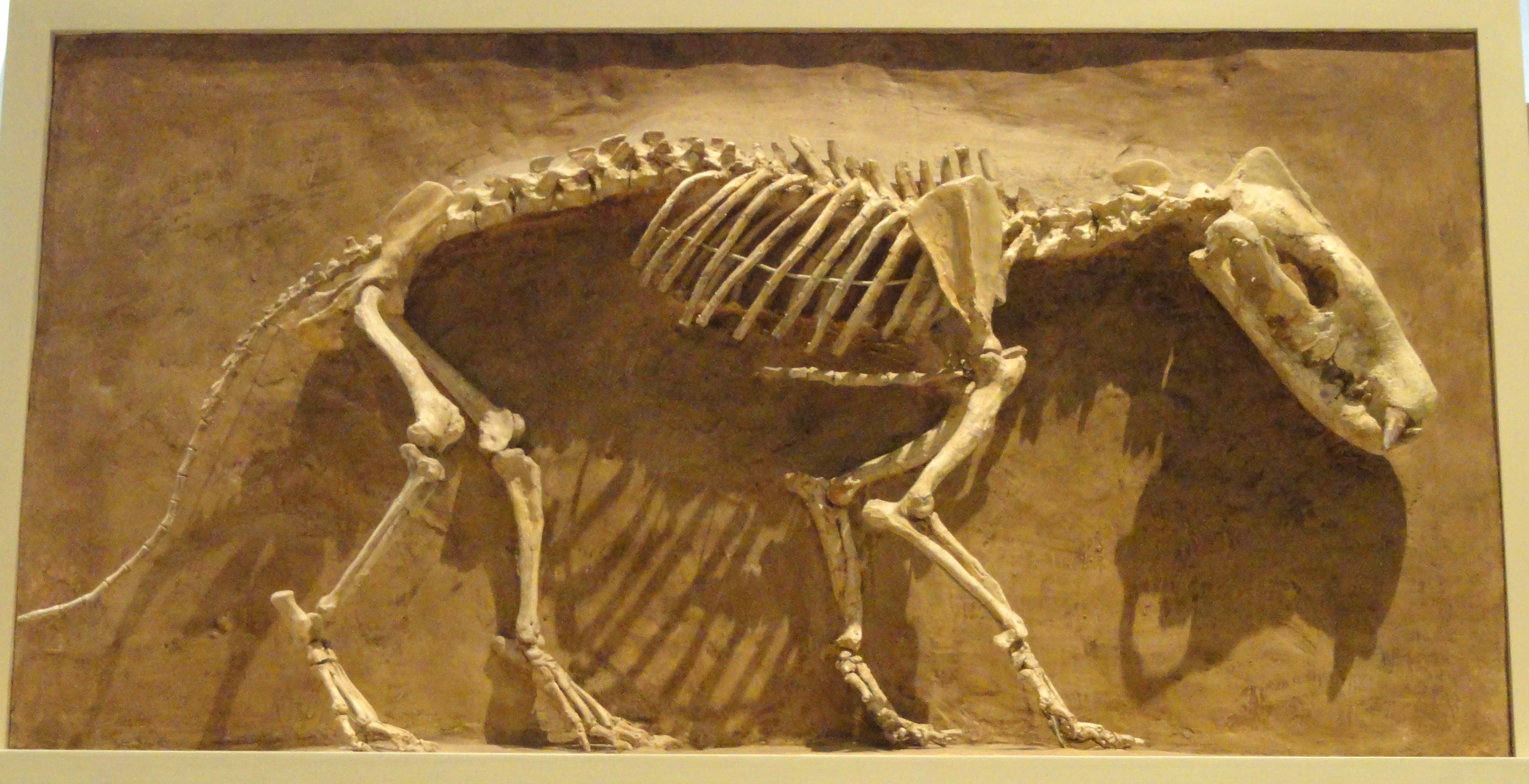
- Mounted Hyaenodon skeleton, Royal Ontario Museum

Scientific classification
- Kingdom: Animalia
- Phylum: Chordata
- Class: Mammalia
- Order: †Hyaenodonta
- Family: †Hyaenodontidae
- Subfamily: †Hyaenodontinae
- Tribe: †Hyaenodontini; Leidy, 1869
- Genus: †Hyaenodon; Laizer & Parieu, 1838

Type species
- †Hyaenodon leptorhynchus Laizer and Parieu, 1838

Species
- [see Taxonomy]
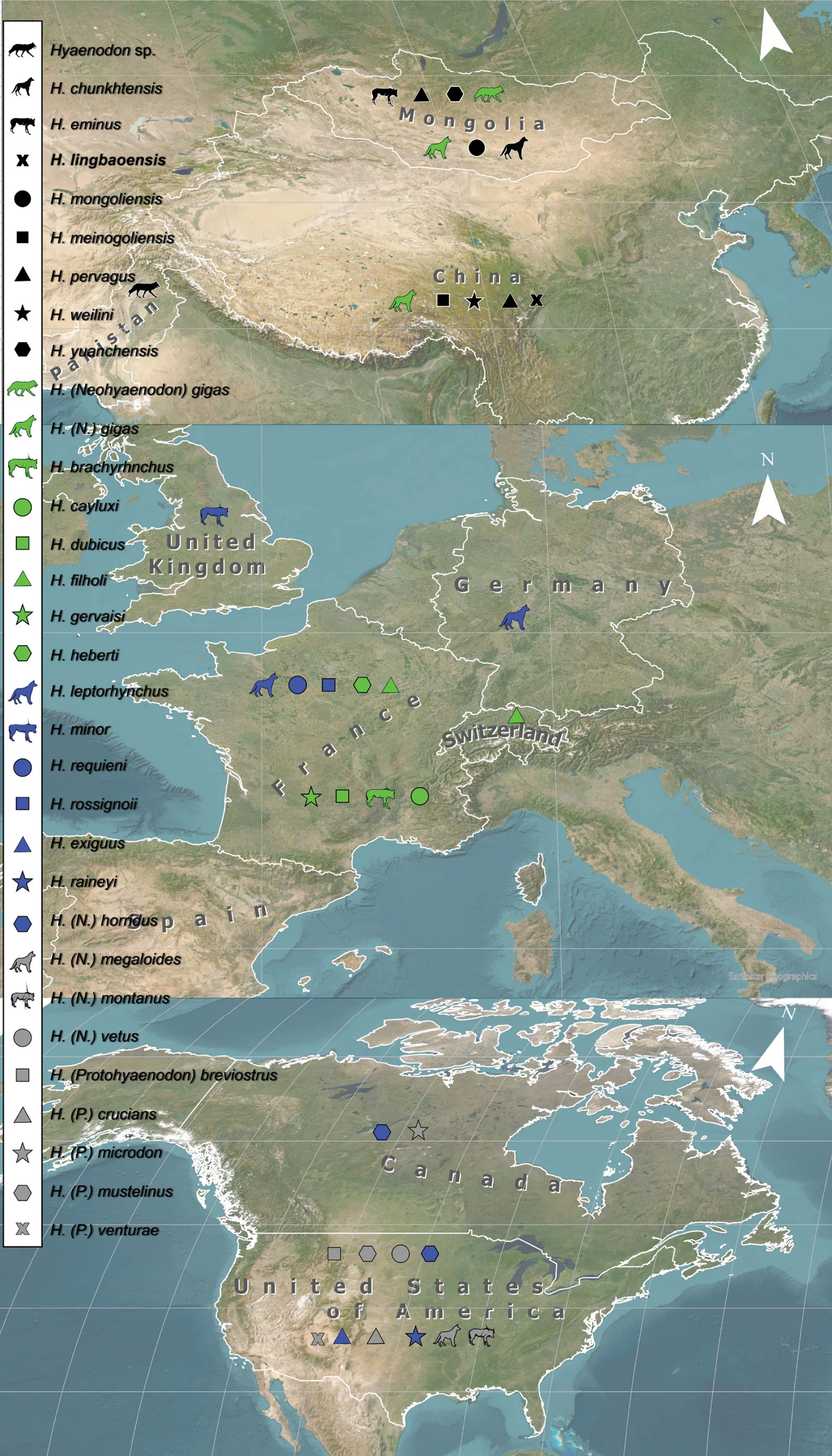
- Distribution of Hyaenodon across North America and Eurasia

Synonyms
- synonyms of genus: Gobipterodon (Lavrov, 1999); Macrohyaenodon (Lavrov & Emry, 1998); Macropterodon (Lavrov, 1999); Megalopterodon (Dashzeveg, 1964); Microhyaenodon (Lavrov, 1999); Neohyaenodon (Thorpe, 1922); Prohyaenodon (Lavrov, 1999); Protohyaenodon (Stock, 1933); Pseudopterodon (Schlosser, 1887); Taxotherium (Blainville, 1841); synonyms of species: H. brachyrhynchus: Canis brachyrhynchus (Blainville, 1841); Hyaenodon brachyrhenchus (Lavrov, 1999); Hyaenodon cuvieri (Pictet, 1853); Hyaenodon leptorhynchus (Dujardin, 1840); Hyaenodon parisiensis (Laurillard, 1845); Hyaenodon vulpinum (Filhol, 1877); Hyaenodon vulpinus (Gervais, 1873); Nasua parisiensis (Blainville, 1841); Pterodon brachyrhynchus (Pomel, 1846); Pterodon cuvieri (Pomel, 1846); Taxotherium parisiense (Blainville, 1841); H. brevirostrus: Hyaenodon brevirostris (Joeckel, 1997); Protohyaenodon brevirostrus (Mellett, 1977); H. chunkhtensis: Microhyaenodon chunkhtensis (Lavrov, 1999); H. crucians: Hyaenodon leptocephalus (Scott, 1888); Hyaenodon minutus (Douglass, 1902); Hyaenodon paucidens (Osborn & Wortman, 1894); Protohyaenodon crucians (Mellett, 1977); Prtohyaenodon crucians (Lavrov, 1999); Pseudopterodon minutus (Douglass, 1902); H. dubius: Hyaenodon aymardi (Filhol, 1882); H. exiguus: Hyaenodon exigus (Lavrov, 1999); Pterodon exiguum (Gervais, 1873); H. filholi: Hyaenodon compressus (Filhol, 1876); Hyaenodon vulpinus (Filhol, 1876); Microhyaenodon filholi (Lavrov, 1999); Pseudopterodon ganodus (Schlosser, 1887); H. gervaisi: Hyaenodon ambiguous; Hyaenodon ambiguus (Martin, 1906); H. gigas: Macropterodon zelenovi (Lavrov, 1999); Neohyaenodon gigas (Lavrov, 1999); H. heberti: Hyaenodon arnaudi (Depéret, 1917); H. horridus: Hyaenodon cruentus (Leidy, 1853); Neohyaenodon horridus (Thorpe, 1922); Neohyaenodon semseyi (Kretzoi, 1941); H. incertus: Gobipterodon exploratus (Lavrov, 1999); Hyaenodon exploratus (Polly, 1993); Neohyaenodon incertus (Lavrov, 1999); Pterodon exploratus (Dashzeveg, 1985); H. leptorhynchus: Canis leptorhynchus (Blainville, 1841); Hyaenodon bavaricus (Dehm, 1935); Hyaenodon cayluxi (Filhol, 1876); Hyaenodon martini (Depéret, 1917); Hyaenodon milloquensis (Martin, 1906); Pterodon leptorhynchus (Pomel, 1846); H. macrocephalus: Neohyaenodon macrocephalus (Lavrov, 1999); H. megaloides: Neohyaenodon megaloides (Mellett, 1977); H. microdon: Microhyaenodon microdon (Lavrov, 1999); Protohyaenodon microdon (Mellett, 1977); H. milvinus: Neohyaenodon milvinus (Lavrov, 1999); H. minor: Hyaenodon aimi (Cooper, 1926); Hyaenodon hantonensis (Lydekker, 1884); H. mongoliensis: Epipterodon mongoliensis (Lavrov, 1999); Megalopterodon mongoliensis (Dashzeveg, 1964); Neohyaenodon mongoliensis (Morlo & Nagel, 2006); Pterodon mongoliensis (Van Valen, 1967); H. montanus: Protohyaenodon montanus; Neohyaenodon montanus (Mellett, 1977); H. mustelinus: Hyaenodon mustilinius; Prohyaenodon mustelinus (Lavrov, 1999); Protohyaenodon mustelinus (Scott, 1894); H. pervagus: Hyaenodon neimongoliensis (Huang & Zhu, 2002); H. pumilus: Microhyaenodon pumilus (Lavrov, 1999); H. raineyi: Microhyaenodon raineyi (Lavrov, 1999); Protohyaenodon raineyi (Gustafson, 1986); H. requieni: Hyaenodon heberti euzetensis (Depéret, 1917); Pterodon requieni (Gervais, 1846); H. venturae: Hyaenodon exiguus (Stock, 1933); Microhyaenodon venturae (Lavrov, 1999); Protohyaenodon exiguus (Stock, 1933); Protohyaenodon venturae (Mellett, 1977); H. vetus: Neohyaenodon vetus (Mellett, 1977); Pterodon californicus (Stock, 1933); H. yuanchuensis: Hyaenodon yuanchüensis (Young, 1937)

= Hyaenodon =

Hyaenodon Temporal range: Middle Eocene to Late Miocene (Bartonian to Tortonian) 38–11.4 Ma

Extinct genus of mammals

Hyaenodon ("hyena-tooth") is an extinct genus of carnivorous placental mammals from the tribe Hyaenodontini, part of the subfamily Hyaenodontinae (which is within the family Hyaenodontidae), that belonged to the now extinct order Hyaenodonta. The genus was found lived in Eurasia and North America from the Middle Eocene to the Late Miocene, from 38 to 11.4 million years ago, existing for 26.6 million years. Hyaenodon was thought to have evolved in Asia, probably evolving from Propterodon.

The genus currently consists of at least 40 species, although due to sexual dimorphism and intraspecific variation, there were likely fewer species within the genus. The species within the genus ranged in size from H. lingaoensis to H. gigas and H. mongoliensis, which were estimated to be similar in size to Hyainailouros.

Smaller species, such as H. microdon, were small predators, having to compete with contemporary small carnivorans. On the other hand, the largest species were likely the apex predators of their time, hunting large herbivores of their environments. Fossil records also suggests they were also capable of hunting smaller predators. Several species within the genus were cursorial predators, either being ambushing or pounce-pursuit predators. The canines of the animal mediolaterally compressed much like canids, landing shallow bites on their prey. Unlike canids such as wolves, they are thought to have been solitary predators.

The genus saw a decline during the Late Eocene to Early Oligocene, with only a few species being present in the Miocene. Many experts hypothesize their decline and extinction was the result of competition with carnivorans. Although, this hypothesis has been challenged over the recent years. With many experts instead hypothesizing the cause of their decline and eventual extinction was the inability to adapt to open environments.

== Classification and phylogeny ==
=== Classification ===
Hyaenodon was a type genus of the family Hyaenodontidae, a group of hyaenodonts that arose during the Late Paleocene or Early Eocene. The family is considered to be a sister clade to proviverrines, a clade of hyaenodonts that were endemic to Europe. Both clades formed the superfamily, Hyaenodontoidea. Hyaenodonts were once considered to be part of "Creodonta", although recent analysis recovered hyaenodonts as an entirely separate order from oxyaenids.

=== Taxonomy ===
- Tribe: †Hyaenodontini (Leidy, 1869)
  - Genus: †Hyaenodon (Laizer & Parieu, 1838)
    - †Hyaenodon brachyrhynchus (Blainville, 1841)
    - †Hyaenodon chunkhtensis (Dashzeveg, 1985)
    - †Hyaenodon dubius (Filhol, 1873)
    - †Hyaenodon eminus (Matthew & Granger, 1925)
    - †Hyaenodon exiguus (Gervais, 1873)
    - †Hyaenodon filholi (Schlosser, 1887)
    - †Hyaenodon gervaisi (Martin, 1906)
    - †Hyaenodon heberti (Filhol, 1876)
    - †Hyaenodon leptorhynchus (Laizer & Parieu, 1838)
    - †Hyaenodon lingbaoensis (Li, 2025)
    - †Hyaenodon minor (Lange-Badré, 1979)
    - †Hyaenodon pervagus (Matthew & Granger, 1924)
    - †Hyaenodon pumilus (Lavrov, 2019)
    - †Hyaenodon requieni (Gervais, 1846)
    - †Hyaenodon rossignoli (Lange-Badré, 1979)
    - †Hyaenodon weilini (Wang, 2005)
    - †Hyaenodon yuanchuensis (Young, 1937)
    - Subgenus: †Neohyaenodon ^{(paraphyletic subgenus)} (Thorpe, 1922)
      - †Hyaenodon gigas (Dashzeveg, 1985)
      - †Hyaenodon horridus (Leidy, 1853)
      - †Hyaenodon incertus (Dashzeveg, 1985)
      - †Hyaenodon macrocephalus (Lavrov, 1999)
      - †Hyaenodon megaloides (Mellett, 1977)
      - †Hyaenodon milvinus (Lavrov, 1999)
      - †Hyaenodon mongoliensis (Dashzeveg, 1964)
      - †Hyaenodon montanus (Douglass, 1902)
      - †Hyaenodon vetus (Stock, 1933)
    - Subgenus: †Protohyaenodon ^{(paraphyletic subgenus)} (Stock, 1933)
      - †Hyaenodon brevirostrus (Macdonald, 1970)
      - †Hyaenodon crucians (Leidy, 1853)
      - †Hyaenodon exiguus (Stock, 1933)
      - †Hyaenodon microdon (Mellett, 1977)
      - †Hyaenodon mustelinus (Scott, 1894)
      - †Hyaenodon raineyi (Gustafson, 1986)
      - †Hyaenodon venturae (Mellett, 1977)

== Species ==
=== Asian species ===
- Hyaenodon lingaoensis

H. lingaoensis was the oldest known species within the genus, found in the Chuankou Formation of the Middle Eocene. The authors hypothesized the species may represent a transitional form of Propterodon and later Hyaenodon species.

- Hyaenodon weilini

H. weilini was first described by Qiu et al. (1997) as an unnamed species of Hyaenodon. The species would be described by Wang et al. (2005), being distinguished from Hyainailouros with a more reduced protocol and metastyle notches, which had thin shearing blades. The species is thought to have been evolved within the same lineage of H. gigas.

=== North American species ===
- Hyaenodon vetus

H. vetus was originally described by Stock (1933) based on a skull with upper dentition. It differentiated from Oligocene Hyaenodon with its postnasal passage, which didn't extend as far back as Oligocene Hyaenodon species. The pronounced postorbital constriction and the possible lack of noticeable backward tension of the tooth row suggests H. vetus was less derived. Pterodon californicus is considered synonymous with this species.

- Hyaenodon exiguus

H. exiguus was described by Stock (1933) and was known from maxillary fragments and a ramus with dentition. It was noted to have been different from Oligocene species with the inner lobe of P4 projecting more inward.

== Description ==
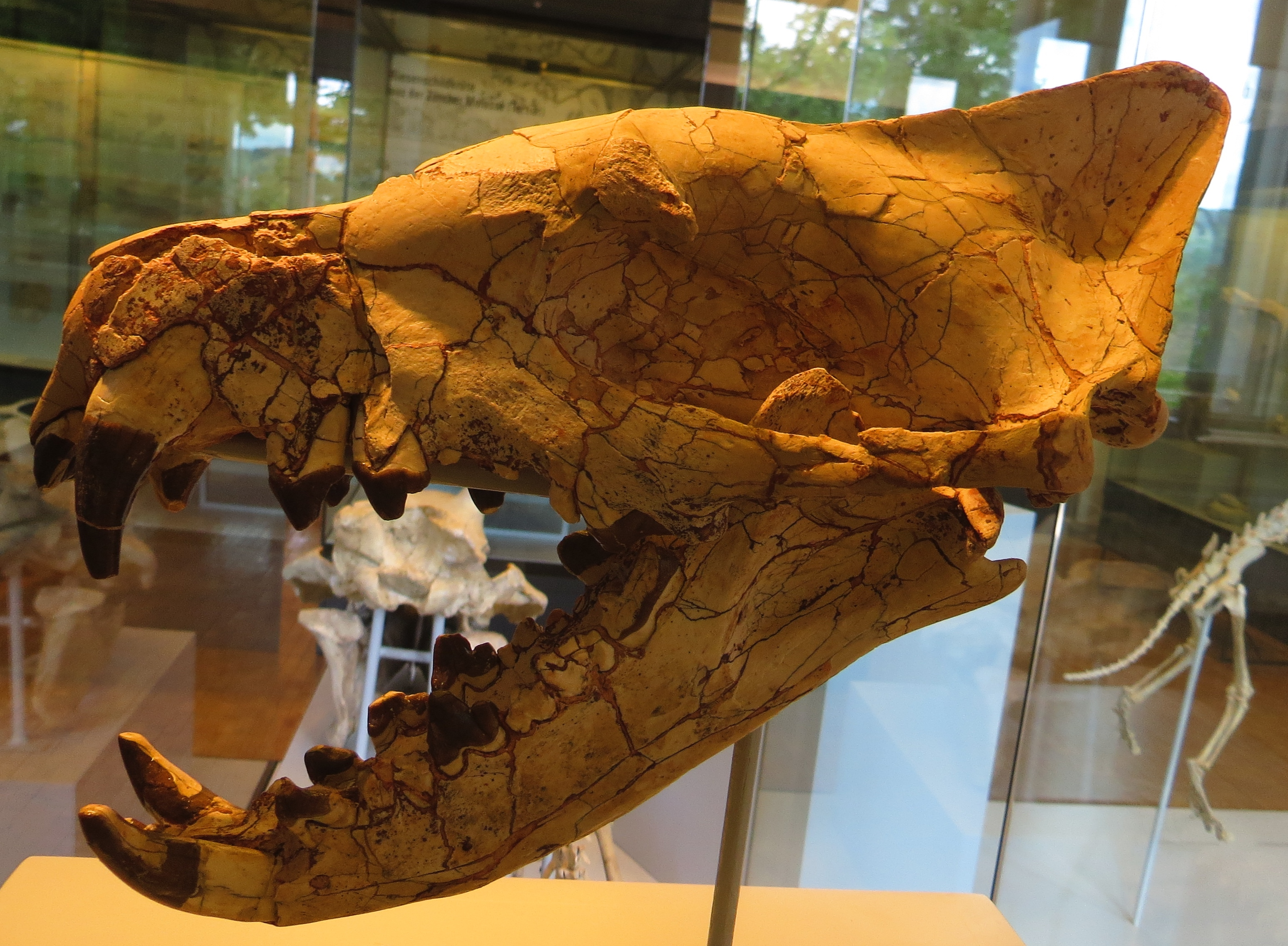
Skull of H. horridus

=== Size ===
The species within the genus vary in size, with most being small to medium-sized predators, while some were among the largest terrestrial carnivorous mammals of their time. Intraspecific dimorphism has also been reported in the genus, although its ecological significance is unclear. H. crucians, from the early Oligocene of North America, was estimated to have weighed around 10–25 kg (22–55 lb). H. microdon and H. mustelinus, from the late Eocene of North America, were even smaller and weighed probably about 5 kg (11 lb). Another tiny North American species, H. venturae, was similar in size to H. microdon. H. filholi was the smallest European species and among the smallest species within the genus, weighing 2 kg (4 lb 7 oz). H. leptorhynchus, the type species, was estimated to have weighed 11 kg (24 lb). H. lingaoensis is considered to be the smallest hyaenodont recovered in China and was noted to have been smaller than H. filholi.

H. horridus was one of the largest North American species with a skull length of 25–35 cm (9.8–13.8 in). Valkenburgh (1987) estimated a specimen with a skull length of 29 cm (11 in) had an estimated body length of 107.4 cm (3.52 ft) and weighed 93 kg (205 lb). Egi (2001) suggested based on regressions of limb morphology, an average adult weighed 41.42 kg (91 lb 5 oz) on average, with the largest adults weighing no more than 60 kg (130 lb). Christison et al. (2022) estimated that based on m1 regressions suggested it could have weighed 91.8 kg (202 lb 6 oz). However, skeletal measurements tend to give more consistent body mass estimates. H. megaloides was the largest North American species with a skull length of 40 cm (16 in). Body mass estimates have estimated the species was three times heavier than H. horridus, weighing 30–120 kg (66–265 lb), possibly even 165 kg (364 lb), making it about the size of a lion. It has been suggested that the size decrease among North American Hyaenodon species may have been the result of competition with nimravids.

In Europe, the largest species known species was H. geravisi, weighing 50 kg (110 lb). The largest Asian species, as well as the largest species within the genus, was H. gigas, followed by H. mongoliensis. Both species had a skull length of 60 cm (2 ft 0 in) and were thought to have been larger than lions, potentially rivaling Hyainailouros. H. weilini was another very large species, described to be similar in size to H. gigas and H. mongoliensis.

=== Postcranial remains ===
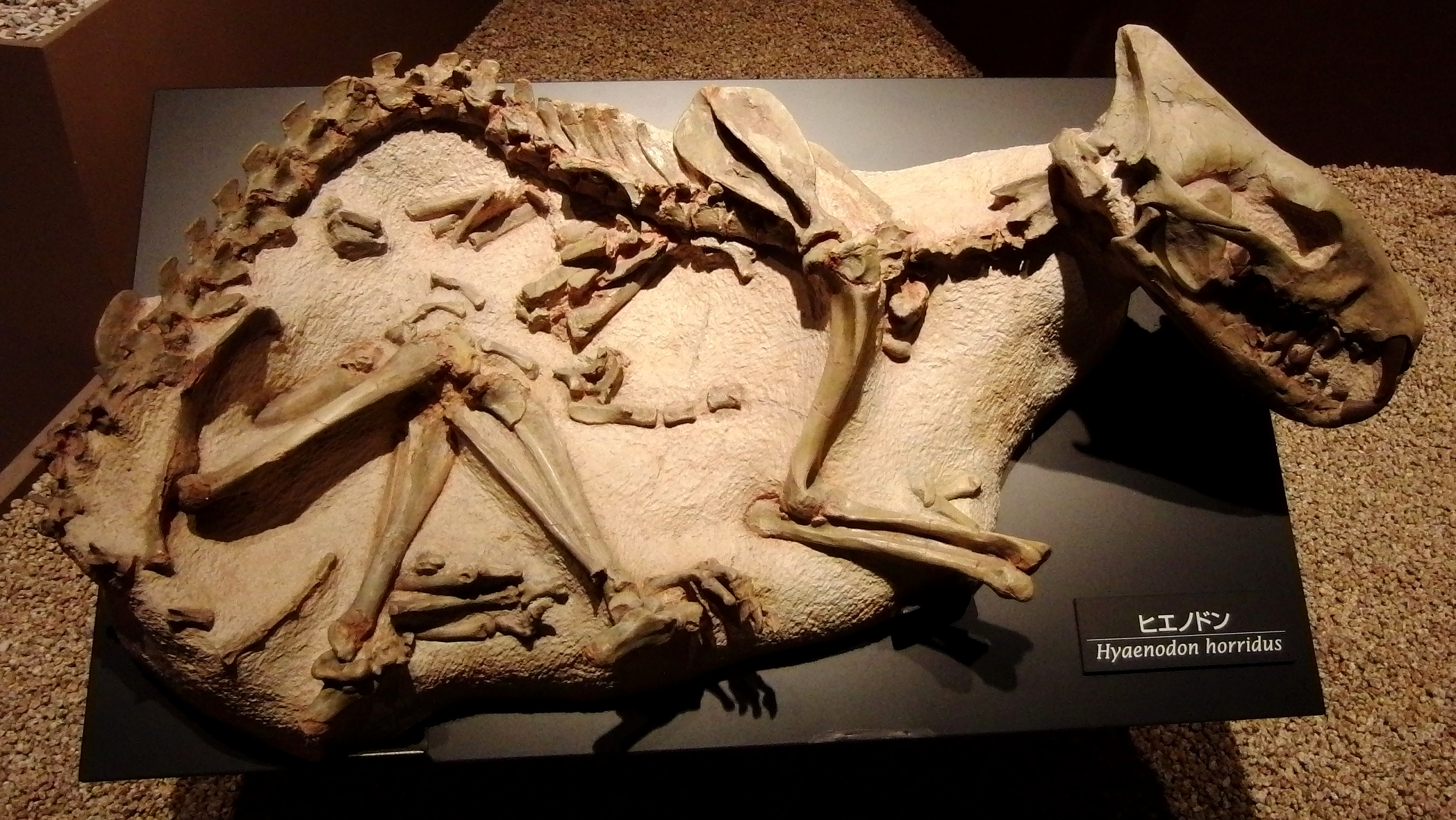
Skeleton of H. horridus

Postcranial remains have been recovered for Hyaenodon, although the fossil records within Eurasia are rather scarce compared to North America. While the neck of the animal was relatively short, the body and tail were long. Compared to Hyainailouros, the spine of Hyaenodon was longer and more robust, suggesting it didn't bore its head as low. Cervical vertebrae of Hyaenodon was more relatively short and resembled that of a felid than a canid.

The neural spines were prominent and was posterior projecting Hyaenodon in comparison to carnivorans. Within Hyaenodon, the transverse processes and neural spine of the thoracic vertebrae were larger and more robust than what is seen with carnivorans. The more developed spines would've supported a larger head with hypothetical nuchal ligament.

The femur of Hyaenodon was found to have been nearly as long as the humerus, which was short and massive, supporting a large, rounded head. Compared to carnivorans, the greater tuberosity has a more irregular shape and faces anteromedially. It would've been an insertion site for the infraspinatous muscles, which isn't seen in carnivorans. Despite this, the humerus of Hyaenodon was similar to that of wolves and hyenas. Compared to hyenas, it shows an anconeal fossa, a well-developed brachial flange and a similarly elongated trochlea shape. Despite this, the trochela shape of Hyaenodon is more similar in to the red fox.

Compared to wolves, the radius and ulna of Hyaenodon are rather short. The anatomy of the radius suggests it lost any possible rotatory capabilities. The shaft of the radius was not as flattened as seen in carnivorans, although within the cross section it was quadratic, with the distal part being heavy. The ulna had a relatively long olecranon, along with a heavy shaft and a deep channel that runs into the radical notch to the styloid process.

== Paleobiology ==
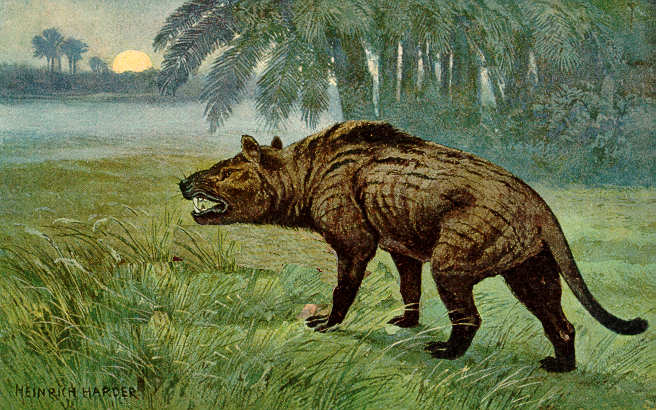
Reconstruction of Hyaenodon by Heinrich Harder (around 1920)

=== Predatory behavior ===
The canines of Hyaenodon were mediolaterally compressed, similar to canids, this was ideal for slashing bites. This suggests Hyaenodon landed shallow bites on potential prey and likely didn't perform the killing bite seen in felids. Hunter-Schreger bands observed in the tooth enamel of H. horridus are zigzag, suggesting that this species was osteophagous, whereas those of H. brevirostris and H. mustelinus transition from undulating at the base of the tooth to zigzag at the tip, indicating that these species were not as well adapted for feeding on bone. However, dental microwear patterns suggests that North American Hyaenodon had a diet more similar to lions, suggesting it ate mostly meat with various intakes of bone. On the other hand, European Hyaenodon microwear were more similar to that of spotted hyenas, suggesting bone cracking was likely a major part of their diet. The tooth wearing on P4 of H. gigas suggests the primary function of the tooth was for bone-cracking. Despite having adaptations towards bone consumption, compared to Hyainailouros, the dentition of Hyaenodon was geared more towards shearing meat and less towards bone crushing. A 2024 study found that canine bite mechanic efficiency increased with tooth macrowear in Hyaenodon.

=== Ontogeny ===
Studies on juvenile Hyaenodon specimens show that the animal had a very unusual system of tooth replacement. Juveniles took about 3–4 years to complete the final stage of eruption, implying a long adolescent phase. In North American forms, the first upper premolar erupts before the first upper molar, while European forms show an earlier eruption of the first upper molar.

=== Locomotion ===
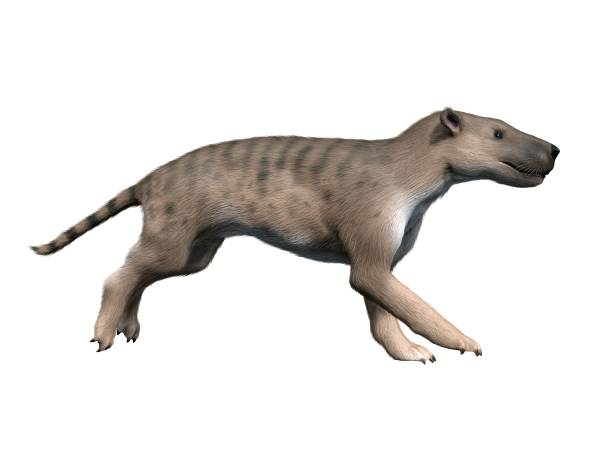
Life reconstruction of H. horridus

Initially, Hyaenodon was thought to have been a semi-plantigrade walker, however other experts considered it to have been a digitigrade. Due to the presence of relatively straight ungual phalanges, short phalanges, intermediate long metatarsals, cadually oriented olecranon, with a long olecranon, suggests Hyaenodon was a terrestrial animal. Andersson and Werdelin (2003) study found that based on elbow morphology H. horridus was a cursorial predator and was the most cursorially adapted Oligocene carnivore sampled within the study. Furthermore, a Castellanos (2025) found that based on elbow morphology found that H. crucians and H. horridus were pounce-pursuit predators. Morlo et al, (2010) recovered H. eminus, H. gigas, and H. pervagus as cursorial predators. Despite being a cursorial predator, Hyaenodon probably still tended to hunt within short distances. On the other hand, analysis on the bony labyrinth of H. exiguus suggests this species was semi-arboreal.

=== Brain anatomy and senses ===
While it has typically been assumed that Hyaenodon had a very massive skull, but a small brain, this has been called into question. Flink and colleagues found that Hyaenodon, had encephalization quotient of 0.36-0.37 and 0.42-0.46, for H. horridus and H. crucians respectively. This similar to basal and some modern carnivorans such as cougars, Hesperocyon gregarius, Hoplophoneus primaevus, and striped hyena and exceeding jaguars, Daphoenus, Hoplophoneus primaevus, and Eusmilus bidentatus. Their discovery found that hyaenodonts had relative brain sizes that overlapped with both extinct and extant carnivorans. The endocast of Hyaenodon stands out from other hyaenodontoids as they had relatively high EQ, in addition to relatively gyrencephalic and neocorticalized brains, however the cause of the increase in EQ for the genus is still unknown. Despite having neocorticalized brains compared to other hyaenodonts, the neocortex of Hyaenodon was only moderately folded.

The olfactory bulbs were found to have been large in Hyaenodon, suggesting smell was the primary method of finding prey. However, compared to Neogene carnivorans of similar size, Hyaenodon sense of smell wasn't as acute, which would've been disadvantageous in prey detection.

=== Social behavior ===
Due the small size of the neocortex, some experts proposed that Hyaenodon probably didn't hunt in packs. Further evidence to suggest it was a solitary predator was fossil evidence of defecation, as defecating on food was an indication of a solitary predator.

== Paleoecology ==
=== North America ===
During the early Paleogene, North America consisted of subtropical swampy, densely forested habitats which supported predators such as oxyaenids. However, during the Middle Eocene, these habitats were replaced by more temperate, open forests. Because of these environmental changes, hyaenodonts, amphicyonids, canids and nimravids would replace oxyaenids, mesonychians, and miacoids. Hyaenodon first appeared in North America during the Middle Eocene with the appearance of H. venturae, likely the result of immigration from Asia. The late Chadronian saw the appearance of hyaenodont-nimravid fauna, which began 37 Ma. The fauna saw an increase in average body size of mammalian carnivores, represented by large hyaenodonts such as Hemipsalodon grandis and H. megaloides.

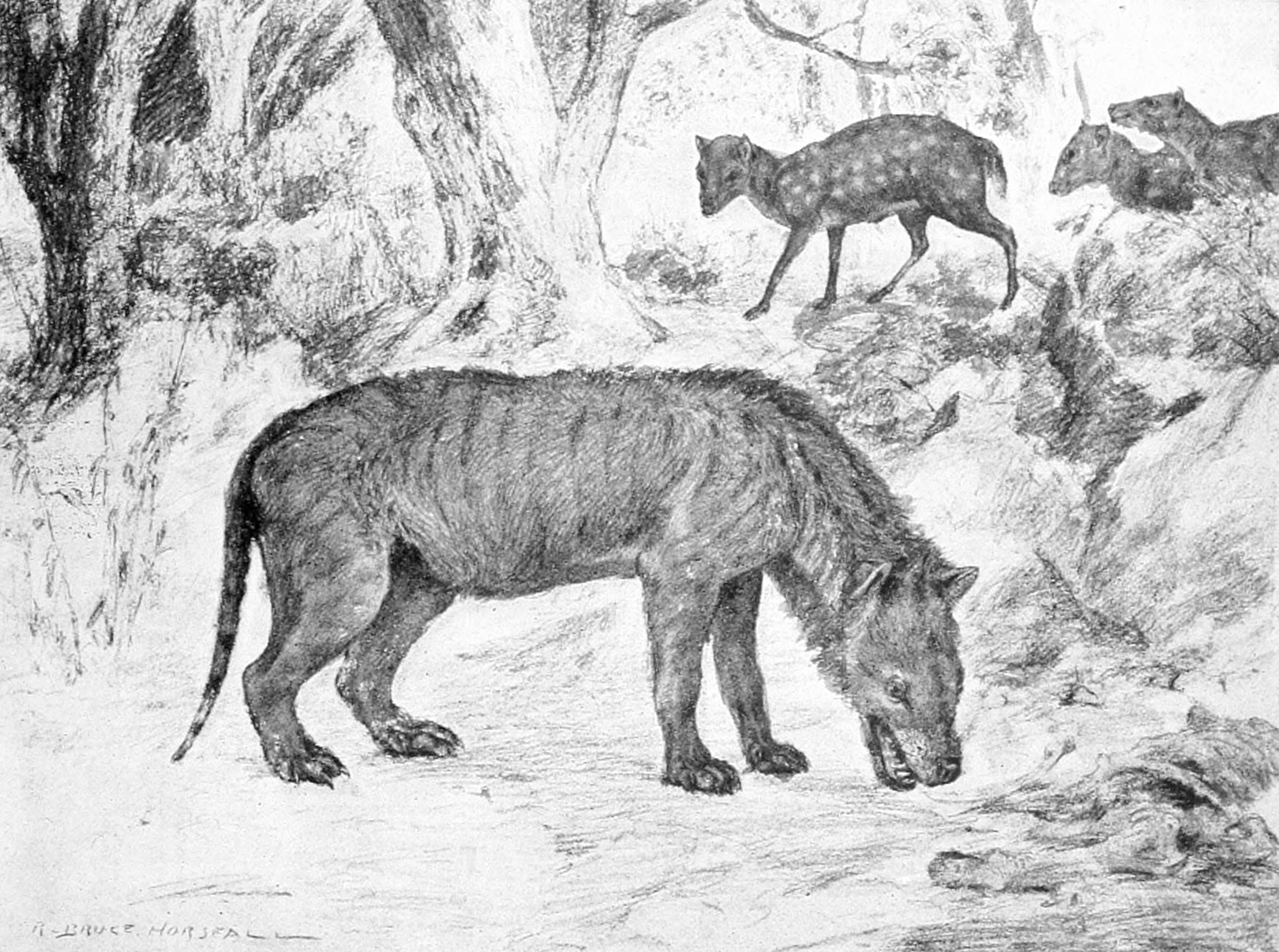
Reconstruction of H. horridus and Leptomeryx evansi by W. B. Scott (1913)

The most well known species, H. horridus, roamed North America from 36.5 to 31.4 Ma. This species was found in the Calf Creek locality of Cypress Hills Formation. The herpetofauna present within the locality suggests Calf Creek had a tropical or subtropical climate. In this locality, Hyaenodon coexisted with hyaenodonts such as H. microdon and the hyainailourid Hemipsalodon grandis. Carnivorans that were present in this formation were daphoeninae amphicyonids Brachyrhynchocyon dodgei and Daphoneus, nimravids Dinictis and Hoplophoneus, hesperocyonine canid Hesperocyon gregarius, and the subparictid Parictis. In addition, Hyaenodon also coexisted with the entelodont Archaeotherium. Herbivores present in this locality include the equid Mesohippus, the hyracodontid Hyracodon priscidens, rhinoceroses Subhyracodon occidentalis, Trigonias osborni, and Penetrigonias sagittatus, tapirid Colodon occidentalis, the brontothere Megacerops kuwagatarhinus, and the anthracothere Bothriodon advena.

The predators present in Calf Creek likely practiced niche partitioning via different body sizes, with H. horridus focusing on prey that weighed 166 kg (366 lb) and faced little competition from carnivorans. While Hoplophoneus could've induced some competition pressure via pack hunting, H. horridus could still hunt prey outside of the most probable range of the carnivoran. On the other hand, H. microdon was thought to have faced intense competition from five contemporary carnivorans.

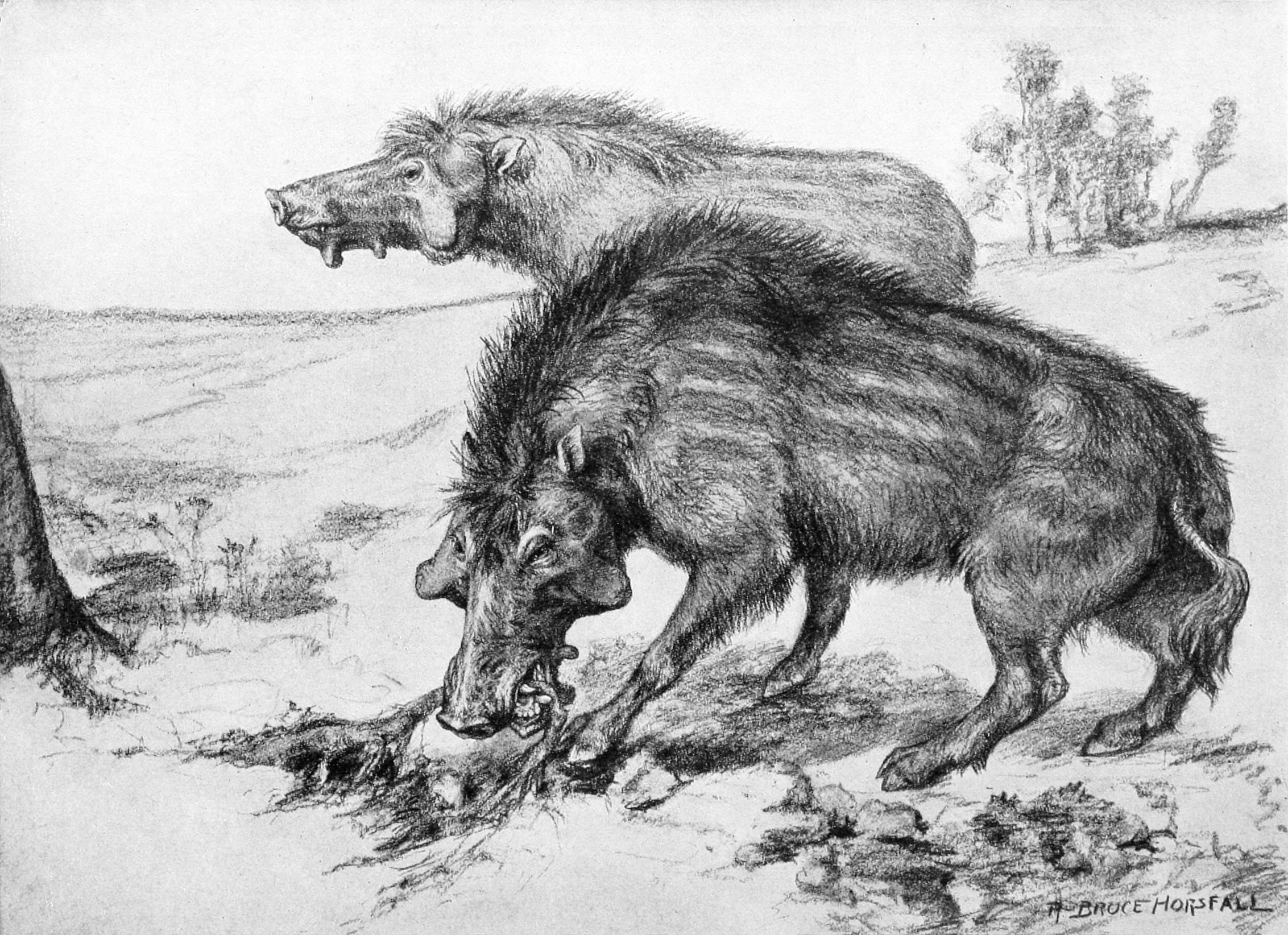
Restoration of Archaeotherium eating roots. Several species of both taxa were contemporary with each other across North America.

H. horridus was also found in Brule Formation of South Dakota. The paleoenvironment of Brule Formation was believed to have been a woodland grassland and gallery forest, populated in part by hackberry trees (Celtis). Contemporary predators would've included fellow species H. crucians, the nimravid Hoplophoneus, the amphicyonid Daphoneus, and the entelodont Archaeotherium mortoni. Herbivores present include the early horse Mesohippus, hypertragulid Hypertragulus calcaratus, leptomerycid Leptomeryx evansi, tapirs such as Protapirus simplex and Colodon occidentalis, the camel Poebrotherium wilsoni, anthracotheres Aepinacodon americanus and Heptacodon occidentale, oreodonts Merycoidodon culbertsonii and Miniochoerus affinis.

Fossil evidence suggests that H. horridus could've predate on other predators such as Dinictis and juvenile Archaeotherium. Despite being one of the top predators, it still probably lost its kills to an adult Archaeotherium.

=== Europe ===
==== Pre-Grand Coupure ====
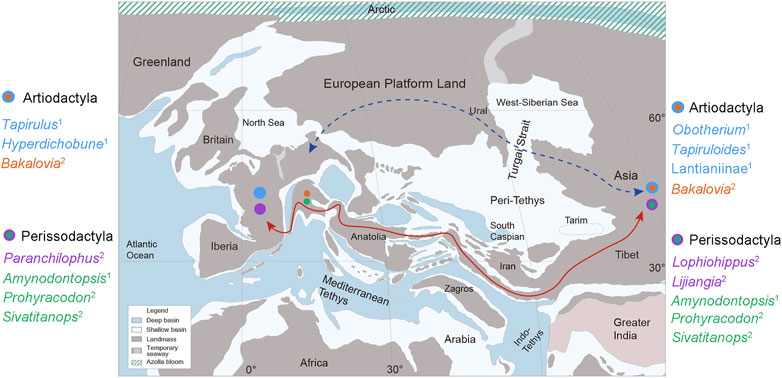
Palaeogeography of Europe and Asia during the middle Eocene with possible artiodactyl and perissodactyl dispersal routes.

From the early to middle Eocene, the climate of Europe was warm and humid, hosting tropical to subtropical closed forests. However, from MP17b to the end of the Eocene, the climate started to become more arid, turning forests into wooded savannas. Multiple groups of mammalian predators present on the continent include mesonychids, oxyaenids, hyaenodonts, and carnivoramorphans. The end of the Early Eocene Climatic Optimum resulted in the extinction of European mesonychids, oxyaenids, and viverravids. This likely led to the diversification of hyaenodonts at the Ypresian-Lutetian boundary, resulting in them becoming the dominant group of predators in Europe.

During the Bartonian and Priabonian stage, there was major restructuring of the predator guild, which marked the end of endemism. The restructuring was marked by the appearance of hyaenodontines, hyainailourines, and amphicyonids. Hyaenodon first appears in the fossil records around MP17a of the Bartonian stage of the Eocene marked by the appearance of H. brachyrhynchus, H. minor, and H. requieni. Their appearance was likely the result of Hyaenodon migrating into Europe from Asia.

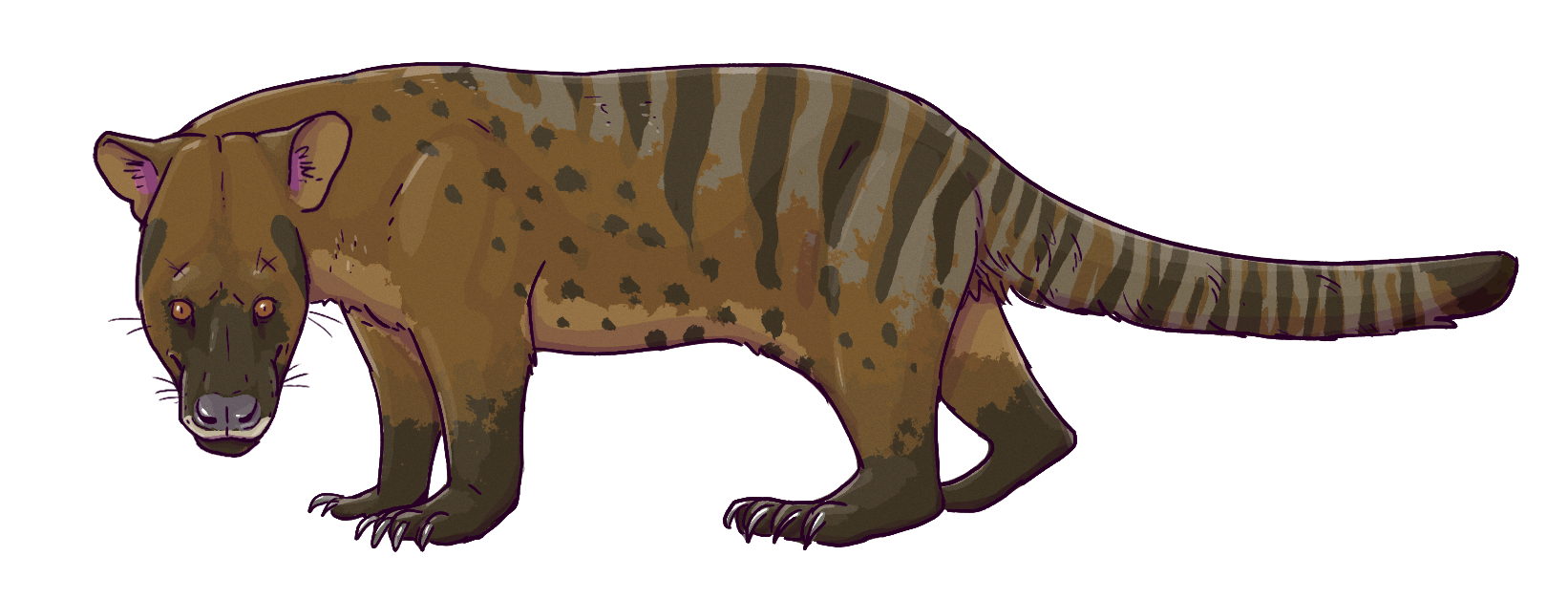
Reconstruction of Pterodon dasyuroides, a hyainailourine that was found in Western Europe and coexisted with Hyaenodon requieni. The appearance of hyainailourines, hyaenodontines, and amphicyonids represented a major restructuring of the carnivore guild.

H. requieni was found in La Debruge of France. Mammalian predators present in this locality other than H. requieni included the hyainailourine Pterodon dasyuroides and the amphicyonine Cynodictis lacustris. Contemporary herbivores include perissodactyls (palaeotheres), endemic (amphimerycids, Anoplotheriidae, choeropotamids, and xiphodontids) and non-endemic artiodactyls (dichobunides, tapirulids, and anthracotheres). Other mammalian fauna includes primates (adapids and omomyids), rodents (ischyromyids, theridomyids, and glirids), soricomorphs (nyctitheriids), and tribosphenidans (Herpetotheriidae).

==== Grand Coupure ====
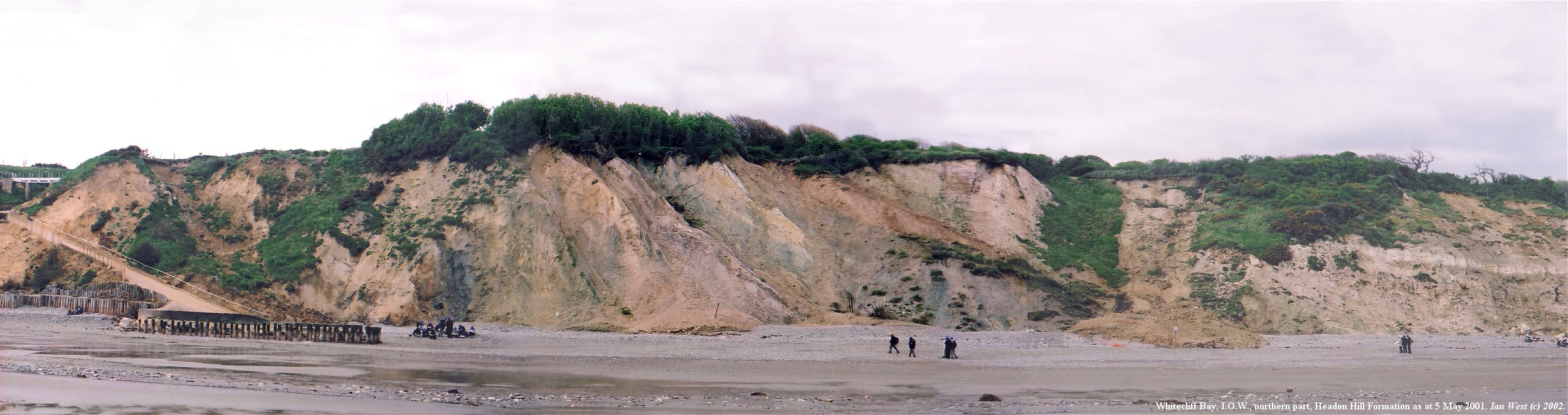
A panorama of the Headon Hill Formation in the Isle of Wight, from which Anoplotherium material has been collected. The stratigraphy of it and the Bouldnor Formation led to better understandings of faunal chronologies from the Late Eocene up to the Grande Coupure.

The boundary of the Eocene and Oligocene in Europe was marked by the Grand Coupure (MP20-MP21), which saw a transition from subhumid to cooler, semi-arid seasons, resulting in the reduction of forests, swamps, and mangroves. In Western Europe, the boundary is marked by the spread of conifers and temperate woodlands, and even savannas in some areas. The change in European flora suggests marked seasonality and open environments replacing forests. The massive drop in temperature stemmed from the first major expansion of the Antarctic ice sheets that caused drastic pCO_{2} decreases and an estimated drop of ~70 m (230 ft) in sea level.

During the Grand Coupure, the extinction rate of western European mammalian lineages increased to 60%. The turnover saw the extinction of frugivorous/folivorous families of endemic artiodactyls such as xiphodontids and choeropotamids, as well as the extinction of several hyaenodonts including H. requini and the hyainailourines. The Grande Coupure event also marked a large faunal turnover would mark the arrivals of later anthracotheres, entelodonts, ruminants (Gelocidae, Lophiomerycidae), rhinocerotoids (Rhinocerotidae, Amynodontidae, Eggysodontidae), carnivorans (later Amphicyonidae, Amphicynodontidae, Nimravidae, and Ursidae), eastern Eurasian rodents (Eomyidae, Cricetidae, and Castoridae), and eulipotyphlans (Erinaceidae). The arrivals of these animals was likely the result of the Turgai Strait receding, as well as the connection of Balkanatolia and Western Europe. The faunal turnover also marked the shift in dominance among predators, from hyaenodonts to carnivorans. However the transition was gradual as newcomers didn't appear in Europe until MP21, while proviverrines and endemic carnivoraforms disappeared between MP18-MP20.

==== Post-Grand Coupure ====
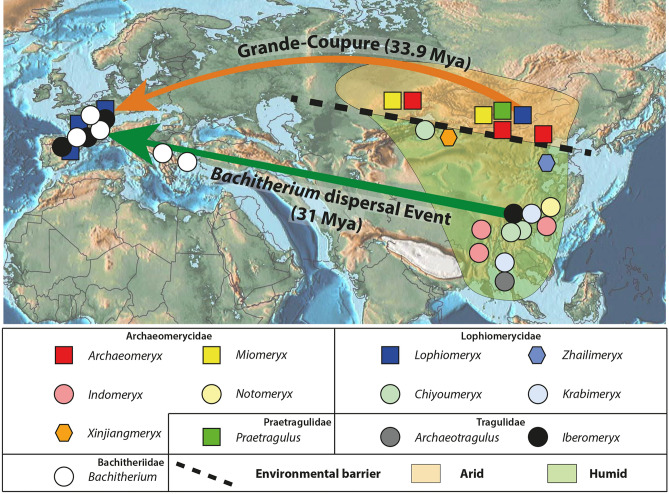
Palaeobiogeography of eastern Eurasian ruminants during the late Eocene-early Oligocene with dispersal routes to western Europe during the Grande Coupure (33.9 Ma) and Bachitherium Dispersal Event (31 Ma).

The Rupelian stage corresponds with the peak floral changes that started in the Late Eocene. Despite seeing the extinction of some paleotropical elements and dispersal of deciduous trees, there was still evidence of warm Mediterranean to subtropical paleoenvironments. However, for most of Europe, there were arid conditions with relatively low mean annual temperatures, which is associated with (sub)desert to lightly forested habitats. Two million years after the Grand Coupure, the Bachitherium Dispersal Event saw some of the earliest ruminants in Europe.

The end of the Rupelian (MP25), saw the extinction of the nimravids, as well as the reduction in diversity among other mammalian groups such as rodents, likely the result of the increased aridity. H. geravisi and H. leptorhynchus were found in Séon Saint-André, which was dated to MP26. The carnivorans present in this locality were amphicyonids Cynelos rugosidens and Pseudocyonopsis ambiguus. All predators within this locality are believed to have practiced some niche partitioning. H. leptorhynchus is believed to have hunted small artiodactyls such as Bachitherium and Mosaicomeryx. However the larger predators would've hunted larger artiodactyls such as Anthracotherium cuvieri and Elomeryx borbonicus and perissodactyls such as Protaceratherium albigense and Ronzotherium romani. H. geravisi and Pseudocyonopsis were believed to competed for the same prey due to being similar in size to one another. Although, it is likely they niche partitioned as Hyaenodon likely preferred forested environments compared to amphicyonids, who preferred open environments.

The end of the Oligocene was marked by increased seasonality, characterized by a dry season and open environments. However, some experts found closed forests and temperate to subtropical climates still prevailed in Europe, although the humidity wasn't as high as the Priabonian. The contradictions would suggest that Europe supported mosaic environments during the late stages of the Oligocene. Around MP28, the Microbunodon Event saw the ruminants transition from wooded environments to more open environments, which was likely the result of the Late Oligocene Warming and Alpine orogeny. MP27 to MP29 also saw the appearance of many caniforms such as mustelids and ailurids, and large amphicyonids. The appearance of large amphicyonids, such as Ysengrinia, suggests that Western Europe was a wooded savanna and environments were becoming more open.

=== Asia ===
The largest species, H. gigas and H. mongoliensis, lived from Late Eocene to Early Oligocene. Both species was found within the Khoer-Dzan locality of the Ergilin Dzo Formation. Based on the presence of brontotheres and the abundance of low crowned herbivores, it was initially thought that the climate was humid and it was warm, with the environment thought to have been relatively closed. However, the absence of primates and the rarity of crocodyliforms suggests the formation had some open areas and was more arid than contemporary formations across Eurasia. Sedimentary analysis of Khoer-Dzan found the presence of root traces which suggests red soils, which is associated with floodplain environments, with no evidence of lacustrine environments.

Within this locality, H. gigas and H. mongoliensis coexisted with other predators like hyaenodonts H. eminus, H. incertus, and H. pervagus, nimravids Eofelis and Nimravus intermedius, and entelodonts Brachyhyops trofimovi and Entelodon gobiensis. Contemporary herbivores include the anthracothere Bothriodon, the praetragulid Praetragulus electus, the brontothere Embolotherium andrewsi, the chalicothere Schizotherium avitum, and rhinocerotoids such as the paracerathere Urtinotherium parvum and rhinocerotid Ronzotherium orientale.

== Extinction ==
From the middle to late Eocene, hyaenodonts experienced a decline in diversity with only one genus, consisting of a few species by the end of the Eocene in North America. With H. brevirostrus being the last species in North America, which disappeared in the 28.3 Ma. In Europe, the last species to go extinct, H. exiguus and H. leptorhynchus, were last known in MP30 of the late Oligocene. One of the youngest species, H. weilini, lived during the Early Miocene of China, going extinct 17 Ma. The youngest known Hyaenodon was cf. H. pervagus from the Chinji Formation of Pakistan. With remains of the species ranging from the late Middle Miocene to earliest Late Miocene, from 13.1-11.4 Ma.

The cause of their extinction has been debated by experts. Some experts argued due to the anatomy of the neocortex, Hyaenodon lacked the mental capacity to adjust to the changing environment and prey evolving larger brains. However, this has been contested as the degree of folding doesn't automatically apply to intelligence. However, many argued that their extinction was due to competition with carnivorans, such as amphicyonids, hesperocyonines, hemicyonines, and hyenas. Lang and colleagues theorize that the success of carnivorans compared to hyaenodonts was likely due to the retention of a basal morphotype throughout their evolutionary history. They also suggested that carnivorans possibly played a role in the extinction of hyaenodonts, probably due to the adaptive potential of their carnassials.

Friscia and Valkenburgh argued that while "creodonts" didn't limit the evolution of carnivorans in North America, carnivorans may have limited the ecological evolution of creodonts, with the large hypercarnivorous ecomorphs being the "last stand" of the order. Serio and colleagues found that North American creodonts had a significant degree of morphological differentiation until the middle Eocene, with disparity among carnivorans increasing around the same time. The authors also argue that carnivoran disparity may have negatively impacted the disparity of creodonts, supporting the hypothesis that carnivorans competitively replaced the hyaenodonts.

However, competitive replacement in North America has been questioned by many experts, arguing their extinction correlated with abiotic changes in their environments. Christison and colleagues found that only small hyaenodont, H. microdon, experienced significant competition with the five contemporary carnivorans. The largest hyaenodonts such as H. horridus and Hemipsalodon, didn't experience little to no competition from carnivorans. This suggests competition with carnivorans couldn't have been the driver of the extinction of North American hyaenodonts in the Late Eocene. Instead, they argued the highly specialized niche of hyaenodonts enhanced their extinction rates. The global cooling of the early Oligocene resulted in the extinction of large browsers such as brontotheres, as ecosystems became drier and more open. Brontotheres were replaced by equids and rhinoceroses, who were better adapted for open environments. But rhinoceroses wouldn't reach large sizes until the Miocene epoch, leaving the gap of accessible large herbivores for the large, hypercarnivorous hyaenodonts. Furthermore, hyaenodonts tend to have relatively short legs, which may have been a disadvantage in open environments and likely played a role in their extinction. Castellanos, in their 2025 paper, found that despite hyaenodonts showing adaptations towards cursoriality, because of their short distal limbs, hyaenodonts couldn't exploit open environments as well as amphicyonids, which may have resulted in their extinction and in addition to the low diversity of the clade by the start of the Oligocene.

There was also no evidence of carnivorans competitively displacing hyaenodonts in Europe as hyaenodonts were more diverse than carnivorans up until the Grand Coupure. Additionally, the body mass dynamics of European hyaenodonts and carnivoramorphans found hyaenodonts didn't experience a decrease in body mass when the body mass of carnivoramorphans increased suggesting a notable niche partition between the two clades. During the Oligocene, Hyaenodon and amphicyonids preferred different environments, with the former presumably hunting in more forested environments which would've limited competition between the two predators, suggesting climatic changes were responsible for their extinction. MP30 and MN1 saw an increase in aridity, and was associated with a cooler climate. It saw the extinction of other groups of mammals such as Theridomorpha. Despite being recovered as a cursorial predator, European Hyaenodon went extinct because of the expansion of open environments as it reduced the access to resources.
