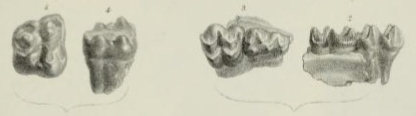
- Garobunodon silistrensis fossil material collected by Pentland

Scientific classification
- Kingdom: Animalia
- Phylum: Chordata
- Class: Mammalia
- Infraclass: Placentalia
- Order: Artiodactyla
- Family: †Anthracotheriidae
- Subfamily: †Microbunodontinae
- Genus: †Garobunodon; Pickford, 2026

Type species
- †"Anthracotherium" silistrensis (Pentland, 1828)

Species
- Garobunodon silistrensis (Pentland, 1828); Garobunodon punjabiensis (Lydekker, 1877); Garobunodon exiguus (Forster-Cooper, 1924)

Synonyms
- Anthracotherium punjabiense Lydekker, 1877; Anthracotherium mus Pilgrim, 1908; Microselenodon silistrensis Pilgrim, 1912; Microselenodon mus Pilgrim, 1912; Microbunodon mus Pilgrim, 1913; Anthracotherium exiguum Forster-Cooper, 1984; Microbunodon silistrensis Lihoreau et al. 2004; Microbunodon milaensis Lihoreau et al. 2004

= Garobunodon =

Garobunodon Temporal range: Middle to Late Miocene, ~12–9.5 Ma

Genus of extinct mammal

Garobunodon (lit. 'Garo Hills mound tooth') is an extinct genus of anthracothere that lived during Middle to Late Miocene in what is now India and Pakistan. It is known from several mandibular remains. There are three known species within the genus. The type species is Garobunodon silistrensis, which was originally described as a species of Anthracotherium in 1828, before being moved to its own genus by Martin Pickford in 2026.

== Discovery and naming ==
In 1828, J. B. Pentland reported fossils from Caribari in the small state of Cooch Behar of North-Eastern border Bengal near the banks of the Brahmaputra river. These included several other mammal bones, including ruminant fossils of the order Pachydermata and the genus Moschus, a molar that can be referred to Viverra, and an additional molar and partial dentary. He described the latter remains as a new species of Anthracotherium, Anthracotherium silistrense, where the specific name, silistrense, is derived from one of the many names of the river Brahmaputra, which ancient geographers used.
