= Doliochoerus =

Doliochoerus Temporal range: Oligocene

Scientific classification
- Kingdom: Animalia
- Phylum: Chordata
- Class: Mammalia
- Infraclass: Placentalia
- Order: Artiodactyla
- Genus: †Doliochoerus
- Species: †D. quercyi

Binomial name
- †Doliochoerus quercyi Filhol, 1882

Extinct genus of artiodactyl

Doliochoerus is an extinct genus of suoid ungulate that lived in Western Europe during the Oligocene epoch.

== Description ==
The body masses of Doliochoerus quercyi specimens from Garouillas and Pech Desse in France have been estimated as 20 kg and 26 kg, respectively. Remains of Doliochoerus not diagnostic to the species level from Pech Desse indicate it could have weighed up to 50 kg.

== Extinction ==
Doliochoerus disappeared from Europe at the terminus of the Oligocene, together with Anthracotherium magnum and Microbunodon minimus.
