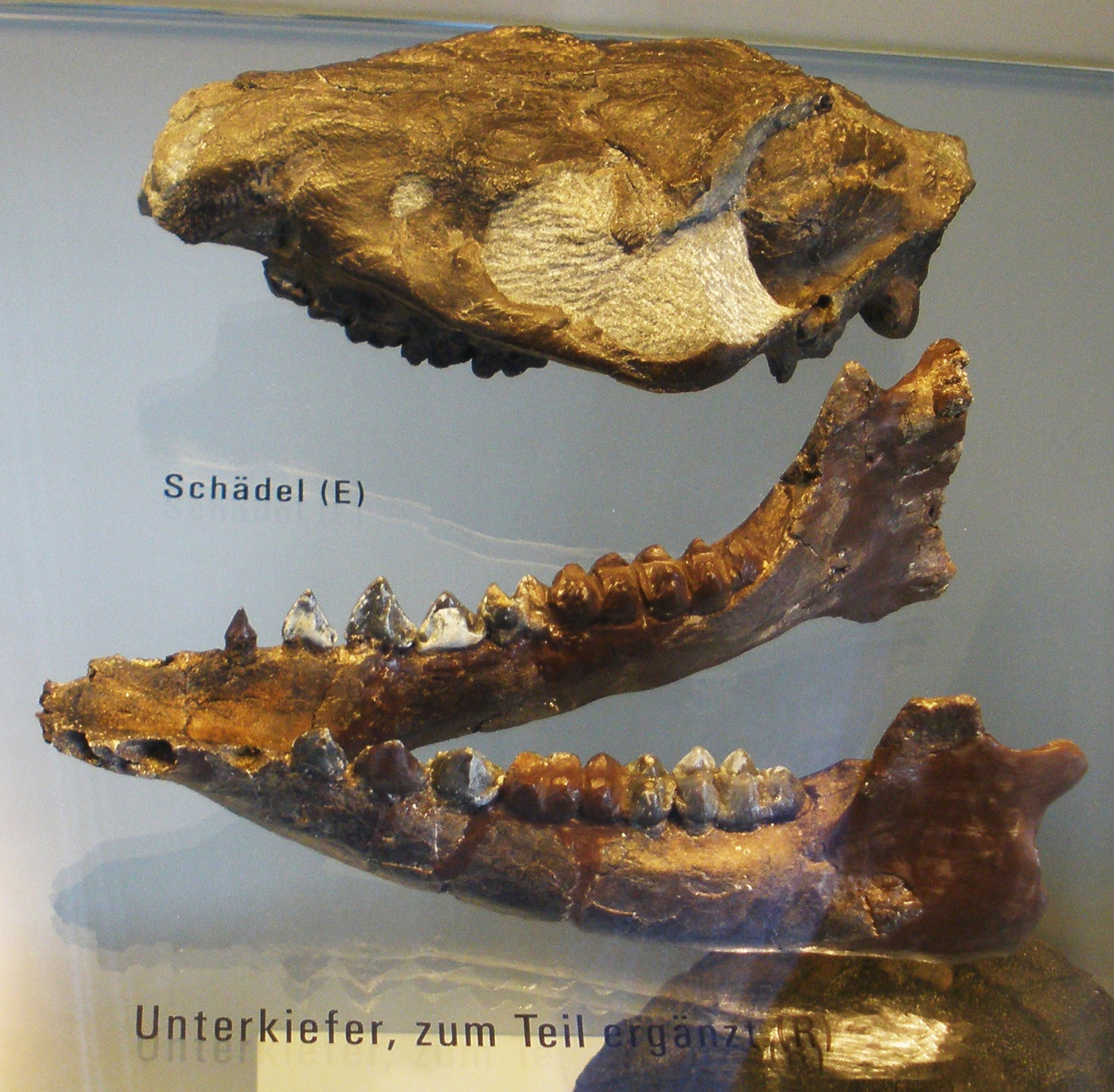
- Skull and jaws of Microbunodon

Scientific classification
- Kingdom: Animalia
- Phylum: Chordata
- Class: Mammalia
- Infraclass: Placentalia
- Order: Artiodactyla
- Superfamily: Hippopotamoidea
- Family: †Anthracotheriidae
- Subfamily: †Microbunodontinae; Lihoreau & Ducrocq, 2007

Genera
- †Anthracokeryx; †Etruscotherium?; †Garobunodon; †Geniokeryx; †Microbunodon; †Oligokeryx

= Microbunodontinae =

Microbunodontinae Temporal range: Middle Eocene–Late Miocene

Extinct subfamily of mammals

The microbunodontines were an extinct subfamily of anthracotheres that were predominately a Paleogene group of Eurasian artiodactyls. The group died out at the end of the Late Miocene. They differ from the other anthracothere lineages by their smaller size, more slender limbs, and male specimens having laterally compressed, longer canines. They were originally classified as members of the other subfamily of anthracotheres, Anthracotheriinae, but recent phylogenetic studies have found them to be their own clade, which is sister to Bothriodontinae.
