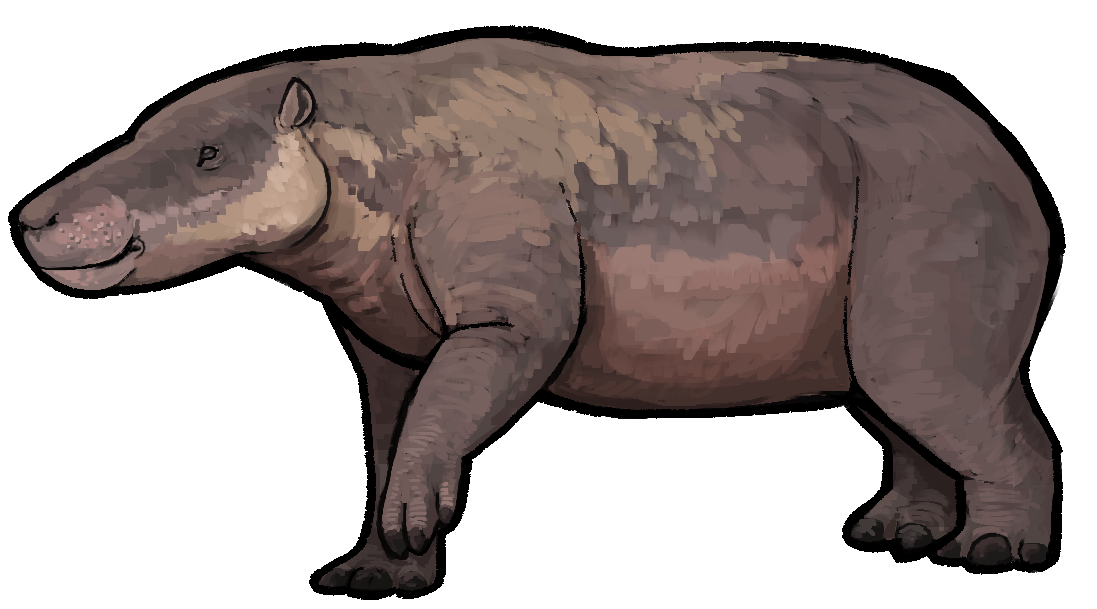
- Life restoration of "P. bergeri"

Scientific classification
- Kingdom: Animalia
- Phylum: Chordata
- Class: Mammalia
- Order: Artiodactyla
- Family: †Anthracotheriidae
- Subfamily: †Anthracotheriinae
- Genus: †Paenanthracotherium; Rutimeyer, 1857

Species
- †P. bergeri Scherler, Lihoreau & Becker, 2018 (type); †P. hippoideum (Rutimeyer, 1857); †P. strategus (Forster-Cooper, 1913)

= Paenanthracotherium =

Paenanthracotherium Temporal range: Oligocene

Extinct genus of hippopotamus-like animals

Paenanthracotherium is an extinct genus of anthracothere that lived in Europe and Asia during the Oligocene epoch.

== Taxonomy ==
The type species of the genus is Paenanthracotherium bergeri. The species "Anthracotherium" hippoideum and "Brachyodus" strategus have been reassigned to this genus based on similarities with P. bergeri.

== Distribution ==
Fossils of Paenanthracotherium are known from France, Germany, Pakistan, Romania, and Switzerland.

== Palaeobiology ==
=== Palaeoecology ===
The microanatomy of its long bones suggests that P. bergeri was fully terrestrial.
