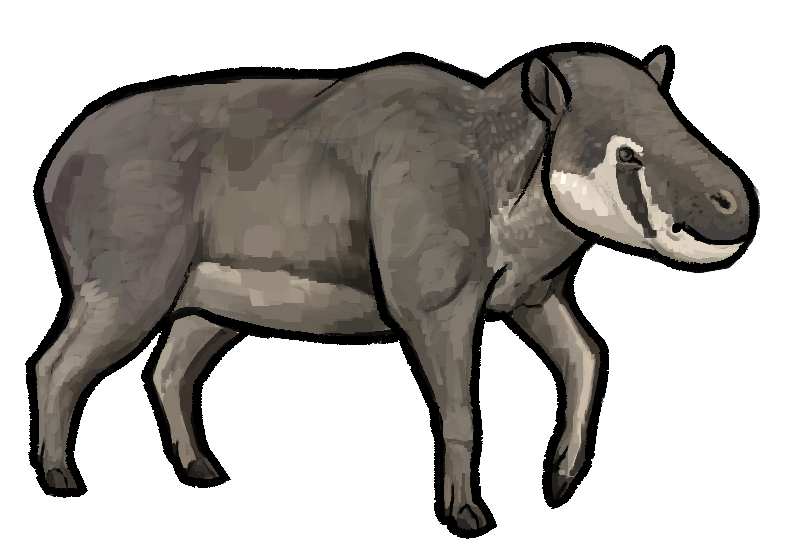
- Life restoration

Scientific classification
- Kingdom: Animalia
- Phylum: Chordata
- Class: Mammalia
- Order: Artiodactyla
- Family: †Anthracotheriidae
- Subfamily: †Anthracotheriinae
- Genus: †Heptacodon; Marsh, 1894

Type species
- †Heptacodon curtus Marsh, 1894

Species
- †H. curtus Marsh, 1894a; †H. gibbiceps Marsh, 1894c; †H. occidentalis (Osborn & Wortman, 1894); †H. pellionis Storer, 1983; †H. yeguaensis Holroyd, 2002

Synonyms
- Genus synonymy: Anthracotherium (in part); Octacodon Marsh, 1894b; H. curtus synonymy: Anthracotherium curtum (Marsh, 1894a) sensu Matthew, 1899; Anthracotherium karense Osborn & Wortman, 1894; Octacodon karense (Osborn & Wortman, 1894) sensu Troxell, 1921; Octacodon valens Marsh, 1894b; H. gibbiceps synonymy: Anthracotherium gibbiceps (Marsh, 1894c) sensu Matthew, 1899; Octacodon gibbiceps (Marsh, 1894c) sensu Troxell, 1921; H. occidentalis synonymy: Anthracotherium curtum (in part) (Marsh, 1894a) sensu Osborn & Wortman, 1894; Anthracotherium occidentale Osborn & Wortman, 1894; Octacodon gibbiceps (in part) (Marsh, 1894c) sensu Troxell, 1921; Heptacodon quadratus Scott, 1940

= Heptacodon =

Heptacodon Temporal range: Middle Eocene–Early Oligocene

Extinct genus of mammals

Heptacodon is an extinct genus of anthracothere endemic to North America during the Paleogene (from the middle Eocene to the early Oligocene). They were medium to large-sized anthracotheres with distinct facial features, such as short heavy rostrums and robust but simple molars. Heptacodon is a member of the anthracothere subfamily Anthracotheriinae, whose distribution as a whole included North America and Eurasia. However Heptacodon has only been found in North America, with the species H. yeguaensis from Texas representing the oldest known anthracotheres to be found in North America dating to the middle Eocene. Fossils of this genus have been found in the states of North Dakota, Oregon, South Dakota, Texas, and Utah.
