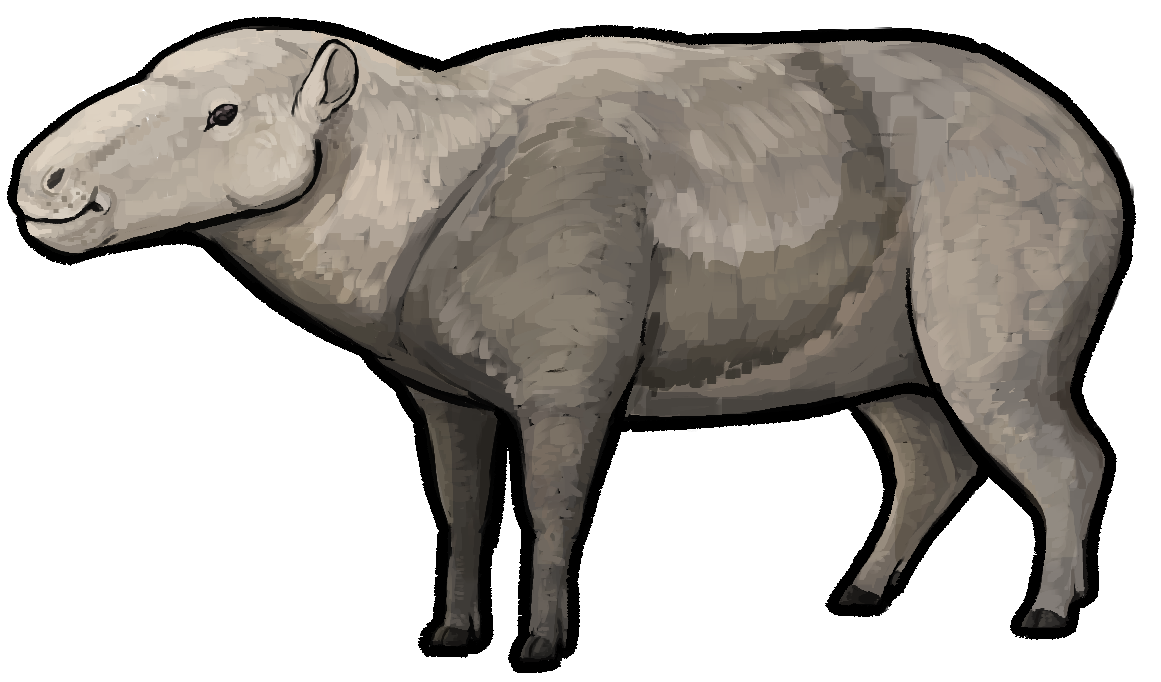
- Life Restoration

Scientific classification
- Kingdom: Animalia
- Phylum: Chordata
- Class: Mammalia
- Order: Artiodactyla
- Family: †Anthracotheriidae
- Subfamily: †Bothriodontinae
- Genus: †Bothriogenys; Schmidt, 1913

Species
- †B. fraasi Schmidt, 1913 (type); †B. andrewsi Schmidt, 1913; †B. gorringei (Andrews & Beadnell, 1902); †B. rugulosus Schmidt, 1913; †B. orientalis Ducrocq, 1997

= Bothriogenys =

Bothriogenys Temporal range: late Eocene to Early Oligocene

Extinct genus of mammals

Bothriogenys is a genus of anthracotheres that lived in Eastern Africa during the Late Eocene to Early Oligocene.

== Distribution ==
Most fossils have been found in Fayum, Egypt, but one species, B. orientalis, is known from Late Eocene deposits in Thailand. It is believed to have originated from the Asian genus Anthracokeryx. Bothriogenys is believed to be one of the first anthracotheriids to have entered Africa.

== Description ==
In life, they would have resembled hippopotamuses with small, elongated heads.

== Palaeobiology ==
=== Growth and development ===
The deciduous premolars in the mandible of B. fraasi were retained all the way until the third mandibular molar began developing in the crypt, in contrast to the modern hippopotamus that sheds all deciduous premolars by the time its M_{3} develops in the crypt.
