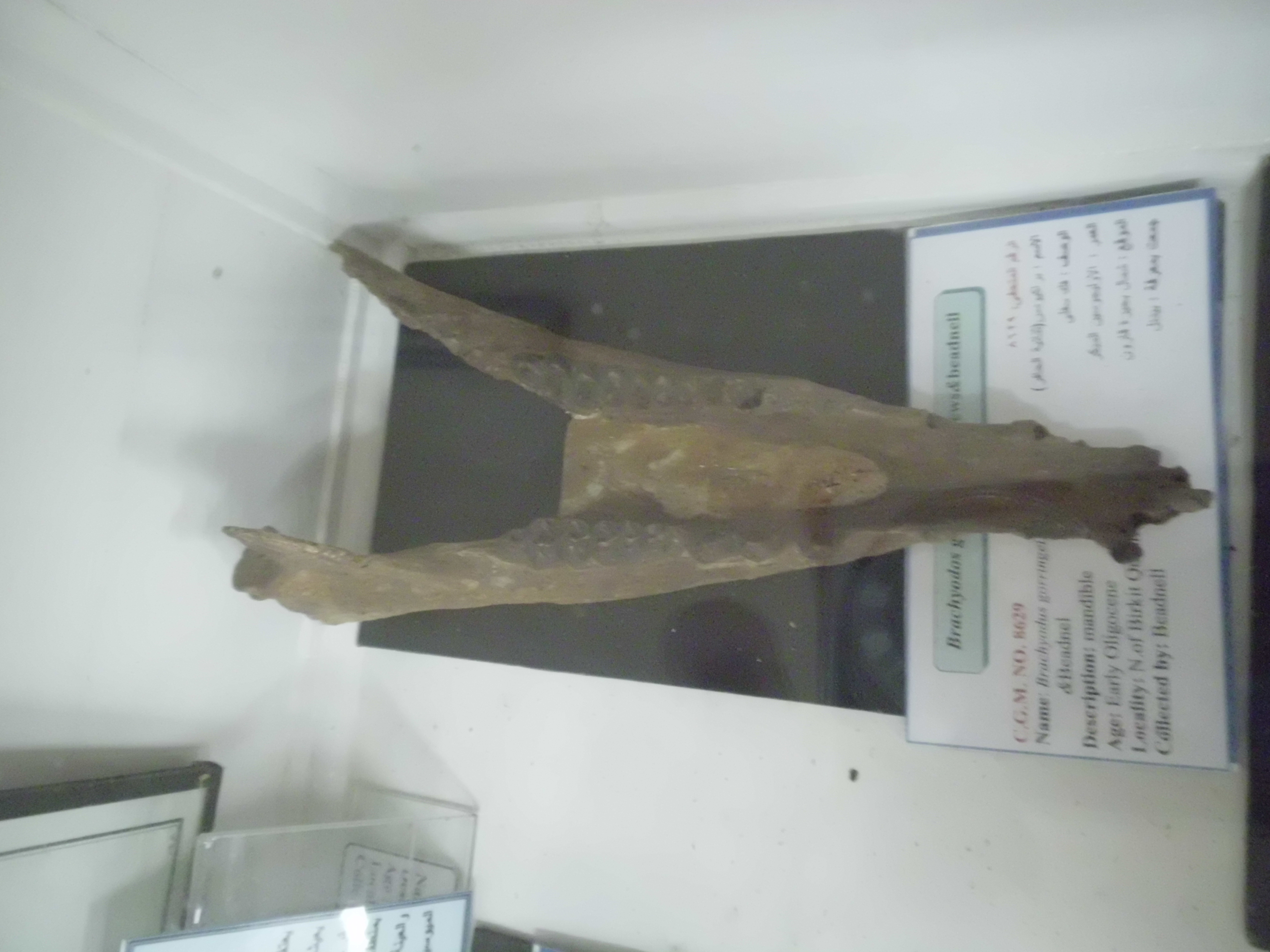
- jaw bone fossil

Scientific classification
- Kingdom: Animalia
- Phylum: Chordata
- Class: Mammalia
- Infraclass: Placentalia
- Order: Artiodactyla
- Family: †Anthracotheriidae
- Genus: †Brachyodus

Species
- †B. aequatorialis nacholaensis (Tsubamoto, 2025); †B. nancrayensis (Pickford, 2025); †B. onoideus (Gervais, 1859) (type); †B. pontigneensis (Pickford, 2025)

= Brachyodus =

Brachyodus Temporal range: Early Miocene

Extinct genus of mammals

Brachyodus was a genus of anthracothere that lived in Europe during the Early Miocene.

== Taxonomy ==
The type and only species of this genus is B. onoideus. The nominal species "Brachyodus" strategus has been reassigned to Paenanthracotherium based on similarities with P. bergeri. Likewise, the putative Asian species "B." japonicus was referred to Elomeryx by Tsubamoto and Kohno (2011).

== Distribution ==
Fossils of Brachyodus are known from latest early Miocene deposits in Europe. It has also been reported from the late Burdigalian fossil site of Tagay, located on Olkhon Island in Lake Baikal.

== Palaeobiology ==
=== Palaeoecology ===
The microanatomy of its long bones suggests B. onoideus was mostly terrestrial but that it did possess some semi-aquatic adaptations reflecting a slight degree of water dependence.
