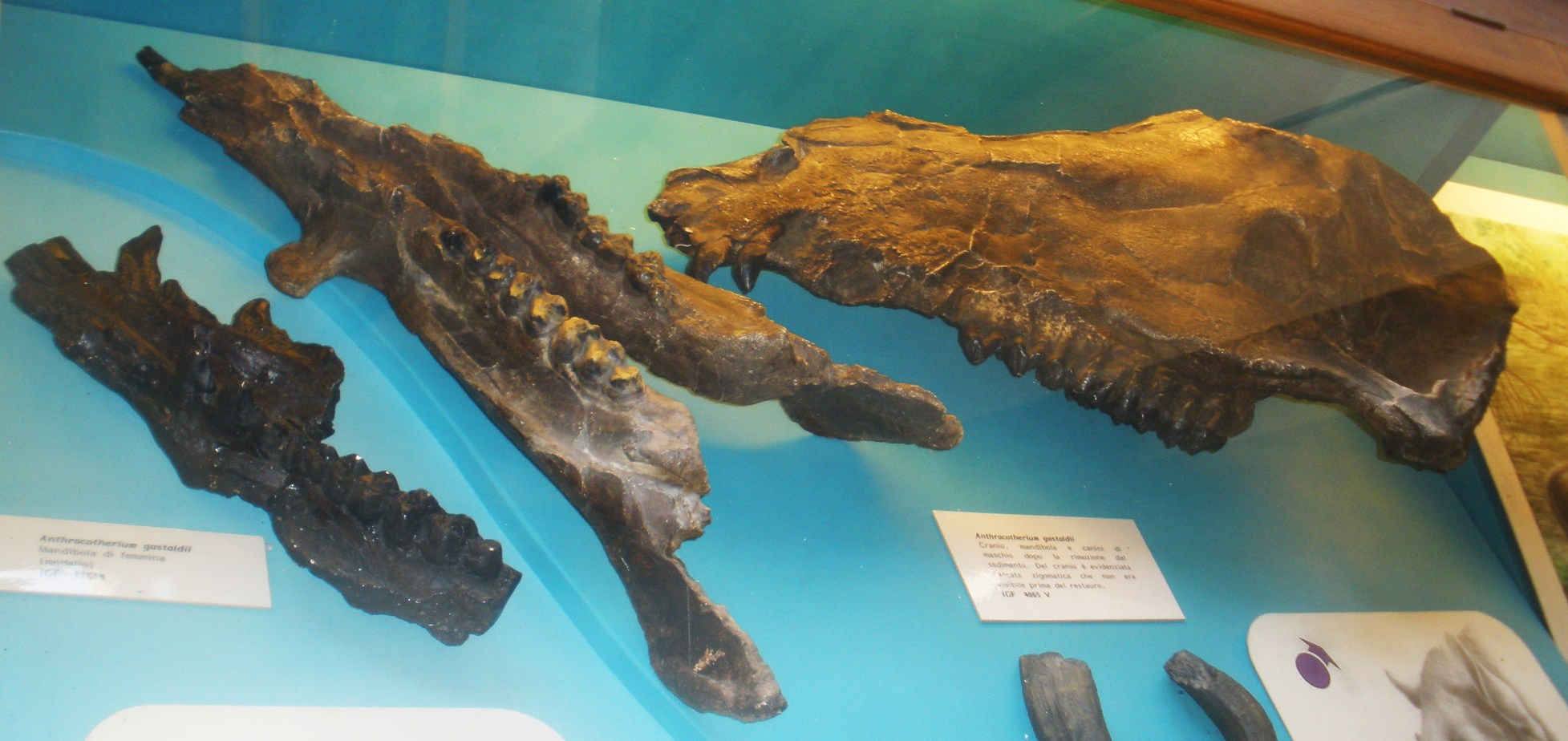
- Skull and jaws of Anthracotherium gastaldii

Scientific classification
- Kingdom: Animalia
- Phylum: Chordata
- Class: Mammalia
- Order: Artiodactyla
- Superfamily: Hippopotamoidea
- Family: †Anthracotheriidae
- Subfamily: †Anthracotheriinae; Leidy, 1869

Genera
- †Anthracotherium; †Heptacodon; †Myaingtherium?; †Paenanthracotherium; †Prominatherium; †Siamotherium?

= Anthracotheriinae =

Anthracotheriinae Temporal range: Middle Eocene–Early Miocene

Extinct subfamily of mammals

Anthracotheriinae is an extinct subfamily of anthracotheriid artiodactyls that lived from Paleogene to early Neogene in North America and Eurasia. The group contained the genera Anthracotherium, Heptacodon, and Paenanthracotherium, as well as possibly Myaingtherium and Siamotherium. They were small to large sized anthracotheres. Anthracotheriines are more primitive than the other two anthracotheriid subfamilies, Microbunodontinae and Bothriodontinae.
