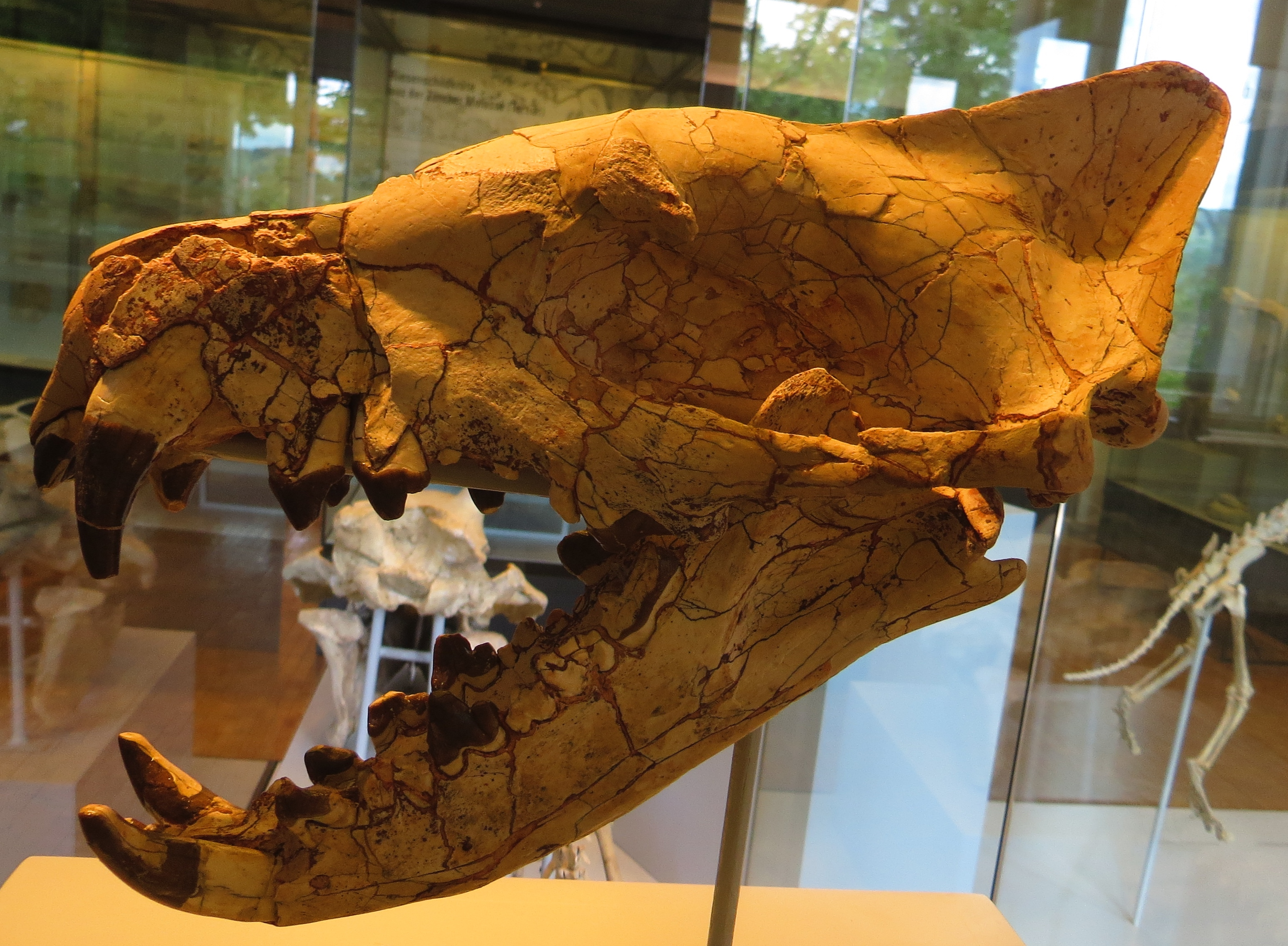
- skull of Hyaenodon horridus
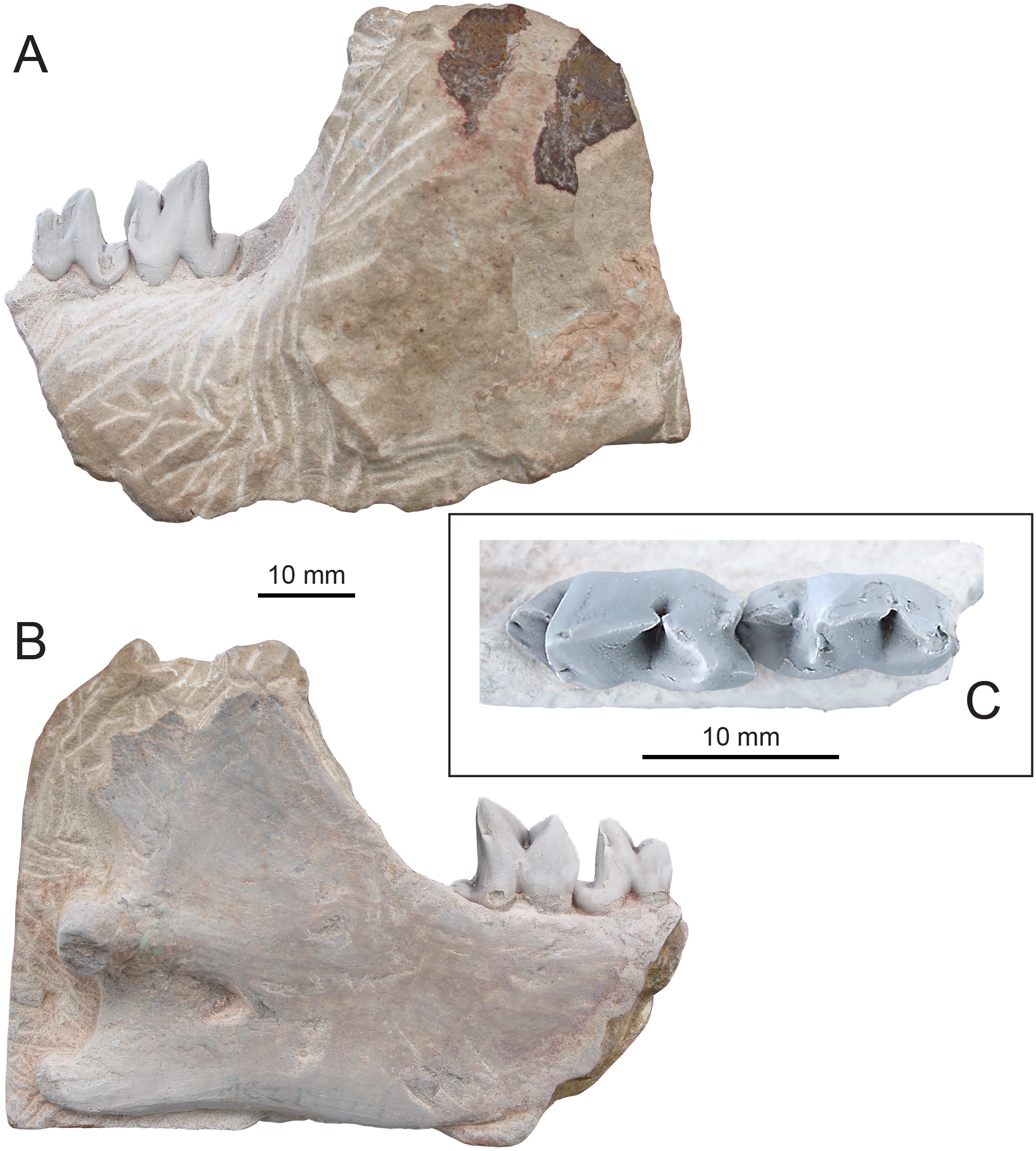
- dentary fragment of Propterodon witteri

Scientific classification
- Kingdom: Animalia
- Phylum: Chordata
- Class: Mammalia
- Order: †Hyaenodonta
- Superfamily: †Hyaenodontoidea
- Family: †Hyaenodontidae
- Subfamily: †Hyaenodontinae; Leidy, 1869

Type genus
- †Hyaenodon Laizer & Parieu, 1838

Genera
- [see text]

Synonyms
- Hyaenodontidae (Leidy, 1869); Hyaenodontini (Van Valen, 1965)

= Hyaenodontinae =

Hyaenodontinae Temporal range: Early Eocene to Late Miocene 52.0–11.3 Ma

Extinct subfamily of mammals

Hyaenodontinae ("hyena teeth") is an extinct subfamily of predatory placental mammals from extinct family Hyaenodontidae. Fossil remains of these mammals are known from Early Eocene to Late Miocene deposits in Eurasia and North America.

== Classification and phylogeny ==
=== Taxonomy ===
- Subfamily: †Hyaenodontinae (Trouessart, 1885)
  - Genus: †Consobrinus (Lange-Badré, 1979)
    - †Consobrinus quercy (Lange-Badré, 1979)
  - Genus: †Propterodon ^{(paraphyletic genus)} (Martin, 1906)
    - †Propterodon morrisi (Matthew & Granger, 1924)
    - †Propterodon paganensis (de Bonis, 2018)
    - †Propterodon tongi (Liu & Huang, 2002)
    - †Propterodon witteri (Zack, 2019)
    - †Propterodon sp. [ZIN no. 34494] (Lavrov & Averianov, 1998)
    - †Propterodon sp. [Erlian Basin, Inner Mongolia, China] (Zhang, 2024)
  - Incertae sedis:
    - †"Pterodon" hyaenoides (Matthew & Granger, 1925)
  - Tribe: †Hyaenodontini (Leidy, 1869)
    - Genus: †Hyaenodon (Laizer & Parieu, 1838)
      - †Hyaenodon brachyrhynchus (Blainville, 1841)
      - †Hyaenodon chunkhtensis (Dashzeveg, 1985)
      - †Hyaenodon dubius (Filhol, 1873)
      - †Hyaenodon eminus (Matthew & Granger, 1925)
      - †Hyaenodon exiguus (Gervais, 1873)
      - †Hyaenodon filholi (Schlosser, 1887)
      - †Hyaenodon gervaisi (Martin, 1906)
      - †Hyaenodon heberti (Filhol, 1876)
      - †Hyaenodon leptorhynchus (Laizer & Parieu, 1838)
      - †Hyaenodon lingbaoensis (Li, 2025)
      - †Hyaenodon minor (Lange-Badré, 1979)
      - †Hyaenodon pervagus (Matthew & Granger, 1924)
      - †Hyaenodon pumilus (Lavrov, 1999)
      - †Hyaenodon requieni (Gervais, 1846)
      - †Hyaenodon rossignoli (Lange-Badré, 1979)
      - †Hyaenodon weilini (Wang, 2005)
      - †Hyaenodon yuanchuensis (Young, 1937)
      - †Hyaenodon sp. [Ergiliyn Dzo Formation, Dornogovi Province, Mongolia] (Young, 1937)
      - Subgenus: †Neohyaenodon ^{(paraphyletic subgenus)} (Thorpe, 1922)
        - †Hyaenodon gigas (Dashzeveg, 1985)
        - †Hyaenodon horridus (Leidy, 1853)
        - †Hyaenodon incertus (Dashzeveg, 1985)
        - †Hyaenodon macrocephalus (Lavrov, 1999)
        - †Hyaenodon megaloides (Mellett, 1977)
        - †Hyaenodon milvinus (Lavrov, 1999)
        - †Hyaenodon mongoliensis (Dashzeveg, 1964)
        - †Hyaenodon montanus (Douglass, 1902)
        - †Hyaenodon vetus (Stock, 1933)
      - Subgenus: †Protohyaenodon ^{(paraphyletic subgenus)} (Stock, 1933)
        - †Hyaenodon brevirostrus (Macdonald, 1970)
        - †Hyaenodon crucians (Leidy, 1853)
        - †Hyaenodon microdon (Mellett, 1977)
        - †Hyaenodon mustelinus (Scott, 1894)
        - †Hyaenodon raineyi (Gustafson, 1986)
        - †Hyaenodon venturae (Mellett, 1977)
