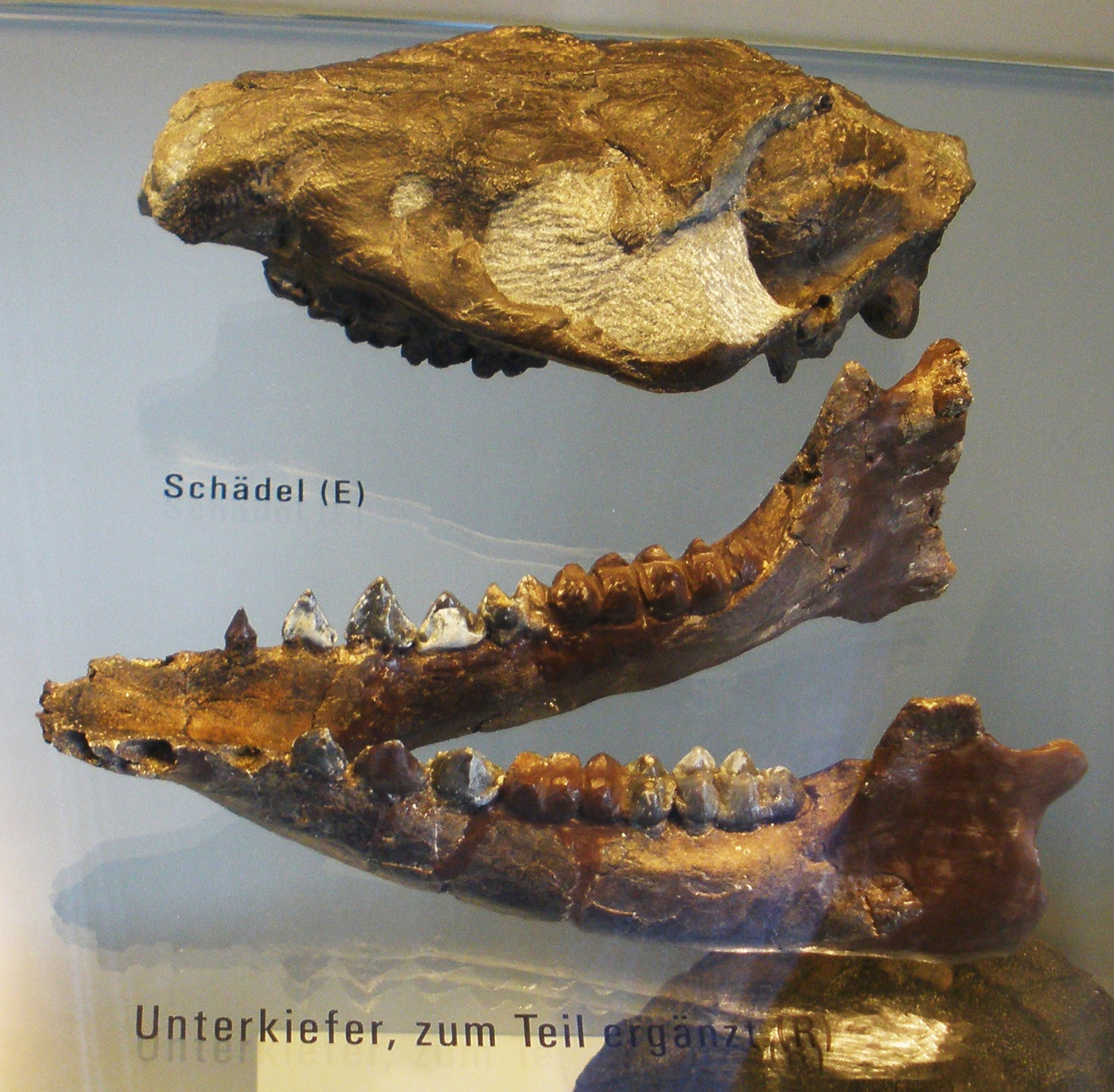
- Skull and jaw of Microbunodon minimum

Scientific classification
- Kingdom: Animalia
- Phylum: Chordata
- Class: Mammalia
- Order: Artiodactyla
- Family: †Anthracotheriidae
- Genus: †Microbunodon

= Microbunodon =

Microbunodon Temporal range: Upper Eocene–Lower Pliocene

Extinct genus of mammals

Microbunodon is a genus of artiodactyl mammals in the family Anthracotheriidae. It lived from the late Eocene to the early Pliocene (about 35–5 million years ago). Its fossil remains have been found in Europe and Asia.

== Description ==
Microbunodon, unlike most of its close relatives, was small in size and with a slight build.It weighed between 20–25 kilograms and the skull was about 20–30 centimeters long. Microbunodon was slim with long legs and a short snout with long prominent canine teeth in males, similar to a saber-toothed cat. It was characterized by a fused mandibular symphysis, with a ventral ridge-like prominence.

== Classification ==
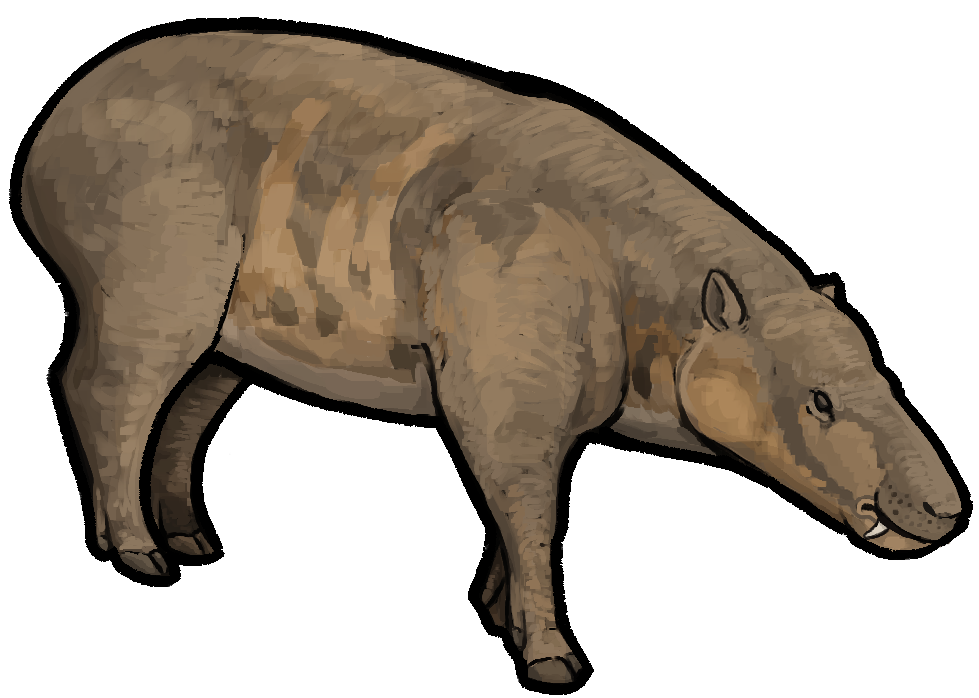
Life Restoration

The genus Microbunodon was established by Deperet in 1908 to accommodate a species previously described by Georges Cuvier in 1822 and attributed to the genus Anthracotherium, as A. minimum, from the Oligocene superior of France. The type species, Microbunodon minimum, lived in the Oligocene in Europe and is known in France, Germany, Switzerland, Austria and Turkey. Other species attributed to this genus are M. silistrensis (early and middle Miocene, Indian subcontinent and Indochina) and M. milaensis (late Miocene and early Pliocene, Indian subcontinent and Indochina). Other fossils attributed to this genus come from the upper Eocene of China and testify to an exceptional longevity of this evolutionary line.

Microbunodon is an anthracothere, a group of artiodactyls usually considered similar to hippopotami. Microbunodon represents an aberrant morphology for this family, whose members usually have large, heavy shapes. Microbunodon and Anthracokeryx have been placed in a separate subfamily, Microbunodontinae.

== Paleobiology ==
Based on the microanatomy of its long bones, M. minimum was a fully terrestrial animal. Also, M. minimum had olfactory bulbs averaging about 783.5 mm^{3} in volume, or about 2.8% of its total brain volume, meaning that it would have had a well developed sense of olfaction. Analysis of the dental wear of Microbunodon reveals that it probably had a diet based on leaves and fruit. It likely lived in forest environments and had a lifestyle quite similar to that of musk deer and mouse deer.

It is likely that it originated in Asia in the Eocene. At the end of the Oligocene, Microbunodon migrated to Europe and spread rapidly, along with other artiodactyls. This event is known as the Microbunodon event, due to the significant impact that the invasion of these animals had on European fauna of the period.
