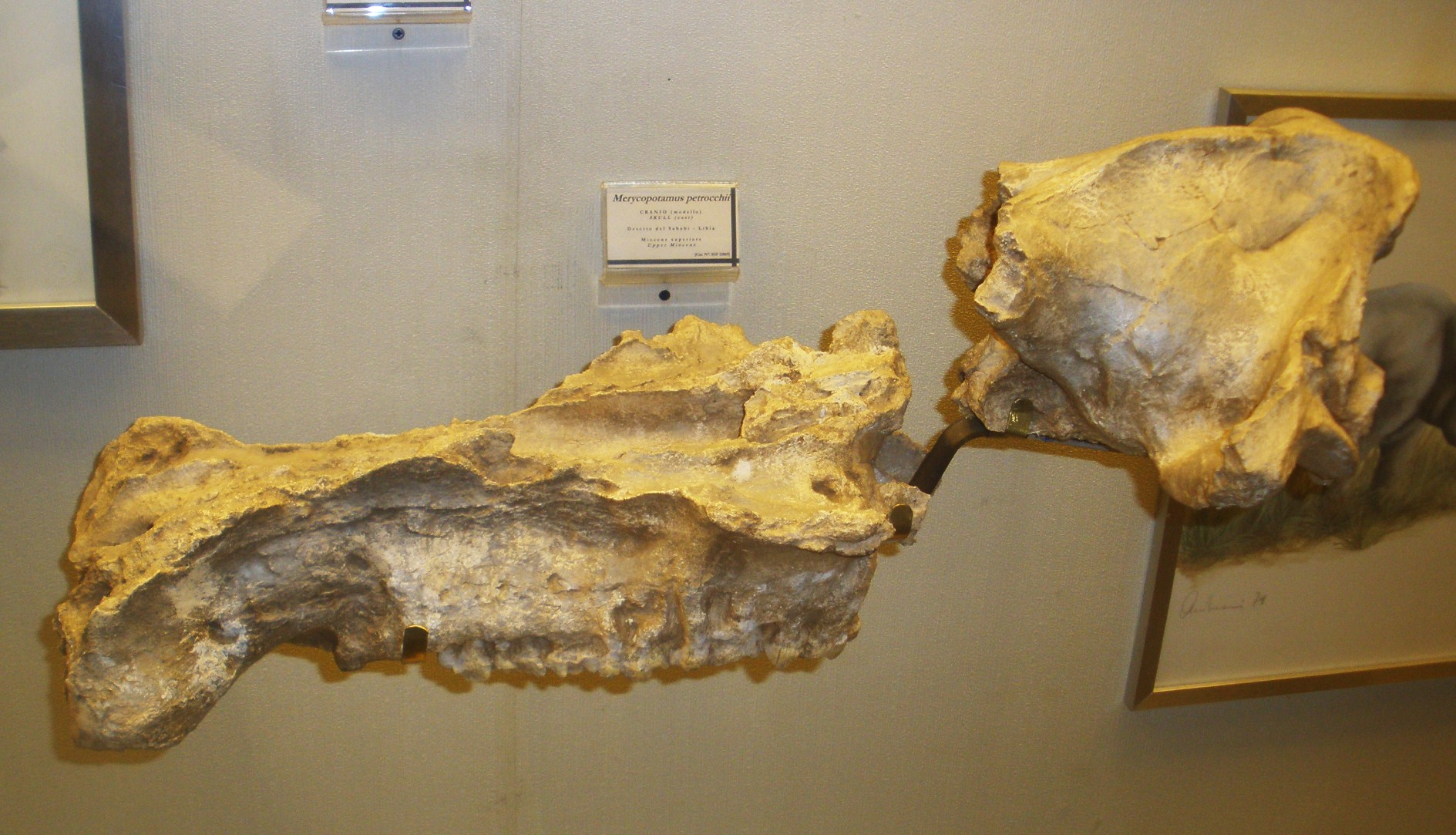
- Fossil of Libycosaurus petrocchii, an anthracothere
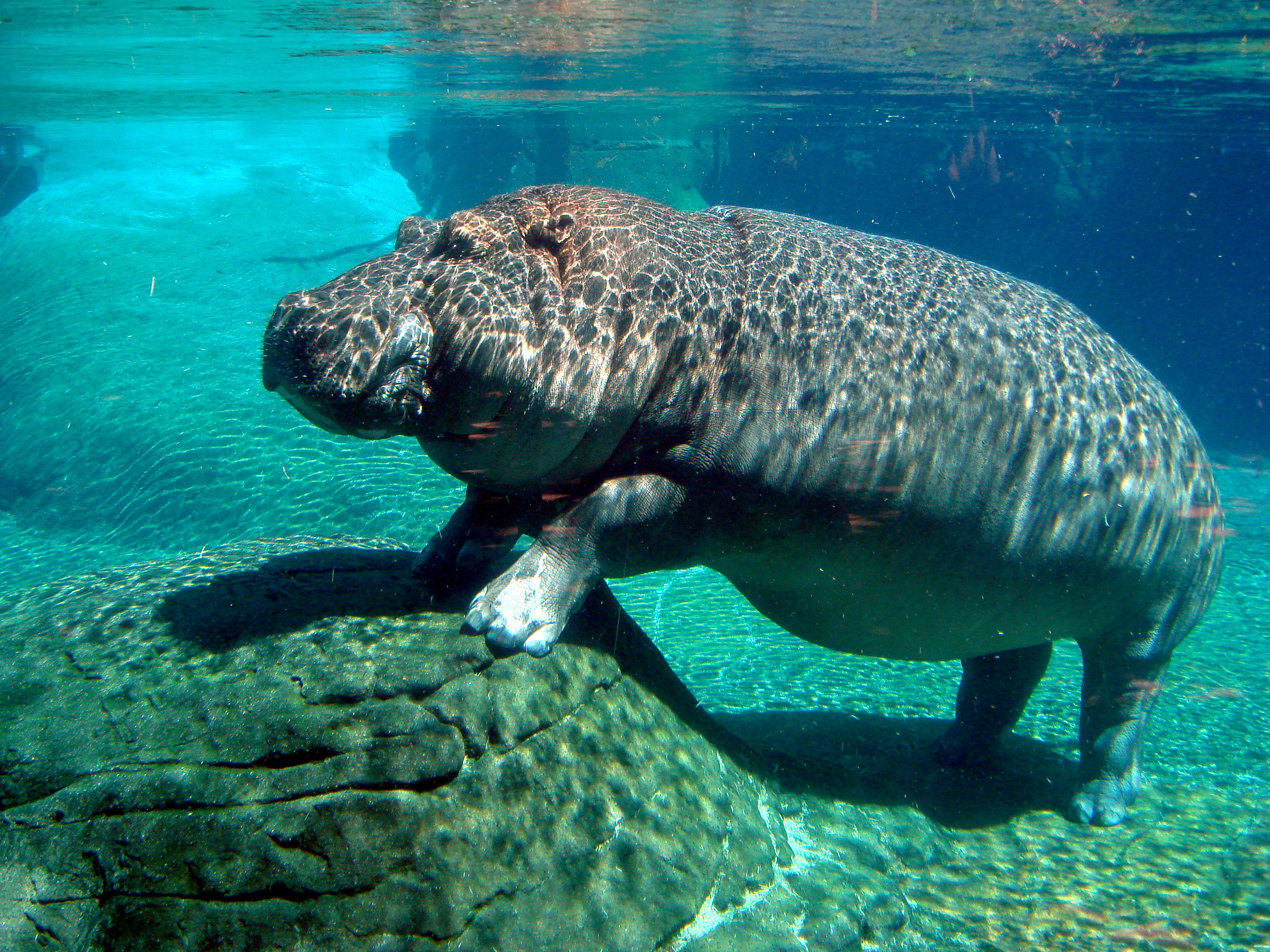
- The hippopotamus (Hippopotamus amphibius), a modern hippo

Scientific classification
- Kingdom: Animalia
- Phylum: Chordata
- Class: Mammalia
- Order: Artiodactyla
- Suborder: Whippomorpha
- Infraorder: Ancodonta; Matthew, 1929

Genera and subclades
- †Choeropotamidae; Hippopotamoidea J.E. Gray, 1821; †Anthracotheriidae (paraphyletic); Hippopotamidae

Synonyms
- Anthracotherioidea Leidy, 1869; Hippopotamidamorpha Spaulding et al., 2009

= Ancodonta =

Ancodonta Temporal range: Middle Eocene – Present

Infraorder of mammals

Ancodonta is an infraorder of artiodactyl ungulates including modern hippopotamus and all mammals closer to hippos than to cetaceans (whales). Ancodonts first appeared in the Middle Eocene, with some of the earliest representatives found in fossil deposits in Southeast Asia. Throughout their evolutionary history they have occupied different browsing and grazing niches in North America, Eurasia and Africa. The last continent is notable as they were among the first laurasiatherian mammals to have migrated to Africa from Europe, where they competed with the native afrothere herbivores for the same niches. Of the nearly 50 genera that have existed, only two of them are extant – Choeropsis and Hippopotamus. The interrelationships within the ancodonts has been contended. The traditional notion is that there at minimum two families Anthracotheriidae and Hippopotamidae and were merely sister taxa. However many detailed research of the dentition among ancodonts, as well as how some anthracotheres were similar to hippos in appearance, lead the current consensus where Anthracotheriidae is paraphyletic to Hippopotamidae. Among the anthracotheres, members of Bothriodontinae are among the closest to the ancestry of hippos, with the Oligocene aged Epirigenys from Lokon, Turkana, Kenya being the sister taxon to hippos. In response of this many similar clade names have been used for this clade (Hippopotamoidea, Anthracotherioidea, and Hippopotamidamorpha).

The placement of Ancodonta among the artiodactyls originally based on basic morphological work that they were the sister group to pigs and peccaries, placed in the suborder Suiformes. However molecular work has found this not to be the case, as the closest relatives are the cetaceans. Cetaceans and ancodonts are now classified in the suborder Whippomorpha. This led to some theories that the last common ancestors of hippos and whales was a semiaquatic mammal, but in a 2015 genomic study that compared the genes responsible in aquatic adaptations within Whippomorpha found it to be the result of convergent evolution, as opposed to shared ancestry. This resolves the issue of how hippos and whales developed their aquatic adaptation despite modern hippos appearing much later in the fossil record than whales.

The cladogram below shows the results of the phylogenetic analysis conducted by Orliac et al. (2010).

- Whippomorpha/Cetancodonta
  - Ancodonta
    - †Choeropotamidae
    - Hippopotamoidea
      - †Microbunodontinae
      - - †Siamotherium
        - - †Anthracotheriinae
          - - †Bothriogenys
            - - - †Libycosaurus
                - †Merycopotamus
              - Hippopotamidae (hippos)
  - Cetaceamorpha (cetaceans and their fossil relatives)
