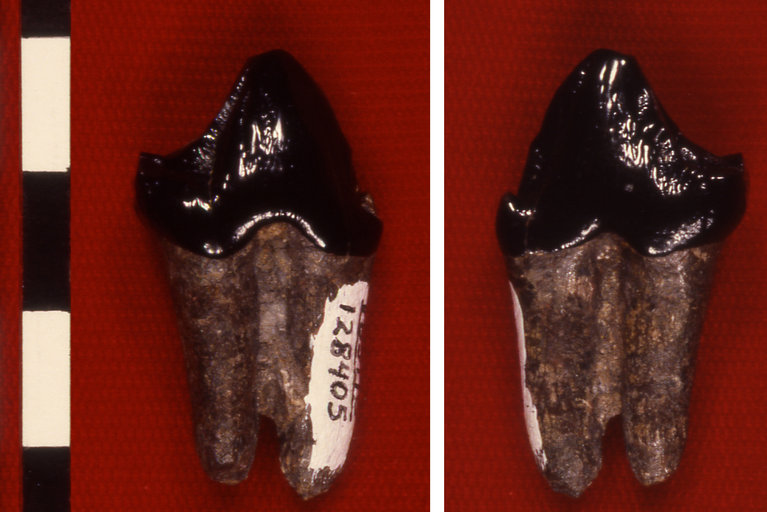
- Tooth

Scientific classification
- Kingdom: Animalia
- Phylum: Chordata
- Class: Mammalia
- Order: Artiodactyla
- Infraorder: Ancodonta
- Superfamily: Hippopotamoidea
- Family: †Anthracotheriidae
- Genus: †Anthracokeryx; Pilgrim & Cotter, 1916

Type species
- †Anthracokeryx birmanicus Pilgrim & Cotter, 1916

Other species
- †A. gungkangensis Young & Zhao, 1972; †A. sinensis Zdansky, 1930; †A. tenuis (Pilgrim & Cotter, 1916); †"A." litangensis Zong et al. 1996; †A. naduongensis Ducrocq et al., 2015; †A. kwangsiensis Qiu, 1977

= Anthracokeryx =

Extinct genus of mammals

Anthracokeryx is a genus of extinct artiodactyl ungulate mammal belonging to Anthracotheriidae that lived in Asia during the middle to late Eocene.

== Taxonomy ==
Life restoration of A. litangensis

Anthracokeryx was treated as a junior synonym of Anthracotherium by Tsubamoto et al. (2002) based on similarities in dental morphology. However, other authors have rejected the synonymy and recognized Anthracokeryx as a distinct form in the subfamily Microbunodontinae.

== Distribution ==
Fossils of Anthracokeryx are known from China, Myanmar, and Vietnam.
