= Oligokeryx =

Oligokeryx Temporal range: Early Oligocene

Scientific classification
- Kingdom: Animalia
- Phylum: Chordata
- Class: Mammalia
- Infraclass: Placentalia
- Order: Artiodactyla
- Family: †Anthracotheriidae
- Genus: †Oligokeryx
- Species: †O. khiansaensis

Binomial name
- †Oligokeryx khiansaensis Ducrocq et al., 2025

Extinct genus of mammals

Oligokeryx is an extinct genus of anthracotheriid that lived during the Rupelian stage of the Oligocene epoch.

== Distribution ==
Oligokeryx khiansaensis is known from Thailand.
