= Etruscotherium =

Etruscotherium Temporal range: Late Miocene

Scientific classification
- Kingdom: Animalia
- Phylum: Chordata
- Class: Mammalia
- Order: Artiodactyla
- Family: †Anthracotheriidae
- Genus: †Etruscotherium
- Species: †E. ribollaense

Binomial name
- †Etruscotherium ribollaense Pickford, 2022

Extinct genus of mammals

Etruscotherium is an extinct genus of anthracotheriid that inhabited Italy during the Late Miocene. It contains the species E. ribollaense.
