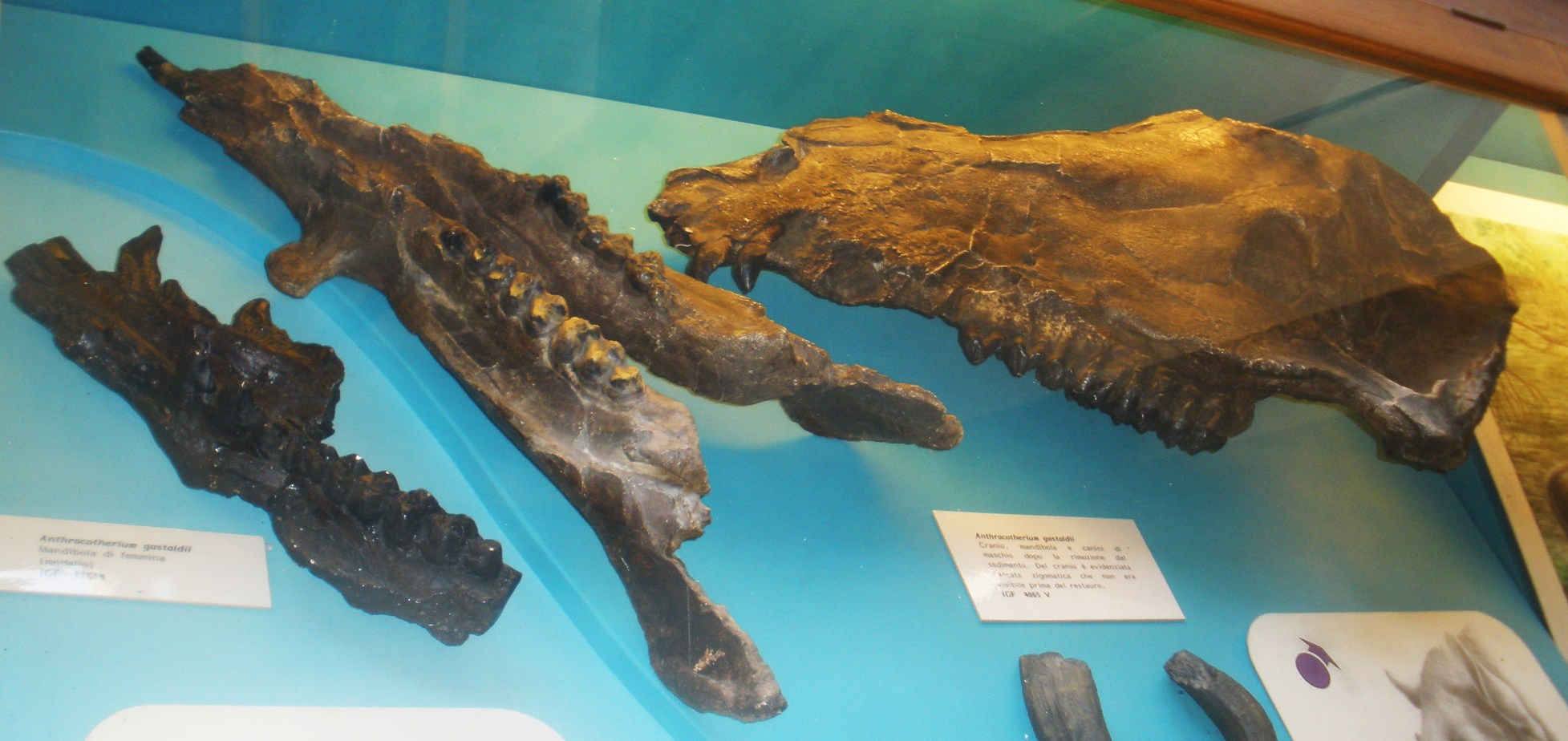
- Anthracotherium magnum skull and jaws

Scientific classification
- Kingdom: Animalia
- Phylum: Chordata
- Class: Mammalia
- Order: Artiodactyla
- Family: †Anthracotheriidae
- Subfamily: †Anthracotheriinae
- Genus: †Anthracotherium; G. Cuvier, 1822

Species
- †A. magnum Cuvier, 1822 (type); †A. chaimanei Ducrocq, 1999; †A. monsvialense de Zigno, 1888; †A. bumbachense Stehlin, 1910; †A. meneghinii Stehlin, 1910; †A. pangan Pilgrim & Cotter, 1916; †A. crassum Pilgrim & Cotter, 1916; †A. kwablianicum Gabounia, 1964

= Anthracotherium =

Anthracotherium Temporal range: Middle Eocene to Early Miocene

Extinct genus of mammals

Anthracotherium (from Ancient Greek ἄνθραξ (ánthrax), meaning "coal", and θηρίον (theríon), meaning "beast") is an extinct genus of anthracotheriid artiodactyls characterized by having 44 teeth, with five semi-crescentic cusps on the crowns of the upper molars. The genus ranged from the middle Eocene period until the early Miocene, having a distribution throughout Eurasia probably even reaching South East Asia (Kalimantan and West Timor). Material subjectively assigned to Anthracotherium from Pakistan suggests the last species died out soon after the start of the Miocene.

== Etymology ==
The genus name stems from the fact that the holotype and other first specimens were originally obtained from the Paleogene (previously known as "Tertiary")-aged lignite (coal) beds of Europe.

== Description ==
Anthracotherium best represents the family Anthracotheriidae, if only because it is the most thoroughly studied. In many respects, especially the anatomy of the lower jaw, Anthracotherium, as with the other members of the family, is similar to the hippopotamus, of which anthracotheriids are probably an ancestral form. The Anthracotheres, together with the hippos, are grouped together with the cetaceans in the clade Whippomorpha. Anthracotheriinae are characterized by three non-ambiguous features, which is their crown height development of the lower canine, and the presence of accessory cristulids from the hypoconulid, posthypocristulid, and labial on the lower and upper molars.

The European Anthracotherium magnum was approximately as large as a pygmy hippo (about 2 m long and weighing up to 250 kg), but there were several smaller species and the genus also occurs in Egypt, India and North America. Members of the genus Anthracotherium, as well as other members of the family Anthracotheriidae, are known colloquially as anthracotheres.

== Palaeoecology ==
With the aforementioned morphological features taken into consideration, it has been found that these anthracotheres are in three dietary categories of extant herbivores: leaf browsers, fruit browsers, and grazers. In the Eocene-aged Pondaung Formation of Myanmar, A. pangan and A. crassum shared a very high percentage of their core niche, with the latter sharing more of it with the former than vice versa.

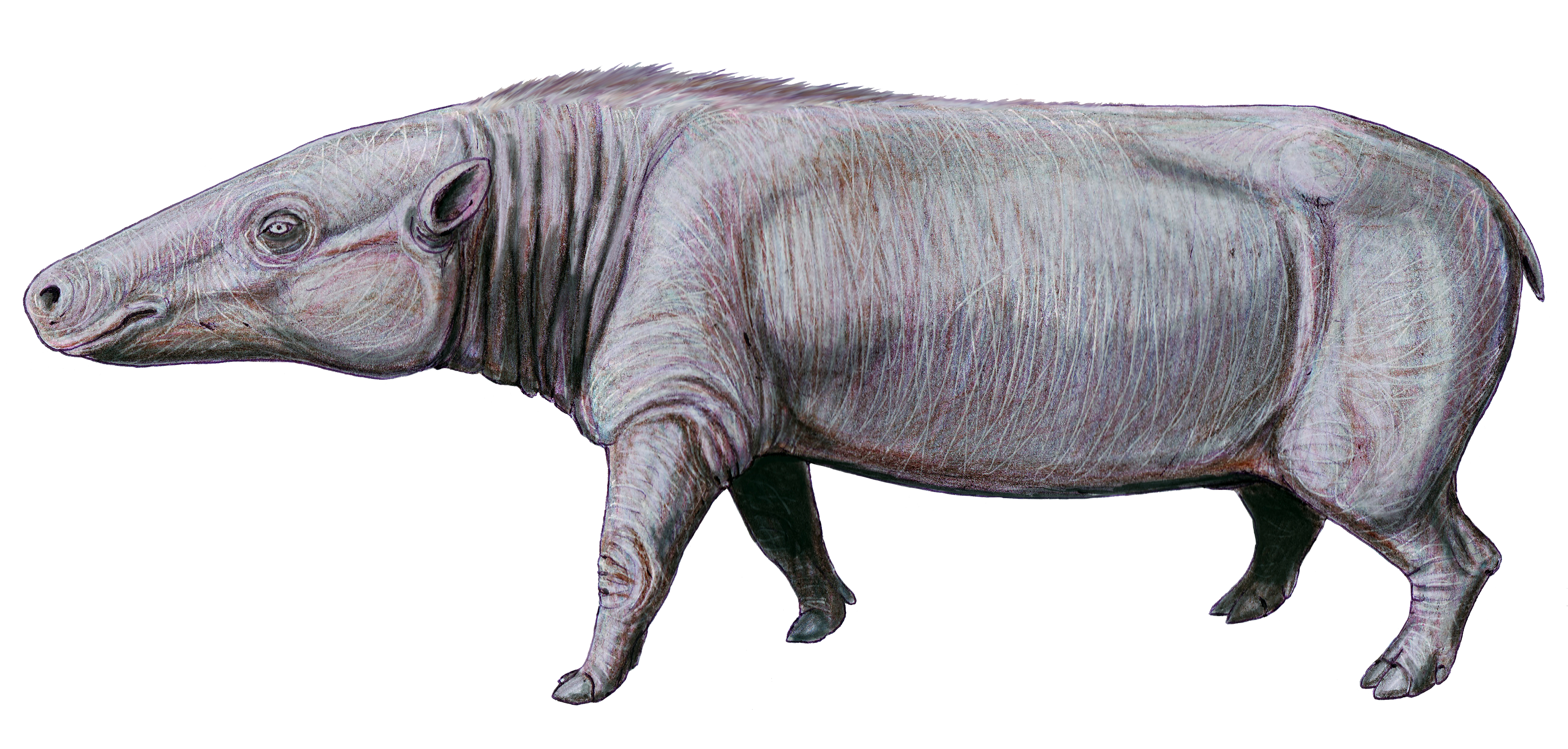
Anthracotherium magnum

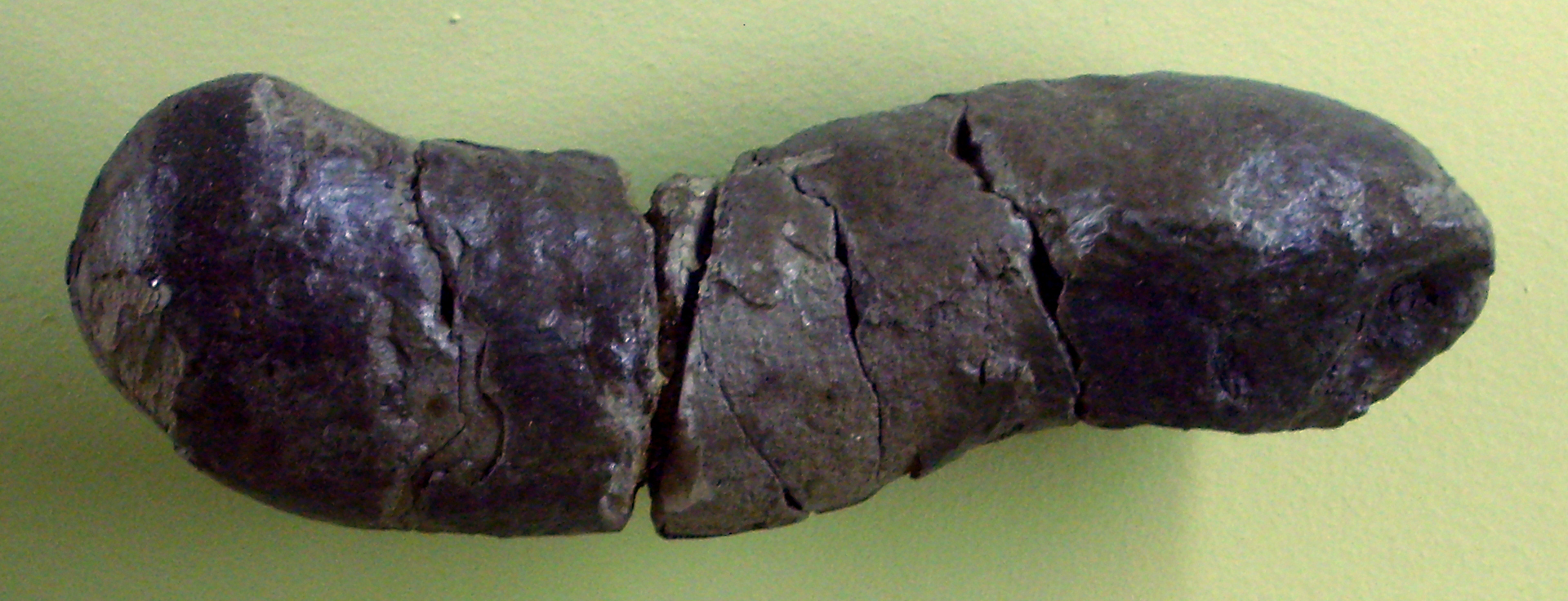
Anthracotherium sp. coprolite at the Museum für Naturkunde, Berlin
