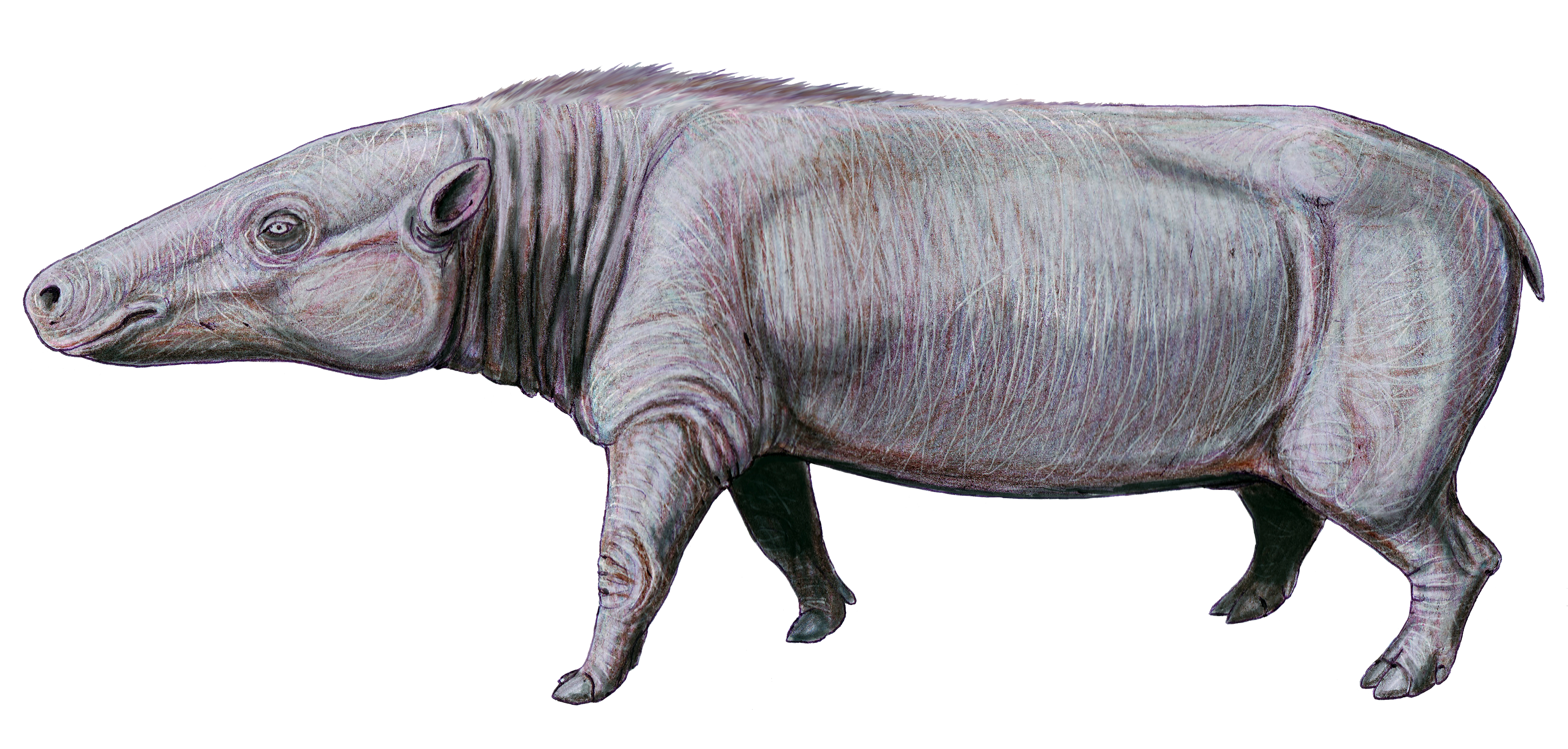
- Anthracotherium

Scientific classification
- Kingdom: Animalia
- Phylum: Chordata
- Class: Mammalia
- Order: Artiodactyla
- Infraorder: Ancodonta
- Superfamily: Hippopotamoidea
- Family: †Anthracotheriidae; Leidy, 1869

Subfamilies and genera
- †Anthracotheriinae; †Bothriodontinae (cladistically includes Hippopotamidae); †Microbunodontinae; †Anthracohyus; †Anthracokeryx; †Anthracothema; †Brachyodus; †Bugtitherium?; †Etruscotherium; †Jaggermeryx; †Myaingtherium; †Nabotherium; †Siamotherium

= Anthracotheriidae =

Anthracotheriidae Temporal range: Middle Eocene–Late Pliocene Descendant taxon Hippopotamidae survives to present

Extinct family of mammals

Anthracotheriidae is a paraphyletic family of extinct, hippopotamus-like artiodactyl ungulates. They are ultimately ancestral to modern Hippopotamidae. The oldest genus, Elomeryx, first appeared during the middle of the Eocene in Asia. They thrived in Africa and Eurasia, with a few species ultimately entering North America during the Oligocene. They died out in Europe and Africa during the Miocene, possibly due to a combination of climatic changes and competition with other artiodactyls, including pigs and hippopotamuses. The youngest non-hippopotamid genus, Merycopotamus, died out in Asia during the Late Pliocene, possibly for the same reasons. The family is named after the first genus discovered, Anthracotherium, which means "coal beast", as the first fossils of it were found in Paleogene-aged coal beds in France. Fossil remains of the anthracothere genus were discovered by the Harvard University and Geological Survey of Pakistan joint research project (Y-GSP) in the well-dated middle and late Miocene deposits of the Pothohar Plateau in northern Pakistan.

In life, the average anthracothere would have resembled a skinny hippopotamus with a comparatively small, narrow head and most likely pig-like in general appearance. They had four or five toes on each foot, and broad feet suited to walking on soft mud. They had full sets of about 44 teeth with five semicrescentric cusps on the upper molars, which, in some species, were adapted for digging up the roots of aquatic plants.

== Classification ==
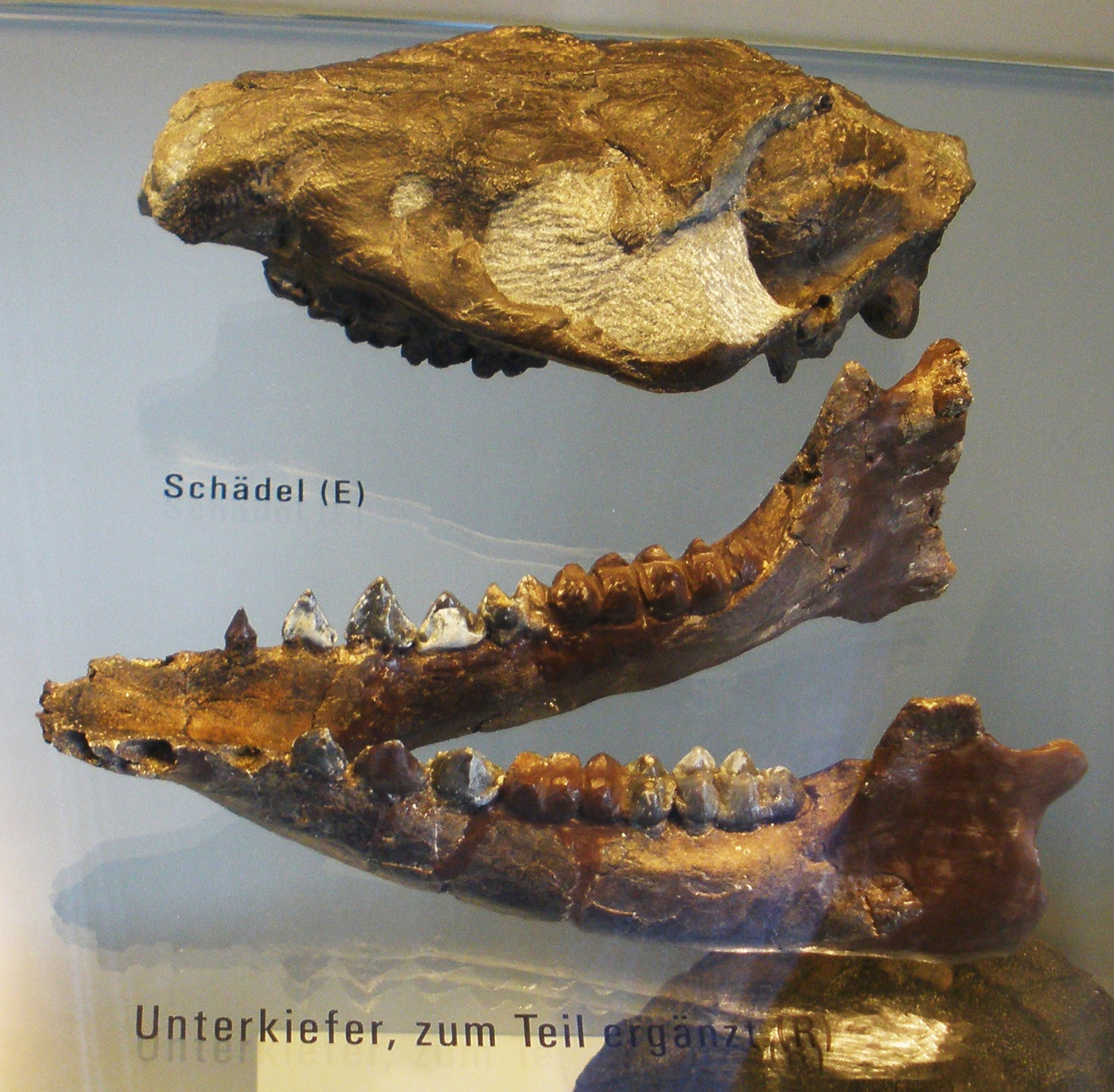
Microbunodon skull

Some skeletal characters of anthracotheres suggest they are related to hippos. The nature of the sediments in which they are fossilized implies they were amphibious, which supports the view, based on anatomical evidence, that they were ancestors of the hippopotamuses. In many respects, especially the anatomy of the lower jaw, Anthracotherium, as with other members of the family, is allied to the hippopotamus, of which it is probably an ancestral form. However, one study suggests that instead of anthracotheres, another pig-like group of artiodactyls, the palaeochoerids, are the true stem group of Hippopotamidae. Evidence against the hypothesised close relationship between anthracotheriids and hippopotamids includes their divergent dP_{4} root morphology.

Recent evidence, gained from comparative gene sequencing, further suggests that hippos are the closest living relatives of whales, so, if anthracotheres are stem hippos, they would also be related to whales in a clade provisionally called Whippomorpha.

However, the earliest known anthracotheres appear in the fossil record in the middle Eocene, well after the archaeocetes had already taken up totally aquatic lifestyles. Although phylogenetic analyses of molecular data on extant animals strongly support the notion that hippopotamids are the closest relatives of cetaceans (whales, dolphins and porpoises), the two groups are unlikely to be closely related when extant and extinct artiodactyls are analyzed. Cetaceans originated about 50 million years ago in the Tethys Sea between India and China, whereas the family Hippopotamidae is only 15 million years old, and the first Asian hippopotamids are only 6 million years old. Yet, analyses of fossil clades have not resolved the issue of cetacean relations.

Another study has offered a suggestion that anthracotheres are part of a clade that also consists of entelodonts (and even Andrewsarchus) and that is a sister clade to other cetancodonts, with Siamotherium as the most basal member of the clade Cetacodontamorpha.
