= Bakate Formation =

Geologic formation in Kenya and Ethiopia

- Stratigraphic range: Early Miocene
- Type: Geological formation
- Sub-units: Buluk Member, Irile Member, Il Jimma Member

Lithology
- Primary: Sandstone, Claystone, Basalt
- Other: Siltstone, Tuff

Location
- Coordinates: 36°36′S 4°16.0002′E
- Region: Marsabit County
- Country: Kenya
- Bakate Formation (Kenya)

The Bakate Formation is a geological formation in northwest Kenya and the nearby Fejej region of Ethiopia. It dates to the Early Miocene. Fossils of animals such as proboscideans and crocodilians have been recovered from the formation.

== Description ==
The formation was depositied during the Early Miocene. With the Buluk Member specifically being deposited during the Miocene Climatic Optimum (MCO) (~17 to 16 Ma). With a warmer, though not hotter, climate than today.

The Buluk member was deposited in a fluvial lacustrine environment with sillicified tree trunks showing that the formation was a partially wooded, seasonally dry forest with higher than-present rainfall and was dominated by C3 plants, though in some localities C4 plants, such as grasses, were more prevelent.

The Buluk Member outcrops at the uplift of the Suregai-Asille plateau.

== Geology ==
The primary lithology of the Buluk Member is sandstone and claystone with tuff, siltstone and basalt also present. The Irle Member is primarily made up of basaltic lava, while the lithology of the Il Jimma Member is primarily made up of igneous rocks.

== Palaeobiota ==
Color key: Taxon / Reclassified taxon / Taxon falsely reported as present / Dubious taxon or junior synonym / Ichnotaxon / Ootaxon / Morphotaxon

Notes
Uncertain or tentative taxa are in small text
~~crossed out~~ taxa are discredited.

=== Fauna ===
==== Mammals ====
===== Afrotheres =====
Afrotheres of the Batake Formation
Genus	Species	Location	Material	Notes	Images
Afrochoerodon	A. kisumuensis	Buluk Member	Multiple specimens	Formerly classified as a species of Platybelodon as P. kisumuensis	
Afrohyrax	A. championi	Buluk Member		Formerly classified as a species Megalohyrax as M. championi	
Archaeobelodon	A. tassyi	Buluk Member	A cranium and several isolated lower tusks	An amebelodontid proboscidean	
Gomphotherium	G. sp. indet.	Buluk Member	A few molars.	A gomphotheriid proboscidean	
Prodeinotherium	P. hobleyi	Buluk Member	Multiple specimens	A deinotheriid proboscidean	
Protanancus	P. presbytatos	Buluk Member	Multiple teeth and maxillary fragments	An amebelodontid proboscidean	
Zygolophodon	Z. microgigas	Buluk Member	Multiple teeth	A mammutid proboscidean	

===== Artiodactyla =====
Artiodactyls of the Batake Formation
Genus	Species	Location	Material	Notes	Images
Diamantohyus	D. africanus			A sanitheriid artiodactyl.	Canthumeryx Dorcatherium
Dorcatherium	D. chappuisi			A chevrotain.	Canthumeryx Dorcatherium
Dorcatherium	D. pigotti			A chevrotain.	Canthumeryx Dorcatherium
Canthumeryx	C. cf. stirtensis			A giraffid.	Canthumeryx Dorcatherium
Namachoerus	N. cf. moruoroti			Formerly included in the genus Lopholistriodon as L. cf. moruoroti.	Canthumeryx Dorcatherium
Sivameryx	S. sp.			Formerly included in the junior synonym Hyboops as H. sp.	Canthumeryx Dorcatherium
Libychochoerus	L. massai			A suid.	Canthumeryx Dorcatherium
Listriodon	L. sp.			A suid	Canthumeryx Dorcatherium

===== Perissodactyls =====
Perissodactyls of the Batake Formation
Genus	Species	Location	Material	Notes	Images
Aceratherium	A. acutirostratum			A rhinoceros.	Aceratherium
Chilotheridium	C. pattersoni			A rhinocerotoid	Aceratherium
Chilotheridium	C. sp.			A rhinocerotoid	Aceratherium
Rusingaceros	R. leakeyi			Formerly classified as a species of Dicerorhinus as D. leakeyi	Aceratherium

===== Primates =====
Primates of the Batake Formation
Genus	Species	Location	Material	Notes	Images
Afropithecus	A. turkanensis		A partial skull	A Homonid	
cf. Kenyapithecus	cf. K. walkeri				
Hominoidea	Indeterminate				
Prohylobates	P. sp.			An old world monkey	
Similolus	S. enjiessi				
Noropithecus	N. bulukensis			An old world monkey.	
cf. Micropithecus	cf. M. clarki			An old world monkey.	

===== Feraes =====
Feraes of the Batake Formation
Genus	Species	Location	Material	Notes	Images
Hyainailouros	H. sulzeri	Lower Buluk	Jaw material and limb elements	A hyaenodont. Remains formerly assigned to H. nyanzae now belong to this species.	
Hyainailouros	H. cf. napakensis	Lower Buluk	Broken canine fragment	Known from a single canine larger then Anasinopa the second largest Rusinga hyaenodont, so assigned to the smallest Hyainailouros species.	
Hyaenodonta indet. A	Indeterminate	Lower Buluk	Limb fragments	A hyaenodont about the size of a leopard, possibly Leakitherium hiwegi, or Isohyaenodon andrewsi.	
Hyaenodonta indet. B	Indeterminate	Lower Buluk	Right mandible fragment	A small hyaenodont similar to Sectisodon	
Cynelos	C. macrodon	Lower Buluk	Molars		
Cynelos	C. jitu	Lower Buluk	Partial skull and limb material	Holotype material from Buluk, A very large species of amphicyonid.	
Mioprionodon	?M. sp.	Lower Buluk	mandible		
Feliformia indet.	Indeterminate	Lower Buluk	Fragment of humerus	Very small	
Hyaenodonta or/and Carnivora indet.	Indeterminate		Teeth and skull fragments	Material too fragmentary to be placed in any Ferae family may belong to above listed taxa	

==== Reptiles ====
Reptiles of the Batake Formation
Genus	Species	Location	Material	Notes	Images
Chelonia	Indeterminate	Buluk member		A relative of the modern green sea turtle	
Trionychidae	Indeterminate	Buluk member		A softshell turtle.	
Pelomedusidae	Indeterminate	Buluk member		An African side-necked turtle.	
Crocodylia indet.	Indeterminate	Buluk member		A crocodilian.	
Crocodylus	C. cf. niloticus	Buluk member		A crocodilian.	
Tomistoma	T. sp.	Buluk member		A relative of the modern False Gharial.	

==== Fish ====
Fish of the Batake Formation
Genus	Species	Location	Material	Notes	Images
Protopterus	P. sp.	Buluk Member		A lungfish.	
Clariidae	Indeterminate	Buluk Member		An airbreathing catfish.	

=== Flora ===
Multiple indeterminate remains of fruits, twigs, seeds and leaves have also been found in the formation.

==== Angiosperms ====
Angiosperms of the Batake Formation
Genus	Species	Location	Material	Notes	Images
cf. Anonaspurmum	cf. A. sp.		Seeds and fruits.	A custard apple.	
Anonaspurmum	A. elegans			A custard apple.	
Anonaspurmum	A. quadralobatum			A custard apple.	
Antrocaryon	A. paramicraster			A cashew tree relative.	
Cynometroxylon	C. sp.		Wood	A legume.	
cf. Acacia	cf. A. sp.		Wood	An acacia tree.	
Stereospermoxylon	S. eoacuminatissumum		Wood	A begonia.	
Sapotoxylodon	S. sp. 1		Wood	A member of sapotaceae	
Sapotoxylodon	S. sp. 2		Wood	A member of sapotaceae	
Angeospermae	Indeterminate		Wood	Multiple species.	
Oleacae	Indeterminate		Wood	A member of oleacae.	
Rutaceae	Indeterminate		Wood	A member of rutaceae.	
Sapindaceae	Indeterminate		Wood	A member of sapindaceae.	
Parinari	P. antiquum			A chrysobalanacene tree	
