= Diamantofelis =

Diamantofelis Temporal range: Late Burdigalian

Scientific classification
- Kingdom: Animalia
- Phylum: Chordata
- Class: Mammalia
- Order: Carnivora
- Family: Felidae
- Genus: †Diamantofelis; Morales et al., 1998

Type species
- †Diamantofelis ferox Morales et al., 1998

Extinct genus of felids

Diamantofelis is an extinct genus of felids that lived in what is now Namibia during the Early Miocene. It contains a single species, Diamantofelis ferox.

== Discovery and naming ==
This genus was described in 1998 on the basis of remains discovered at the locality of Arrisdrift in Namibia, which has variously been dated to 17.5 Ma or 16 Ma. The holotype (AD 98'95), is a left mandible which includes the canine and cheek teeth. In 2003 various postcranial remains belonging to this genus were described. These include the first phalanx (AD 601'99) as well as the proximal end of a left ulna (AD 112'94) Furthermore, the fragments of another ulna (AM 2'99), found at the slightly older locality Auchas, which dates to ca. 19 Ma, were referred to Diamantofelis.

A second species named Diamantofelis minor was originally described from the same locality, but has since been moved to the genus Namafelis. These two genera are notable for being the first, and until the description of Asilifelis in 2012 the only, known felid remains from the lower Miocene of Africa.

It is named after the Diamond Area 1, where the fossils were found. The specific name ferox translates to "fierce".

== Description ==
Diamantofelis is the largest felid known from the Early Miocene of Africa. Its size has been described as slightly smaller than a cheetah, and as comparable to a small cougar.

It possesses a very robust mandible, with a short horizontal ramus and a masseteric fossa which does not reach the level of m1 talonid. Its diastema is short and its articulation strong and covered in heavy rugosities. Its canine is sub-rounded in transverse section, with a relatively low crown possessing two sharp crests, in posterior and anterior position, respectively. The cheek dentition is very sectorial, with elongated and narrow premolars and carnassial. The p1 and p2 are absent. The central cuspid of the p3 is high, while the anterior and posterior ones are lower and smaller. A moderate posterior cingulum borders the posterior accessory cusplet. Both the labial and lingual cingula are smooth. Its p4 is also narrow, and very-high crowned, with well-developed accessory cuspids. The m1 is damaged, lacking the top of the paraconid and the lingual part of the protoconid. Regardless, it can be determined that it possessed a rather high paraconid with a small anterobasal expansion. Just anterior to the very short talonid is a low inflection in the buccal enamel surface, corresponding to the base of a small metaconid. In comparison to Pseudaelurus, its mandible and diastema are much shorter, while its premolars and m1 are much narrower and higher. Among felids, species with short jaws take proportionally smaller prey than those with longer jaws, as the length of the jaw determines the gape distance, and therefore the size of the prey that fits within their canine teeth.

The mandibular proportions showcase that its head already looked rounded and cat-like, with a shortened muzzle and hypercarnivorous dentition.

Only fragmentary postcranial materials are known from this genus. Its first phalanx is slightly larger than that of the Iberian Lynx, but its morphology is practically identical otherwise. The proximal end of its left ulna is of rectangular shape and elongated anteroposteriorly. The olecranon tuberosity is formed by the widened and rugose posterior margin. A central groove is developed in the anterior half of the proximal surface, and, a bit more medially advanced, similar sized swellings are developed on its anterolateral and anteromedial vertices. A central narrowing is found on the anterior surface, between the proximal surface and the anconeal process, which is similar to that seen in other felids. Just like in these forms, the anterior border is not curved except that its proximo-distal axis is parallel to the same axis of the bone. A distally marked curve is created by the margin of this process. Located below the anconeal process, the trochlear notch is very concave and slightly medially inclined. In comparison to similar-sized felids, the latero-medial width is proportionally slimmer. A small, distally curving swelling that can develop on the antero-distal margin of the trochlear notch can develop in various felids, but this condition is not found in Diamantofelis. Other resemblances it has with extant felids is the roughened posterior margin of the proximal end, which narrows distally and leans slightly medially, and the antero-distal margin of the trochlear notch, which overhangs the antero-proximal end. A lateral tubercle is located slightly below the middle in its proximal margin and its proximal end is straight. Both the semicircular lateral surface of the anconeal process and a shallow trochlear notch are developed on the anterior border. It possesses a high and rather straight olecranon process. Both the medial and lateral surface of the proximal end have a rough surface, although a clear crest is developed on the postero-proximal margin of the medial side. Its diaphysis is medio-laterally compressed and is almost straight. The ulna from Auchas is similar, although larger and in possession of a more massive and broader olecranon process. The tuberosities of the ulna's antero-proximal border can be used to determine some biomechanical aspects of carnivorans. As the adaptions of Diamantofelis are very similar to those of the margay, it can be deduced to have been a forest-dwelling cat with weak cursorial abilities.

== Taxonomy ==
Except for its close relationship to Namafelis, the affinities of Diamantofelis are not well-understood. It is clearly not particularly closely related to Asilifelis or Katifelis, the other Early Miocene felids from Africa, which possessed comparatively advanced dental characteristics. Indeed, it has been suggested that Asilifelis originates from a different dispersal event into Africa altogether. Its features are of "Pseudaelurus-grade", suggesting it is more basal than machairodontines and felines, and its dental features match those of European pseudaelurines. Similarities to the barbourofelid Afrosmilus, which was originally considered to have been a feline, have been noted since its original description. As such, possible barbourofelid affinities have been proposed. Nowadays, they are usually considered felids.

== Paleoecology ==
The locality of Arrisdrift likely represents a side channel of the Proto-Orange River, which was only occasionally filled with flowing water, perhaps when the river overflowed during the rainy season. The rest of the time it was a shallow pool. The presence of 'Crocodylus' gariepensis and giant tortoises indicate a more tropical climate than found in the area today. The habitat was likely a bushy, rather wooded savanna, with a gallery-forest along the river.

Diamantofelis shared its habitat with its smaller relative Namafelis minor, as well as other small and medium-sized carnivorans – the viverrid Orangictis gariepensis, the stenoplesictid Africanictis meini, the large mustelid Namibictis senuti and the hyainailourid Buhakia hyaenoides. The largest predators of Arrisdrift were the bear-dogs Namibiocyon ginsburgi and Amphicyon giganteus, and the hyaenodont Hyainailouros sulzeri. Diamantofelis likely preyed on the smaller animals of this faunal assemblage, such as the macroscelidid Myohyrax, the springhare Megapedetes, the lagomorph Australagomys or various birds and rodents. Somewhat larger prey possibly included the small bovid Namacerus or young of the large hyrax Prohyrax. Other inhabitants include the small suids Namachoerus and Nguruwe, the tragulid Dorcatherium, the climacoceratid Orangemeryx, the diminutive aardvark Myorycteropus and the proboscidea Afromastodon and Prodeinotherium.
