= Namibiocyon =

Namibiocyon Temporal range: Late Burdigalian

Scientific classification
- Kingdom: Animalia
- Phylum: Chordata
- Class: Mammalia
- Order: Carnivora
- Family: †Amphicyonidae
- Subfamily: †Amphicyoninae
- Genus: †Namibiocyon; Morales and Pickford, 2022

Type species
- †Namibiocyon ginsburgi Morales et al., 1998

Synonyms
- Ysengrinia ginsburgi (Morales et al., 1998); Afrocyon ginsburgi Morales et al., 2016; Cynelos ginsburgi (Morlo et al., 2019)

Extinct genus of carnivoran mammals

Namibiocyon is an extinct genus of carnivoran mammals, belonging to the family Amphicyonidae ("bear dogs"), that lived in Namibia during the Early Miocene epoch. Before the erection of this taxon in 2022, the type and only species, N. ginsburgi, had been assigned to a variety of other genera. It is notable for its adaptions toward hypercarnivory.

== History ==
Fossils of Namibiocyon were found Arrisdrift in Namibia, which has variously been dated to 17.5 Ma or 16 Ma, while similar remains are known from Grillental, Fiskus, Langental and Elisabethfeld, which are slightly older localities from the Northern Sperrgebiet. Remains belonging to this genus were first mentioned by Hendey in 1978, who identified them as Amphicyon cf. steinheimensis. It was not until 1998, that the species Ysengrinia ginsburgi was described on basis of a left mandible (AD 133) and a right maxilla (AD 604'94), with the former designated as holotype. Furthermore, postcranial remains belonging to this species—a left calcaneum (AD 611 '98) and two left metatarsals (AD 17'00 & AD 219'97)—as well as a mandible fragment (PQAD 611) and several isolated teeth - were described in 2003. The referral of this species to Ysengrinia was soon questioned, and in a revision of African amphicyonid species, Morales et al. moved it to the genus Afrocyon. This was challenged by Morlo et al., who instead referred it to the genus Cynelos. Finally, Morales et al. erected the new genus Namibiocyon for this species in 2022, an assignment which was followed by Morlo et al.

The species name ginsburgi honors the palaeontologist Leonard Ginsburg.

== Description ==
Although larger than a wolf, Namibiocyon was a medium-sized amphicyonid, bigger than species such as Ysengrinia gerandiana and Cynelos lemanensis, but slightly smaller than Afrocyon and C. anubisi (which is sometimes moved into a separate genus, Mogharacyon). The dentition of this genus is trenchant and adapted towards hypercarnivory, with a reduced p4 protocone, a high length/breadth index, narrow m2 talonid, a strongly reduced m1 metaconid and a m1 paracristid pointing more anteriorly than in other amphicyonids.

Among its defining features are the small diastema occurring between the third and fourth premolars, and the infra-orbital foramen is located above it. The strongly reduced P3 is formed of a single, rather low cusp. The P4 possesses a greatly reduced protocone, a short metastyle and completely lacks a parastyle. However, it has a very voluminous paracone, which has a clearly defined anterior crest, that is interrupted by an incision at mid-height. M1's metacone possesses a strong external cingulum at its base, which weakens at the base of the larger paracone. This cingulum is separated from the protocone by a deep slit. In comparison to the weaker parastyle, the metastyle is high and well-marked. The similar sized paraconule and metaconule both back onto a dune-shaped protocone. Its trigon possesses a deep central valley. The size of its alveoli in the maxilla suggests that its M2 was not reduced, clearly differentiating if from Ysengrinia.

Namibiocyon possesses an extensive mandibular symphysis, which has a rugose surface, and a high horizontal ramus. Two foramina occur in the mandible, one of which is aligned with the gap between m1 and m2, whereas the other is below p3. Its canine has been described as feloid, with two well-marked crests, which are located posterior and lingual, respectively. The poorly preserved lower premolars are separated from each other by diastema, among which the anterior ones are more developed than the posterior ones. The p4 possesses a low anterior accessory cusplet and a slightly higher posterior accessory cusplet, as well as a strong internal cingulum. The relatively short m1 has a high trigonid and talonid. The tall and narrow hypoconid dominates the former and occupies most of the latter. Both the almost vertical paraconid and the very high protoconid are narrow. The rather small metaconid is located close to the protoconid. The m2 is much smaller than m1, with a high and vertical external wall and a low lingual one. The trigonid lacks a paraconid, and is dominated by the large, high protoconid, which is located in front of the metaconid. A low antero-internal valley is located in the anterior part of the trigonid. The talonid possesses a narrow posterior margin, and consists predominantly of an enormous hypoconid.

The proportions of the calcaneus are quite unlike those of Amphicyon, with a proportionally greater proximo-distally articular zone. It is slightly concave in lateral view, and here is a marked area for the musculus quadratus plantae, reaching almost to the tuber calcis, in its central zone. There is a slight fossa for ligamentary attachment near the anterior margin in front of the insertion of the muscle. As in other amphicyonids, the talar facet of the coracoid process, whereas the medio-laterally elongated sustentaculum tali is less distally displaced than in Amphicyon major, and its posterior groove has more marked borders. The proximal half of its anterior border is also thinner than in that species. Its coracoid process also possesses a long, narrow and convex facet, below which a rugose surface is developed in the distal half of its anterior surface. The more or less circular tuber calcis has a slightly rugose surface, with a smooth circular area on its anterior margin, which is surrounded by the medial, lateral and posterior borders, where the calcaneal tendon inserts. Whereas the articular facet for the cuboid of A. major is elliptical and slightly concave in distal view, that of Namibiocyon is semicircular. The two preserved metatarsals are short and robust, and resemble those of Amphicyon.

== Classification ==
Namibiocyon ginsburgi was originally classified as a species of Ysengrinia, a taxon with similar hypercarnivorous adaptions now referred to the subfamily Thaumastocyoninae. Meanwhile, Namibiocyon, and all other amphicyonids known from Africa, are members of the tribe Amphicyonini. Its strongly pronounced hypercarnivorous features have led some researchers to suggest that it was ancestral to the genus Myacyon, which was widespread throughout Africa in the middle to late Miocene. Opposed to the trend seen in several of its African members, Eurasian species of this tribe showcase adaptions towards mesocarnivory and bone-crushing, suggesting that this tribe's radiation was likely considerably more complex than usually acknowledged.

== Palaeoecology ==
The locality of Arrisdrift likely represents a side channel of the Proto-Orange River, which was only occasionally filled with flowing water, perhaps when the river overflowed during the rainy season. The rest of the time it was a shallow pool. The presence of 'Crocodylus' gariepensis and giant tortoises indicate a more tropical climate than found in the area today. The habitat was likely a bushy, rather wooded savanna, with a gallery-forest along the river.

In comparison to other predators of this ecosystem, Namibiocyon was of intermediate size, considerably smaller than its larger relative Amphicyon and the giant hyaenodont Hyainailourus, but larger than the felids Diamantofelis and Namafelis, the viverrid Orangictis, the stenoplesicitid Africanictis, the large mustelid Namibictis and the hyainailourid Buhakia. Therefore, it likely preyed on medium-sized mammals, such as the suids Namachoerus and Nguruwe, the tragulid Dorcatherium, the small bovid Namacerus, or juveniles of the climatoceratid Orangemeryx. Other inhabitants include the macroscelidid Myohyrax, the springhare Megapedetes, the lagomorph Australagomys the diminutive aardvark Myorycteropus and the proboscidea Afromastodon and Prodeinotherium.
