= Namafelis =

Namafelis Temporal range: Late Burdigalian

Scientific classification
- Kingdom: Animalia
- Phylum: Chordata
- Class: Mammalia
- Order: Carnivora
- Family: Felidae
- Genus: †Namafelis; Morales et al., 2003

Type species
- †Namafelis minor Morales et al., 1998

Extinct genus of mammals

Namafelis is an extinct genus of felids that lived in what is now Namibia during the Early Miocene. It contains a single species, Namafelis minor. Closely related to Diamantofelis, it is of "Pseudaelurus-grade", and therefore a rather basal member of the cat family.

== Discovery and naming ==
Material of this species, including the holotype (AD 99'95), a left mandible including the cheek teeth, was discovered at the locality of Arrisdrift in Namibia, which has variously been dated to 17.5 Ma or 16 Ma, and originally described as Diamantofelis minor. However, a 2003 study led by the same authors as its original description came to the conclusion that the differences were pronounced enough to erect the genus Namafelis. It also described an almost complete left radius (AD 115 '98), the so far only known postcranial remains belonging to this taxon.

== Description ==
Namafelis is comparable in size to a caracal or a large wildcat, making it significantly smaller than its relative Diamantofelis. It differs from its larger relative by possessing a p2, more complex structures on the talonid and the reduced height and transverse compression of the jugal teeth, and therefore less sectorial dentition. It has a strong, wide and well-developed masseteric fossa and a strong angular apophysis as well as a large alveolus for p2. The m1 differs from all other known felids and possesses a voluminous paraconid with a backward inclined anterior cusplet. No cingulum can be seen from a lingual view. Its protoconid is higher than its paraconid. As the lingual wall is eroded, it is not clear if it had a reduced metaconid, although there is no incision labially to suggest its presence. The well-developed talonid is occupied by an elliptical cusplet, which is surrounded by a relatively weak cingulum. The cusplet is joined more closely to the posterior cingulum than to the trigonid. Originally considered to be a metaconid, the position and size suggest that it belongs to the talonid. Compared to the p4, the p3 is anteriorly shortened, and it possesses a small incision separating the anterior cusplet from the main cusp, although it does not form an anterior cusp. The transversally compressed main cusp dominates the tooth, while the posterior cusplet is small, equal in size to the lingually well-developed posterior cingulum. The p4 is the most badly preserved tooth, and possesses an elongated anterior part, probably with some kind of anterior cusplet. A sharp, pointed cusp and a moderately sized, well-defined cingulum are located posteriorly.

Its radius is slightly shorter than that of the house cat, although the epiphysis is proportionally larger. The surface of the proximal end is elliptical and possesses a small notch in its lateral border, with a smooth and rather concave surface. Both anterior and posterior surfaces are quite smooth, lacking any detectable surfaces, although the former possesses a slightly concave border, while the posterior one is straight. In the middle of the proximal border of the slightly rugose lateral surface is a small notch. The development of the neck at the upper end of the diaphysis can be seen in lateral and medial views. It is more marked than in the house cat or the Iberian lynx. Furthermore, the rough tubercle located near the posterior margin of the proximal epiphysis is proportionally larger than in either species. The surface of the distal epiphysis is smooth, concave and subelliptical articular, with well-defined margins clearly separated from the rest of the epiphysis which possesses a rough surface. A well-defined crest runs proximally in the anterior surface, curving slightly medially. Below this process, a voluminous, slightly rugose tubercle is projecting distally. The posterior surface of the distal end has an elliptical facet for the ulna displaced towards the lateral margin, with its largest diameter antero-posterior axis of the distal epiphysis, and is very similar to other small felids. There is a rugose central part on the lateral surface of the bone, as well as a bulky, rugose, bony lamina, which is developed near the distal end of the diaphysis. The posterior border of the surface is rugose and projects posteriorly, thereby developing a constriction proximally. As in the house cat and Iberian lynx, the medial surface of the distal epiphysis is less developed than the lateral one. It is separated from the diaphysis by a strong crest, which is however weaker than in these extant species. The radial diaphysis is compressed medio-laterally and possesses a smooth lateral surface, with only a few rugosities. The medial surface is similar and its most distal part is slightly concave.

== Paleoecology ==
The locality of Arrisdrift likely represents a side channel of the Proto-Orange River, which was only occasionally filled with flowing water, perhaps when the river overflowed during the rainy season. The rest of the time it was a shallow pool. The presence of 'Crocodylus' gariepensis and giant tortoises indicate a more tropical climate than found in the area today. The habitat was probably a bushy, rather wooded savanna, with a gallery-forest along the river.

Here Namafelis coexisted with its larger relative Diamantofelis, as well as several more small and medium-sized carnivorans – the viverrid Orangictis, the stenoplesicitid Africanictis meini, the large mustelid Namibictis senuti and the hyainailourid Buhakia hyaenoides. All these species likely preyed on the various birds and small mammals of the locality, such as the macroscelidid Myohyrax, the springhare Megapedetes, the lagomorph Australagomys and the hoatzin-relative Namibiavis. The largest animals of Arrisdrift were the bear-dogs Namibiocyon ginsburgi and Amphicyon, the hyaenodont Hyainailouros, the climatoceratid Orangemeryx and the proboscideans Afromastodon and Prodeinotherium. Other inhabitants include the small suids Namachoerus and Nguruwe, the tragulid Dorcatherium, the diminutive aardvark Myorycteropus, the small bovid Namacerus and large hyrax Prohyrax.
