= Katifelis =

Katifelis Temporal range: Burdigalian, 17.5-16.8 Ma

Scientific classification
- Kingdom: Animalia
- Phylum: Chordata
- Class: Mammalia
- Order: Carnivora
- Family: Felidae
- Genus: †Katifelis; Adrian et al., 2018

Type species
- †Katifelis nightingalei Adrian et al., 2018

Extinct genus of small cat

Katifelis is an extinct genus of felids that lived in what is now Kenya during the Early Miocene and is notable for its dental features, which are intermediate between basal and modern cats. It contains a single species, Katifelis nightingalei.

== Discovery and naming ==
The holotype; and so far only fossil, of Katifelis was discovered at the locality Kalodirr, which is part of the Lothidok Formation. The site is dated to 17.5 ± 0.2 Ma – 16.8 ± 0.2 Ma and located in West Turkana, Kenya. The type specimen KNM-WK17133 is a left mandibular fragment, containing the teeth p1-m1. Described in 2018, it is the second felid with transitional traits known from Early Miocene Africa, alongside the slightly older Asilifelis. After the appearance of Katifelis during the late Burdigalian there are no fossil records of any African felids until the appearance of Machairodus around 12.5 Ma.

The generic name is a combination of Swahili Kati (“intermediate”), referencing its moderate size in comparison to its coeval relatives, and felis (“cat”). The species name honors Andrew Nightingale, a persistent supporter of geological and paleontological research in Kenya.

== Description ==
Katifelis is somewhat smaller than a caracal, and therefore, as its name suggests, intermediate in size between the smaller Asilifelis and the larger Namafelis and Diamantofelis. Its mandible is relatively gracile, and its p4 and m1 slightly overlapping. The m1 possesses a very tall protoconid, but a small paraconid. No metaconid is identifiable. Its talonid basin is low, narrow, flat, and quadrangular and the talonid cuspid very low. Its preprotocristid is well-defined, forming a buccal shearing edge, while the postprotocristid forms a broad slope lingually. The p4 main cusp is significantly taller than both any other feature of the tooth and the m1 paraconid. The p4 also possesses a small mesial accessory cuspid, which is lower than its distal one. The latter terminates in a small distal cingulum. A distinct knob is noticeable on the buccal side between the main cuspid and distal accessory cuspid. Overall, the p4 accessory cuspids are intermediate between modern “Felis-grade” and basal “Pseudaelurus-grade” forms.

Katifelis showcases several features differentiating it from other Burdigalian felids. Its dentition is more robust than that of Asilifelis, with more rounded p4 and m1 cuspids and a more gently sloped m1 postprotocristid. In comparison to Diamantofelis, it possesses a taller m1 protoconid relative to the paraconid, a p4 main cuspid that is lower than the m1 protoconid and a substantially dorsoventrally lower mandible. It also lacks a posterior cingulum on the m1 talonid, which is typical for Namafelis.

== Paleoecology ==
The paleoenvironment of Kalodirr was likely wooded, but relatively open, quite unlike that of similarly aged sites near Lake Victoria, which were covered by forest. Other carnivorans from this site include the bear-dog Cynelos macrodon, the viverrid Kichechia savagei and a large musteloid. They shared their habitat with a variety of thyronomyid rodents, the macroscelid Miosengi, primates such as Afropithecus, proboscideans including Prodeinotherium and Protanacus, rhinoceroses, tragulids and a unique assemblage of suids and giraffoids. The hyaenodonts Anasinopa, Isohyaenodon and possibly Hyainailourus are also present.

The Lothidok Formation showcases clear regional endemism among various groups, and the first appearance of several Eurasian taxa in sub-Saharan Africa.
