= Asilifelis =

Asilifelis Temporal range: Burdigalian

Scientific classification
- Kingdom: Animalia
- Phylum: Chordata
- Class: Mammalia
- Order: Carnivora
- Family: Felidae
- Genus: †Asilifelis; Werdelin, 2012

Type species
- †Asilifelis coteae Werdelin, 2012

Extinct genus of small cat

Asilifelis is an extinct genus of small felid that lived in what is now Kenya during the Early Miocene. Despite its fragmentary remains, it is remarkable because of its small size and advanced dentition. It contains a single species, Asilifelis cotae.

== Discovery and naming ==
Asilifelis is only known from a single specimen: KNM RU 18349, a mandibular ramus, including the well-preserved teeth p4-m1, which is stored in the National Museums of Kenya. The fossil was discovered in rocks of the Hiwegi Formation on Rusinga Island in 1949, but was subsequently only mentioned once in scientific literature until its description by Lars Werdelin in 2012.

The generic name is a combination of Swahili asili ("origin") and Latin felis ("cat"). The species name "coteae" honors Susanne Cote, who inspired Werdelin's interest in Miocene Africa.

== Description ==
Asilifelis is much smaller than other Early Miocene felids, comparable in size to the smallest extant species,⁣ such as the rusty-spotted cat, which weighs around 1-1.6 kg. Furthermore, its dentition is extremely modern in comparison to contemporary felids, being transitional between "Pseudaelurus-grade" and modern species. It possesses a slender p4, with a prominent cingulum and a tall main cusp, with a relative height greater than that of most extant and all coeval felids, comparable to that of the black-footed cat. The distal and mesial accessory cups are relatively low, whereas other Early Miocene cats possess larger accessory cups, which are more distinctly set off from the main cusp. However, they are also less appressed to the main cup than those of modern felids. The m1 is much taller than the premolar, although relatively shorter than in "Pseudaelurus-grade" forms, with strongly developed protoconid and paraconid. Both the anterior of the paracristid and posterior of the protocristid are nearly vertical. The talonid is noticeably reduced, being short and very low, while the metaconid is entirely absent. The distal end of the tooth possesses a short cingulum, which extends along its lingual side to the paraconids distal end. The p4 and m1 are somewhat overlapping.

== Evolutionary context ==
Most felids of the Burdigalian belong to a diversification of the so-called "Pseudaelurus-grade", basal species with primitive features, which are thought to have given rise to modern genera, with modern "Felis-grade" felids such as Pristifelis not appearing until 11.6 Ma. Therefore, the existence of a felid as derived as Asilifelis in Early Miocene rocks is surprising. It is possible that this African lineage was forced into a hypercarnivorous role much earlier than their Eurasian relatives due to competition with abundant viverrids and herpestids. It has also been speculated that it gave rise to modern felids, which could perhaps explain the sudden appearance of modern felines at the start of the Late Miocene in Eurasia. However, the limited material makes these conjectures impossible to confirm. Fossils of other Early Miocene African felids are limited, and mostly represented by the much larger "Pseudaelurus-grade" genera Diamantofelis and Namafelis. The distant relationship between these forms and Asilifelis potentially suggests two separate dispersal events of felids into Africa during the Early Miocene. Furthermore, Katifelis nightingalei, another species with similar transitional features, was described from slightly younger rocks of the Kenyan Lothidok Formation in 2018. Other felids are not known from the continent until the sudden appearance of forms such as Machairodus around 12.5 Ma. An explanation for this gap in the fossil record might be that they primarily inhabited poorly sampled habitats, or alternatively were excluded from these ecosystems by the diversity of small viverrids and herpestids.

== Paleoecology ==
The Fossil Bed Member of the Hiwegi Formation, where Asilifelis was found, likely represents a woodland or mosaic forest. The fossil assemblage is rich and includes a high diversity of rodents from various families, as well as other small mammals such as tenrecs, elephant shrews and hedgehogs. Carnivores of similar size to Asilifelis are represented by the viverrids Herpestides and Kichechia, and the hyaenodont Exiguodon, while larger predators include the barbourofelid Afrosmilus, the bear-dog Cynelos as well as a variety of hyaenodonts such as Hyainailourus and Dissopsalis. A large number of primates are also present, among them the early ape Ekembo. Asilifelis furthermore coexisted with a variety of rhinoceroses, proboscideans such as Prodeinotherium, several pig species, early giraffes and the crocodylians Euthecodon and Brochuchus.
