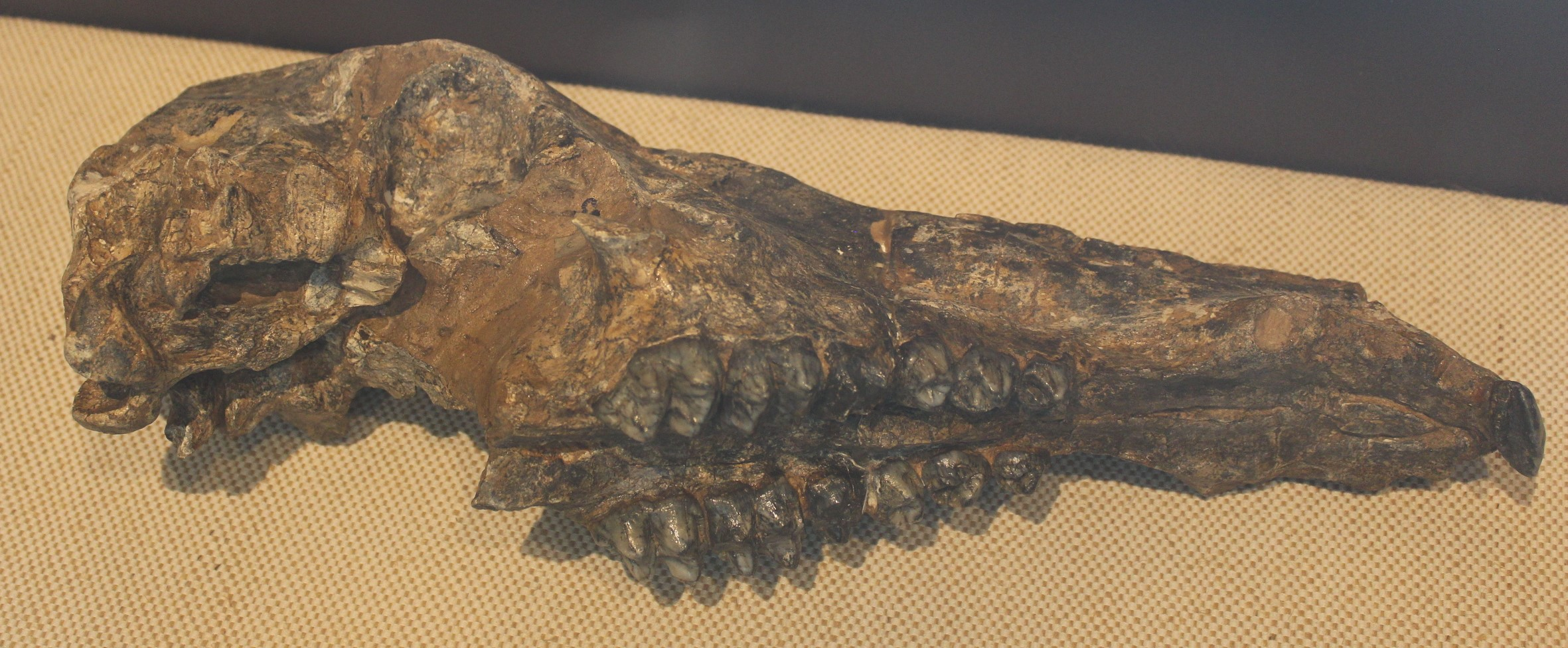
- Skull (IVPP V8285) of L. splendens, Paleozoological Museum of China

Scientific classification
- Kingdom: Animalia
- Phylum: Chordata
- Class: Mammalia
- Order: Artiodactyla
- Family: Suidae
- Subfamily: †Listriodontinae
- Tribe: †Listriodontini
- Genus: †Listriodon von Meyer, 1846

Type species
- †Listriodon splendens von Meyer, 1846

Species
- See text

= Listriodon =

Listriodon Temporal range: Miocene

Extinct genus of mammals

Listriodon is an extinct genus of pig-like animals that lived in Eurasia during the Miocene.

== Description ==
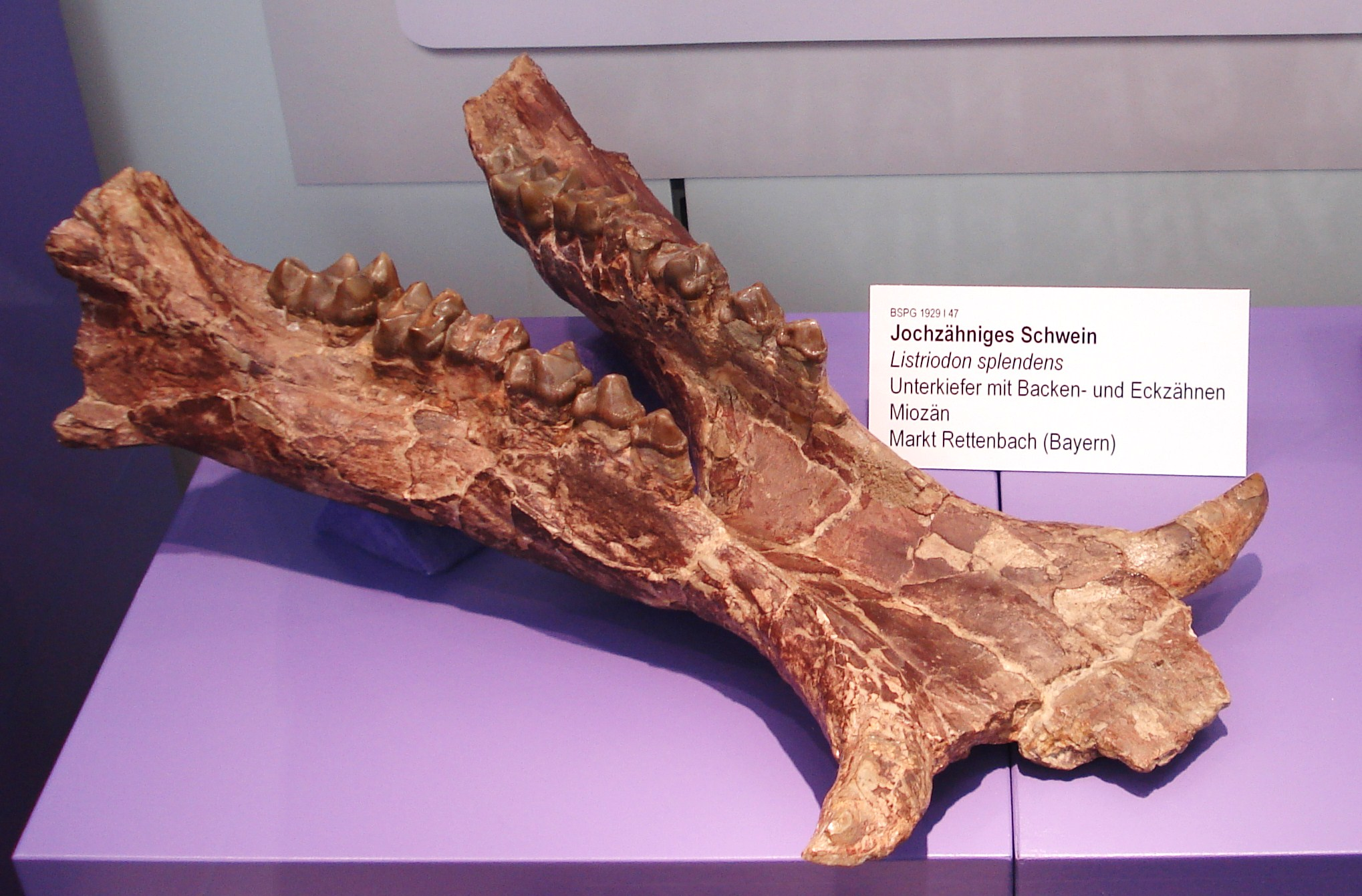
Mandible of L. splendens

Listriodon species were generally small in size. In morphology, they show many similarities with peccaries rather than modern pigs.

The lophodont teeth of Listriodon indicate that it was mostly, if not strictly, herbivorous. Peculiarly, their teeth resemble those of perissodactyls such as horses more than they do that of ruminants. This was the case because unlike ruminants (and much like perissodactyls), pigs lack a complex four-chambered stomach and therefore had to rely on their teeth to break down grasses and herbs.

== Species ==
Many species of Listriodon have been named over the years, to the point that the genus became a wastebasket taxon. Over the years, many species have been moved into new genera, such as Kubanochoerus, Bunolistriodon and Lopholistriodon. Some species were found to be synonymous with others, such as Listriodon theobaldi and Listriodon pentapotamiae representing different genders of a single species.

Prothero (2021) lists four valid species:

- Listriodon splendens
- Listriodon pentapotamiae
- Listriodon raetamanensis
- Listriodon bartuensis

In 2022, Listriodon dukkar was described on the basis of fossils from Gujarat. The authors suggest that it was a descendant of Listriodon pentapotamiae.

=== Species now placed in Bunolistriodon ===
- Listriodon akatikubas
- Listriodon guptai
- Listriodon intermedius
- Listriodon latidens
- Listriodon lockharti
- Listriodon meidamon

=== Species now placed in Lopholistriodon ===
- Listriodon juba

=== Species now placed in Kubanochoerus ===
- Listriodon robustus

=== Species synonymous with L. splendens ===
- Listriodon aragoniensis
- Listriodon mongoliensis
- Listriodon lishanensis
- Listriodon xinanensis

=== Species synonymous with L. pentapotamiae ===
- Listriodon theobaldi

== Palaeobiology ==
=== Palaeoecology ===
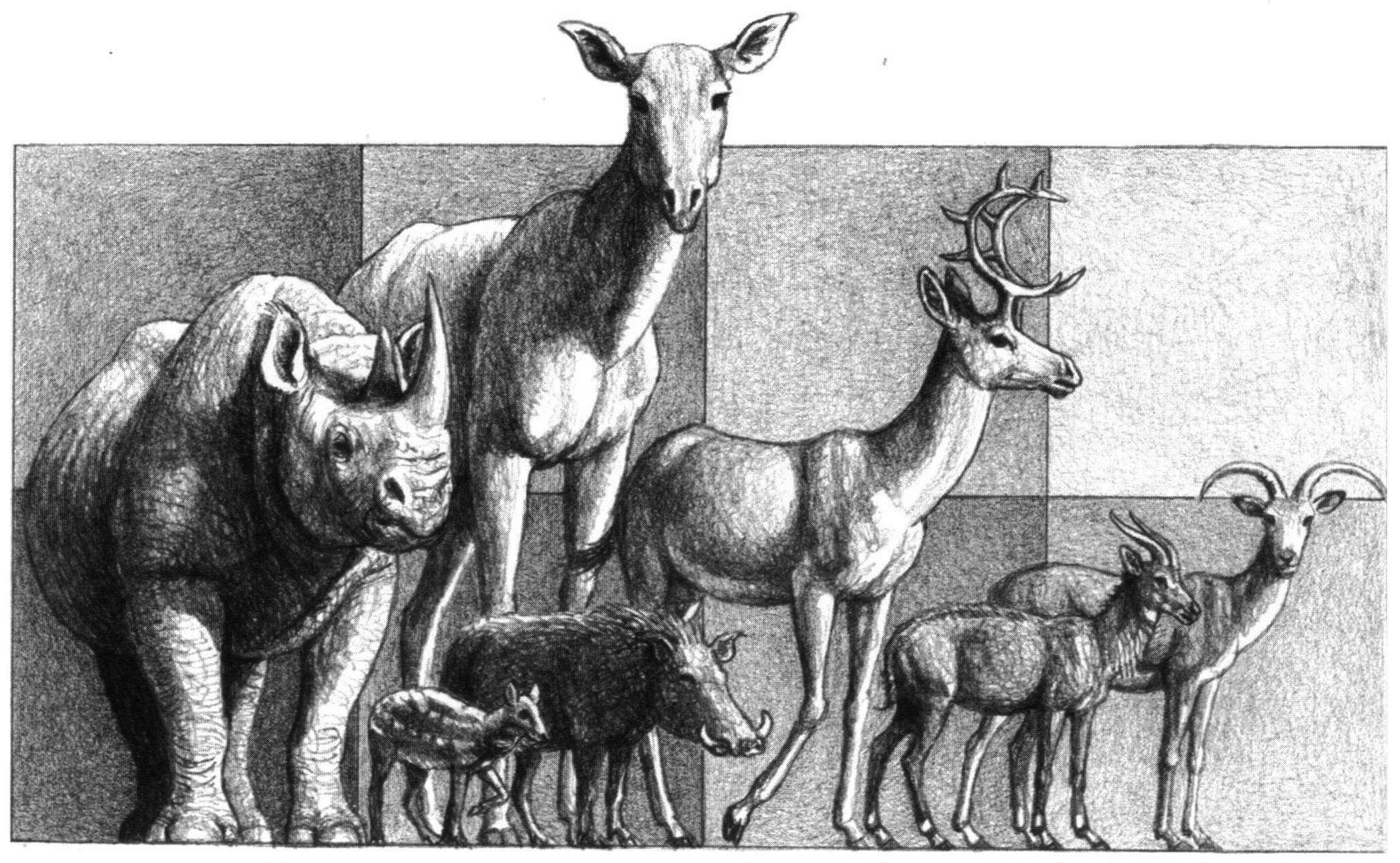
Eastern African mid-Miocene ungulates, including Listriodon

Multiproxy isotopic analysis of the tooth enamel of L. splendens consisting of ^{87}Sr/^{86}Sr, δ^{18}O_{CO3}, and δ^{13}C suggests that although it was primarily a browser, it consumed significant quantities of fruit and at times also fed on grass. Analysis of dental morphology and microwear of L. cf. L. splendens and L. aff. L. latidens suggests that the former was a more specialised folivore than the latter.

Unlike modern suids, Listriodon does not seem to have been adapted to rooting, and they likely did not complement their diet with animals living in the soil. Their broad snout suggest that they were bulk feeders, that were not particularly selective in their choice of leaves. Their ecological role has been compared to modern tapirs.

=== Palaeopathology ===
At the Middle Miocene site of Chabbar Syedan in Pakistan, only two specimens of L. pentapotamiae showed signs of enamel hypoplasia out of twenty-four sampled suids, suggesting that this palaeoenvironment was stable and characterised by minimal environmental disruptions.

=== Extinction ===
Listriodonts disappear at the start of the Late Miocene. The youngest known Listriodon occurrence from India date to circa 9.8 Ma, and in Europe, to 9.78 Ma, close to the end of the MN Zone 9. The last known members of the subfamily in Africa, possibly belonging to Lopholistriodon akatidobus, vanish at around the same time. This is slightly before the Vallesian Crisis, which is associated with a global decrease of temperature, the disappearance of hominoids from western and central Europe, as well as a disruption of the European suid assemblage. Before, up to eight different suids were contemporaneous in Europe, with up to five coexisting at the same site, whereas after the crisis, there were no more than two coexisted at any given site. It has been suggested that the change of environment in Europe and western Asia, from a humid subtropical climate to a drier, more seasonal one, led to a decreased availability of food for Listriodon splendens, and therefore to its extinction. The Indian subcontinent also saw a turnover of the suoids, around 10.3 Ma, though this predates the final extinction of Listriodon dukkar, and diversity of the suoids remained much higher than in Europe. Regardless, there was an increasing shift towards a more open landscape and deciduous vegetation, which likely resulted in the disappearance of Listriodon dukkar. A similar shift is observed in the ruminant fauna, with tragulids becoming rarer, while bovids became more common. It has been suggested that their initial success of listriodonts during the middle Miocene was linked to high pCO_{2} in the atmosphere, with their extinction coinciding with a drop in pCO_{2} content. As likely hindgut fermenters, they were more efficient in their consumption of proteins than modern suines, though less efficient in processing sugars. Drops in pCO_{2} are linked to a decrease of sugar contents in leaves and fruits, though higher contents of iron, zink, and proteins, and this change may have negatively affected listriodonts, and led to their extinction.
