= Megalochoerus =

Megalochoerus Temporal range: Early to Middle Miocene (Burdigalian to Langhian), 17.2–14.8 Ma

Scientific classification
- Kingdom: Animalia
- Phylum: Chordata
- Class: Mammalia
- Order: Artiodactyla
- Family: Suidae
- Tribe: †Kubanochoerini
- Genus: †Megalochoerus; Pickford, 1993

Type species
- †Megalochoerus homungous Pickford, 1993

Species
- M. homungous? Pickford, 1993; M. khinzikebirus Wilkinson, 1976; M. marymuunguae van der Made, 1996

Extinct genus of mammal

Megalochoerus is an extinct genus of large and long-legged suids from the Miocene of Africa and parts of Asia. The genus first appeared in the Early Miocene with the species M. khizikebirus. It was thought to have been a herbivore with a diet mainly consisting of fruits, leafy branches, and tree barks.

== Taxonomy ==
The species M. khinzikebirus and M. marymuunguae were once considered to belong to the related Kubanochoerus or Libycochoerus, but have since been reassigned to Megalochoerus. However, some experts over the recent years have reclassified M. khinzikebirus and M. marymuunguae as an African species of Kubanochoerus. M. homungous is considered synomous to Kubanochoerus mancharensis, with some experts favoring Kubanochoerus mancharensis over M. homungous.

Megalochoerus marymuuguae was the smallest and earliest of the three species, while M. homungous was the latest occurring and largest.

== Description ==
Megalochoerus contained some of the largest suids ever known to exist. Pickford & Morales (2003) originally compared the size of M. khinzikebirus, intermediate between the other two species, to a hippopotamus, with M. homungous, the largest species of the genus, being even larger, as big as a gomphothere. Pickford (2006) estimated that based on dental morphology, the weight of M. khinzikebirus was originally estimated to have been as high as 1,104 kg (2,434 lb). However, the dimensions of its distal humerus indicate that it was considerably smaller. As the articulation of the distal humeral in this species was 60 mm, compared to 40 mm in modern wild boars, upscaling from the latter results in mass estimates of 303–675 kg (668–1,488 lb) when using the average and max weight of wild boars respectively.

== Paleobiology ==
=== Diet ===
Kubanochoeres, including Megalochoerus, were considered to have been herbivorous. (Note: Pickford (2006) referred Megalochoerus as a omnivore, however this was likely an error on their behalf as they noted the similarities of the dentition of Megalochoerus and gomphotheres) Pickford (2006) noted that the bunodont nature of the cheek dentition of Megalochoerus was similar to that of gomphotheres, suggesting Megalochoerus had a diet that consisted of fruits, leafy branches, and tree barks but avoided grasses and underground resources. Carbon isotopic analysis within Buluk, Kenya, suggested M. marymuunguae either selected plants or plant parts that were enriched with δ^{13}C or foraged in more open canopy.
