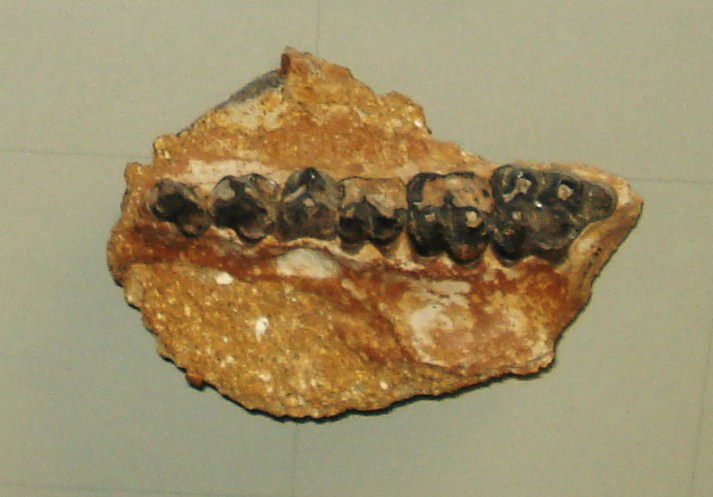
- Bunolistriodon fossil

Scientific classification
- Kingdom: Animalia
- Phylum: Chordata
- Class: Mammalia
- Order: Artiodactyla
- Family: Suidae
- Subfamily: †Listriodontinae
- Genus: †Bunolistriodon; Arambourg, 1933

Type species
- †Bunolistriodon lockharti Pomel, 1848

Species
- B. akatikubas; B. guptai; B. intermedius; B. latidens; B. lockharti; B. meidamon

= Bunolistriodon =

Bunolistriodon Temporal range: Miocene

Extinct genus of mammals

Bunolistriodon is an extinct genus of pig-like animals from Eurasia and Africa during the Miocene.

The exact position of Bunolistriodon has been subject to debate. It has been considered a synonym of Listriodon in the past, and sometimes still is. However, today most authorities recognize the genus as distinct.
