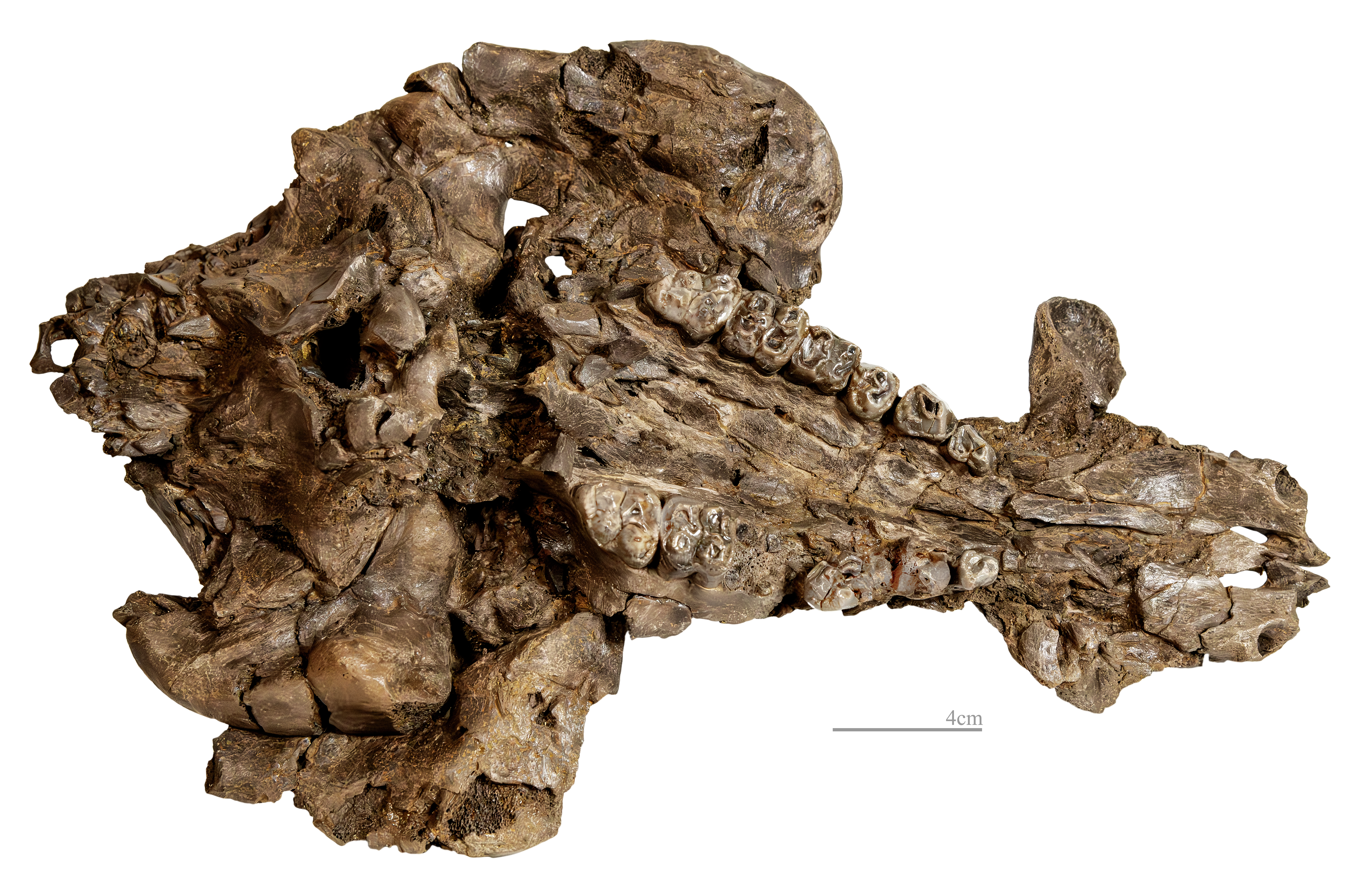
- Eurolistriodon tenarezensis - Skull - lower face Holotype MHNT

Scientific classification
- Kingdom: Animalia
- Phylum: Chordata
- Class: Mammalia
- Order: Artiodactyla
- Family: Suidae
- Subfamily: †Listriodontinae
- Tribe: †Listriodontini
- Genus: †Eurolistriodon; Orliac, 2006

Type species
- †Eurolistriodon adelli Pickford & Moya-Sola, 1995

Species
- E. adelli; E. tenarezensis

= Eurolistriodon =

Extinct genus of mammals

Eurolistriodon was an extinct genus of even-toed ungulates that existed during the Miocene in Europe.

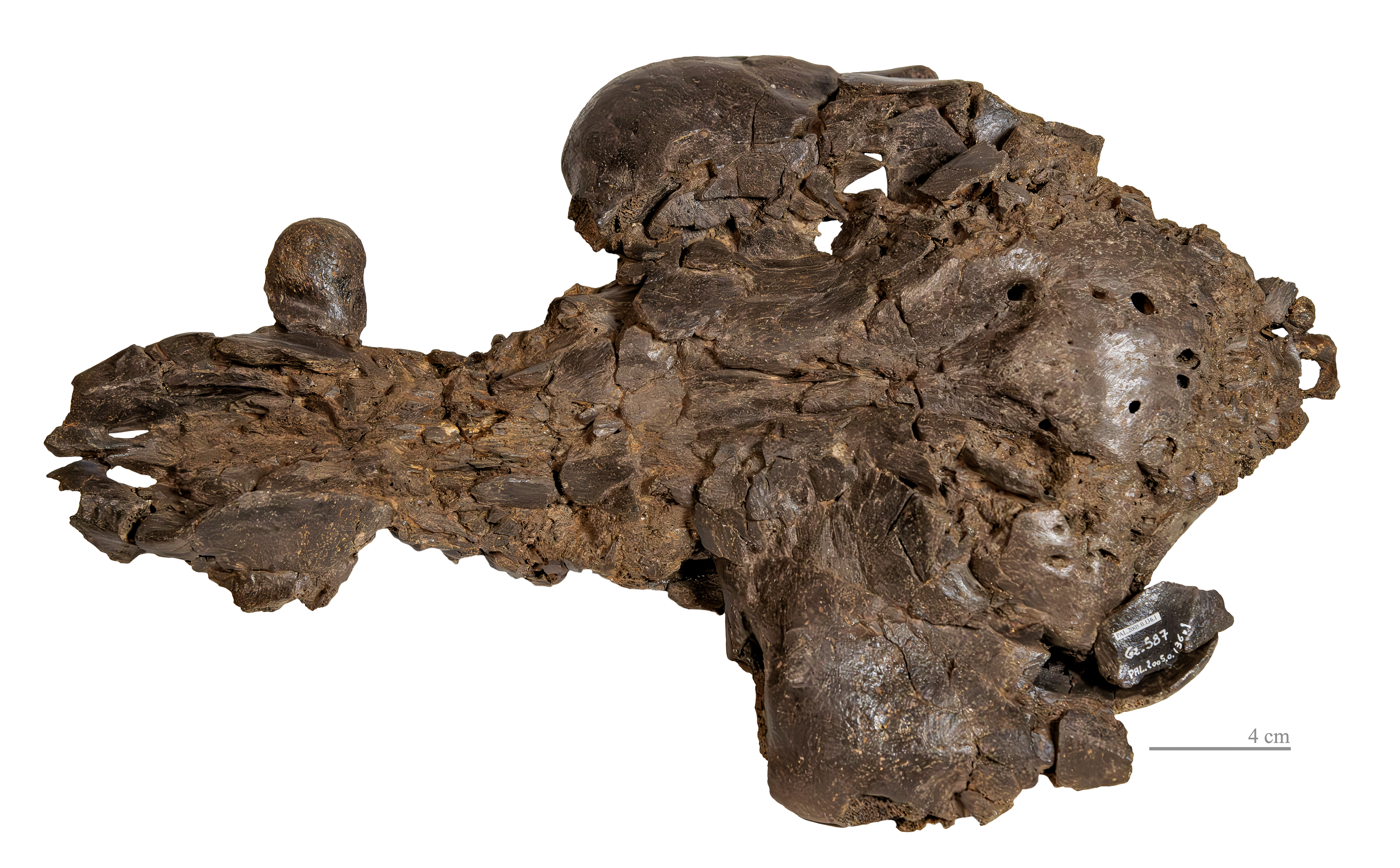
Eurolistriodon tenarezensis - Skull upper face Holotype MHNT

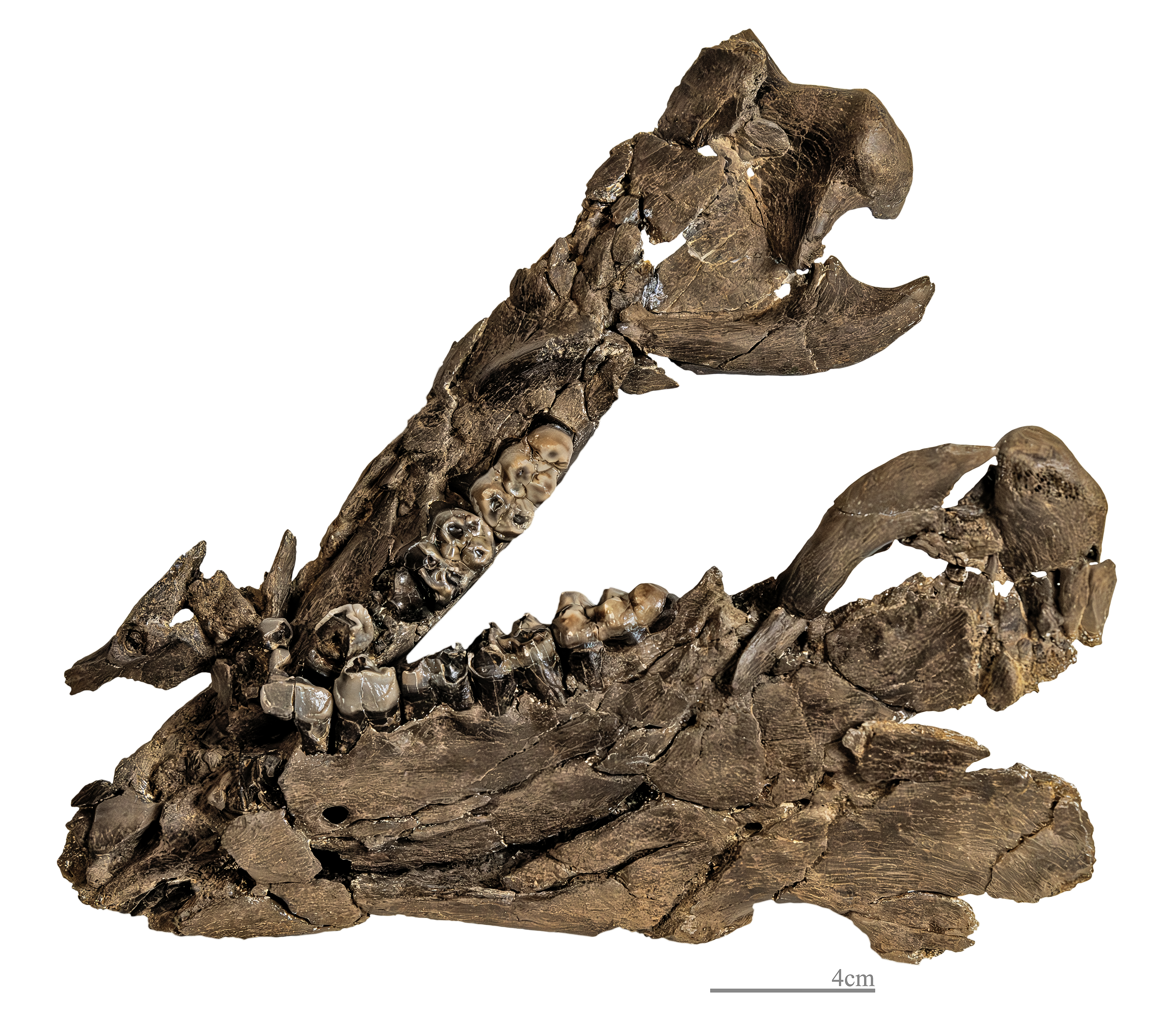
Eurolistriodon tenarezensis - Mandible Holotype MHNT
