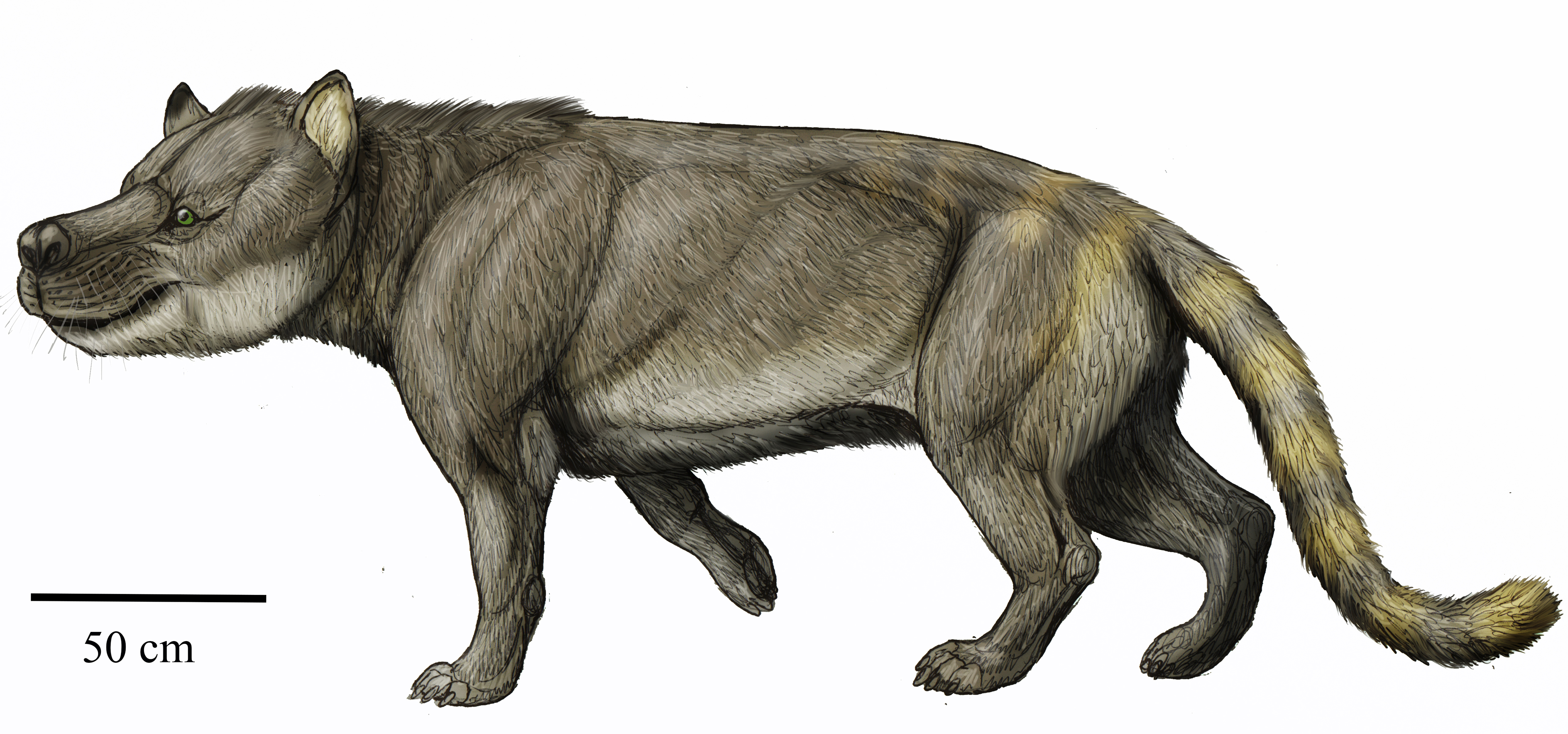
- Life restoration

Scientific classification
- Kingdom: Animalia
- Phylum: Chordata
- Class: Mammalia
- Order: †Hyaenodonta
- Family: †Hyainailouridae
- Subfamily: †Hyainailourinae
- Genus: †Megistotherium; Savage, 1973

Type species
- †Megistotherium osteothlastes Savage, 1973

Synonyms
- synonyms of species: M. osteothlastes: Hyainailouros osteothlastes (Morales & Pickford, 2017)

= Megistotherium =

Megistotherium Temporal range: Early to Middle Miocene (Aquitanian to Serravallian) 22.5–12.0 Ma Possible Late Miocene records

Extinct genus of mammal

Megistotherium ("greatest beast") is an extinct genus of very large hyaenodont belonging to the family Hyainailouridae that lived in Africa and possibly Asia during the early-middle Miocene epoch, with possible earliest late Miocene records. The first specimen, a near-complete skull, was discovered in 1963 by Robert J. G. Savage in Libya, and was kept at the Natural History Museum in London alongside postcrania discovered in the prior few years. In 1973, Savage described Megistotherium based on these elements, with the skull serving as the type specimen. It was later determined that the assigned postcrania actually came from an amphicyonid, or "bear-dog". One species of Megistotherium, M. osteothlastes, has been described. There is some debate over whether Megistotherium is a genus of its own or a junior synonym of another, related genus, Hyainailouros.

Due to the paucity of material assigned to Megistotherium, size estimates for the genus have varied considerably over the years. The estimate put forward by Savage was 880 kg (1,940 lb). Later efforts have produced estimates ranging from 500–3,002 kg (1,102–6,618 lb), as varying estimates have yielded considerably different results. However, given an apparent upper size limit of 1,100 kg (2,400 lb) for mammalian carnivores due to energetic demands, and the issues with applying size estimates to such fragmentary material, the highest estimates appear unlikely. Regardless, Megistotherium was very large, with a skull measuring 66.4 cm (26.1 in) from front to back, and 47.1 cm (18.5 in) on either side. The number of upper incisors had been reduced to just one, and its upper canines were very large, to such a degree that the front of the snout had expanded outwards to accommodate them. Megistotherium had a very powerful bite force, as evidenced by the size of its zygomatic (cheek) arches and its large sagittal crest. At the same time, it had a very large gape.

Remains assigned to Megistotherium have been discovered in Namibia, Uganda, Kenya, Libya, Egypt, and Pakistan. There is some faunal overlap between some of these localities, such as the Gebel Zelten of Libya and the Moghara of Egypt, and it is likely that Megistotherium would have hunted similar prey across its range. Due to its large body size, strong bite force, and large gape, Megistotherium may have specialised in large prey, such as proboscideans (elephants and their relatives). Some experts have argued that its extinction may correlate to declines in the populations of these animals, due to the amount of time it takes large mammalian herbivores to breed, as well as being outcompeted by the larger-brained and allegedly more social carnivorans. However, this is questionable as studies have found little evidence of brain size and sociality among carnivorans and as most carnivorans are not social animals, with habitats being unfavorable for pack hunting in Africa during the Early and Middle Miocene.

== Taxonomy ==
=== Early history ===
The Gebel Zelten locality in Libya was first discovered in 1931 by the Italian scientific mission to Kufra. Starting in 1962, a series of geologic expeditions were carried out at the site, with some, such as R. C. Selley's 1963 expedition, being aimed at studying stratigraphy and sedimentology, and others, such as the expeditions of Robert J. G. Savage, being aimed toward the discovery of vertebrate fossils. The first remains of an unknown large predator were discovered in 1962 and 1963 by prospectors. In 1964, during his first expedition, Savage would himself come upon scattered postcranial fragments from such an animal. Only two years later, he discovered the complete skull of a large predatory mammal, specifically a hyaenodont, at a site designated Site 6412, in the southeast corner of the locality. The specimen was catalogued as M.26173 and found its way into the collections of the British Museum of Natural History (now the Natural History Museum, London). In 1973, described both the skull and various other cranial and skull elements, assigning them to a new genus and species of hyaenodont which he named Megistotherium osteothlates; M.26173 was designated as the holotype. Savage believed that several other specimens, such as the very large mandible M.12049 from the Bugti Hills of Pakistan (originally attributed to Anthracotherium), might have belonged to Megistotherium. The postcranial remains assigned to Megistotherium have since been reinterpreted as belonging to an amphicyonid. Remains assigned to Megistotherium have also been described from the Ngorora and Muruyur Formations of Kenya, Egypt, Namibia, and Uganda. A partial right mandible (lower jaw) assigned to the genus, catalogued as DPC 6611 and discovered in strata from the Moghara Formation of Egypt, was described in 1989.

The generic name of Megistotherium comes from Ancient Greek μέγιστον (mégiston) 'greatest' and from Ancient Greek θήριον (thēríon) 'beast'. The species name, osteothlastes, meanwhile, comes from Ancient Greek ὀστέον (ostéon) 'bone' the and from Ancient Greek θλᾰστός (thlastos) 'crushed' or 'bruised' (with -es being an agent noun: 'bone-crusher').

=== Taxonomy ===
Megistotherium belongs to the subfamily Hyainailourinae, part of the hyainailourid lineage of hyaenodonts. The family Hyainailouridae comprised a diverse group of hyaenodonts that were most successful during the Eocene before being possibly ecologically displaced by the order Carnivora during the late Oligocene. A relationship between M. osteothlastes and Hyainailouros was noted by Savage, who regarded them as "closely allied" with one another. Savage believed that the radiation of large mid-Tertiary hyaenodonts could be encompassed within three genera: Hyainailouros, Megistotherium, and Pterodon.

The cladogram below is based on the results recovered by Matthew R. Borths and Nancy J. Stevens (2019):

- Hyainailourinae
  - - Falcatodon schlosseri
    - - Simbakubwa kutokaafrika
      - - - Hyainailouros sulzeri
          - Arrisdrift hyainailourine
        - - Hyainailouros napakensis
          - - Isohyaenodon andrewsi
            - - Sivapterodon
              - Hyainailouros bugtiensis
  - - - Megistotherium osteothlastes
      - Leakitherium hiwegi
    - - - Mlanyama sugu
        - Megapterodon kaiseri
      - - Isohyaenodon zadoki
        - Exiguodon pilgrimi

The validity of Megistotherium has been questioned by several authors, who suggest that it is actually a junior synonym of Hyainailouros. However, other studies have maintained M. osteothlastes as a separate taxon based on dental characteristics and body size, and others still have done so as a conservative measure; David Tab Rasmussen and colleagues suggested that they may have shared a common ancestor, perhaps a species of Pterodon like P. africanus. The matter is complicated by the paucity of dentition in M. osteothlastes.

== Description ==
Megistotherium is one of the largest hyaenodonts, though the lack of postcranial elements means that its body size is difficult to determine. Body mass estimates for the genus have thus varied. In his 1973 description of M. osteothlastes, Savage used the distal width of an assigned humerus and that of brown bears to provide a lower estimate of 760 kg (1,680 lb) ratio of brain weight/body weight to provide an upper estimate of 1,000 kg (2,200 lb). However, as hyaenodonts have particularly large heads compared to other large carnivorous mammals, he believed that the lower estimate was too low and the upper estimate was too high, thus settling on an intermediate of 880 kg (1,940 lb). In 2008, B. Sorkin provided a body mass estimate of 500 kg (1,100 lb) for M. osteothlastes. In 2019, Borth and Stevens used three different methods to determine body masses for various hyaenodonts. The first, using an equation derived from the length of the third lower premolar in various mid-sized and large carnivorans, recovered a mass of 317 kg (699 lb). The second and third used comparisons between the third molar lengths in hyaenodonts and felids, and yielded mass estimates of 1,794–3,002 kg (3,955–6,618 lb). However, the paucity of remains for M. osteothlastes and the necessary use of anatomical proxies poses inherent issues for body mass estimates, and given the abnormal proportions of hyaenodonts, upper estimates may be very unreliable. Furthermore, body size would have been constrainted by energetic demands; in 2007, Chris Carbone, Amber Teacher, and J. Marcus Rowcliffe suggested a maximum size limit for carnivorous mammals of about 1,100 kg (2,400 lb).

=== Skull ===
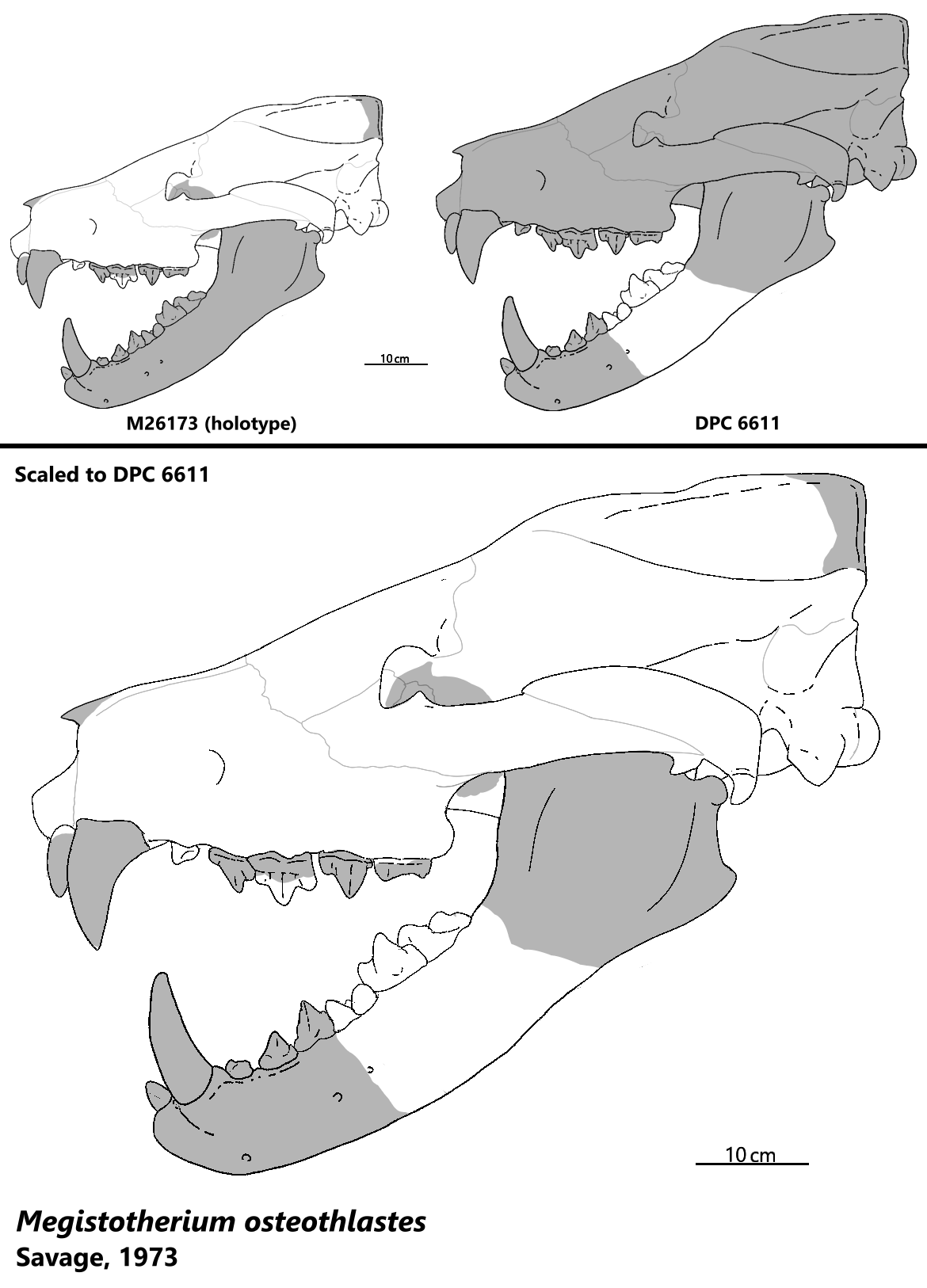
Cranial elements from two Megistotherium specimens (top), and a composite scaled to the larger of the two (bottom). Known elements in white, unknown elements in grey

The skull of Megistotherium was very large and heavily built. It had a condylobasal length (measured from the anterior, or front, portion of the premaxilla to the posterior, or rear, portion of the occipital condyles) of 66.4 cm (26.1 in), and a width when measured from the tip of each zygomatic arch of 47.1 cm (18.5 in). The fact that few tooth crowns are preserved, and the presence of areas deformed by bone disease, suggest that the holotype was very old when it died. The anterior portion of M. osteothlastes' maxilla is expanded laterally (outward) to accommodate a very large upper canine. The palate was V-shaped, very narrow at the level of the first upper premolar, yet very wide posterior to the third upper molar. M. osteothlestes' nasals appear to have extended as far posteriorly as the postorbital process of the frontal bone. Its nasal opening was fairly high and wide. The jugal bones are well-preserved, with large infraorbital tubercles. They contributed anteriorly to a very large zygomatic arch. The sagittal crest of M. osteothlastes was the largest known from any taxon at the time, around 30 cm (12 in) long and 15 cm (5.9 in) high, partly due to the reduced size of the braincase. The wide zygomatic arches and high sagittal crest of M. osteothlastes suggest that its temporalis muscles were very large, to the point where Savage suggested they may have weighed around 10 kg (22 lb) apiece. The zygomatic arches are not particularly robust, suggesting that the temporalis was the primary jaw-closing muscle, as in many carnivorous taxa, as opposed to the masseter. The occipital region had a trefoil shape, with a circular foramen magnum with a diameter of 3.5 cm (1.4 in). The basisphenoid was extraordinarily robust, forming a solid wedge where the sphenoids and squamosals articulated, preventing them and the brain itself being damaged by the powerful jaw muscles. Like with Hyaenodon, M. osteothlastes had no alisphenoid canal, and the carotid artery would have lay in a shallow groove running along the alar process. As in other hyaenodonts, a tympanic bulla appears to have been absent. The mandible (lower jaw) of Megistotherium is known from a fragment of the right mandiblular ramus. The mandible was very deep and bowed.

==== Brain anatomy ====
The brain anatomy of Megistotherium is known from an endocast of the holotype. Its overall structure was similar to that of Hyaenodon and Pterodon, though far larger and "rather more complex". The volume of what is known of the brain was about 280 cubic centimetres (cc), although since the olfactory lobes and the anterior part of the cerebellum are missing, it may have exceeded 400 cc in its totality. The cerebrum bore a series of four well-developed sulci, traversed by blood vessels which gave it an appearance likened to a checkerboard. The cerebellum is very large, occupying around a quarter of the total volume of the brain, and is divided into vermis and two distinct lateral lobes. A 2019 study found estimated, assuming Megistotherium weighed 313 kg (690 lb), it had a low EQ score of 0.24-0.29. A 2021 study found a higher EQ score of 0.49-0.61, assuming it weighed 313–432 kg (690–952 lb). However, the low EQ scores of Megistotherium may have been due to the failure of Jerison's EQ regression taking into account brain sizes for high body mass.

=== Dentition ===
The upper dentition of Megistotherium is poorly preserved, though it can be determined that unlike other hyaenodonts, there was only one upper incisor (probably the third). Both of the upper canines are missing, although the size of the relevant alveolus (tooth socket) and the expansion of the maxilla to accommodate it suggest that it was very large and deep-rooted. The first upper premolar was single-rooted. The rest of the cheek teeth were arranged in more or less a straight line, though the skull was structured in such a way that, were this line to somehow continue to the tip of the skull, it would pass directly through the opposite incisor. The second upper premolar was single-rooted, and had a crown longer than it was broad, thick enamel, a keel on its posterior surface. Overall it resembled that of modern hyenas. The second upper premolar was set apart from the teeth immediately before and after it by small diastema (gaps), whereas the teeth posterior to it formed a tight series with no diastemas. Only the roots of the third upper premolars survive, with three per molar. The molars are not known, aside from the root of the first. The lower dentition is better preserved, coming from the DPC 6611, the mandible recovered in Egypt. The fourth lower premolar differed from that of other hyaenodonts in being oriented obliquely in relation to the mandible, and from Hyainailouros in having a small hypoconid. The first lower molar is very small compared to that of Hyaenodon and Pterodon, and lacked differentiated cusps and crests. The second and third premolars were similar to those of most hyaenodonts, though differed from those of Apterodon in having blade-like paraconids and small hypoconids. The shape of Megistotherium's tooth crowns suggests that at least some were adapted to slicing, as with other large hyaenodonts. The upper canines of Megistotherium were large with a massive root, being over twice the size of the crown. The crown is oval in nature in the section and the enamel was smooth.

== Palaeobiology ==
As far back as the original description of the genus, Robert J. G. Savage suggested that Megistotherium hunted prey larger than its own body size. Noting that it had a high bite force in spite of possessing a relatively long snout, he proposed that this may have been an adaptation for hunting large game. Assuming a gape similar to that of modern big predators, specifically lions and tigers (around 50°), Savage suggested that M. osteothlastes would have had a gap of around 30 cm (12 in), enough to bite down around the leg of some modern elephants. The reduction in incisor count would have minimised the damage which could be inflicted by struggling prey. Savage hypothesised that M. osteothlastes may have predated heavily upon proboscideans, such as Gomphotherium and Prodeinotherium, due to how common they were in that locality. In 1989, David Tab Rasmussen and colleagues suggested that large hyaenodonts like M. osteothlastes may have specialised in large taxa such as proboscideans.

== Palaeoecology ==
In Africa, large hyainailourines were widespread but never abundant in the fossil record. Within North Africa, Megistotherium is known from both the Moghara and Jebel Zelten localities. Moghara Formation was part of a large river system that trended from southeast to northwest combined with episodic marine transgressions trending in the opposite direction. The presence of suids with bunodont dentition indicates the presence of relatively closed vegetation habitats. Within Wadi Moghara, Megistotherium coexisted with terrestrial mammalian predators such as hyaenodonts such as Buhakia moghraensis and hyainailourine Hyainailouros, carnivorans such as hyaena and amphicyonids such as Mogharacyon anubisi and Amphicyon giganteus. Mammalian herbivores present in this locality include rhinoceroses such as Aceratherium and Brachypotherium snowi, the prolibytheriid Prolibytherium magnieri, anthracotheres such as Brachyodus and Masritherium depereti, primates such as Dryopithecus mogharensis and Prohylobates tandyi, and proboscideans such as the gomphothere Gomphotherium, the choerolophodontid Afrochoerodon kisumuensis, the amebelodont Archaeobelodon, and mammutids such as Mastodon spenceri and Zygolophodon aegyptensis. Cetaceans such as Schizodelphis sulcatus and Delphinus vanzelleri were also present. Contemporary reptiles include gavialids such as Sutekhsuchus dowsoni and Gavialis, the crocodile Rimasuchus lloydi, the varanid Varanus, the tortoise Namibchersus namaquensis, and pocnemid such as Podocnemis bramlyi, Mogharemys blanckenhorni, Latentemys plowdeni, and Apeshemys aegyptiaca.

Jebel Zelten was reconstructed to have been a coastal fluviatile environment that was lagoonal with estuarine deposits, and consisted of low-lying swamps. The faunal commonalities between Wadi Moghara and Jebel and Zelten may be the result of geographic or temporal proximity.

== Extinction ==
The youngest known remains tentatively assigned to Megistotherium come from the Ngorora Formation and have been dated to the late Middle Miocene, around 12.5 to 12 Ma. However, records in Pakistan may suggest that Megistotherium persisted into the Late Miocene, going extinct around 11.4 Ma. While many hyainailouroids went extinct because the inability to adapt to open environments, a few, such as Megistotherium, persisted.

It has been argued by some workers that the extinction of large hyainailourines may have more to do with the loss of large herbivores and competition with social carnivorans. However, studies have found little to no correlation sociality with brain sizes among carnivorans, with relative anterior brain volume being a much stronger indicator of sociality. Due to the absence of canids (who dispersed into Africa by the latest Miocene), pack hunting is difficult determine among carnivorans in Early Miocene Africa. Furthermore, vegetation in the Early Miocene was generally more closed, preventing pack hunting and high-speed chases from being effective.
