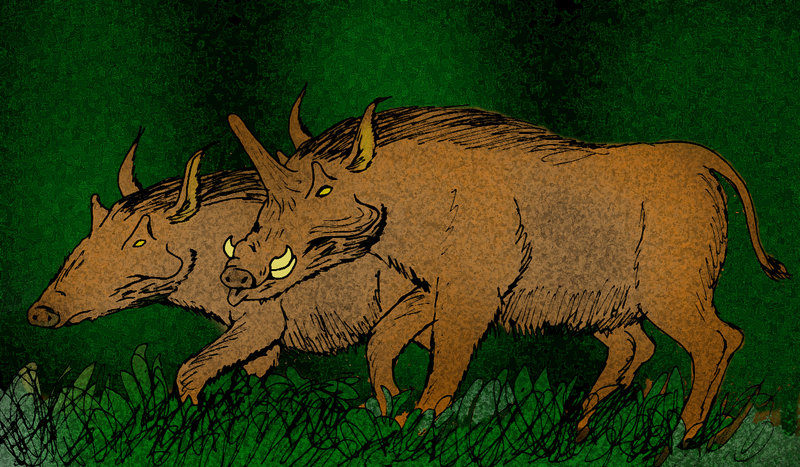
- Kubanochoerus gigas

Scientific classification
- Kingdom: Animalia
- Phylum: Chordata
- Class: Mammalia
- Order: Artiodactyla
- Family: Suidae
- Subfamily: †Listriodontinae; Simpson, 1945

Subgroups
- Kubanochoerini; Kubanochoerus; Kubwachoerus; Libycochoerus; Megalochoerus; Listriodontini; Bunolistriodon; Eurolistriodon; Listriodon; Namachoerini; Lopholistriodon; Namachoerus

= Listriodontinae =

Listriodontinae Temporal range: Miocene

Extinct subfamily of mammals

Listriodontinae was an extinct subfamily of even-toed ungulates that existed during the Miocene in Europe, Africa, and Asia.
