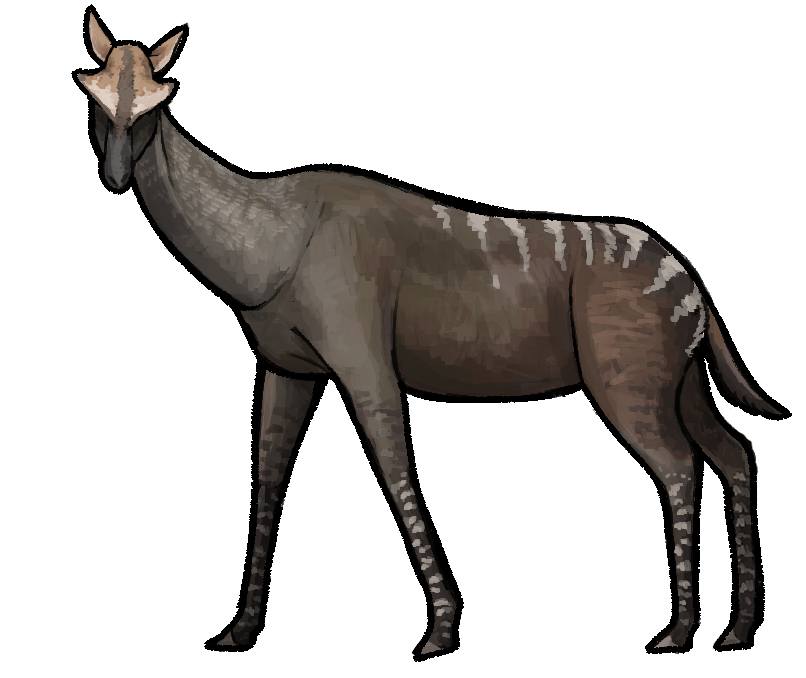
- Restoration of Canthumeryx sirtensis

Scientific classification
- Kingdom: Animalia
- Phylum: Chordata
- Class: Mammalia
- Order: Artiodactyla
- Family: Giraffidae
- Genus: †Canthumeryx; Hamilton, 1973

= Canthumeryx =

Canthumeryx Temporal range: Early Miocene

Extinct genus of mammals

Canthumeryx is an extinct genus of primitive giraffid artiodactyls. It is the close ancestor of giraffes.
