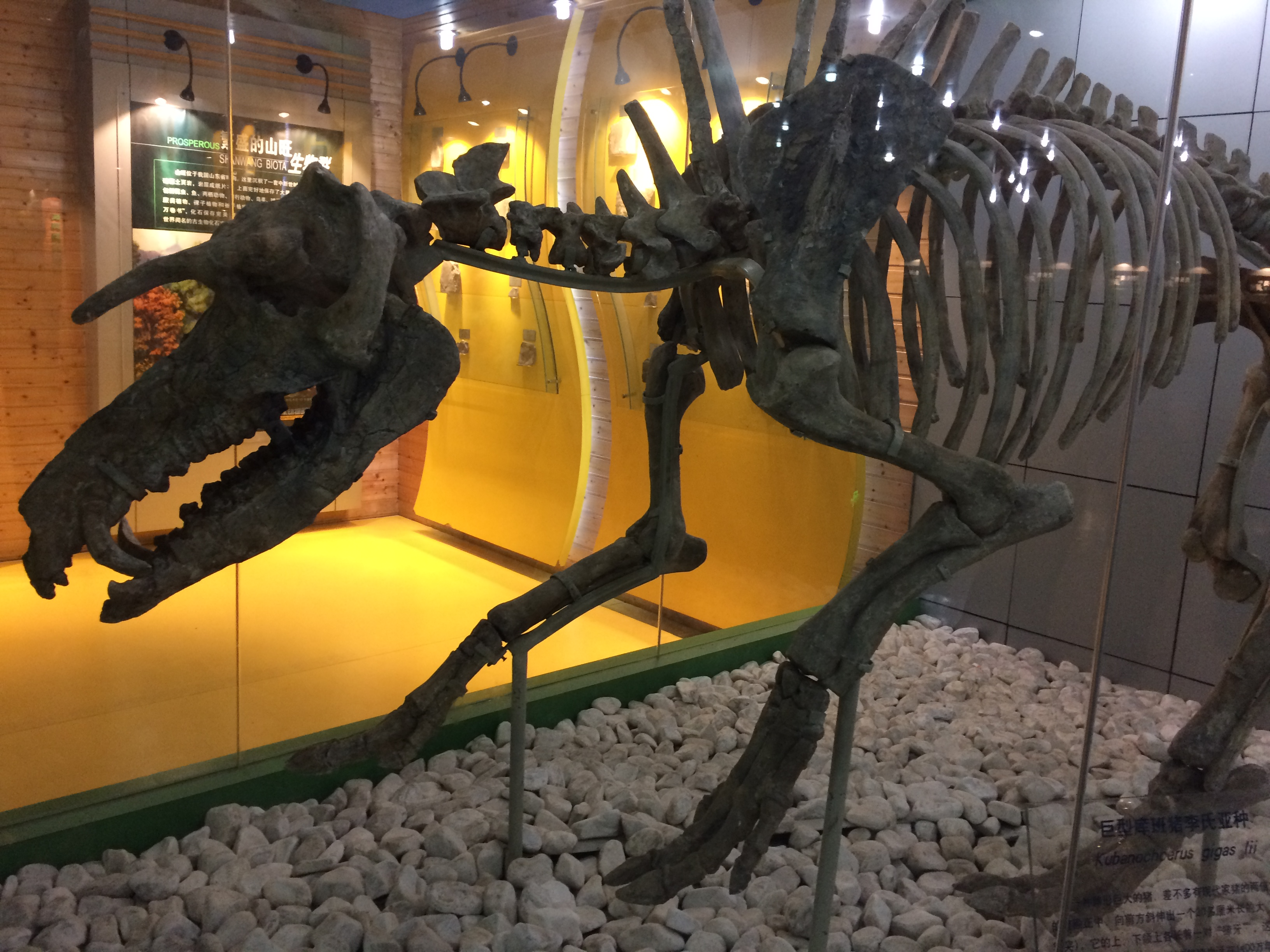
- Mounted skeleton of Kubanochoerus at the Beijing Museum of Natural History

Scientific classification
- Kingdom: Animalia
- Phylum: Chordata
- Class: Mammalia
- Order: Artiodactyla
- Family: Suidae
- Tribe: †Kubanochoerini
- Genus: †Kubanochoerus; Gabunia 1955

Species
- K. gigas (Pearson, 1928); K. lantianensis Qiu, Ye, & Huo 1988; K. mancharensis Van der Made 1996; K. minheensis (Qiu, Li, and Wang, 1981); K. parvus Hou & Deng 2019; K. robustus Gabunia 1955 (type); K. marymuunguae? van der Made, 1996; K. khinzikebirus? Wilkinson, 1976

= Kubanochoerus =

Kubanochoerus Temporal range: Early to Middle Miocene (Burdigalian to Serravallian) 17.2–11.6 Ma

Extinct genus of mammals

Kubanochoerus is an extinct genus of large, long-legged suid artiodactyl mammal from the Miocene of Eurasia and Africa.

== Taxonomy ==
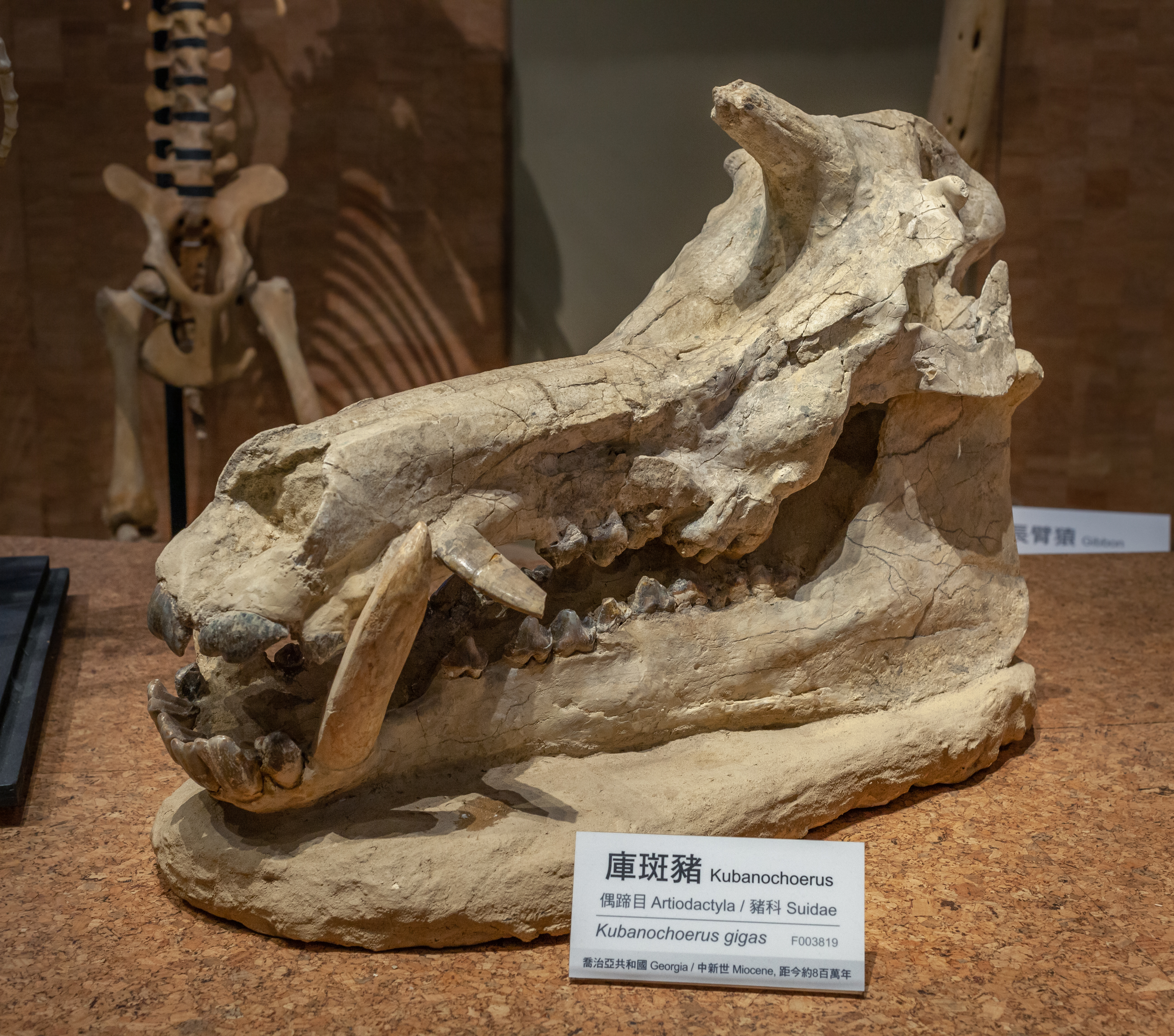
K. gigas skull

The genera Libycochoerus and Megalochoerus were once assigned to Kubanochoerus but are now considered distinct based on dental and minor cranial details.

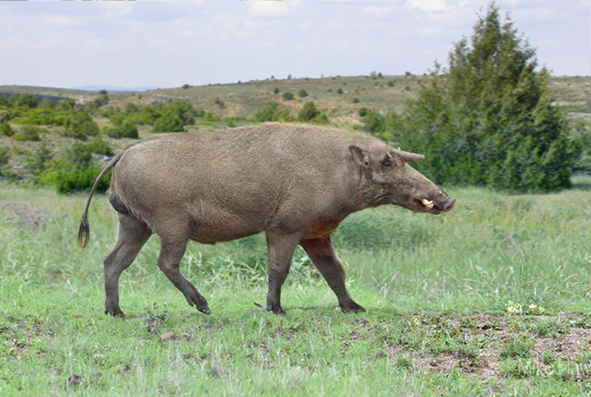
Photo-reconstruction of K. robustus

The putative paraceratheriid genus Caucasotherium, described from the Caucasus on the basis of a bone fragment with four incisors, is actually a synonym of the Middle Miocene Kubanochoerus gigas.

== Description ==
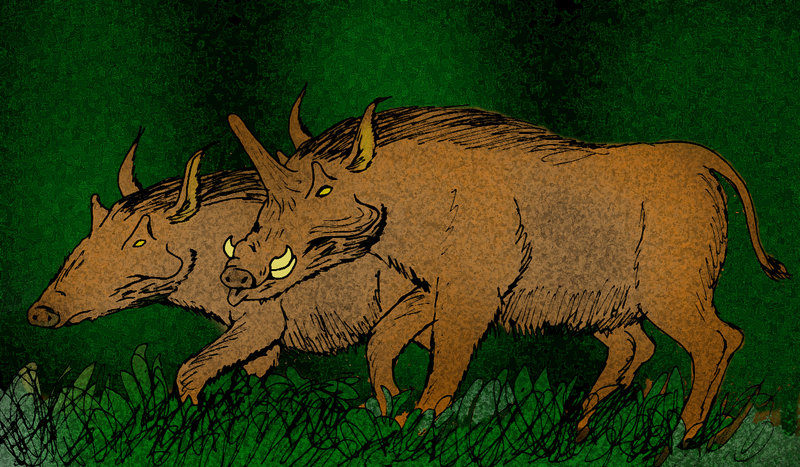
Restoration of K. gigas

The largest species, the aptly named K. gigas, grew to be around 1 metre (3.3 ft) at the shoulder, and probably weighed up to 500 kilograms (1,100 lb) in life. The heads of these pigs were unmistakable, with small eyebrow horns, and a large horn emanating from the forehead of the males. It is speculated that the males used their forehead horns for jousting with each other.

== Bibliography ==
- Hou, Su-Kuan; Deng, Tao (2019), "A new species of Kubanochoerus (Suidae, Artiodactyla) from the Linxia Basin, Gansu Province, China", Vertebrata PalAsiatica, in press
