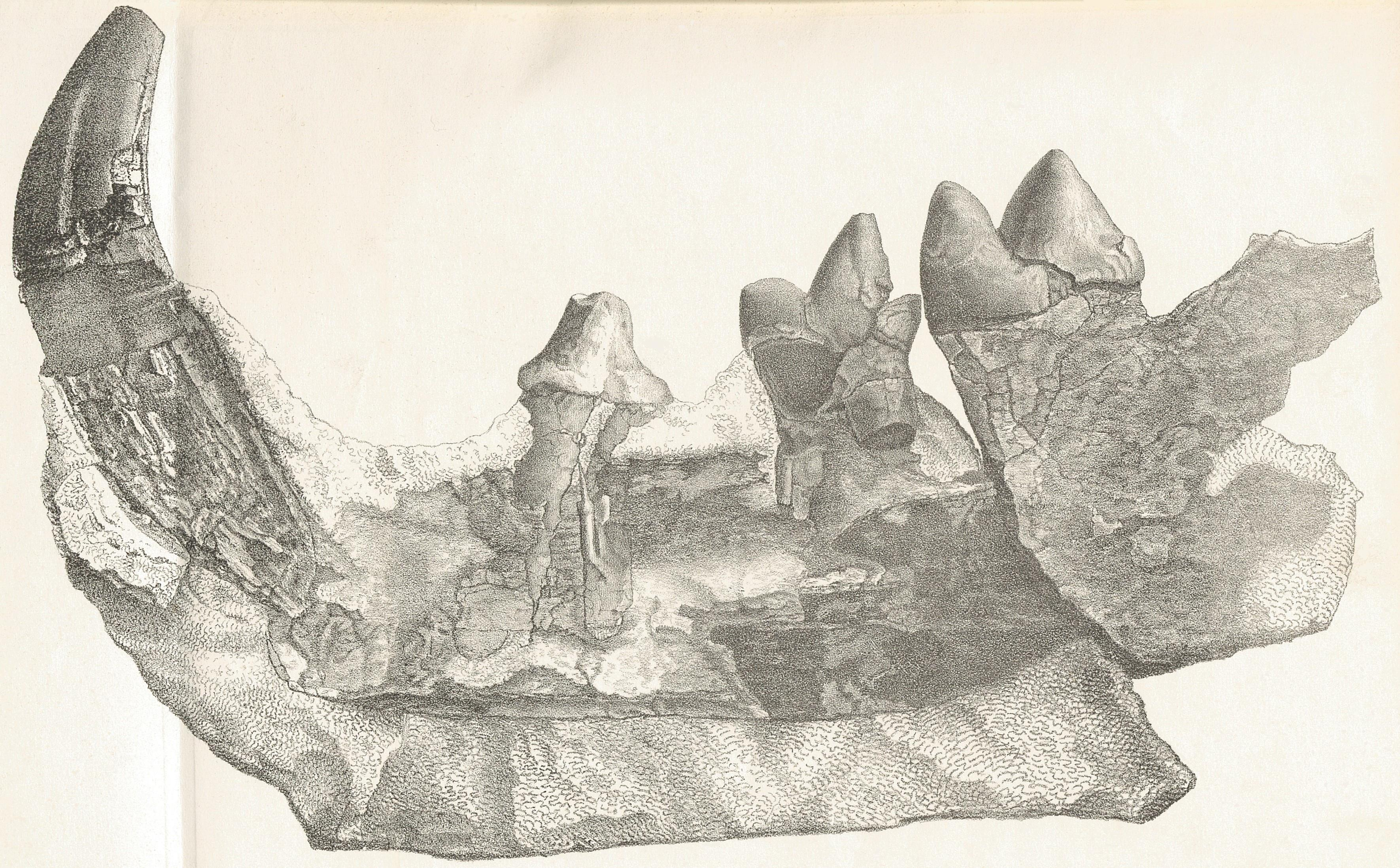
- Lower jaw of Hyainailouros sulzeri

Scientific classification
- Kingdom: Animalia
- Phylum: Chordata
- Class: Mammalia
- Order: †Hyaenodonta
- Superfamily: †Hyainailouroidea
- Family: †Hyainailouridae
- Subfamily: †Hyainailourinae
- Tribe: †Hyainailourini
- Genus: †Hyainailouros; Biedermann, 1863

Type species
- †Hyainailouros sulzeri Biedermann, 1863

Other Species
- †H. bugtiensis (Pilgrim, 1912); †H. napakensis (Ginsburg, 1980); †H. osteothlastes? (Savage, 1973)
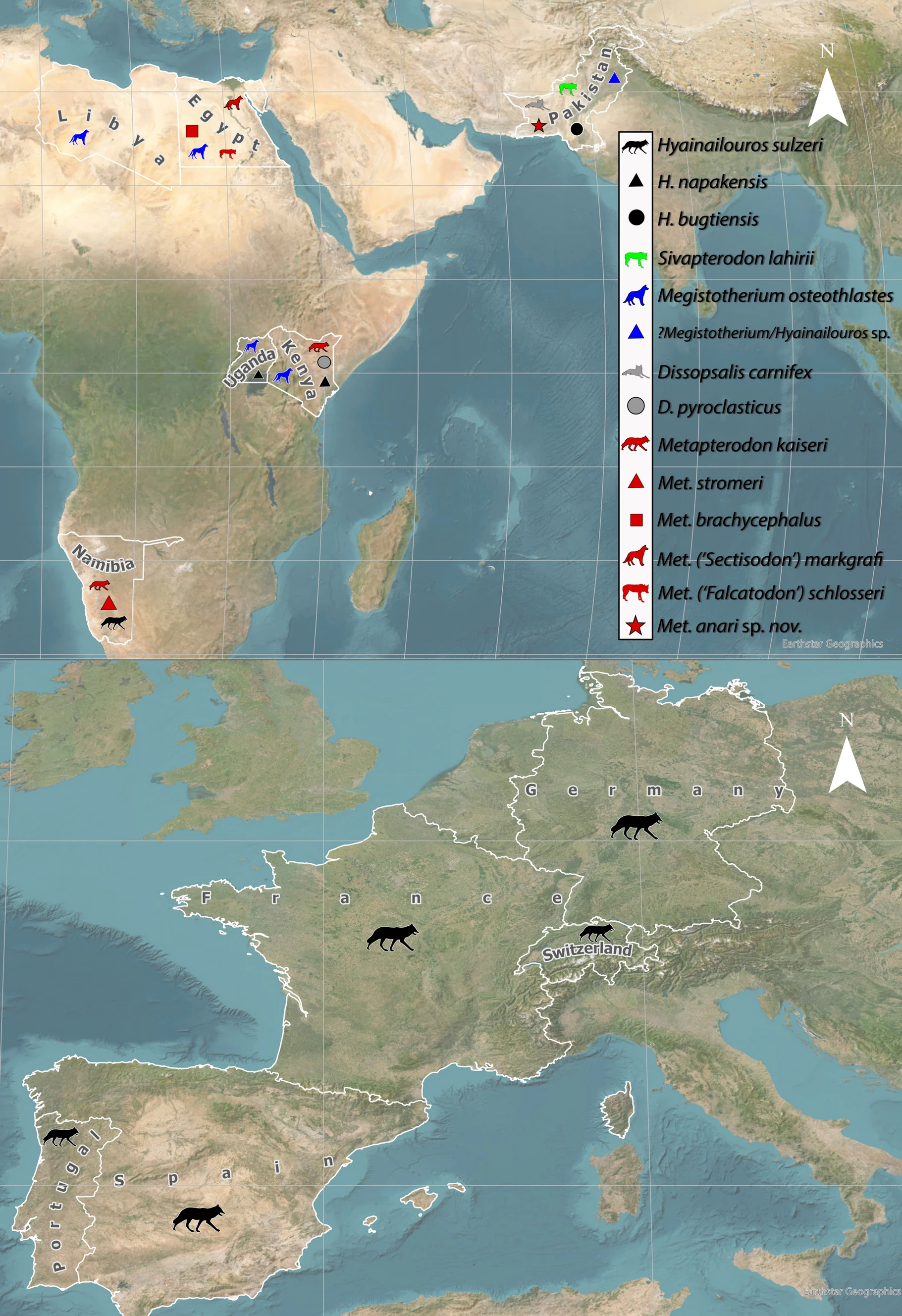
- Distribution of hyainailouroids including Hyainailouros across Afro-Eurasia

Synonyms
- synonyms of genus: Hainailouros (Lavrov, 1999); Hyaenaelurus (Stehlin, 1907); Hyaenailurus (Rütimeyer, 1867); synonyms of species: H. napakensis: Hyainailouros nyanzae (Ginsburg, 1980); Pterodon nyanzae (Savage, 1965); H. sulzeri: Hyainailouros maximus (Meyer, 1837); Hyaenailurus sulzeri (Biedermann, 1863)

= Hyainailouros =

Hyainailouros Temporal range: Early to Late Miocene (Burdigalian to Tortonian) 22–15 Ma Possible earliest Late Miocene records

Genus of mammals (fossil)

Hyainailouros ("hyena-cat") is an extinct paraphyletic genus of hyaenodont belonging to the family Hyainailouridae that lived during the Early to Middle Miocene from 22 to 15 million years ago. This genus comprises at least three species spread across Afro-Eurasia. Currently, there’s a debate whether or not Megistotherium was synonymous to Hyainailouros or a separate genus entirely. The genus currently consists of at least 3 species, H. bugtiensis, H. sulzeri, and H. napakensis. H. sulzeri was the type species of and the largest species within the genus, weighing 500 kg (1,100 lb). On the other hand, H. napakensis was believed to have been the smallest weighing 202–271 kg (445–597 lb), the three species were some of the largest known hyaenodonts.

Hyainailouros and other large hyainailourines were thought to have been large, solitary predators that were specialized on hunting probsocideans and rhinoceroses. The extinction of large hyainailourines such as Hyainailouros, may have been due to the decline of large herbivores and competition with social carnivorans, as their larger, more complex brains, would’ve enabled them to steal kills from the solitary hyainailourines like Hyainailouros. However, studies have found that brain sizes have little to no correlation with sociality among carnivorans, with relative sizes of the anterior brain playing a larger role in the gregariousness among carnivorans, in addition to the habitats being unfavorable to pack hunting in Early Miocene Africa.

== Taxonomy ==
Hyainailouros is the type genus of the superfamily Hyainailouroidae, one of the two known superfamilies of the order Hyaenodonta, with Hyaenodontoidea representing the other superfamily. The genus is part of the subfamily known as Hyainailourinae, within the family Hyainailouridae. This family of hyaenodonts was diverse, while hyainailourines consisted of terrestrial predators, the subfamily Apterodontinae consisted of hyainailourids with otter-like adaptations for a semi-aquatic lifestyle. The classification between Hyainailouros and Megistotherium has been debated by experts. Some experts consider H. bugtiensis to be synonymous with H. sulzeri.

Hyainailourine based on results by recovered by Matthew R. Borths and Nancy J. Stevens (2019):

- Hyainailourinae
  - - Falcatodon schlosseri
    - - Simbakubwa kutokaafrika
      - - - Hyainailouros sulzeri
          - Arrisdrift hyainailourine
        - - Hyainailouros napakensis
          - - Isohyaenodon andrewsi
            - - Sivapterodon
              - Hyainailouros bugtiensis
  - - - Megistotherium osteothlastes
      - Leakitherium hiwegi
    - - - Mlanyama sugu
        - Megapterodon kaiseri
      - - Isohyaenodon zadoki
        - Exiguodon pilgrimi

Hyainailourinae cladogram by Al-Ashqar et al. (2025):

- Hyainailourinae
  - Orienspterodon dahkoensis
  - - - Kerberos langebadreae
      - Pterodon dasyuroides
    - - - Hemipsalodon
        - - Akhnatenavus leptognathus
          - Akhnatenavus nefertiticyon
      - - - Sekhmetops africanus
          - Sekhmetops phiomensis
        - - Paroxyaena sp.
          - - Thereutherium
            - - - Sectisodon markgrafi
                - - - Namasector soriae
                    - Prionogale breviceps
                  - - - Leakitherium hiwegi
                      - Mlanyama sugu
                    - - - Exiguodon pilgrimi
                        - Metapterodon kaiseri
                      - - Ekweeconfractus amorui
                        - Isohyaenodon zadoki
              - - - Bastetodon syrtos
                  - Falcatodon schlosseri
                - - - Hyainailouros sulzeri
                    - Megistotherium
                  - - Simbakubwa
                    - - Hyainailouros napakensis
                      - - Hyainailouros nyanzae
                        - - Isohyaenodon andrewsi
                          - - Hyainailouros bugtiensis
                            - Sivapterodon lahirii

=== Evolution ===
Hyainailouroids were thought to have evolved during the Early Eocene in Africa, although a Middle Paleocene origin was also suspected for the superfamily. Solé et al. (2015) hypothesized that hyainailourines originated in Africa based on the discovery of Parvavorodon and Furodon with the subfamily first appearing in Late Paleocene roughly 57 Ma. In a 2016 paper, Solé and colleagues still recovered an African origin for the subfamily. But they suggested a later origin for the subfamily, with their appearance coinciding with the Early Eocene Climatic Optimum roughly 51 Ma. Borths and Stevens (2017) recovered an Early Eocene temporal origin for the subfamily around 49.66 Ma. However, in contrast to the earlier studies, they suggested an Asian origin for the subfamily. The Miocene lineage of hyainailourines were hypothesized to have during the Early Oligocene around 29.73 Ma in Afro-Arabia. Following studies found stronger evidence for an African origin of the subfamily. They also found that the subfamily arose in Middle Eocene instead of the Early Eocene, roughly 47-46 Ma.

Despite its large size, Hyainailouros may have evolved from small-bodied hyainailourines weighing less than 15 kg (33 lb). Due to the completion of the Gomphothere Land Bridge, Hyainailouros was able to disperse into Asia around 19.6 Ma, and would later disperse into Europe around 16.9 Ma.

== Description ==
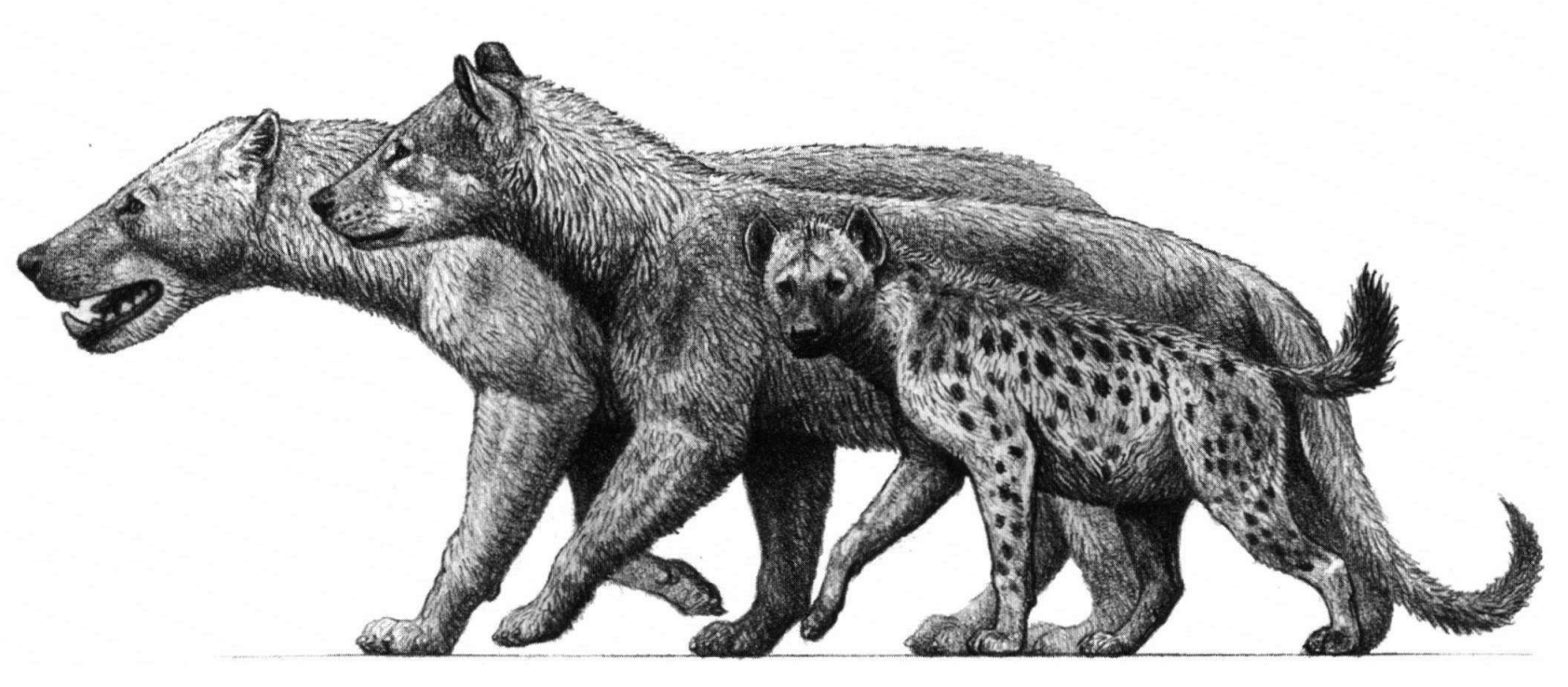
Size comparison of H. sulzeri, Amphicyon giganteus and Crocuta crocuta

Hyainailouros was one of the largest taxa of the order Hyaenodonta. The type species, H. sulzeri, species stood 100 cm (3 ft 3 in) at the shoulders, with a 2019 study estimating this species weighing between 266–1,276 kg (586–2,813 lb). H. bugtiensis was around the same size of H. sulzeri, if not slightly larger, weighing 267–1,744 kg (589–3,845 lb). Both species were similar in size to the closely related Simbakubwa. H. napakensis, on the other hand, was the smallest species of the genus, weighing just around 202–271 kg (445–597 lb). But these regressions are problematic as hyaenodonts possessed very large heads in proportion to their body size. Many experts argue smaller sizes. Based on postcranial remains, some experts argued Hyainailouros was about the size of a tiger, although other experts still suggest higher estimates for H. sulzeri, suggesting it weighed 500 kg (1,100 lb). H. bugtiensis (referred to as H. sulzeri) according to a 2025 study, was estimated to have weighed 430 kg (950 lb).

=== Postcranial remains ===
Several post cranial remains of Hyainailouros have been recovered. The seventh cervical vertebrae of H. sulzeri had a relatively short spine. Compared to Hyaenodon, the spine of Hyainailouros was shorter and less robust, suggesting it bore its head lower. The ulna of H. sulzeri was arched and supported a high, well-developed olecranon, as well as a long, but strong diaphysis to the distal end of ulna. Compared to carnivorans, the fibula of H. sulzeri was thicker in comparison, with the diaphysis being twice as antero-posteriorly elongated in its distal area compared to the proximal area.

It was found that the humerus of Hyainailouros was robust as the humerus of an average felid, but less robust compared to the humerus of Smilodon and American lion. Compared to the humerus of tigers, the deltoid scar was located more distally in Hyainailouros than in tigers.

== Paleobiology ==
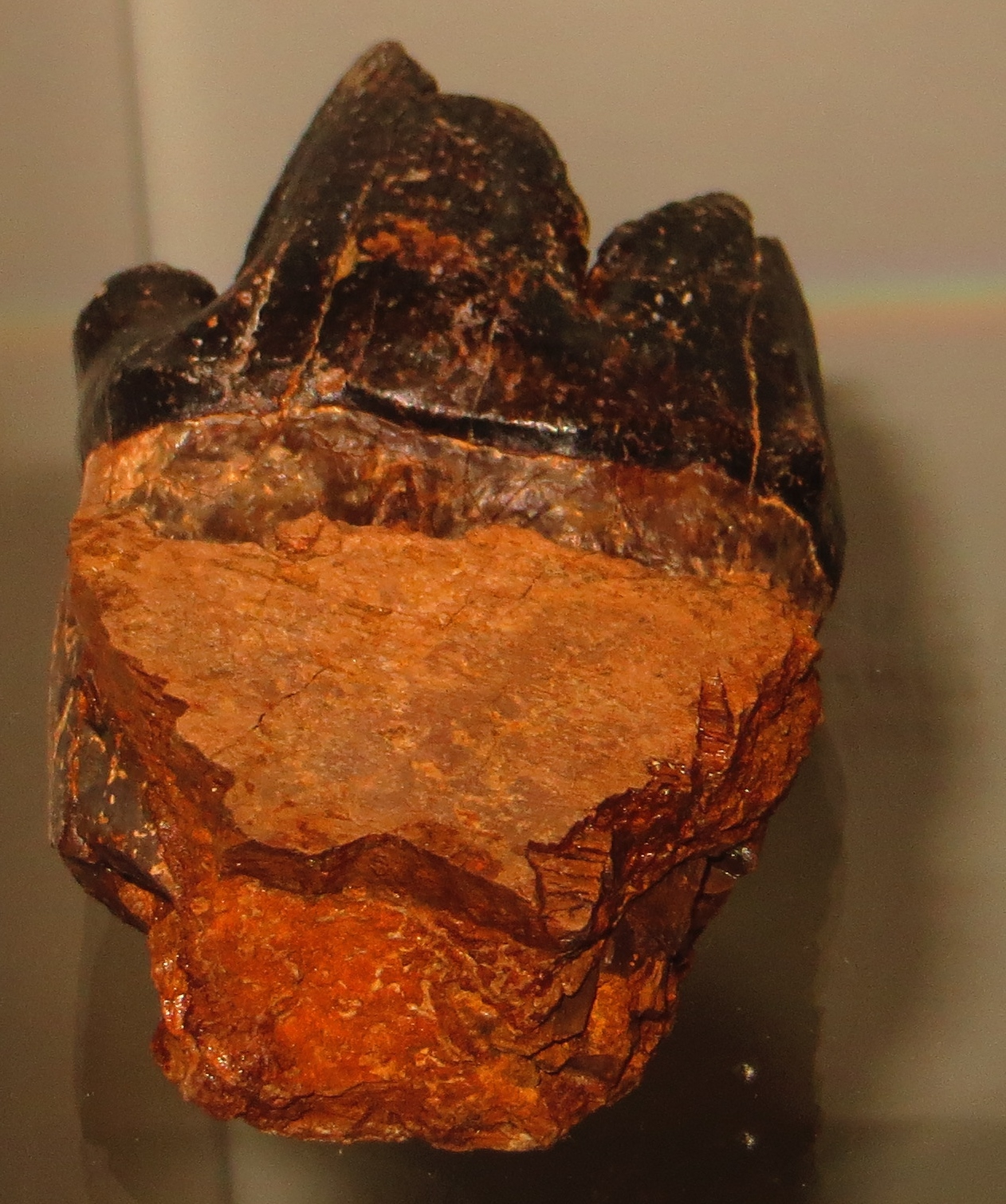
Molar

Much like Simbakubwa, Hyainailouros walked had semidigitigrade locomotion and was probably capable of large, leaping bounds, although it likely wasn’t a fast runner. Early hyainailourines were plantigrade walkers, as seen with Kerberos, however later hyainailourines, such as Hyainailouros and Simbakubwa, shifted to semidigitigrade locomotion as digitigrade conserves more energy and is more efficient in open environments than plantigrade locomotion.

While Hyainailouros showed less adaptation for meat shearing compared to Hyaenodon, it did show more adaptations towards osteophagy, cracking and eating bone. The dental morphology of Hyainailouros suggests that it bone crushing adaptations similar to hyaenids. This is further supported by the zigzag Hunter-Schreger bands being present in the teeth of Hyainailouros, which correlates well with osteophagous dietary habits.

The evolution of large hyainailourines was likely due to the evolution of large herbivores, which resulted in adaptations to hunt and scavenge anthracotheres, proboscideans, and rhinoceroses. It has also been argued that the evolution of large hyainailourines was to avoid competition with carnivorans, however the discovery of Simbakubwa suggests the evolution of large hyainailourines was due to the changes in the herbivore fauna of the Afro-Arabian environment instead of competition with carnivorans.

== Paleoecology ==
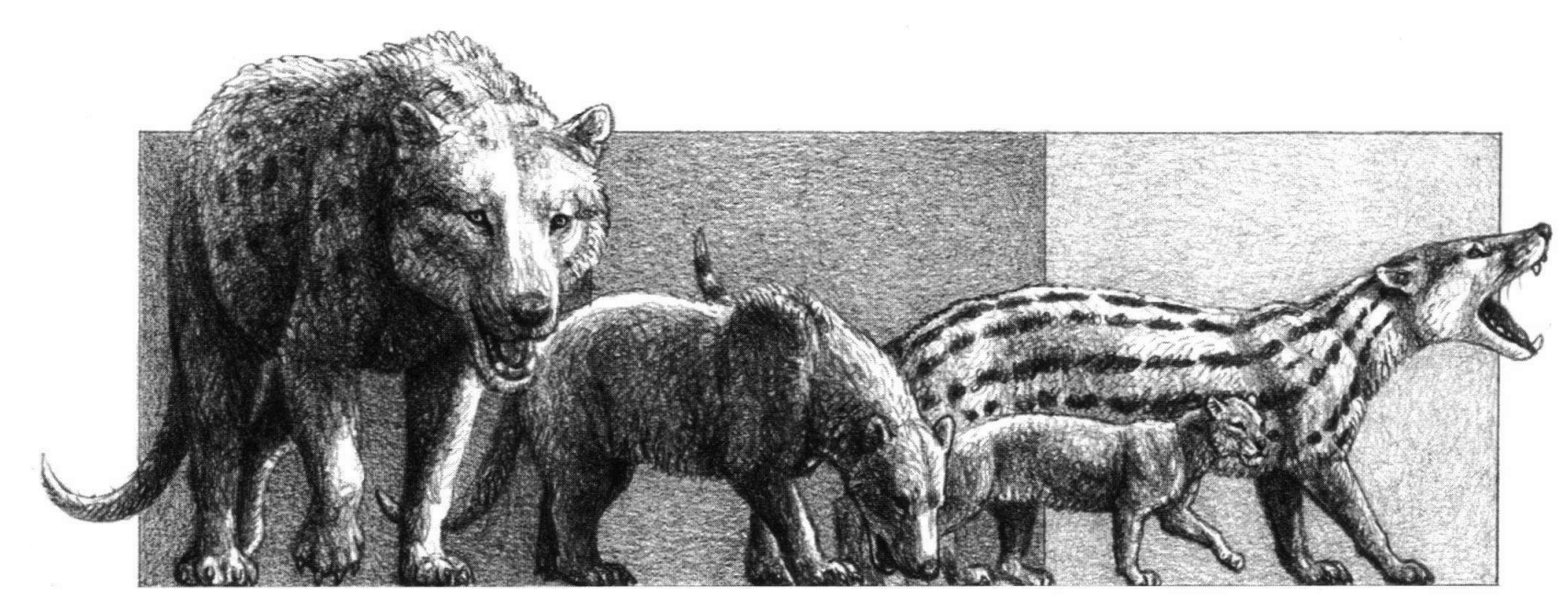
Restoration of H. sulzeri (far left), Cynelos eurydon, Afrosmilus africanus and H. napakensis (far right)

Hyainailouros sulzeri was found in Europe and some parts of Africa, from 18 to 15 Ma. ^{Including supplementary materials} Within Grand Morier of Miocene France, H. sulzeri coexisted with mammalian predators such as the hyena Protictitherium gaillardi, felids such as Miopanthera lorteti and Styriofelis, amphicyonids such as Agnotherium grivense, Amphicyon giganteus, Pseudarctos bavaricus, and Pseudocyon sansaniensis, the mustelid Trocharion albanense, and early ursid Hemicyon sansaniensis. Herbivores present in this locality include proboscideans such as the gomphothere Gomphotherium angustidens, deinothere Prodeinotherium bavaricum, and mammutid Zygolophodon turicensis, an ochotonid, extinct beavers Anchitheriomys and Steneofiber depereti, the early horse Anchitherium aurelianense, the chalicothere Anisodon grande, and rhinoceroses such as Lartetotherium sansaniense, as well aceratheriinaes Brachypotherium brachypus, Plesiaceratherium lumiarense, and Prosantorhinus. Due to its rarity, H. sulzeri probably wasn’t serious competitor towards Amphicyon in Europe.

The locality of Arrisdrift likely represents a side channel of the Proto-Orange River, which was only occasionally filled with flowing water, perhaps when the river overflowed during the rainy season. The rest of the time it was a shallow pool. The presence of 'Crocodylus' gariepensis and giant tortoises indicate a more tropical climate than found in the area today. The habitat was likely a bushy, rather wooded savanna, with a gallery-forest along the river. Within this locality, H. sulzeri coexisted with carnivorans such as the felid Diamantofelis, amphicyonids such as Amphicyon giganteus and Namibiocyon ginsburgi, and viverrids such as Orangictis gariepensis and Africanictis. Contemporary herbivores include proboscideans such as the deinothere Prodeinotherium hobleyi, amebelodont Afromastodon, and the gomphothere Gomphotherium, the hyracoid Prohyrax hendeyi, the bovid Homoiodorcas, the tragulid Dorcatherium pigotti, and the rhino Diceros. Other faunas found within Arrisdrift include reptiles such as the crocodilian Crocodylus gariepensis, tortoises such as Namibchersus namaquensis and Mesochersus orangeus, the boid Central African rock python, and monitor lizards. Birds present in this locality include accipitrids and struthionid. Carbon isotopic analysis found that within the Kiahera Formation, Hyainailouros foraged in forested/wooded environments.

H. bugtiensis was found in the Siwalik Hills, from 22 to 18.5 Ma. Within the Bugti Hills of Pakistan, Hyainailouros coexisted with proboscideans such as the mammutid Zygolophodon metachinjiensis, the deinothere Prodeinotherium pentapotamiae, the choerolophodontid Choerolophodon corrugatus, and gomphotheres such as Gomphotherium and Protanancus chinjiensis, the giraffid Progiraffa, and rhinoceroses such as Brachypotherium, Hoploaceratherium, Dicerorhinus, and Aprotodon fatehjangense. Contemporary predators included the amphicyonid Amphicyon and Crocodylus.

== Extinction ==
H. sulzeri would go extinct 15 Ma, during the Middle Miocene. ^{Including supplementary materials} Barry (2025) suggested H. bugtiensis (referred as H. sulzeri) went extinct roughly 11.4 Ma. However, Mahmood et al. (2026) reclassified youngest remains of the hyainailourine as either a Hyainailouros species or Megistotherium. The extinction of large hyainailourines (and African hyaenodonts) has been hypothesized to have been the result of changing ecosystems and competition with carnivorans, though the latter is poorly supported. While hyaenodonts in Namibia declined due to the inability to adapt to environments such as steppes, savannas, and deserts, a few lineages continued to persist. The semidigitigrade foot posture of Hyainailouros may have allowed to have been better adapted for open environments.

Initially, many experts have argued that the presence of carnivorans may have resulted in some hyaenodonts to become larger and more hypercarnivorous due to displacement, but the discovery of Simbakubwa suggests evolution large sizes of hyainailourines was due changes in the herbivore fauna as a result of changes in the Afro-Arabia landscape instead of competition with carnivorans, which diversified later on in the Miocene; it is instead believed that large hyainailourines may have declined due to the decline of large herbivores, which tend to have slow generation times and may be particularly sensitive to environmental changes.

Since they were specialized on these herbivores, even if their population declined briefly, the large hyainailourines would’ve been affected by the changing resources, more so than the smaller carnivorans. This is seen in modern ecosystems where large hypercarnivores are affected more dramatically with environmental shifts than smaller mesocarnivores.

Borths and Stevens (2019) hypothesized that social carnivorans may have been adept at stealing large carcasses from large, solitary hyainailourines and outcompeted them. However, studies have shown that larger brains have little to no roles in sociality among carnivorans, instead within carnivoran families, gregariousness tends to be correlate to the relative anterior brain volume. Due to the absence of canids (who dispersed into Africa by the latest Miocene), pack hunting is difficult to assess among carnivorans in Early Miocene Africa. Furthermore, vegetation in the Early Miocene were generally more closed, preventing pack hunting and shorter, high-speed chases from being effective.
