= Libycochoerus =

Libycochoerus Temporal range: Miocene

Scientific classification
- Domain: Eukaryota
- Kingdom: Animalia
- Phylum: Chordata
- Class: Mammalia
- Order: Artiodactyla
- Family: Suidae
- Tribe: †Kubanochoerini
- Genus: †Libycochoerus; Arambourg, 1961

Species
- L. massai Arambourg, 1961 (type); L. jeanneli (Arambourg, 1943); L. anchidens (Made, 1996)

Extinct genus of pig-like animals

Libycochoerus is an extinct genus of large and long-legged animals in the pig family from the Miocene of Africa.

== Taxonomy ==
Libycochoerus was at one point sunk as a junior synonym of Kubanochoerus but is now considered a distinct genus. All species of this species have very robust teeth that are mesiodistally long, but also stout canines and simple molars.
