= Lopholistriodon =

Lopholistriodon Temporal range: 15.97–11.608 Ma

Scientific classification
- Kingdom: Animalia
- Phylum: Chordata
- Class: Mammalia
- Order: Artiodactyla
- Family: Suidae
- Subfamily: †Listriodontinae
- Tribe: †Namachoerini
- Genus: †Lopholistriodon; Pickford & Wilkinson 1975

Type species
- †Lopholistriodon kidogosana Pickford & Wilkinson 1975

Species
- L. juba?; L. kidogosana; L. pickfordi

Extinct genus of mammals

Lopholistriodon was an extinct genus of even-toed ungulates that existed during the Miocene in Africa.

It was among the earliest and smallest member of the Listriodontinae. One species, Lopholistriodon moruoroti, has been reassigned to the related Namachoerus.
