= Nguruwe =

Nguruwe Temporal range: 20.43–15.97 Ma

Scientific classification
- Kingdom: Animalia
- Phylum: Chordata
- Class: Mammalia
- Order: Artiodactyla
- Family: Suidae
- Subfamily: †Hyotheriinae
- Genus: †Nguruwe; Pickford, 1986

Type species
- †Nguruwe kijivium Pickford, 1986

Species
- N kijivium; N namibensis

Extinct genus of even-toed ungulates

Nguruwe was an extinct genus of even-toed ungulates that existed during the Miocene in Africa.

== Etymology ==
The word "Nguruwe" is the Swahili word for pig.

== Taxonomy ==
It was formerly considered a member of the subfamily Listriodontinae, but has since been placed in Hyotheriinae.

== Palaeoecology ==
δ^{18}O analysis indicates that N. kijivium consumed underground roots and environmental water, contrasting with hypotheses that it was folivorous based on its tooth morphology.
