= Megapedetes =

Megapedetes Temporal range: Miocene to Pliocene

Scientific classification
- Domain: Eukaryota
- Kingdom: Animalia
- Phylum: Chordata
- Class: Mammalia
- Order: Rodentia
- Family: Pedetidae
- Genus: †Megapedetes; MacInnes, 1957

Type species
- †Megapedetes pentadactylus MacInnes, 1957

Species
- Megapedetes aegaeus Sen, 1974; Megapedetes gariepensis Mein and Senut, 2003; Megapedetes pentadactylus MacInnes, 1957; Megapedetes pickfordi Mein and Senut, 2003

Extinct genus of rodents

Megapedetes is a genus of fossil rodents related to the springhare and other species of the genus Pedetes, with which it forms the family Pedetidae. At least four species are known, which ranged through Africa, southwestern Asia, and southeastern Europe from the Miocene to the Pliocene. The genus was larger than Pedetes.

Species of Megapedetes were larger, relatively low-crowned (brachydont) pedetids with short, mostly fused roots under their teeth. There was no gutter surrounding the incisive foramina (openings in the front part of the palate). The bones are more robustly built than in Pedetes and in another fossil relative of the springhares, Parapedetes. Unlike in Pedetes, the first metatarsal (a foot bone) is present. It may have fed on less rough vegetation than Pedetes does.

In Namibia, two species are known from the early middle Miocene of Arrisdrift—M. gariepensis and M. pickfordi. An isolated phalanx from a slightly older site, Auchas Mine, cannot be reliably identified to species level, but may be M. gariepensis. Megapedetes and other pedetids are reasonably common in the Miocene of East Africa. M. pentadactylus, the type species of the genus, occurs at Songhor, Rusinga, and Bukwa; a species that may be close to M. gariepensis is known from Kirimun, Fort Ternan, and Maboko; a pedetid from Kipsaraman resembles M. pickfordi, but is more low-crowned; and other pedetids may occur in other East African sites. A species of Megapedetes, perhaps M. pentadactylus, is known from Saudi Arabia in sediments about 16 million years old. In the early Miocene of Israel, a yet undescribed pedetid close to Megapedetes is found. Species of Megapedetes are also known from the Miocene and Pliocene of North Africa. Another species, Megapedetes aegaeus, occurs at Bayraktepe in Turkey and the genus has also been found on the Greek island of Chios.

Among the two Arrisdrift species, M. gariepensis is about 15% smaller than the East African M. pentadactylus and more adapted to jumping and has less robust incisors, more high-crowned (hypsodont) cheekteeth. The second species, M. pickfordi, is even smaller and more hypsodont. M. aegaeus and M. pentadactylus differ in details of the crowns of the cheekteeth.

== Literature cited ==
- Mein, P. and Senut, B. 2003. The Pedetidae from the Miocene site of Arrisdrift (Namibia). Geological Survey of Namibia Memoir 19:161–170.
- Sen, S. 1977. Megapedetes aegaeus, n. sp. (Pedetidae) et a propos d'autres "rongeurs Africains" dans le Miocène d'Anatolie. Geobios 10:983–986.
- Walker, A. 1969. Lower Miocene fossils from Mount Elgon, Uganda (subscription required). Nature 223:591–593.
- Winkler, A.J. 1992. Systematics and biogeography of Middle Miocene rodents from the Muruyur Beds, Baringo District, Kenya (subscription required). Journal of Vertebrate Paleontology 12(2):236–249.
- Wood, A.E. and Goldsmith, N.F. 1992. Early Miocene rodents and lagomorphs from Israel (subscription required). Journal of Vertebrate Paleontology 18(Suppl. 3):87A–88A.
