= Africanictis =

Africanictis Temporal range: Miocene, 23–11.6 Ma

Scientific classification
- Domain: Eukaryota
- Kingdom: Animalia
- Phylum: Chordata
- Class: Mammalia
- Order: Carnivora
- Suborder: Feliformia
- Infraorder: Aeluroidea
- Genus: †Africanictis; Morales et al., 1998

Species
- †Africanictis hyaenoides; †Africanictis meini; †Africanictis schmidtkittleri

Extinct genus of carnivores

Africanictis is an extinct genus of carnivorous cat-like mammal belonging to the infraorder Aeluroidea, endemic to Africa for approximately 11.42 million years, from 23.03 to 11.610 Ma, during the Miocene epoch.

Africanictis is thought to have had an omnivorous—or more precisely hypercarnivorous to mesocarnivorous—diet.

== Taxonomy ==
Africanictis was named by Morales et al. (1998). It was assigned to Stenoplesictidae by Morlo et al. (2007).
