= Orangictis =

Orangictis Temporal range: Langhian

Scientific classification
- Missing taxonomy template (fix): Orangictis
- Species: Template:Taxonomy/OrangictisO. gariepensis

Binomial name
- Template:Taxonomy/OrangictisOrangictis gariepensis Morales et al., 2001

Extinct genus of viverrid carnivoran

Orangictis is an extinct monotypic genus of viverrid carnivoran that lived in what is now Namibia during the Langhian stage of the Miocene epoch.

== Etymology ==
The generic name Orangictis derives from the Orange River and the common suffix -ictis used to name small carnivorans. The specific epithet of the type species, Orangictis gariepensis, is derived from the Khoekhoe name for the Orange River, Gariep.
