= Namachoerus =

Scientific classification
- Kingdom: Animalia
- Phylum: Chordata
- Class: Mammalia
- Order: Artiodactyla
- Family: Suidae
- Subfamily: †Listriodontinae
- Tribe: †Namachoerini
- Genus: †Namachoerus; Pickford, 1995
- Species: †N. moruoroti

Binomial name
- †Namachoerus moruoroti Wilkinson, 1976

Synonyms
- Lopholistriodon moruoroti

Extinct genus of mammals

Namachoerus was an extinct genus of even-toed ungulates that existed during the Miocene of Africa.

One species, Namachoerus moruoroti was formerly placed in the genus Lopholistriodon.
