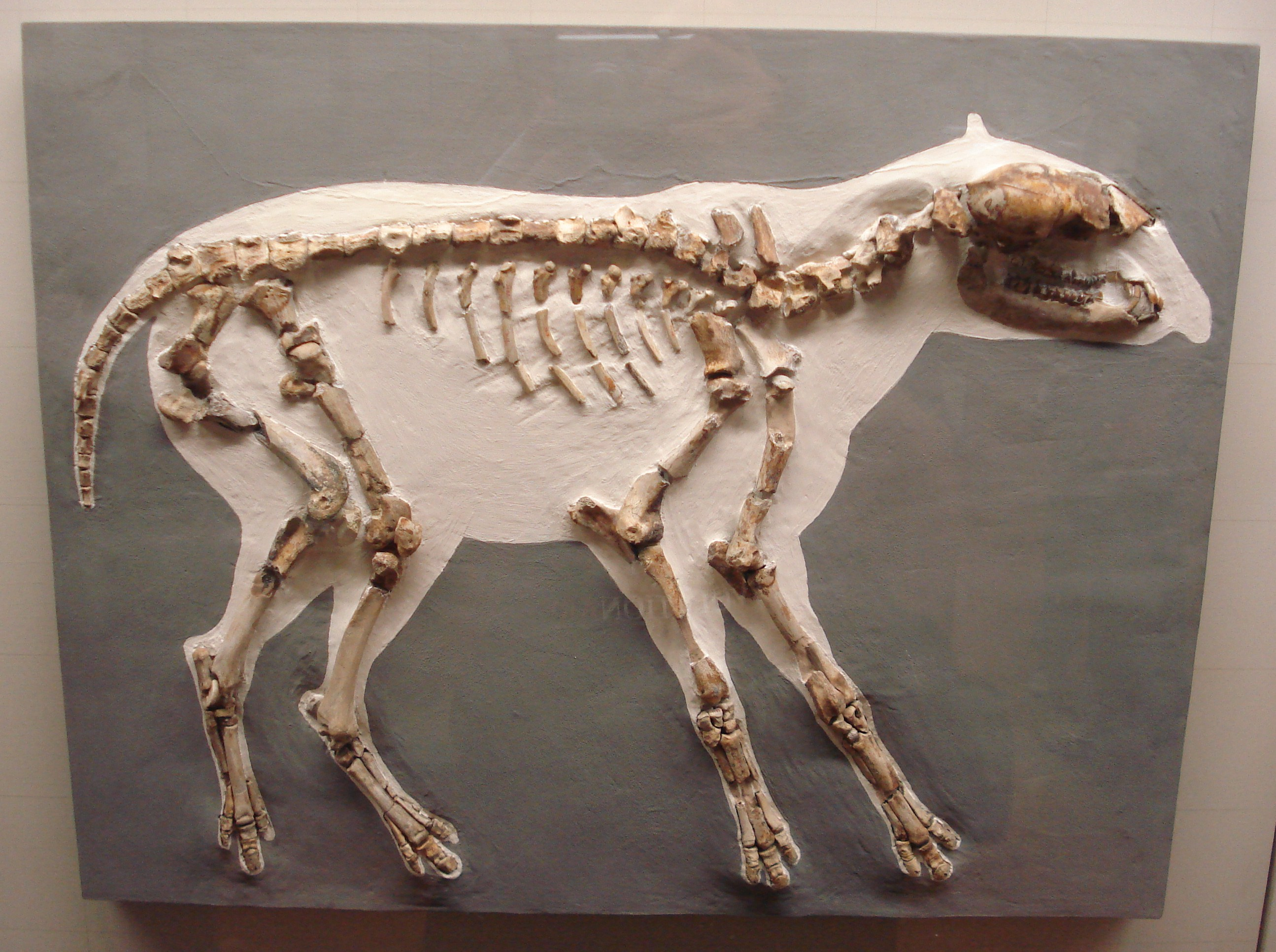
- Plagiolophus minor skeleton from Baden-Württemberg, State Museum of Natural History Stuttgart

Scientific classification
- Kingdom: Animalia
- Phylum: Chordata
- Class: Mammalia
- Order: Perissodactyla
- Family: †Palaeotheriidae
- Subfamily: †Palaeotheriinae
- Genus: †Plagiolophus; Pomel, 1847

Type species
- †Palaeotherium minus (= †Plagiolophus minor) Cuvier, 1804

Other species
- †P. ovinus Aymard, 1846; †P. annectens Owen, 1848; †P. fraasi von Meyer, 1852; †P. javali Filhol, 1877; †P. lugdunensis Depéret & Carrière, 1901; †P. cartailhaci Stehlin, 1904; †P. cartieri Stehlin, 1904; †P. oweni Depéret, 1917; †P. curtisi Hooker, 1986; †P. major Brunet & Jehenne, 1989; †P. ministri Brunet & Jehenne, 1989; †P. casasecaensis Cuesta, 1994; †P. mazateronensis Cuesta, 1994; †P. huerzeleri Remy, 2000; †P. ringeadei Remy, 2004; †P. mamertensis Remy, 2004; For subspecies suggested, see below.

Synonyms
- Genus synonymy: Paloplotherium Owen, 1848; Synonyms of P. minor: Plagiolophus tenuirostris Pomel, 1853; Synonyms of P. ovinus: Palaeotherium ovinum Aymard, 1846; Synonyms of P. annectens: Paloplotherium annectens Owen, 1848; Synonyms of P. javali: Paloplotherium javalii Filhol, 1877; Synonyms of P. lugdunensis: Paloplotherium lugdunense Depéret & Carrière, 1901; Synonyms of P. major: Paloplotherium majus Brunet & Jehenne, 1989; Dubious species: Plagiolophus minutus Ruetimeyer, 1862; Plagiolophus plesiomorphicus Soler, 1997

= Plagiolophus (mammal) =

Plagiolophus Temporal range: Middle Eocene – Early Oligocene 44.9–27.3 Ma (Possible earliest record of up to 46.3 Ma)

Extinct genus of mammals

Plagiolophus (Ancient Greek: πλάγιος (oblique) + λόφος (crest) meaning 'oblique crest') is an extinct genus of equoids belonging to the family Palaeotheriidae. It lived in Europe from the middle Eocene to the early Oligocene. The type species, P. minor, was described in 1804 by the French naturalist Georges Cuvier based on fossils from the Paris Basin, France, including a now-lost skeleton. Cuvier assigned the species to the genus Palaeotherium, and in 1847, Auguste Pomel assigned it to the new subgenus Plagiolophus. Plagiolophus was promoted to genus rank by subsequent palaeontologists and today includes as many as seventeen species. As proposed by the French palaeontologist Jean A. Remy in 2004, it contains three subgenera: Plagiolophus, Paloplotherium, and Fraasiolophus.

Plagiolophus is a derived (evolutionary advanced) member of its family with tridactyl (three-toed) forelimbs and hindlimbs. It has longer postcanine diastemata (gaps between teeth) compared to Palaeotherium and brachyodont (low-crowned) dentition that over time became more hypsodont (high-crowned) in response to climatic trends. It is also defined by an elongated facial region, a deep nasal notch, and orbits (eye sockets) that are more positioned backwards compared to those of Palaeotherium. Plagiolophus, as a species-rich genus, had a wide body mass range from less than 10 kg (22 lb) in the smallest species P. minor to over 150 kg (330 lb) in the largest species P. javali. Some species were stockier (P. annectens, P. fraasi, P. javali) while others were lightly built and had cursorial (running) adaptations (P. minor, P. ministri, P. huerzeleri).

Plagiolophus and other members of the Palaeotheriinae likely descended from the earlier subfamily Pachynolophinae during the middle Eocene. Western Europe, where Plagiolophus was mainly distributed, was an archipelago that was isolated from the rest of Eurasia and therefore showed high levels of endemism. While many species had short temporal ranges, P. minor was long-lasting to the extent that researchers observed changes in its dietary habits over time. P. minor is thought to have consumed less hard foods (fruits, seeds) and to have become more specialized but less selective towards tough, abrasive, and older leaves in response to environmental trends in the late Eocene to early Oligocene. Its dietary habits would have allowed it to occupy a different ecological niche from other palaeotheres like Palaeotherium and Leptolophus. Plagiolophus was diverse for much of its evolutionary history and survived far past the Grande Coupure extinction event, likely because some of its species were well adapted towards major environmental trends as a result of their dietary changes and cursorial nature. It was able to adapt to more seasonal climates after the Grande Coupure and coexisted with immigrant faunas from the faunal turnover event. Its eventual extinction during the later early Oligocene marked the complete extinction of the Palaeotheriidae.

== Taxonomy ==
=== Research history ===
==== Early history ====
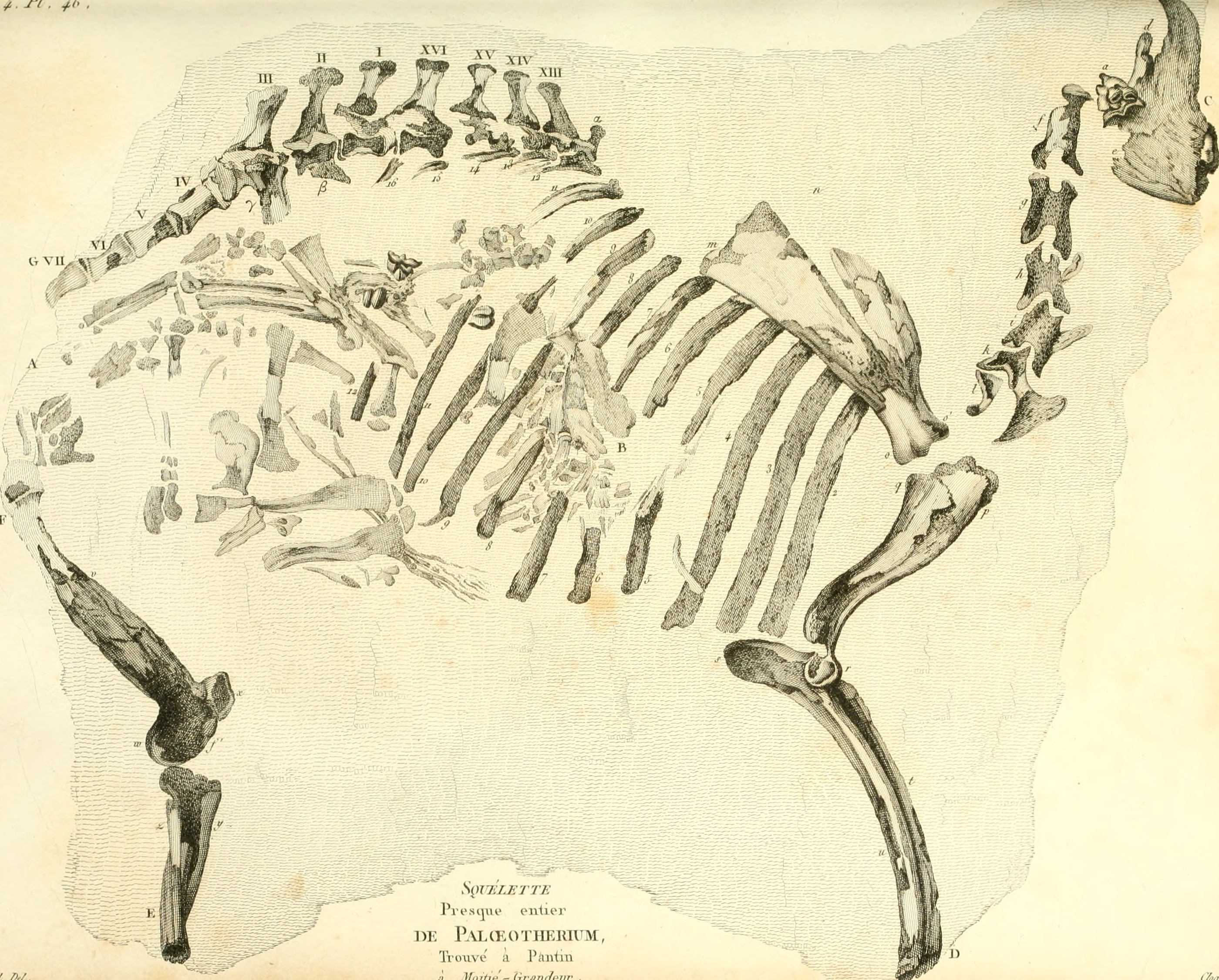
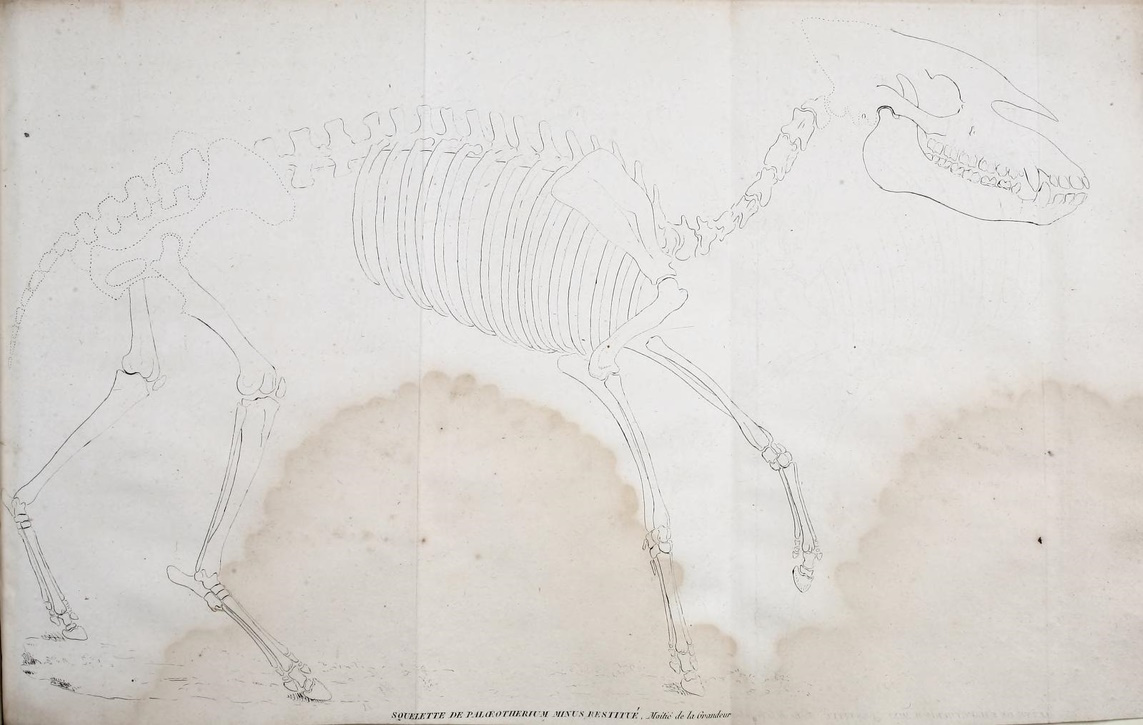
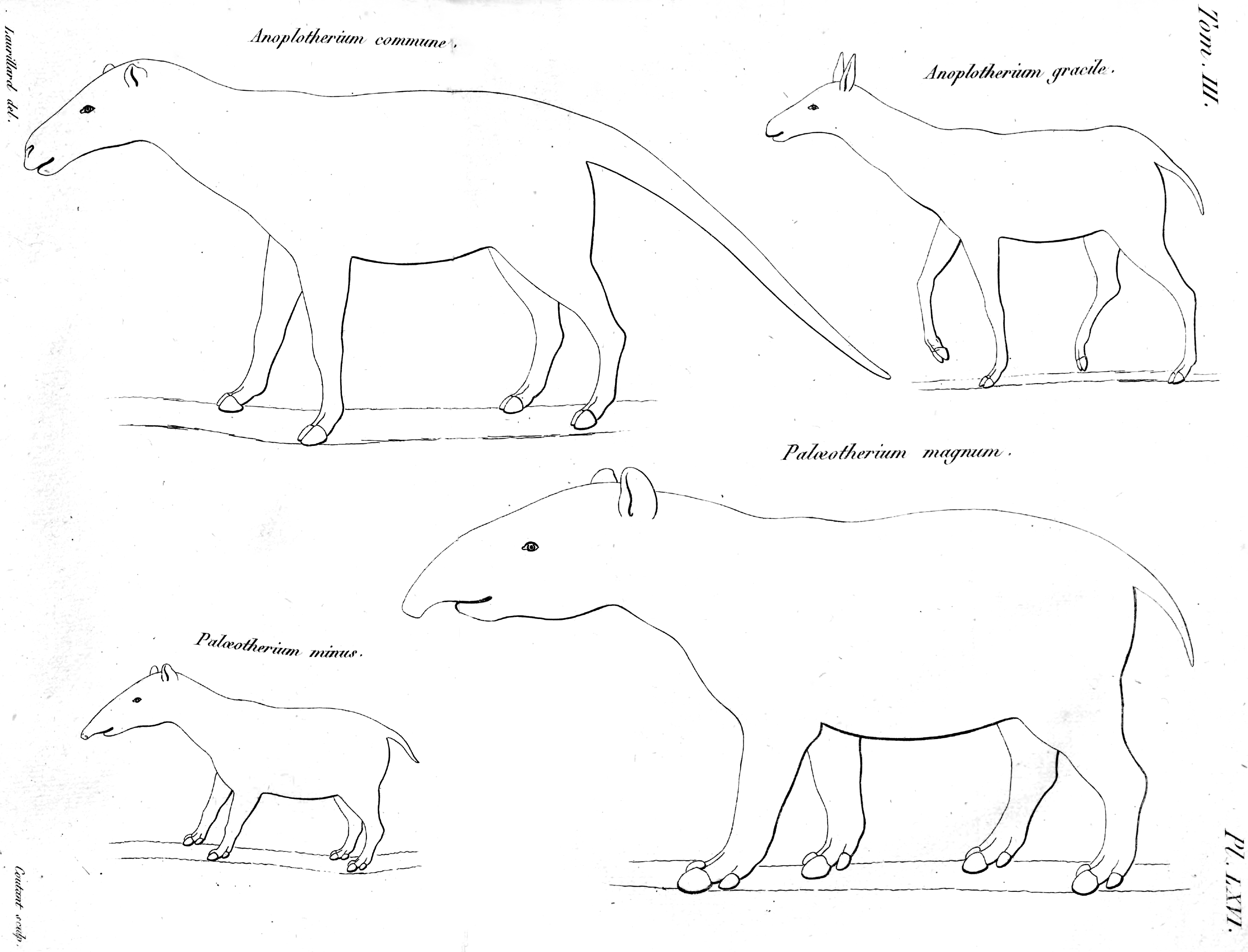
1804 sketch of a now-lost skeleton of Plagiolophus minor from the commune of Pantin (left), an 1812 drawn skeletal reconstruction based on the Pantin skeleton and additional fossil material by Georges Cuvier (center), and restorations of Montmartre fossil mammals including P. minor (right)

In 1804, the French naturalist Georges Cuvier, having established the genus Palaeotherium and some of its species (P. medium and P. magnum), recognized a third species, Palaeotherium minus, based on some postcranial fossils from the gypsum quarries of the outskirts of Paris (known as the Paris Basin), although he did not elaborate further on them. In a later journal of the same year, he described a nearly completely skeleton from the quarries of the French commune of Pantin, originally found by the French naturalist Auguste Nicholas de Saint-Genis. According to Cuvier, the quarry workers previously thought the skeleton to be of a ram, and it was presented as such in public newspapers. The French prefect Nicolas Frochot later acquired it and brought it to the National Museum of Natural History, France, where Cuvier was then able to observe that it must have been a skeleton of a Palaeotherium species. He noted that the majority of the fossil bones were detached from others and/or damaged but that postcranial elements such as scapulae, humeri, femora, vertebrae, and ribs were found. The naturalist also provided a figure of the skeleton within the journal. Of note is that the skeleton, confirmed to be of a pregnant female, has since been lost.^{165}

In 1812, Cuvier published his drawing of a skeletal reconstruction of P. minus based on known fossil remains of the species including the mostly complete skeleton. He also suggested theoretical lifestyles of several Palaeotherium species. In particular, he suggested that P. minus resembled a tapir, was smaller than a sheep, and was cursorial (adapted for running) based on the slender morphologies of its leg bones. Such a behaviour and small size would have differed from other species of Palaeotherium, several of which according to Cuvier had stockier limbed bone builds. He also identified that P. medium, P. magnum, P. minus, P. crassum, and P. curtum were all tridactyl, or three-toed.

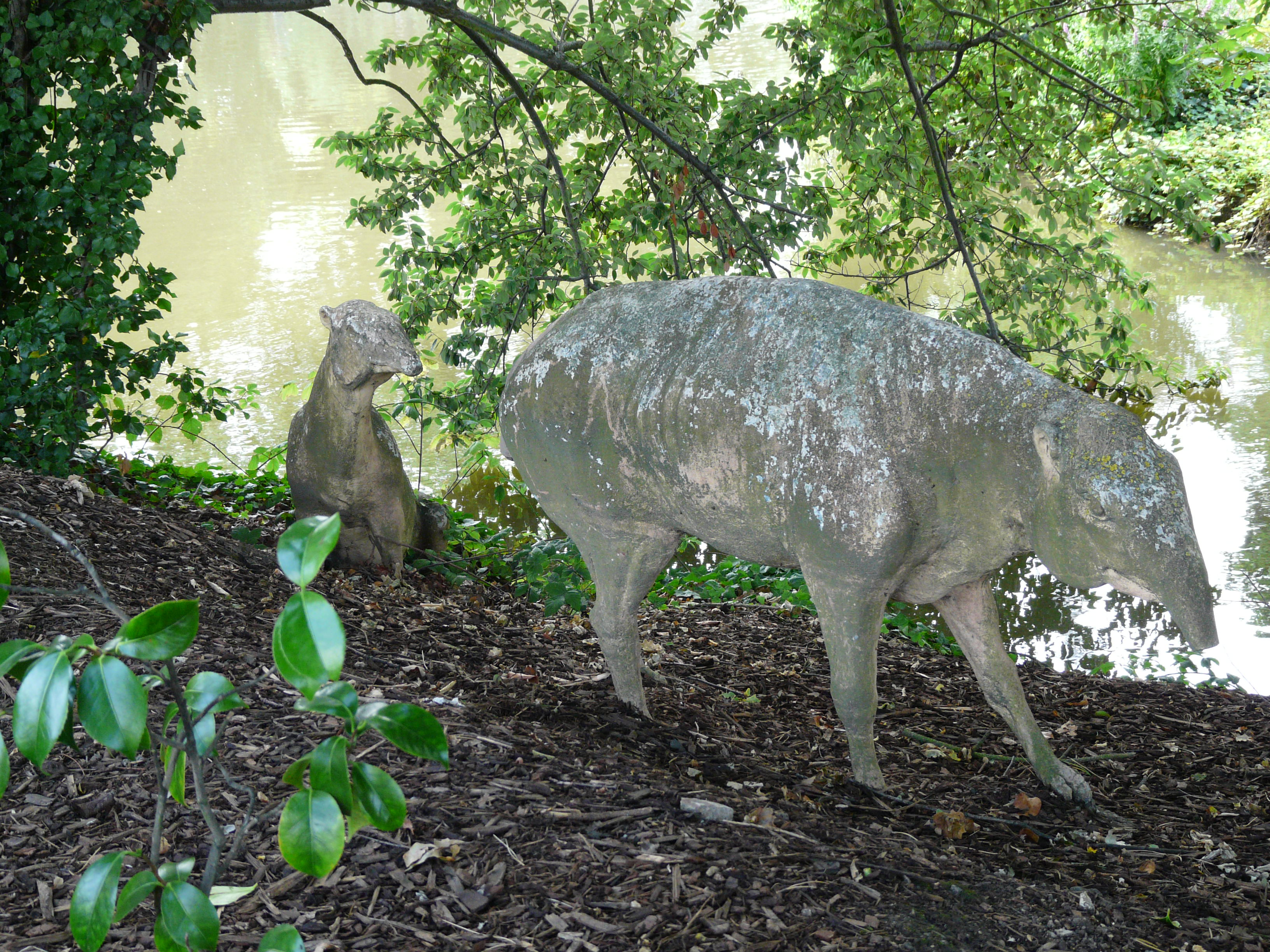
Sculptures of Plagiolophus minor (left) and Palaeotherium medium (right) as they appeared as part of the Crystal Palace Dinosaurs sculptures of the Crystal Palace Park

"P. minus" (= Plagiolophus minor) was amongst the fossil mammal species represented as sculptures in the Crystal Palace Dinosaurs attraction in the Crystal Palace Park in the United Kingdom, open to the public since 1854 and constructed by English sculptor Benjamin Waterhouse Hawkins. The Plagiolophus sculpture is smaller than the P. magnum and P. medium sculptures and is in a sitting position unlike the other two. The models' resemblances to tapirs reflected early perceptions that the palaeothere species resembled them in body plan appearances. Despite this, the sculptures differ from living tapirs in several ways, such as shorter plus taller faces, higher eye positions, slender legs, longer tails, and the presence of three toes on the forelimbs unlike the four toes of the forelimbs of tapirs.

Hawkins and other workers seemingly used Cuvier's research for reference to the anatomy of P. minor and reproduced its size and proportions accordingly. The P. minor sculpture, sheep-sized, originally had a short head that probably measured about 1.3 m (4 ft 3 in) in length and had pointed ears, large eyes, long lips, a stocky proboscis, a muscular neck, and a short plus slender tail. It looks similar to the P. medium sculpture overall but lacks skin details. Although the original head's form is poorly known, it appeared to have been longer and more robust than that of P. medium. Within the later half of the 20th century, the original head was lost and replaced with a head cast of P. medium. Because the size and form of the head made it difficult to attach to the P. minor body normally, the back portion of the cranium was removed and the neck lengthened. This resulted in the sculpture appearing to look forward instead of upwards like before. The P. minor sculpture lost its head twice more, once recently in 2014 when its head was tossed into a lake of the Crystal Palace by an unknown criminal and had to be recovered.

==== Naming and later 19th century research history ====
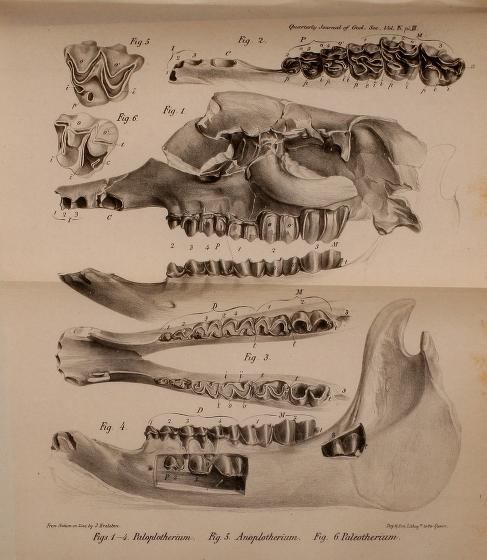
Cranial fossils of Plagiolophus annectens (fig. 1-4), Anoplotherium (fig. 5), and Palaeotherium (fig. 6), 1848

In 1846, French palaeontologist Auguste Aymard recorded a mandible with teeth from the French department of Haute-Loire, noting that it was the approximate size of that of Palaeotherium curtum but had different molar morphologies from it and the small-sized "P. minus", establishing the name P. ovinum. In 1847, the French palaeontologist Auguste Pomel erected the Palaeotherium subgenus Plagiolophus, which he reclassified P. minus to. The genus name derives from the Ancient Greek words πλαγιοϛ ("oblique") and λοφος ("crest") meaning "oblique crest".

British palaeontologist Richard Owen in 1848 wrote about a nearly complete lower jaw with both deciduous (or milk teeth) and permanent dental sets that was uncovered from the Eocene beds of Hordle, England, by Alexander Pytts Falconer, observing that it had one less premolar for a total of three of them than in other species of Palaeotherium and erecting the genus Paloplotherium and the species Paloplotherium annectens based on the mandible. He then described a cranium belonging to Paloplotherium that similarly had nearly complete dentition but evolutionarily lost a premolar. After comparing the dentition to those of both Palaeotherium and Anoplotherium, he determined that the dentition of Paloplotherium was similar to that of the former but differed mainly by the absence of the first premolar. He wrote that the permanent dental formula of Paloplotherium is 3.1.3.33.1.3.3 for a total of 40 teeth. Paloplotherium derives from the Ancient Greek words παλαιός ("ancient"), ὅπλον ("arms"), and θήρ ("wild beast") meaning "ancient armed beast".

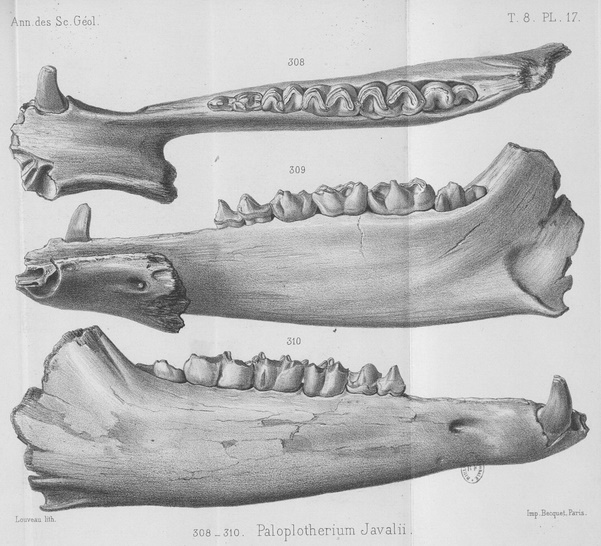
Mandible of P. javali

In 1852, German palaeontologist Christian Erich Hermann von Meyer, recognizing Plagiolophus as a distinct genus and emending Plagiolophus minus to Plagiolophus minor, erected the species P. fraasi based on fossils from the German locality of Frohnstetten originally found by Oscar Fraas. Fraas had studied fossils of palaeotheres from Frohnstetten since 1851, assembling a complete skeleton of P. minor using fossils from there in 1853. In 1853, Pomel listed in the genus Plagiolophus multiple previously recognized species, namely P. ovinus (reclassified from Palaeotherium and emended from P. ovinum), P. minor, and P. annectens (by extent synonymizing Paloplotherium with Plagiolophus). He also erected another species P. tenuirostris. In 1862, Swiss palaeontologist Ludwig Ruetimeyer established P. minutus based on dental remains from the Swiss locality of Egerkingen.

Not all taxonomists agreed on Paloplotherium as a synonymous genus. In 1865 for example, French palaeontologist Jean Albert Gaudry recognized Paloplotherium as valid genus instead of Plagiolophus, grouping P. minor, P. ovinus, and P. annectens into it and erecting another species P. codiciense. In 1869, Swiss palaeontologists François Jules Pictet de la Rive and Aloïs Humbert wrote that Palaeotherium, Paloplotherium, and Plagiolophus were all valid genera and erected two species for the latter: P. siderolithicus using fossil molars from a museum collection and P. valdensis based on a mandible that was smaller in proportion than that of P. minor. In 1877, French naturalist Henri Filhol erected Paloplotherium Javalii based on fossil jaws including that from the fossil collection of the French official Ernest Javal, who he named the species after. (Note: Due to archaic species naming conventions, authors of the 19th and 20th centuries tended to capitalize species names based on individuals or places.) Ruetimeyer in 1891 erected another species Paloplotherium magnum, stating that its size would have been that of Palaeotherium magnum.

In addition to the now-lost skeleton studied originally by Georges Cuvier in 1804, several other incomplete skeletons have been described by other palaeontologists. Skeletal elements were figured by Cuvier and later Blainville in 1839–1864, and the latter naturalist also figured skeletal elements from the French commune of Monthyon surrounding the skeleton whose whereabouts are also unclear.^{165} P. minor is also known from another assembled skeleton that was originally documented by Fraas in the later 19th century, although Stehlin referenced that Fraas paid little attention to studying the limb bones.

==== 20th- and 21st-century taxonomy ====
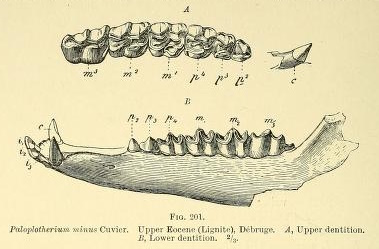
Upper dentition (top) and mandible (bottom) of P. minor

In 1901, researchers Charles Depéret and G. Carrière designated the species name Paloplotherium lugdunense to fossil material originally from the fossil deposits from the French commune of Lissieu. They said that the species was barely larger than P. codiciense and that it was also known from the locality of Robiac. In 1902, Swiss palaeontologist Hans Georg Stehlin erected Paloplotherium Rütimeyeri, but he only wrote that it was known from Egerkingen and did not elaborate further on it. In 1904, Stehlin synonymized Paloplotherium magnum with Palaeotherium castrense and erected two species of Plagiolophus: P. nouleti from a fossil mandible from the French commune of Viviers-lès-Montagnes and P. cartailhaci using fossils from the commune of Peyregoux. In one of his monographies, written the same year, Stehlin erected Palaeotherium Rütimeyeri to replace the previous name Paloplotherium Rütimeyeri (the former being formally defined from fossil material) and synonymized Paloplotherium javali with Plagiolophus fraasi. He also erected the species P. cartieri based on Egerkingen fossils, arguing that its size was between P. annectens and P. minor plus that its fossils resembled those of P. codidiciensis. Stehlin additionally questioned the distinction and validity of P. tenuirostris from P. minor. In 1917, Depéret erected the species P. oweni (also recognizing it by the name P. annectens mut. Oweni) from fossils in the commune of Gargas, arguing that it was a more advanced species of Plagiolophus based on the size and morphology of its premolars. He also reclassified "Paloplotherium" codiciense into its own genus Paraplagiolophus. In 1965, French palaeontologist Jean Albert Remy erected the genus Leptolophus, reclassifying P. nouleti into the taxon.

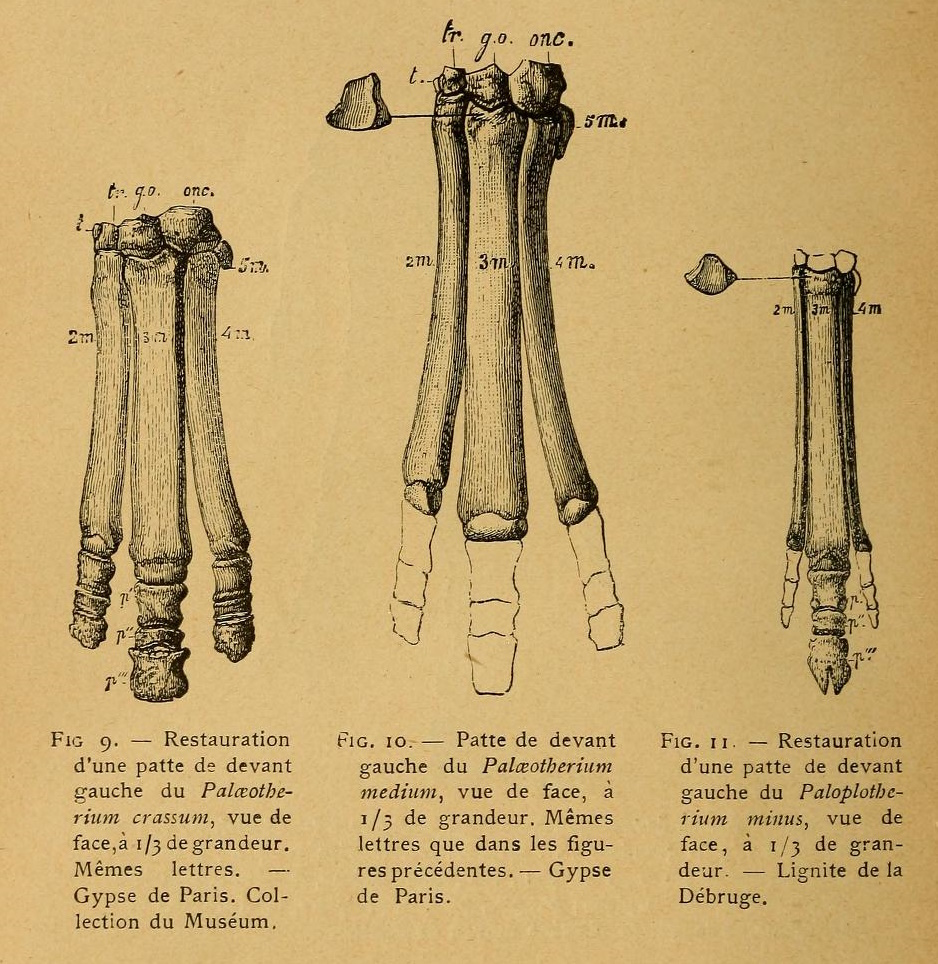
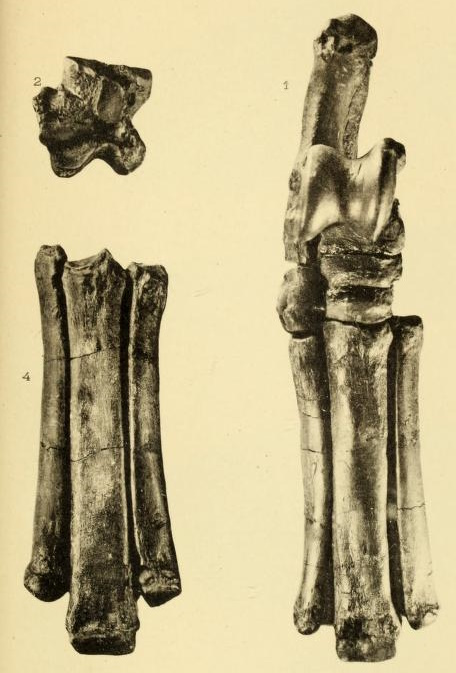
1888 sketches of limb bones of Palaeotherium and Plagiolophus minor (left) and an image of the limb bones of Plagiolophus annectens (right)

In 1986, British palaeontologist Jerry J. Hooker listed Paloplotherium as a synonym of Palaeotherium and listed P. minor, P. cartieri, P. lugdunensis (emended name), P. cartailhaci, P. annectens, P. fraasi, and P. javalii as valid species, although he doubted that P. javalii was distinct from P. fraasi. He also erected P. curtisi using fossils from fragmentary cranial remains from the Barton Beds of the UK and recognized two subspecies: P. curtisi curtisi and P. curtisi creechensis. The species was named after an individual named R.J. Curtis, who found the specimens for the former subspecies. In 1989, palaeontologists Michel Brunet and Yves Jehenne considered Paloplotherium to be distinct from Palaeotherium and erected for the former genus two additional species: P. majus from the fossil collections of the Quercy Phosphorites Formation and P. ministri from the French commune of Villebramar. Remy in 1994, however, rejected the claim by Brunet and Jehenne that Paloplotherium was a distinct genus from Plagiolophus, instead suggesting to convert the former into a Plagiolophus subgenus.

In 1994, Spanish palaeontologist Miguel Ángel Cuesta Ruiz-Colmenares erected two Plagiolophus species, the first being P. casasecaensis, named after the Spanish municipality of Casaseca de Campeán within the Duero Basin. The second species he recognized was P. mazateronensis, also from the Duero Basin; it was named after the Mazaterón province in the municipality of Soria. In 1997, another Spanish palaeontologist Lluís Checa Soler analyzed a dental specimen, stating his belief that it belonged to Plagiolophus and that the species would be defined by its smaller size and primitive characteristics compared to other species. He proposed the name P. plesiomorphicus but sought to not formally define it until more complete material assignable to the species was found.

In 2000, Remy described a skull of a male Plagiolophus individual that was within a sandstone block originally from the French department of Vaucluse, assigning it the new species name P. huerzeleri. The species was named after Johannes Hürzeler, Swiss palaeontologist and former director of the osteology department of the Natural History Museum of Basel. Remy had also emended P. majus to P. major and suggested both Plagiolophus and Paloplotherium as valid subgenera for Plagiolophus. Remy, in 2004, followed up by erecting P. ringeadei, named after Ruch fossil deposit discoverer Michel Ringead and known by a skull of an adult female with cheek teeth, and P. mamertensis, which was based on a left maxilla from Robiac. He also listed P. minutus and P. plesiomorphicus both as nomen dubia (doubtful taxon names with no distinguishing features). Remy reiterated both Plagiolophus and Paloplotherium as subgenera for Plagiolophus and created a third subgenus, Fraasiolophus.^{30–31}

=== Classification and evolution ===
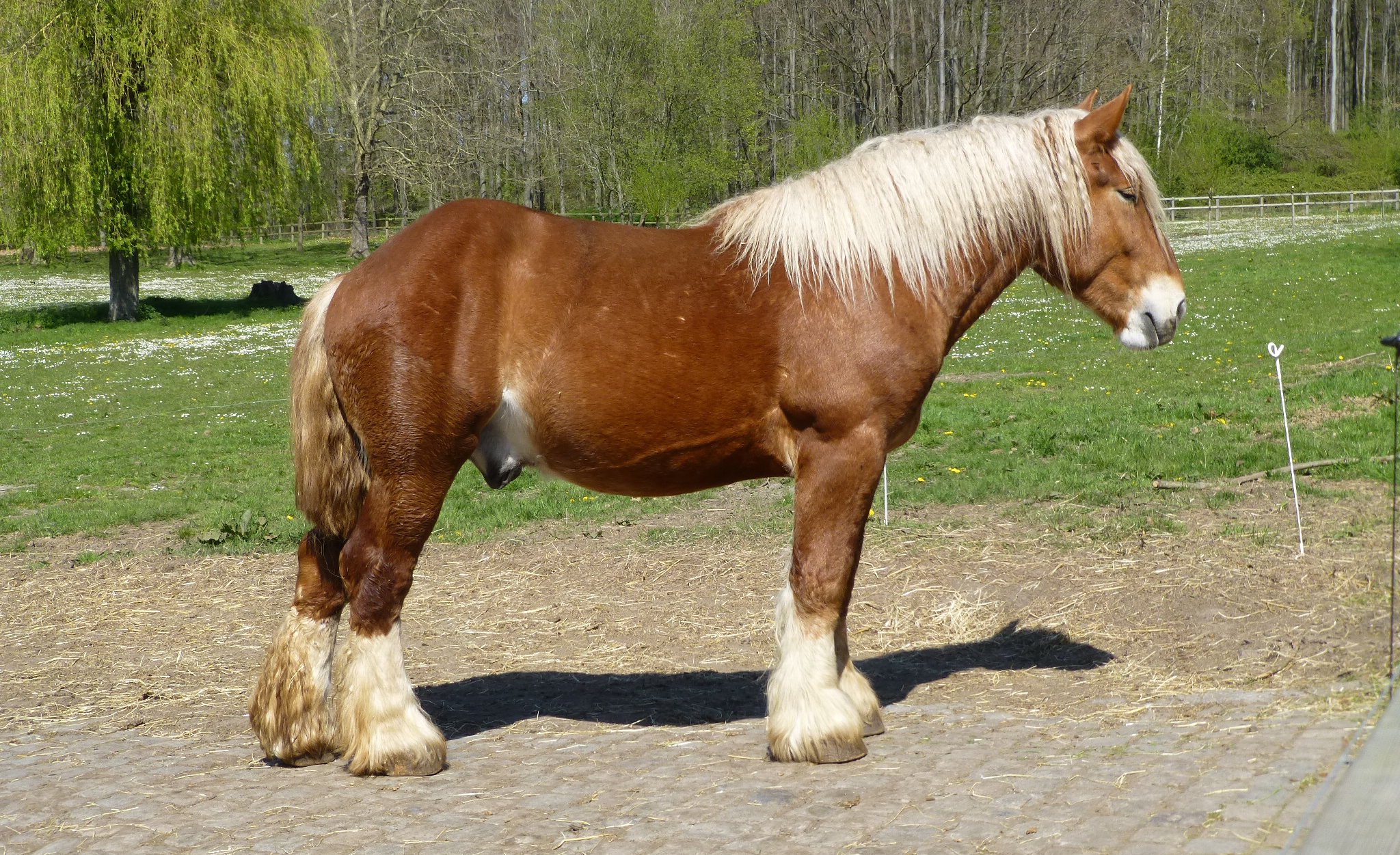
Horses and other equids are commonly defined as the closest relatives of palaeotheres and are typically grouped within the superfamily Equoidea.

Plagiolophus belongs to the Palaeotheriidae, largely considered to be one of two major hippomorph families in the superfamily Equoidea, the other being the Equidae. Alternatively, some authors have proposed that equids are more closely related to the Tapiromorpha than to the Palaeotheriidae. It is also usually thought to consist of two families, the Palaeotheriinae and Pachynolophinae; a few authors alternatively have argued that pachynolophines are more closely related to other perissodactyl groups than to palaeotheriines. Some authors have also considered the Plagiolophinae to be a separate subfamily, while others group its genera into the Palaeotheriinae. Plagiolophus has also been suggested to belong to the tribe Plagiolophini, one of three proposed tribes within the Palaeotheriinae along with the Leptolophini and Palaeotheriini.^{29–30} The Eurasian distribution of the palaeotheriids (or palaeotheres) were in contrast to equids, which are generally thought to have been an endemic radiation in North America. Some of the most basal equoids of the European landmass are of uncertain affinities, with some genera being thought to potentially belong to the Equidae. Palaeotheriids are well known for having lived in western Europe during much of the Palaeogene but were also present in eastern Europe, possibly the Middle East, and, in the case of pachynolophines (or pachynolophs), Asia.

The Perissodactyla makes its earliest known appearance in the European landmass in the MP7 faunal unit of the Mammal Palaeogene zones. During the temporal unit, many genera of basal equoids such as Hyracotherium, Pliolophus, Cymbalophus, and Hallensia made their first appearances there. A majority of the genera persisted to the MP8-MP10 units, and pachynolophines such as Propalaeotherium and Orolophus arose by MP10. The MP13 unit saw the appearances of later pachynolophines such as Pachynolophus and Anchilophus along with definite records of the first palaeotheriines such as Palaeotherium and Paraplagiolophus. The palaeotheriine Plagiolophus has been suggested to have potentially made an appearance by MP12. It was by MP14 that the subfamily proceeded to diversify, and the pachynolophines were generally replaced but still reached the late Eocene. In addition to more widespread palaeothere genera such as Plagiolophus, Palaeotherium, and Leptolophus, some of their species reaching medium to large sizes, various other palaeothere genera that were endemic to the Iberian Peninsula, such as Cantabrotherium, Franzenium, and Iberolophus, appeared by the middle Eocene.

The phylogenetic tree for several members of the family Palaeotheriidae within the order Perissodactyla (including three outgroups (only distantly related taxa)) as created by Remy in 2017 and followed by Remy et al. in 2019 is defined below:

- - - Cardiolophus radinskyi
    - Hallensia matthesi
  - Pliolophus vulpiceps
  - Palaeotheriidae
    - Hyracotherium leporinum
    - - "Hyracotherium" levei
      - - "Hyracotherium" remyi
        - - Orolophus maldani
          - - Pachynolophus
              - - P. sp. AUM
                - P. duvali
              - - P. ruscassierensis
                - - P. eulaliensis
                  - - P. livinierensis
                    - P. cesserasicus
            - - - - Lophiotherium
                    - L. sp. AUM
                    - L. pygmaeum
                    - L. cervulum
                  - Eurohippus parvulus
                - Propalaeotherium hassiacum
              - - Propalaeotherium cf. gaudryi AUM
                - - Propalaeotherium gaudryi
                  - - Propalaeotherium sudrei
                    - - Propalaeotherium isselanum
                      - Palaeotheriinae
                        - Leptolophus nouleti
                        - - Plagiolophus minor
                          - Palaeotherium magnum

As shown in the above phylogeny, the Palaeotheriidae is defined as a monophyletic clade, meaning that it did not leave any derived descendant groups in its evolutionary history. Hyracotherium sensu stricto (in a strict sense) is defined as amongst the first offshoots of the family and a member of the Pachynolophinae. "H." remyi, formerly part of the now-invalid genus Propachynolophus, is defined as a sister taxon to more derived palaeotheriids. Both Pachynolophus and Lophiotherium, defined as pachynolophines, are defined as monophyletic genera. The other pachynolophines Eurohippus and Propalaeotherium constitute a paraphyletic clade (or phylogenetic group excluding descendant lineages) in relation to members of the derived and monophyletic subfamily Palaeotheriinae (Leptolophus, Plagiolophus, and Palaeotherium), thus making Pachynolophinae a paraphyletic subfamily clade in relation to the palaeotheriine descendants.

=== Inner systematics ===
Unlike Palaeotherium where many species have subspecies, Plagiolophus only has one species with defined subspecies, P. curtisi. All species of Plagiolophus are classified in one of three subgenera. The following table defines the species and subspecies of Plagiolophus and additional information about them:

Comparative table of Plagiolophus lineages
Lineage	Proposed subgenus	MP unit(s)	Author(s) of taxon	Taxon publication year
P. annectens	Paloplotherium	16, 17	Owen	1848
P. cartailhaci	Paloplotherium	16	Stehlin	1904
P. cartieri	Paloplotherium	12?, 13, 14	Stehlin	1904
P. casasecaensis	Paloplotherium	13	Cuesta	1994
P. curtisi curtisi	Paloplotherium	16	Hooker	1986
P. curtisi creechensis	Paloplotherium	16	Hooker	1986
P. fraasi	Fraasiolophus	20	von Meyer	1852
P. huerzeleri	Plagiolophus	23	Remy	2000
P. javali	Plagiolophus	25	Filhol	1877
P. lugdunensis	Paloplotherium	14	Depéret & Carrière	1901
P. major	Paloplotherium	20	Brunet & Jehenne	1989
P. mamertensis	Paloplotherium	16	Remy	2004
P. mazateronensis	Paloplotherium	16, 17	Cuesta	1994
P. ministri	Plagiolophus	22	Brunet & Jehenne	1989
P. minor	Plagiolophus	18, 19, 20, 21, 22	Cuvier	1804
P. ovinus	Plagiolophus	21	Aymard	1846
P. oweni	Paloplotherium	18	Depéret	1917
P. ringeadei	Plagiolophus	21	Remy	2004

== Description ==
=== Skull ===
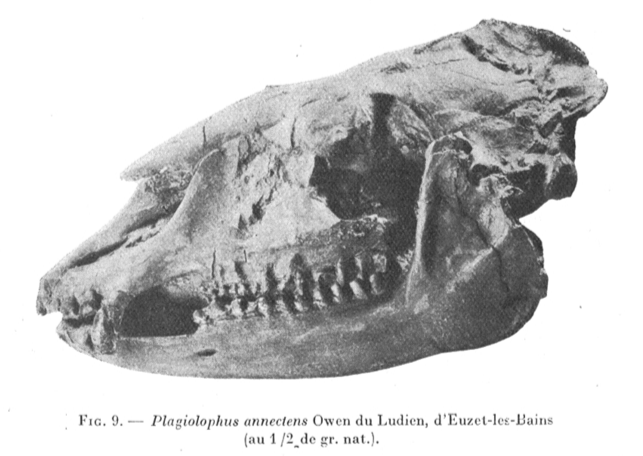
1935 photograph of P. annectens skull from Euzet-les-Bains

The Palaeotheriidae is distinguished in part by generally having orbits (eye sockets) that are wide open in the back area and are located in the middle of the skull or slightly in front of it. The nasal bones are slightly extensive to very extensive in depth. The skull lengths vary by species within the Plagiolophus genus, ranging from 170 mm (6.7 in) to 400 m (1,300 ft). It is defined by many other unique cranial traits, among them being the skull's elongated facial region, especially in later species, that is more well developed compared to that of Palaeotherium. The maxilla, at the area of the canine, is wide; the muzzle in comparison is narrow. The nasal notch, found on the front lower edge of the maxilla, is generally deep, ranges from P^{1} (the first upper premolar) to M^{1} (first upper molar), and has its lower edges formed the premaxilla and maxilla. The zygomatic arch is narrow and elevates up to the back of the orbit.^{32} The subgenus Plagiolophus is defined by a shallow nasal notch that is always located in front of P^{2}, the lack of any preorbital fossa (shallow bone area) and a thinner body of the mandible compared to that of Paloplotherium. Paloplotherium contrasts from Plagiolophus in having a deep nasal notch is always behind P^{2} and a larger skull size, but the former also shares the lack of any preorbital fossae. Plagiolophus also differs from Paloplotherium in having a thinner horizontal ramus of the mandible. Fraasiolophus differs from the other two subgenera solely by the presence of a deep preorbital fossa.^{33, 77, 117}

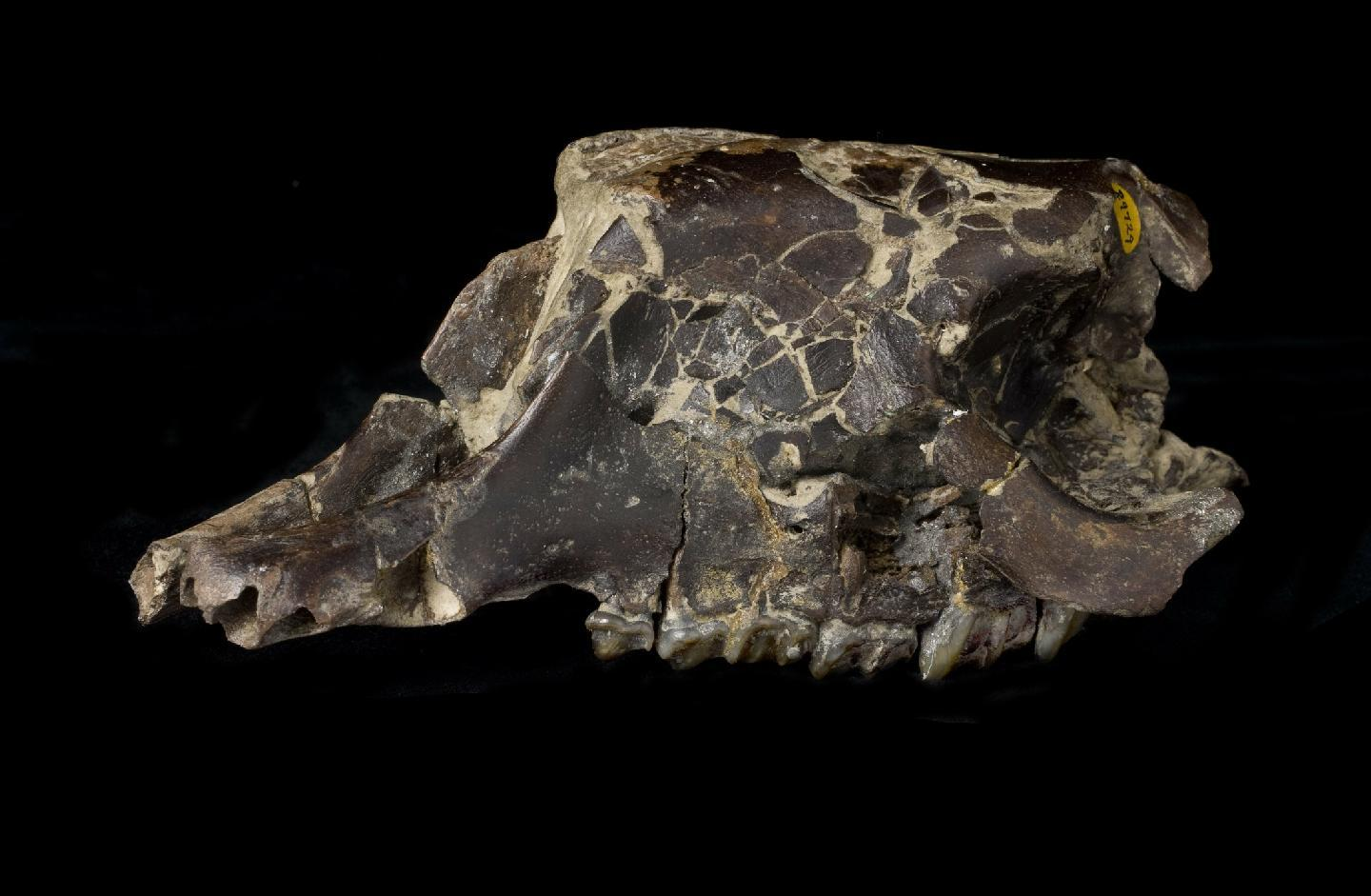
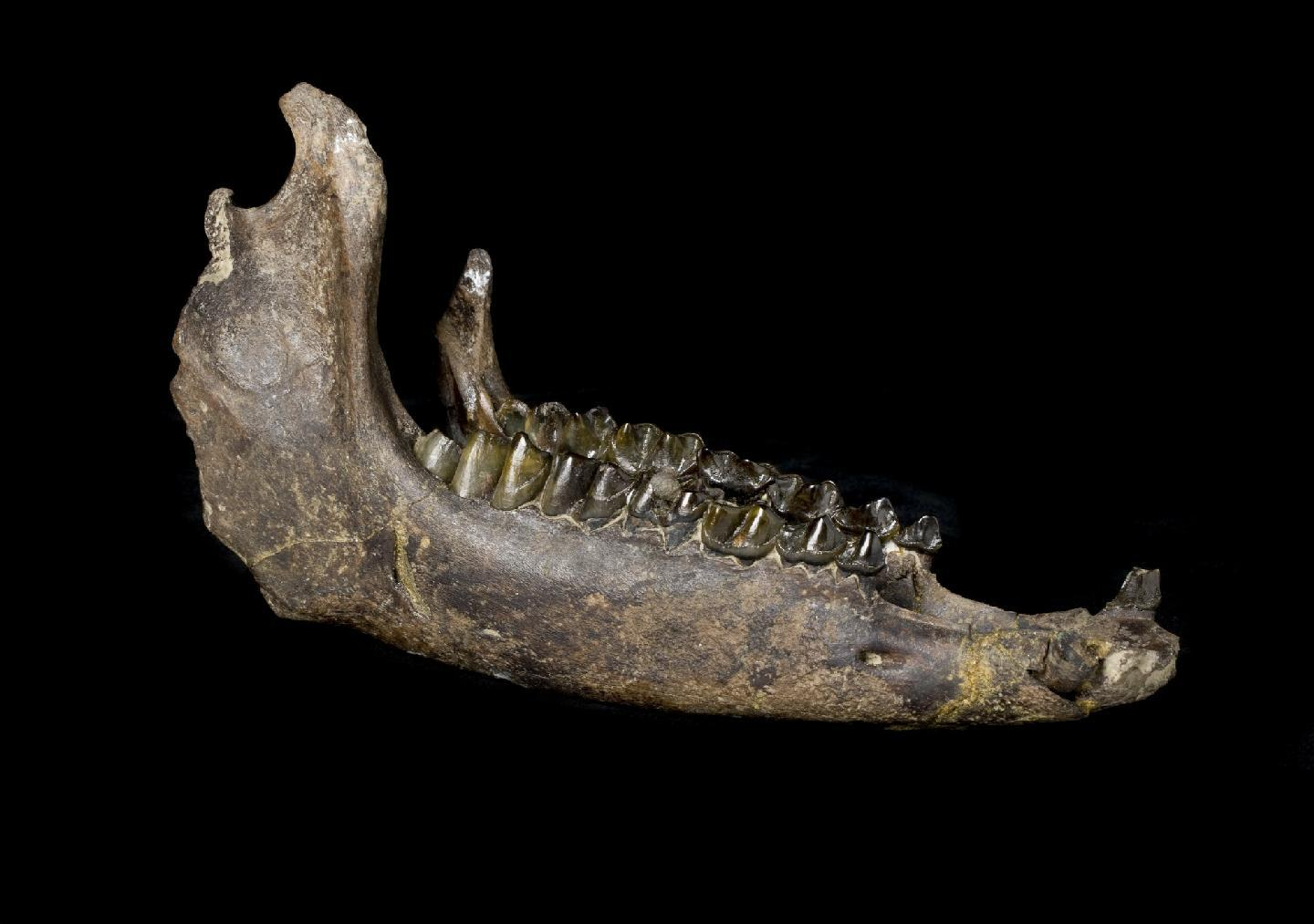
P. annectens skull remains (partial cranium left, mandible right), held at the fossil collections of the Natural History Museum, London

The skull of Plagiolophus appears slightly triangular in shape at a dorsoventral (upper and lower) view, has a maximum width either above or in front of where the mandible articulates with other skull bones, and has a wider front area compared to that of Leptolophus. The skull length of Plagiolophus generally increased over time as part of an evolutionary trend of species. For instance, the skull of P. huerzeleri, one of the latest species to have existed, has a more elongated and skull (making it more equinelike) than that of P. annectens, an earlier-appearing species; the former species also has a longer anterior orbital region, a higher orbit position, implying different arrangements of facial muscles compared to the latter. The orbit of Plagiolophus is slightly behind the midlength of the skull, making its position more similar to that of the Palaeogene equid Mesohippus than the more forward orbit of Palaeotherium. The nasal opening in Plagiolophus is positioned higher than that of Propalaeotherium and varies in form by species, generally becoming less hollow in later species contrary to the evolutionary trends observed in Palaeotherium.^{154–156}

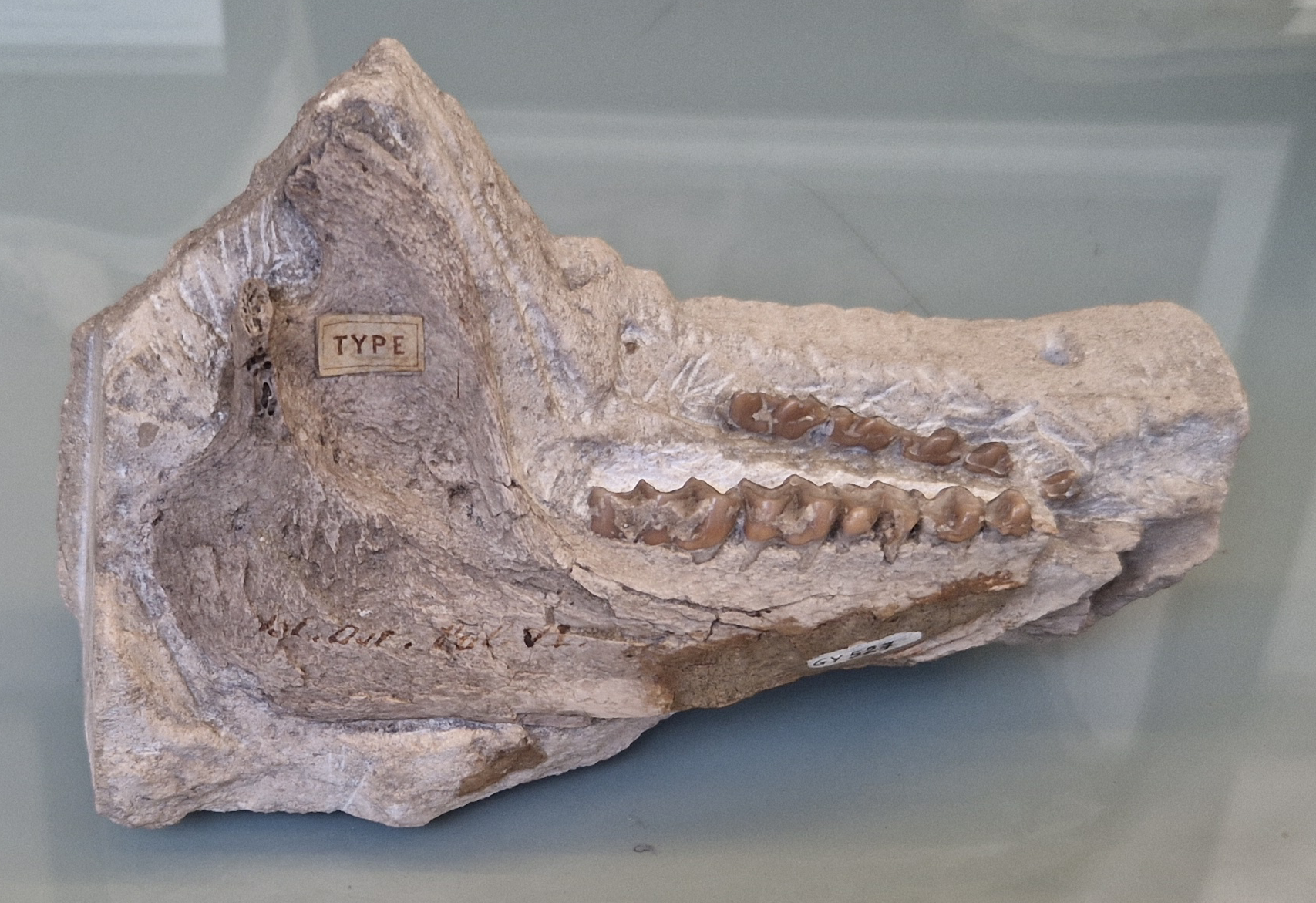
P. minor mandible, National Museum of Natural History, France

The body of the premaxilla is elongated but low in height. The palatine bone stretches up to the lacrimal bone. The optic foramen, located on the sphenoid bone, is larger than that of Palaeotherium; it is separated from other foramina like in other palaeotheres and stretches more forwards compared to equines. Those of P. annectens and P. minor pierce through the skull and connect with each other as part of a single optic canal path; those of P. cartieri and species originating from the Oligocene have thick septa, or anatomical walls that separate them and therefore lead to two different optic canals for each foramen. The snout's tip is broad at the canines, especially in males, and has strong post-canine constrictions unlike with Palaeotherium. The sagittal crest (midline of skull's top) and nuchal lines are both well developed, the latter displaying stronger sexual dimorphism and therefore being more prominent in males (defined based on modern mammalian analogues). The post-orbital constriction occurs behind the postorbital process like in most other palaeotheres but unlike in Palaeotherium.^{156–159}

The postglenoid process, located in the squamous part of the temporal bone, is large in both Plagiolophus and Palaeotherium and has parallel front and back walls. The process is where the hollowing of the ear canal's roof is located, taking different shapes in different species. The underside of the ear canal does not take a canalized form except in P. huerzeleri. The petrous part of the temporal bone largely contacts the basilar part of the occipital bone and is slightly hollowed.^{158–159}

The mandibular symphysis, where each half of the mandible join, is elongated and contains projecting incisors. The horizontal ramus (or body) of the mandible is wide from front to back and has a prominent coronoid process (or a type of bone projection). The horizontal ramus of the mandible is robust but varies in features according to species and sex, its underside being mostly convex but also straight at the front area. The vertical ramus is extensive like in Palaeotherium but is wider at the area of articulation. The condyloid process of the mandible, which articulates with the temporal bone, is narrow, elongated, and sloped. The coronoid process of the mandible is wide like in Palaeotherium but may sometimes be wider; it is able to support temporalis muscles well for chewing.^{159–160}

=== Dentition ===
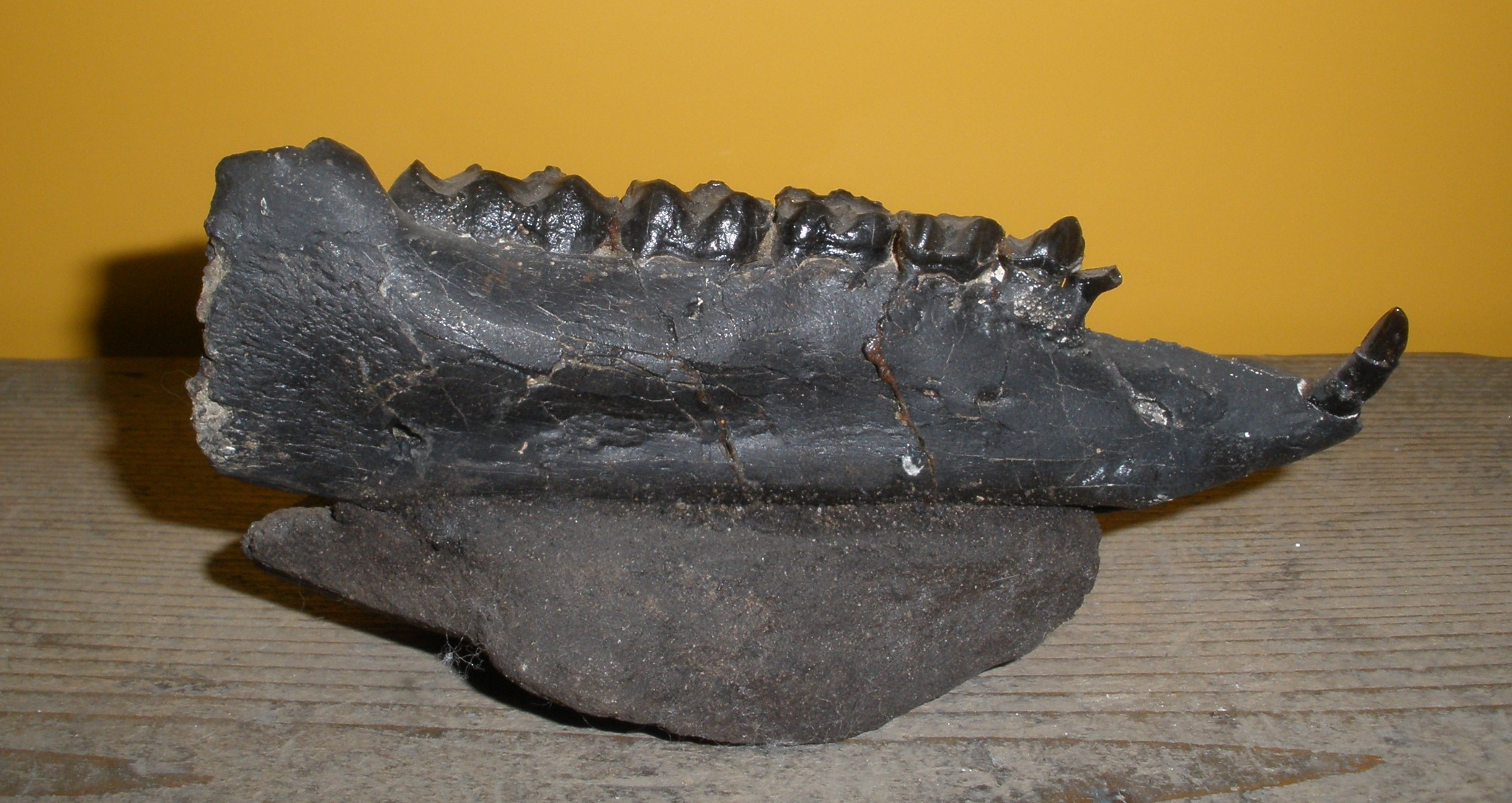
P. annectens mandible, Milan Natural History Museum

Derived palaeotheres are generally diagnosed as having selenolophodont (selenodont (crescent-shaped ridges) and lophodont (transverse ridges)) upper molars and selenodont lower molars that are mesodont, or medium-crowned, in height. The canines strongly protrude and are separated from the premolars by medium to long diastemata (gaps between teeth) and from the incisors by short ones in both the upper and lower dentition. The other teeth are paired closely with each other in both the upper and lower rows. Plagiolophus is defined by brachyodont (low-crowned) dentitions that became progressively hypsodont (high-crowned) to semi-hypsodont evolutionarily, the premolars being semi-molarized and the molars increasing in size from the front end to the back end of the dental row. The dental formula of Plagiolophus is 3.1.3-4.33.1.3-4.3, totaling at 42 to 44 teeth present.^{32, 122} It differs from Leptolophus in appearing less lophodont and lesser degree of heterodonty (more than one tooth morphology) in its cheek teeth. Plagiolophus also differs from Paraplagiolophus in having cheek teeth that appear narrower and more lophodont. The postcanine diastemata of Plagiolophus are longer than those of Palaeotherium but display varying degrees of such based on sex and species. The subgenus Plagiolophus differs from Paloplotherium by its longer postcanine diastemata and greater degree of hypsodonty, and the former has proportionally narrow and oblique lingual lophs in its upper cheek teeth compared to that of the latter. The latter also has a stronger degree of heterodonty from its premolars and smaller internal cusps compared to the former.

While not all species of Plagiolophus are currently known by fossil incisors, the incisors of known species reveal a common trait of chisel-like shapes typical of the equoids. The outermost edges of the incisors are of identical lengths but take different forms from each other. The edges of the incisors are sharp and thin, giving them flat appearances. The frontmost incisors, the first incisors, have elongated labial (or front in relation to the mouth) faces that are equal in size to that of Palaeotherium but smaller than that of Leptolophus. The lingual (back) face is shorter than the labial face, takes a concave shape, and is surrounded by a cingulum that ascends up to the outermost edge of the incisor. I_{1} is inclined and appears to project forward. The second and third incisors have less symmetrical crown shapes compared to the first. Both I^{2} and I_{2} have somewhat oblique outermost edges. The third incisors appear to be the most differentiated incisor variants and are the smallest ones. The canines have labial surfaces that are convex compared to their lingual counterparts. The widths of the canines vary because of sexual dimorphism. While the upper canines appear to be inclined forward and outwards due to the positions of their roots, the lower canines and their crowns have straighter positions, although the crowns diverge as well.^{145–146}

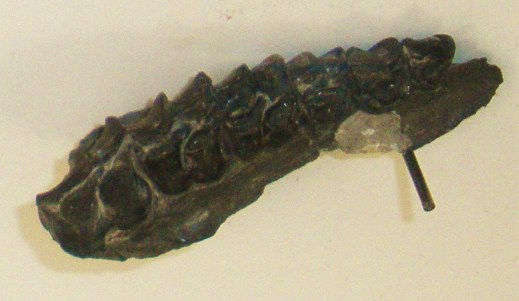
P. minor dentition, Natural History Museum, London

The oldest species of Plagiolophus had four upper and lower premolars whereas later species evolutionarily lost one premolar in each jaw. However, P. annectens has well-documented deciduous premolars, totaling at four in front of each first permanent molar before they are replaced by the three permanent premolars.^{122–123} Remy argued that the first deciduous premolar was replaced by the first permanent premolar based on juvenille dentition of P. annectens, but Kenneth D. Rose et al. in 2017 argued that Remy's hypothesis requires further research for proof. Most adult P. annectens individuals have no reported deciduous or permanent first premolars in either jaw, probably due to displacement by the second premolars. The first premolar, when present, appears to be small, elongated, and narrow. The metacone cusp of P^{3} evolutionarily shrunk over time, and P^{4} at least sometimes lost its mesostyle cusp and often lost hypocone cusp. P_{4} has a high talonid cusp but lacks any entoconid cusp; the entoconid of P_{3} in comparison is short and a crescentlike shape. Within the molars, the ectoloph crest tends to stick out over the large cusps. The coronal cementum (bone-like tissue covering the tooth's root) on the cheek teeth tend to thicken from the front end to the back end of the dental arch, and it tended to grow evolutionarily thicker over time. Paloplotherium sometimes lacks any coronal cementum. Within the upper molars, each ectoloph lobe has a middle rib developed on them. The paraconule cusp is separated from the protocone cusp, and the metaloph ridge only touches the ectoloph at advanced stages of dental wear. The crescents of the lower molars are separate from each other. Except for those in deciduous molars, the metastylid and metaconid cusps are nearly identical to each other. The internal cingulids (or ridges) of the lower molars are reduced or gone.^{32}

=== Postcranial skeleton ===
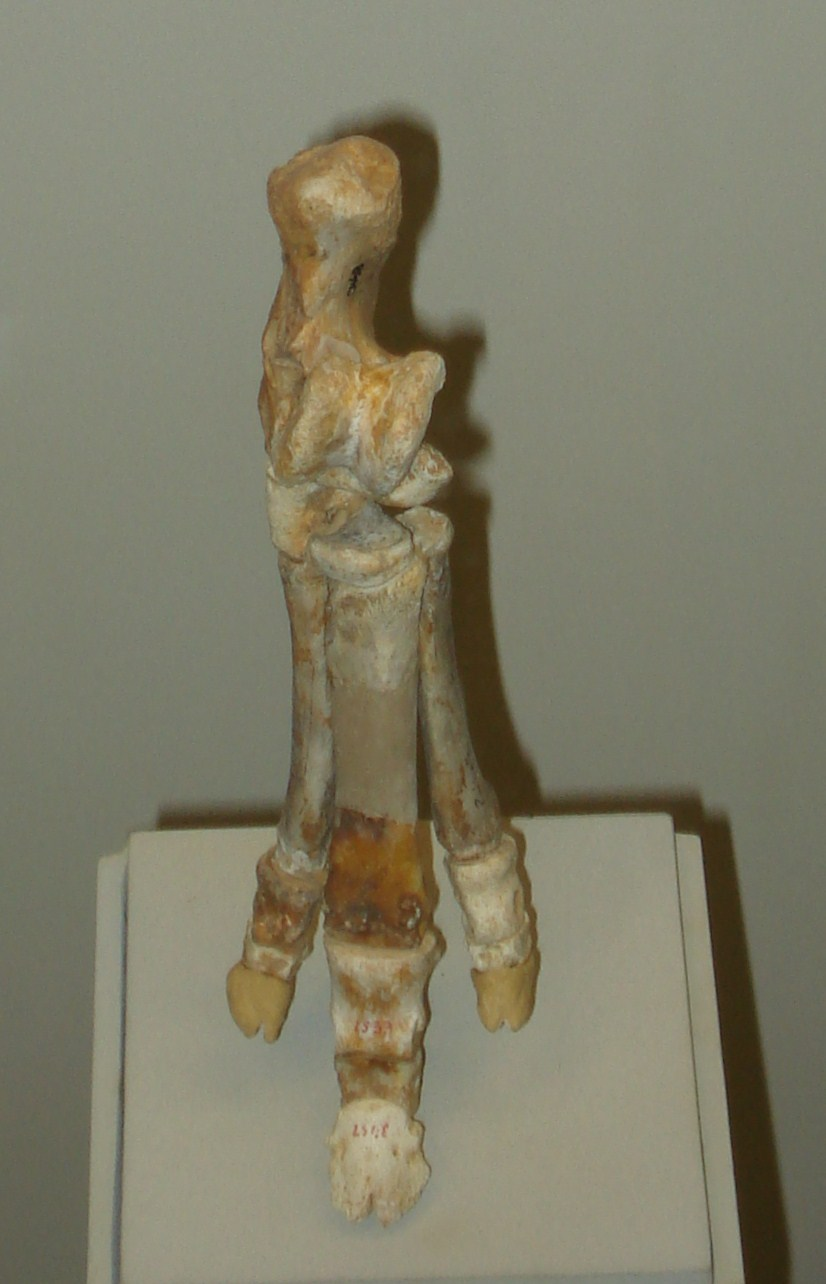
Plagiolophus sp. back limb, State Museum of Natural History, Stuttgart

Several skeletons of P. minor have been observed like that of a pregnant individual studied like Cuvier in 1804 (now lost) and another that was studied and assembled by Fraas.^{165} The postcranial anatomy of palaeotheriids is not well studied and require further study at the genus level. He said if the skeletal images as drawn by Cuvier and Blainville are accurate, then the back of P. minor appears convex, its peak being on par with the last thoracic vertebrae and its spinous processes of its lumbar vertebrae facing forward. Its arched back appears to be more similar to modern reconstructions of Propalaeotherium than to those of Palaeotherium. The cervical vertebrae of both Plagiolophus and Palaeotherium are elongated. The caudal vertebrae of the tail have high spinous processes; the tail's end appears slender and pointed. The tail is short in length and slender in spite of being made up of many vertebrae.^{166–167}

Plagiolophus has several limb bone fossils attributed to it,^{165–168} although it is unclear as to whether the tarsal and metatarsal bones (both of the back limbs) from the Spanish locality of Roc de Santa are attributable to P. annectens or Anchilophus dumasi. It is tridactyl, or three-toed, in its forelimbs and hindlimbs like most species of the fellow palaeotheriine Palaeotherium and unlike the earlier pachynolophine Propalaeotherium. The scapula is forward-facing with a slightly narrow neck (its back being wider than its front) and a shortened upper edge. The iliac crest of the hip bone in Plagiolophus is concave in shape, contrasting with that of Palaeotherium which is convex. The foot bones of Plagiolophus are distinguished from those of Palaeotherium based on its foot bones being more slender and its side toes being lesser-developed (or smaller and thinner) and having less anatomical support from the articulating foot bones compared to its middle toe. P. minor has particularly slender foot bones; the morphologies of the limb bones suggest that it was better-adapted to cursoriality than any species of Palaeotherium and other palaeothere genera.^{32–33, 167–168} The cursoriality adaptation in multiple Plagiolophus species. along with Palaeotherium medium is supported by the elongated and gracile metacarpal bones which are of equal proportional lengths. P. ministri has similarly tall and narrow astragali (ankle bones), suggesting that its limb bone morphologies could have been similar to those of P. minor. The astragali of P. huerzeleri are slightly shorter and wider compared to those of P. ministri. Both species have slender limb bones roughly corresponding to those of P. minor. P. fraasi differs from the aforementioned Plagiolophus species by the side metapodial bones being visible from the foot's front and the neck of the astragalus being visible. The astragali of P. javali and P. annectens are both short and stocky. The limb bone morphologies of P. annectens, P. fraasi, and P. javali point towards short and robust legs that were less adapted towards cursoriality.^{167–168}

=== Size ===
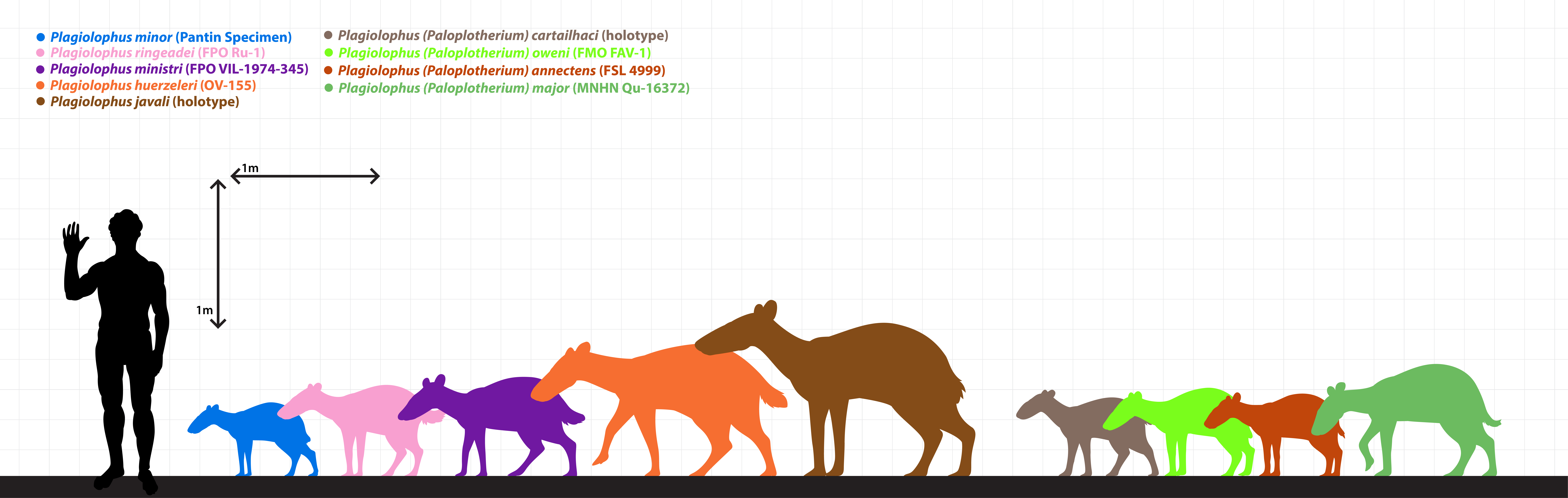
Estimated Plagiolophus species size comparisons based on known fossil specimens

Plagiolophus is characterized by the inclusion of small to medium-sized species, the skull base length ranging from 140 mm (5.5 in) to 400 mm (16 in) depending on the species. The length of the P^{2} to M^{3} dental row ranges from 60 mm (2.4 in) to 121 mm (4.8 in). According to Remy, the basicranial (lower part of the skull) length of the Ma-PhQ-349 skull specimen of P. minor could have measured 176 mm (6.9 in) to 179 mm (7.0 in) long. Despite having a high, wide, and robust skull, P. minor is the smallest species of its genus, with the basal skull length being less than or equal to 200 mm (7.9 in) and the P^{2} to M^{3} dental row measuring 69 mm (2.7 in). P. huerzeleri is mentioned to have been 20–25% larger than P. ministri with a basicranial length of 350 mm (14 in) and a P^{2} to M^{3} dental row length of 100 mm (3.9 in) to 118 mm (4.6 in). The mandibular dental row of P. fraasi could measure 90 mm (3.5 in) to 98 mm (3.9 in) long whereas that of P. major could reach 99 mm (3.9 in) to 109 mm (4.3 in) long. The former species has an estimated skull length of 300 mm (12 in) while the latter's skull length could have measured 350 mm (14 in). P. javali is known only from a male juvenile mandible with a dental row measuring 121.2 mm (4.77 in) long. With a potential adult skull length of about 400 mm (16 in), P. javali is probably the largest species of Plagiolophus.^{32, 34, 72, 75–76 98–99, 119–120}

Remy in 2004 calculated that the smallest species P. minor could have weighed less than 10 kg (22 lb). He also calculated P. huerzeleri to have a body weight range of 90 kg (200 lb) to 110 kg (240 lb). P. major has an estimated weight range of 90 kg (200 lb) to 110 kg (240 lb) while P. fraasi has an estimated weight range of 50 kg (110 lb) to 70 kg (150 lb). P. javali, as the largest species of Plagiolophus, could have had a body weight of over 150 kg (330 lb).^{72, 75–76, 98–99, 119, 154} Later in 2015, he placed a body weight estimate of P. annectens at about 50 kg (110 lb), P. cartailhaci at 99 kg (218 lb), and P. mamertensis at 77 kg (170 lb). Jamie A. MacLaren and Sandra Nauwelaerts in 2020 estimated the weight of P. minor at 19.3 kg (43 lb), P. annectens at 34.8 kg (77 lb), and P. major at 78.9 kg (174 lb). In 2022, Leire Perales-Gogenola et al. made five weight estimates of different populations of the same species of Plagiolophus. They stated that P. mazateronensis from Mazaterón has a body weight of 118.71 kg (261.7 lb). According to the authors, P. minor from St. Capraise d'Eymet potentially weighed 26.56 kg (58.6 lb), and P. ministri from Villebramar weighed 53.61 kg (118.2 lb). They also said that P. annectens from Euzet weighed 34.8 kg (77 lb) while the same species from Roc de Santa I measured 40.6 kg (90 lb). The same year, Perales-Gogenola et al. estimated that P. mazateronensis ranged in weight from 95 kg (209 lb) to 130 kg (290 lb).

=== Footprints ===
Palaeotheriids are known from footprint tracks assigned to ichnotaxa, among them being the ichnogenus Plagiolophustipus, named in 1989–1990 by R. Santamaria et al. and suggested to have belonged to Plagiolophus. The ichonogenus is dated to the early Oligocene of Spain and may originate from the locality of Montfalco d'Agramunt, which the sole species Plagiolophustipus montfalcoensis derives its name from. As a tridactyl footprint, it is diagnosed as having a middle digit that is much longer and wider than its two somewhat asymmetrical side digits. The ichonospecies measures between 5 cm (2.0 in) and 6 cm (2.4 in) total. The assignment of the ichnogenus to Plagiolophus is based on its middle digit being longer and wider than the other digits unlike that of Palaeotherium which has roughly equal sizes in all three of its toes.

The ichnogenus Palaeotheriipus, assigned to Palaeotherium, differs from Plagiolophustipus by its smaller and wider digits. Lophiopus, likely produced by Lophiodon, has more divergent outer digit imprints, while Rhinoceripeda, attributed to the Rhinocerotidae, differs by its oval shape and varying from three to five digits. Palaeotheriipus is known from both France and Iran whereas Plagiolophustipus is currently known from Spain. It is possible that the ichnospecies is correlated with P. huerzeleri or another medium to large species based on their temporal ranges.

Plagiolophustipus is also known by Plagiolophustipus ichsp. from the Spanish municipality of Mues in the province of Navarre, dating to the Oligocene. It is similar to Plagiolophustipus montfalcoensis because of the presence of three digits, the middle one of which is longer and wider than the other two side digits. The undefined ichnospecies could potentially have belonged a small to medium-sized palaeothere such as Plagiolophus.

== Palaeobiology ==
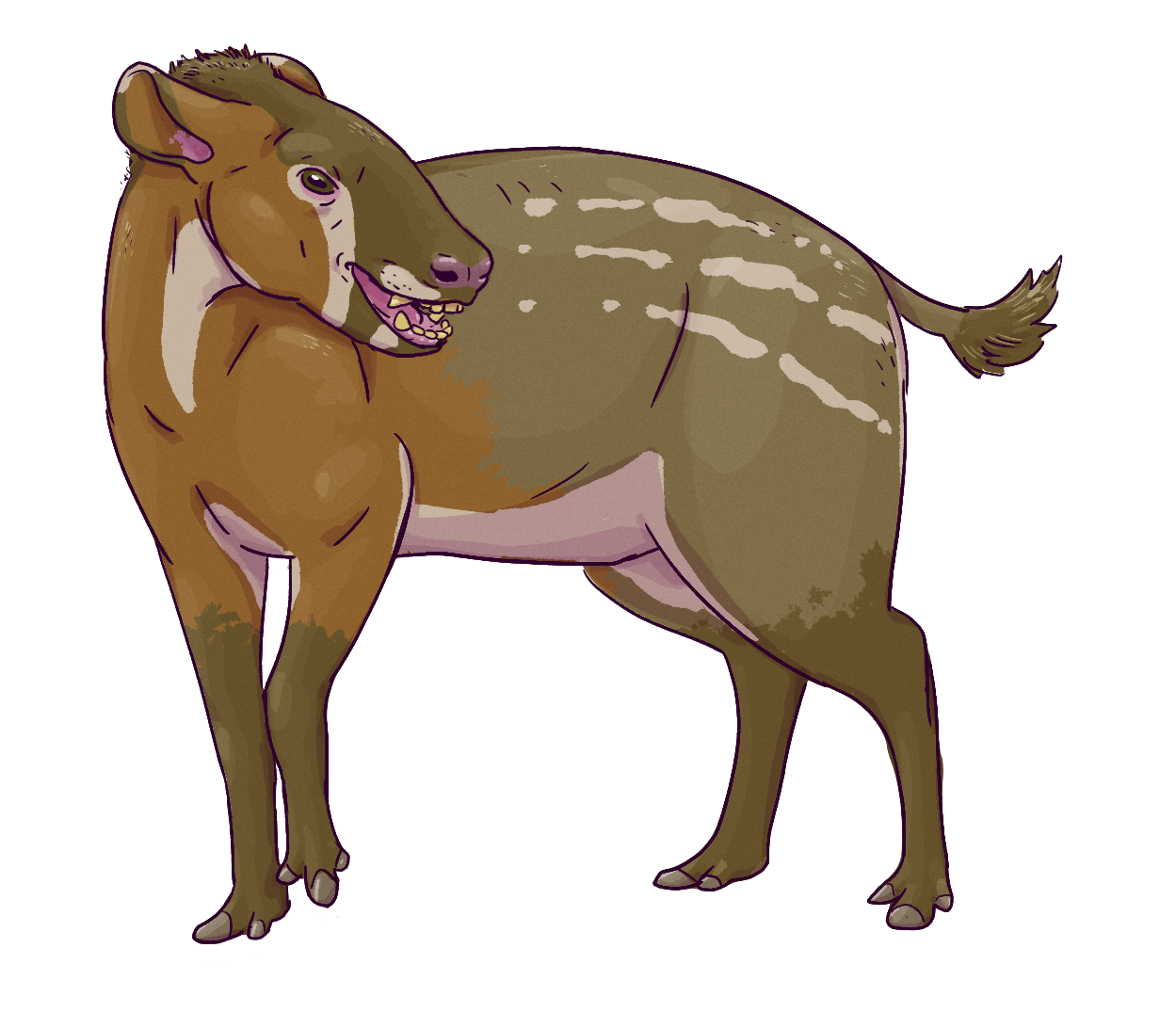
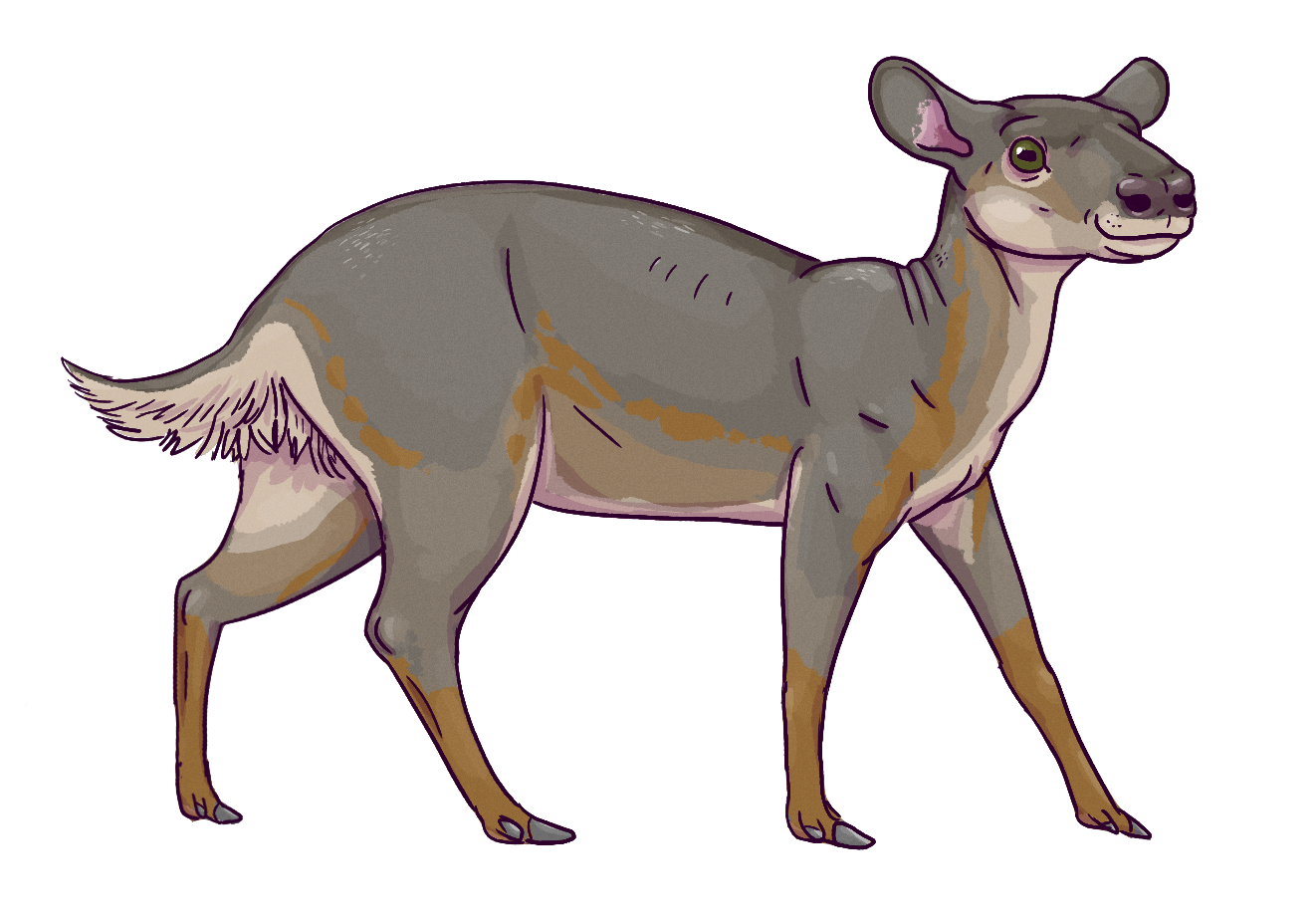
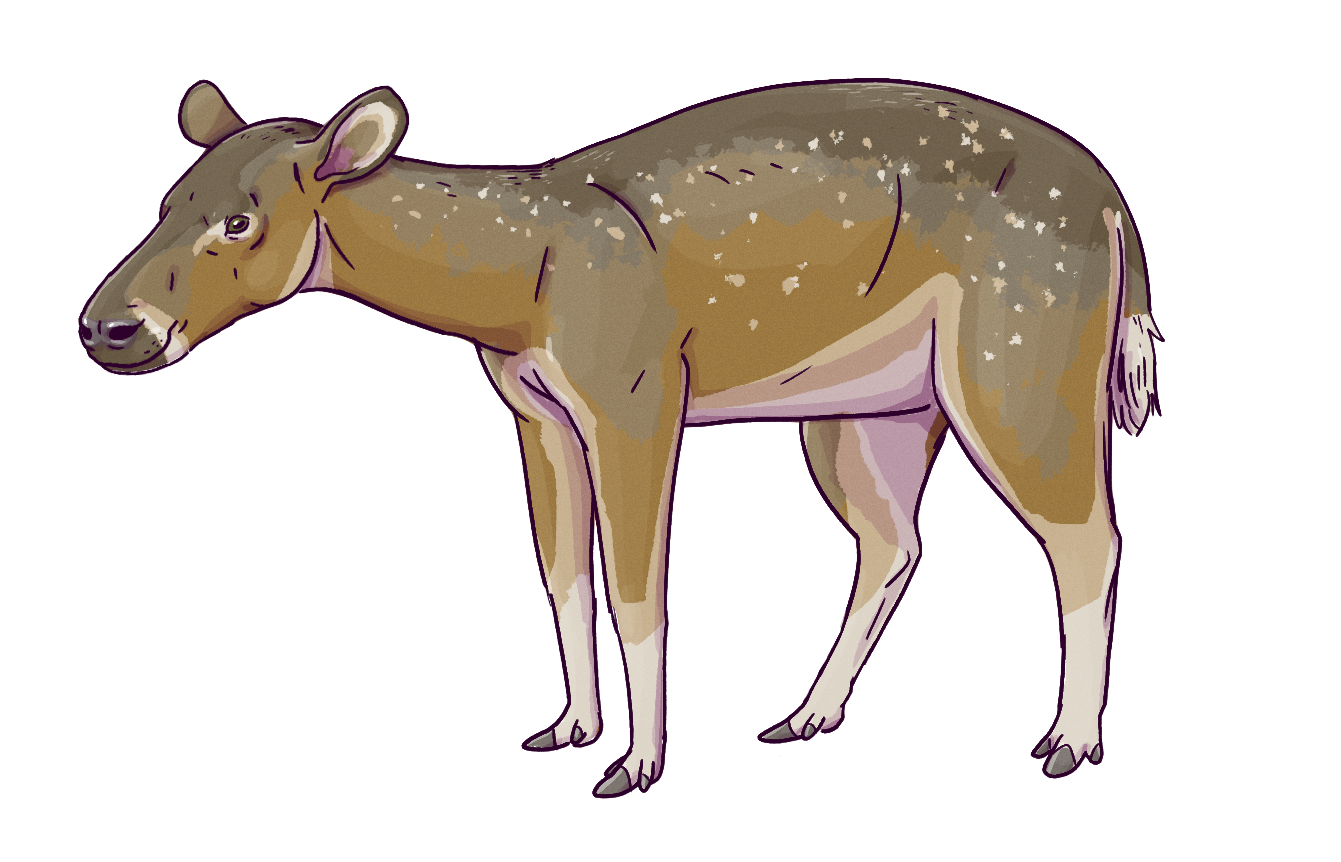
Life restorations of P. annectens (left), P. minor (center), and P. huerzeleri (right) based on skeletal evidence

Plagiolophus contains several species of a wide range of sizes that are known from postcranial fossils that suggest different paces of locomotion, with some having bulky builds and some others being more cursorial. Similar trends in limb morphological diversity and size diversity are also observed in the contemporaneous palaeothere Palaeotherium. The evolutionary history of the palaeotheres might have had emphasized macrosmatic (derived smell) traits rather than sight or hearing, evident by the smaller orbits and a seeming lack of a derived auditory system. The macrosmatic trait could have allowed palaeotheres to keep track of their herds, implying gregarious (or social) behaviours. This is evident in Plagiolophus based on an implied development of the rhinencephalon, a portion of the brain concerning smell, in P. minor.

Both Palaeotherium and Plagiolophus have dentitions that are capable of chewing through harder items such as fruits without wearing their teeth down quickly compared to their pachynolophine predecessors (i.e. Hyracotherium and Propalaeotherium). The shifts in dietary capabilities were the result of changes in the efficiencies of the mastication processes. The broader diets of the later palaeotheres are the result of their molars serving dual purposes of shearing food on the buccal side then crushing it on the lingual side unlike in equids and basal equoids. The two derived genera have brachyodont dentition, the hypsodonty index suggesting that both genera were mostly folivorous (leaf-eating) and did not have especially frugivorous (fruit-eating) tendencies because of the reduced proportions of rounded cusps. While both genera may have incorporated some fruit into their diets, the higher lingual tooth wear in Plagiolophus indicates it ate more fruit than Palaeotherium. Because of their likely tendencies to browse on higher plants, evident by their long necks and the woodland environments that they inhabited, it is unlikely that ground minerals, usually consumed from grazing on ground plants, significantly affected the tooth wear of either genus. The tooth wear in both genera could have been the result of scratches from chewing on fruit seeds. It is likely that Palaeotherium ate softer food such as younger leaves and fleshy fruit that may have had hard seeds while Plagiolophus leaned towards consuming tough food such as older leaves and harder fruit. Palaeotherium consuming more leaf and woody material and less fruit compared to Plagiolophus is supported by the two having somewhat different chewing functions from each other and Palaeotherium being high efficient in shearing food at lower energy.

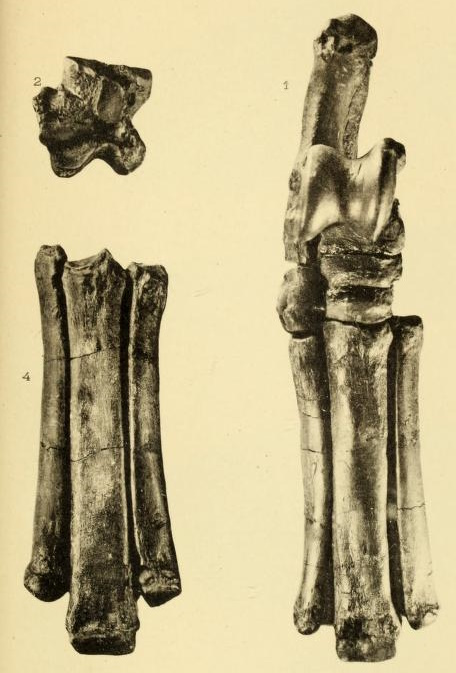
P. annectens front limb (bottom left) and hind limb (top left and right) bones. The stockier limb bones of P. annectens and some other species suggest less cursoriality compared to others like P. minor.

Remy in 2004 documented a hypsodonty trend in Plagiolophus, stating that it is not known in Palaeotherium but was also neither as rapid nor as dramatic a trend as in the hypsodonty observed in Leptolophus stehlini.^{134–35} Similarly, Perales-Gogenola et al. observed that the studied Plagiolophus species all have brachyodont dentitions, but they also noted a general trend in hypsodonty within the genus over time. More specifically, they pointed out that early species tended to be very brachyodont but that later species tended to have more hypsodont dentition, potentially reaching a hypsodonty level similar to that in the Miocene North American endemic grazing equid Merychippus. Leptolophus having a hypsodonty level similar to later Neogene equids suggests a distinct niche partitioning dietary strategy from contemporary palaeotheres, with Plagiolophus not showing a stricter preference towards abrasive plants based on dental evidence. Plagiolophus may have adopted dietary strategies similar to mixed-feeding deer such as the red deer (Cervus elephus) and roe deer (Capreolus capreolus) as well as the browsing-specialized moose (Alces alces), often avoiding hard foods (fruits, nuts, seeds, bark) and preferring tough leaves and related plant material. The changes in dietary behaviours in Plagiolophus were likely the result of environmental changes in western Europe during the late Eocene to early Oligocene.

Both Plagiolophus and the anoplotheriid Diplobune consumed increasingly abrasive plant material during the Eocene-Oligocene transition, but Diplobune was purely a folivorous browser and therefore never consumed fruits unlike Plagiolophus. The change in diet in P. minor is evident from dental morphology and scratches in several localities of different time ranges. In the Late Eocene French locality of La Débruge (MP18), the cheek dentition of P. minor has a high amount of scratches resulting from wear created from the infrequent consumption of fruits and seeds, although its main diet consisted mainly of tough leaves. Its larger consumption of fruit is evident by the lower amount of round cusps and the few pits recorded in the teeth (the presence of more pits than scratches indicates more folivorous diets). In a later Late Eocene German locality of Frohnstetten (MP20) in comparison, the cheek teeth of P. minor have similar amount of pits but has more rounded cusps and slightly less scratches, suggesting that it consumed less fruit and more abrasive leaves. In Soumailles and Ronzon, both French localities dating after the Grande Coupure extinction event (MP21), the cheek teeth of P. minor has more rounded cusps, smaller pits, and more pits than scratches. The dental evidence likely implies that P. minor became a specialized browser to the extent that fruit was nearly absent from its diet. P. minor was also probably a less selective browser in the more easily available old and tough leaves that took more effort to consume, but it probably avoided younger leaves and shoots. The less specialized browsing diet could have been due to seasonal availability of certain plants. There are no significant changes in dental wear in P. minor from the older Soumailles locality to the younger Ronzon locality.

== Palaeoecology ==
=== Middle Eocene ===
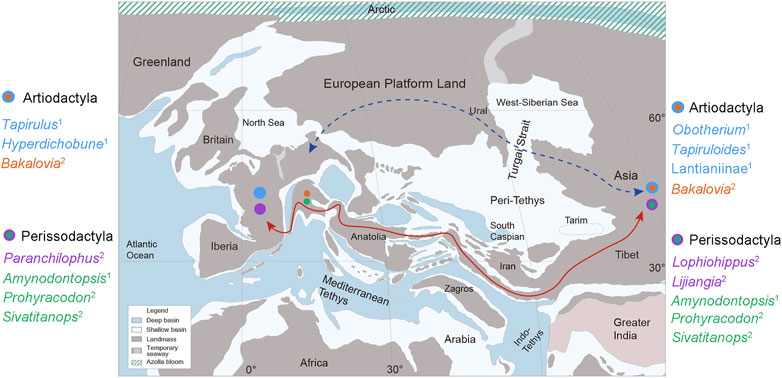
Palaeogeography of Europe and Asia during the middle Eocene with possible artiodactyl and perissodactyl dispersal routes

For much of the Eocene, a hothouse climate with humid, tropical environments with consistently high precipitations prevailed. Modern mammalian orders including the Perissodactyla, Artiodactyla, and Primates appeared already by the early Eocene, diversifying rapidly and developing dentitions specialized for folivory. The omnivorous forms mostly either switched to folivorous diets or went extinct by the middle Eocene (47–37 million years ago) along with the archaic "condylarths" (basal mammal groups). By the late Eocene (approx. 37–33 mya), most of the ungulate form dentitions shifted from bunodont (or rounded) cusps to cutting ridges (i.e. lophs) for folivorous diets.

Land connections between western Europe and North America were interrupted around 53 Ma. From the early Eocene up until the Grande Coupure extinction event (56–33.9 mya), western Eurasia was separated into three landmasses: western Europe (an archipelago), Balkanatolia (in-between the Paratethys Sea of the north and the Neotethys Ocean of the south), and eastern Eurasia. The Holarctic mammalian faunas of western Europe were therefore mostly isolated from other landmasses including Greenland, Africa, and eastern Eurasia, allowing for endemism to develop. Therefore, the European mammals of the late Eocene (MP17–MP20 of the Mammal Palaeogene zones) were mostly descendants of endemic middle Eocene groups.

In the fossil record, Plagiolophus is thought to have made its earliest appearance in MP12 based on dental fossils from the Geiseltal Unteren Mittelkohle locality in Germany that are classified as belonging to P. cartieri. The classification is typically only tentatively accepted by palaeontologists due to the poor differentiation between Plagiolophus and Propalaeotherium in terms of the lower molars.^{89} The earliest undisputed records of Plagiolophus are from the appearances of P. cartieri and P. casasecaensis in MP13 (the latter species of which is endemic to the Iberian peninsula and is restricted to the faunal unit).^{170} By then, it would have coexisted with perissodactyls (Palaeotheriidae, Lophiodontidae, and Hyrachyidae), non-endemic artiodactyls (Dichobunidae and Tapirulidae), endemic European artiodactyls (Choeropotamidae, Cebochoeridae, and Anoplotheriidae), and primates (Adapidae). Both the Amphimerycidae and Xiphodontidae made their first appearances by the level MP14. The stratigraphic ranges of the early species of Palaeotherium also overlapped with metatherians (Herpetotheriidae), cimolestans (Pantolestidae, Paroxyclaenidae), rodents (Ischyromyidae, Theridomyoidea, Gliridae), eulipotyphlans, bats, apatotherians, carnivoraformes (Miacidae), and hyaenodonts (Hyainailourinae, Proviverrinae). Other MP13-MP14 sites have also yielded fossils of turtles and crocodylomorphs, and MP13 sites are stratigraphically the latest to have yielded remains of the bird clades Gastornithidae and Palaeognathae.

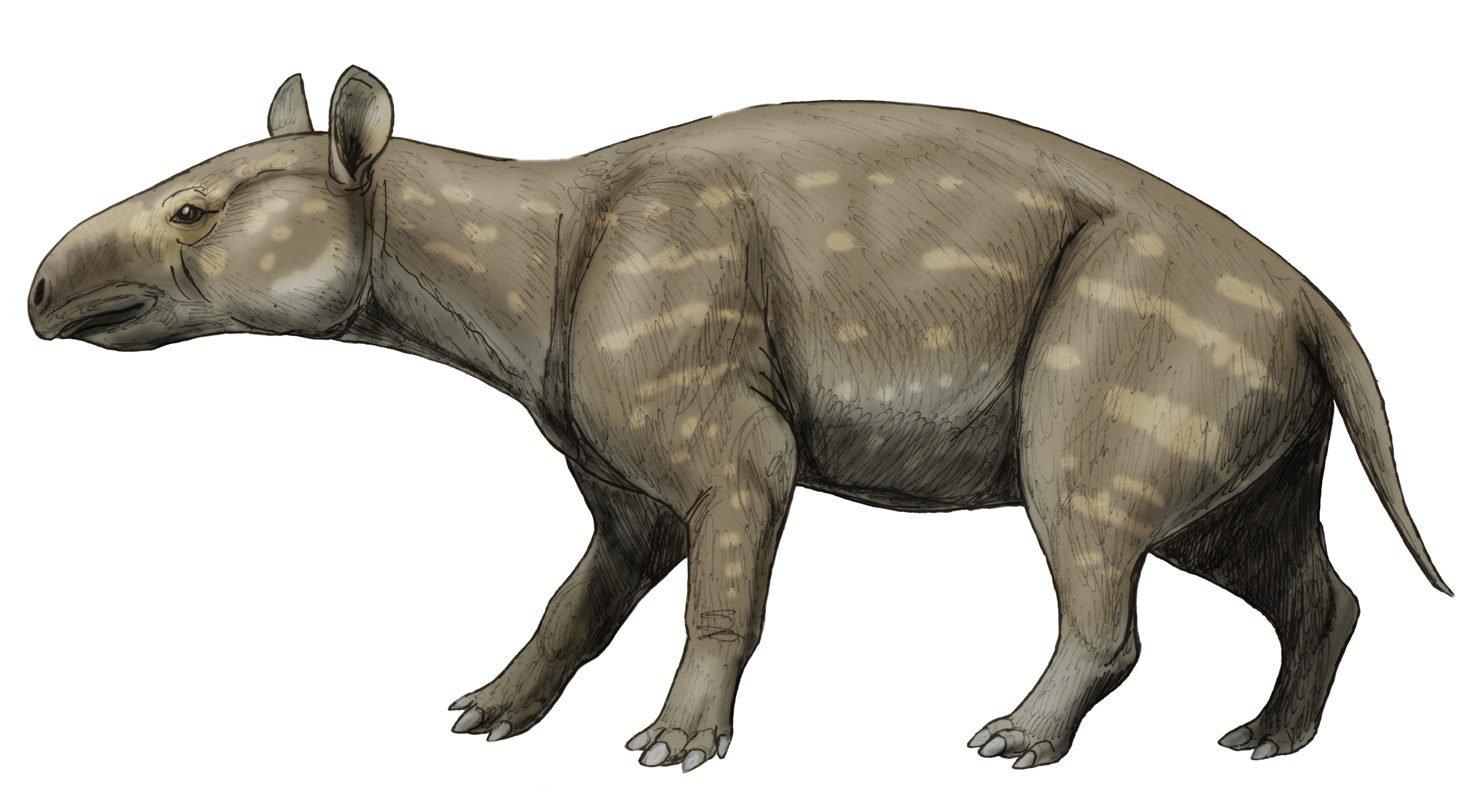
Restoration of Lophiodon, which coexisted with Plagiolophus in the middle to late Eocene

The Geiseltal Obere Mittelkhole locality, dating to MP13, records fossils of P. cartieri along with the herpetotheriid Amphiperatherium, carnivoraforme Quercygale, hyaenodont Proviverra, amphilemurid Amphilemur, archaeonycterid Matthesia, paroxyclaenid Pugiodens, adapid Europolemur, omomyid Nannopithex, dichobunid Messelobunodon, choeropotamids Rhagatherium and Amphirhagatherium, lophiodonts Lophiodon and Paralophiodon, and the other palaeotheres Propalaeotherium and Lophiotherium.

The MP14 faunal unit marks the only known period in which P. lugdunensis appears and also records the final temporal appearance of P. cartieri. MP16 marks the first appearances of the species P. cartailhaci, P. curtisi, P. mamertensis, P. annectens, and P. mazateronensis, the former three of which were exclusive to this faunal unit. P. curtisi is known only from the UK, and P. mazateronensis was one of several palaeothere species endemic to the Iberian Peninsula. By the middle Eocene, Plagiolophus lived across western Europe in what is now Spain, the UK, France, Germany, and Switzerland.^{78, 88, 92, 94, 101, 107, 109} Despite being almost entirely recorded from western Europe, Plagiolophus sp. (species of unclear affinity) is recorded from an eastern European locality in Cherno More in Bulgaria, dating to the middle to late Eocene. The sporadic occurrences of Palaeotherium and Plagiolophus suggest some periodic connectivity between Balkanatolia and other Eurasian regions, allowing faunas to disperse between land.

P. annectens, P. cartailhaci, and P. mamertensis are located in the MP16 French locality of Robiac along with the herpetotheriids Amphiperatherium and Peratherium, apatemyid Heterohyus, nyctithere Saturninia, omomyids (Necrolemur, Pseudoloris, and Microchoerus), adapid Adapis, ischyromyid Ailuravus, glirid Glamys, pseudosciurid Sciuroides, theridomyids Elfomys and Pseudoltinomys, hyaenodonts (Paracynohyaenodon, Paroxyaena, and Cynohyaenodon), carnivoraformes (Simamphicyon, Quercygale, and Paramiacis), cebochoerids Cebochoerus and Acotherulum, choeropotamids Choeropotamus and Haplobunodon, tapirulid Tapirulus, anoplotheriids (Dacrytherium, Catodontherium, and Robiatherium, dichobunid Mouillacitherium, robiacinid Robiacina, xiphodonts (Xiphodon, Dichodon, Haplomeryx), amphimerycid Pseudamphimeryx, lophiodont Lophiodon, hyrachyid Chasmotherium, and other palaeotheres (Palaeotherium, Leptolophus, Anchilophus, Metanchilophus, Lophiotherium, Pachynolophus, Eurohippus).

After MP16, a faunal turnover occurred, marking the disappearances of the lophiodonts and European hyrachyids as well as the extinctions of all European crocodylomorphs except for the alligatoroid Diplocynodon. The causes of the faunal turnover have been attributed to a shift from humid and highly tropical environments to drier and more temperate forests with open areas and more abrasive vegetation. The surviving herbivorous faunas shifted their dentitions and dietary strategies accordingly to adapt to abrasive and seasonal vegetation. The environments were still subhumid and full of subtropical evergreen forests, however. The Palaeotheriidae was the sole remaining European perissodactyl group, and frugivorous-folivorous or purely folivorous artiodactyls became the dominant group in western Europe.

=== Late Eocene ===
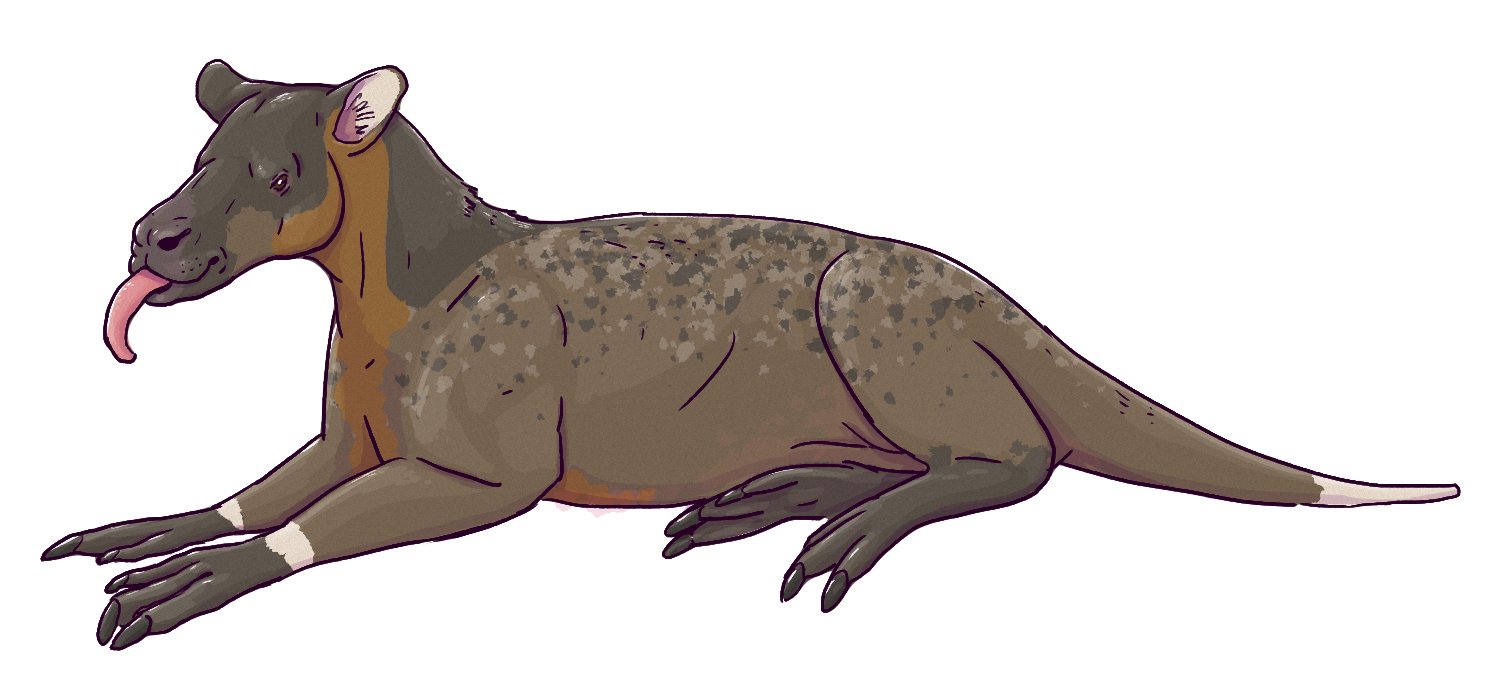
Restoration of Diplobune, a contemporary mammal that was endemic to western Europe

The Late Eocene marks the latest appearances of P. annectens and P. mazateronensis at MP17 followed by the first appearances of P. oweni and P. minor at MP18 (the former of which is restricted to the unit). MP20 records both the continuous occurrence of P. minor and the restricted appearances of P. fraasi and P. major.^{34, 78, 98, 107, 113, 118} Within the late Eocene, the Cainotheriidae and derived members of the Anoplotheriinae both made their first fossil record appearances by MP18. Also, several migrant mammal groups had reached western Europe by MP17a-MP18, namely the Anthracotheriidae, Hyaenodontinae, and Amphicyonidae. In addition to snakes, frogs, and salamandrids, rich assemblage of lizards are known in western Europe as well from MP16-MP20, representing the Iguanidae, Lacertidae, Gekkonidae, Agamidae, Scincidae, Helodermatidae, and Varanoidea, most of which were able to thrive in the warm temperatures of western Europe.

The MP18 locality of La Débruge in France holds fossil records of both P. oweni and P. minor along with the herpetotheriid Peratherium, theridomyids Blainvillimys and Theridomys, ischyromyid Plesiarctomys, glirid Glamys, hyaenodonts Hyaenodon and Pterodon, amphicyonid Cynodictis, palaeotheres Palaeotherium and Anchilophus, dichobunid Dichobune, choeropotamid Choeropotamus, cebochoerids Cebochoerus and Acotherulum, anoplotheriids (Anoplotherium, Diplobune, and Dacrytherium), tapirulid Tapirulus, xiphodonts Xiphodon and Dichodon, cainothere Oxacron, amphimerycid Amphimeryx, and the anthracothere Elomeryx.

=== Grande Coupure ===
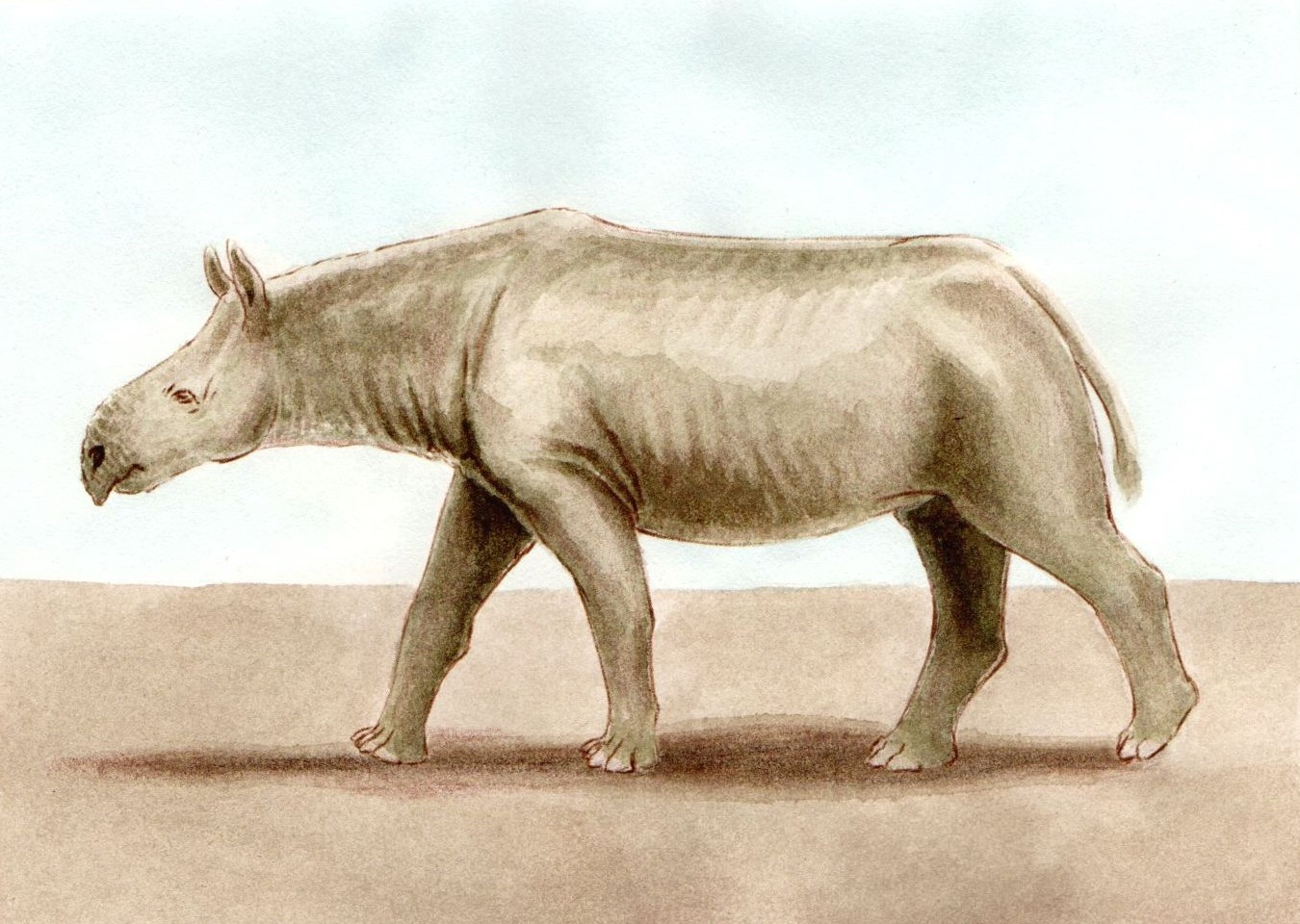
Restoration of Ronzotherium, a rhinocerotid genus that arrived in western Europe by the Grande Coupure

The Grande Coupure event of western Europe is well recognized in the palaeontological record as one of the largest extinction and faunal turnover events in the Cenozoic era. The event is coincident with climate forcing events of cooler and more seasonal climates, the result being a 60% extinction rate of western European mammalian lineages while Asian faunal immigrants replaced them. The Grande Coupure is often marked by palaeontologists as part of the Eocene-Oligocene boundary as a result at 33.9 Ma, although some estimate that the event began 33.6–33.4 Ma. The event correlates directly with or after the Eocene-Oligocene transition, an abrupt shift from a greenhouse world characterizing much of the Palaeogene to a coolhouse/icehouse world of the early Oligocene onwards. The massive drop in temperatures stemmed from the first major expansion of the Antarctic ice sheets that caused drastic pCO_{2} decreases and an estimated drop of ~70 m (230 ft) in sea level.

The seaway dynamics separating western Europe from other landmasses by strong extents but allowing for some levels of dispersals prior to the Grande Coupure are complicated and contentious, but many palaeontologists agreed that glaciation and the resulting drops in sea level played major roles in the drying of the seaways previously acting as major barriers to eastern migrants from Balkanatolia and western Europe. The Turgai Strait is often proposed as the main European seaway barrier prior to the Grande Coupure, but some researchers challenged this perception recently, arguing that it completely receded already 37 Ma, long before the Eocene-Oligocene transition. Alexis Licht et al. in 2022 suggested that the Grande Coupure could have possibly been synchronous with the Oi-1 glaciation (33.5 Ma), which records a decline in atmospheric CO_{2}, boosting the Antarctic glaciation that already started by the Eocene-Oligocene transition. The Oi-1 glaciation, similar to the first glaciation event, caused large drops in sea level and pushed the global climate towards a coolhouse/icehouse environment. The extinctions of a majority of endemic artiodactyls have been attributed to competition with immigrant faunas, environmental changes from cooling climates, or some combination of the two.

The earliest Oligocene marked the arrivals of later anthracotheres, entelodonts, ruminants (Gelocidae, Lophiomerycidae), rhinocerotoids (Rhinocerotidae, Amynodontidae, Eggysodontidae), carnivorans (later Amphicyonidae, Amphicynodontidae, Nimravidae, and Ursidae), eastern Eurasian rodents (Eomyidae, Cricetidae, and Castoridae), and eulipotyphlans (Erinaceidae).

In regard to palaeotheres, P. major and P. fraasi are recorded to have gone extinct by MP20 while P. minor survived past the Grande Coupure. Research by Sarah C. Joomun et al. in 2010 suggests that P. minor changed its dietary habits most likely in response to increasingly abrasive plants, the result of environmental changes following the Oi-1 glaciation. Afterward, the climate in MP21 was stable enough that P. minor did not need to respond with further dietary changes. The climatic trends from the Grande Coupure event favoured palaeothere species that had light body builds and were built for cursoriality such as P. minor, allowing them to transverse across more open lands and escape from newly arrived predators where shelter otherwise was scarce. P. fraasi in comparison had a stockier build,^{167–168} a body build type that was likely unfavourable for early Oligocene environmental trends in relation to palaeotheres.

In contrast to earlier faunal units, Plagiolophus in MP21 localities such as in Soumailles coexisted with both pre-Grande Coupure and immigrant faunas. P. minor was found in Soumailles along with the theridomyids Blainvillimys and Theridomys, nimravid Eusmilus, entelodont Entelodon, cebochoerid Acotherulum, eggysodont Eggysodon, and the palaeothere Palaeotherium.

=== Early Oligocene ===
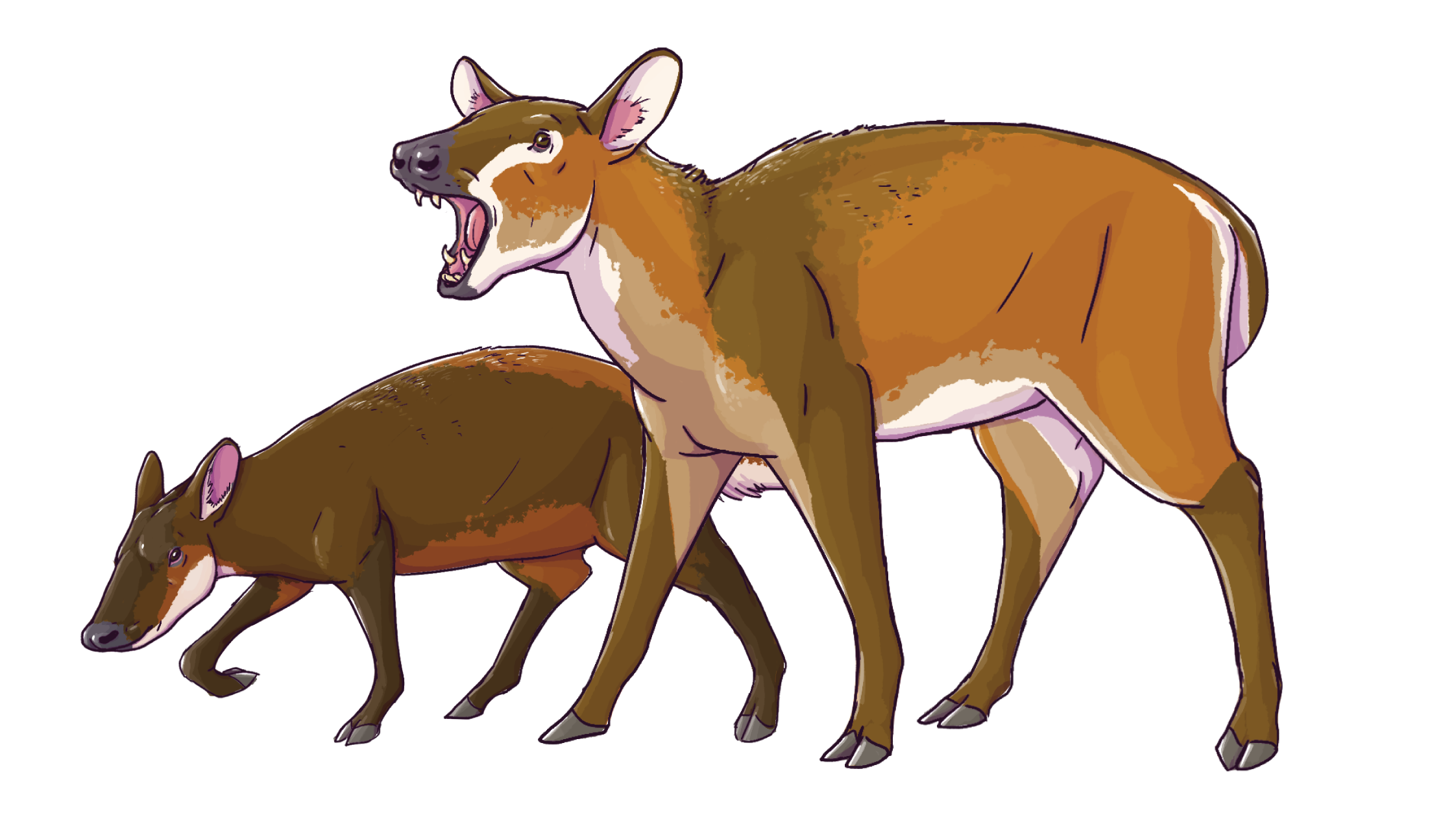
Restoration of Bachitherium, a namesake arrival of the Bachitherium Dispersal Event

Although the Eocene-Oligocene transition marked long-term drastic cooling global climates, western Eurasia was still dominated by humid climates, albeit with dry winter seasons in the Oligocene. Europe during the Oligocene had environments largely adapted to winter-dry seasons and humid seasons that were composed of three separate vegetational belts by latitude, with temperate needleleaf-broadleaved or purely broadleaved deciduous forests aligning with the northernmost belt between 40°N and 50°N, the middle belt of warmth-adapted mixed mesophytic and evergreen broadleaved forests aligning between 40°N and 30°N, and the last belt containing tropical vegetation aligning below 30°N.

In the early Oligocene after MP21, Plagiolophus was the sole remaining palaeothere genus present in Europe. P. minor is last recorded in MP22, but several other species are known to have originated during or after the Grande Coupure event. MP21 records the restricted temporal appearances of P. ovinus and P. ringeadei. Subsequent units contain one unique species of Plagiolophus: P. ministri in MP22, P. huerzeleri in MP23, and P. javali in MP25.^{34, 59, 60, 66, 71, 74} Several major faunal events occurred in the early Oligocene of Europe, namely the Bachitherium Dispersal Event in MP23 and a major faunal turnover event at MP24.

In the MP25 French locality of Le Garouillas, the last surviving palaeothere species P. javali (the largest species of Plagiolophus) coexisted with the likes of the herpetotheriids Amphiperatherium and Peratherium, nyctithere Darbonetus, talpid Myxomygale, erinaceid Tetracus, bats (Vespertiliavus, Vaylatsia, Stehlinia), theridomyids (Blainvillimys, Issiodoromys, Theridomys), cricetid Eucricetodon, glirid Gliravus, nimravids (Quercylurus, Nimravus, Dinailurictis), amynodont Cadurcotherium, chalicothere Schizotherium, suoid Doliochoerus, dichobunid Metriotherium, cainotheres Plesiomeryx and Cainomeryx, lophiomerycid Lophiomeryx, and the bachithere Bachitherium.^{74} MP25 corresponds to a period of high aridity in western Europe.
