= Desiderio Esparza =

Spanish footballer (1905–1979)

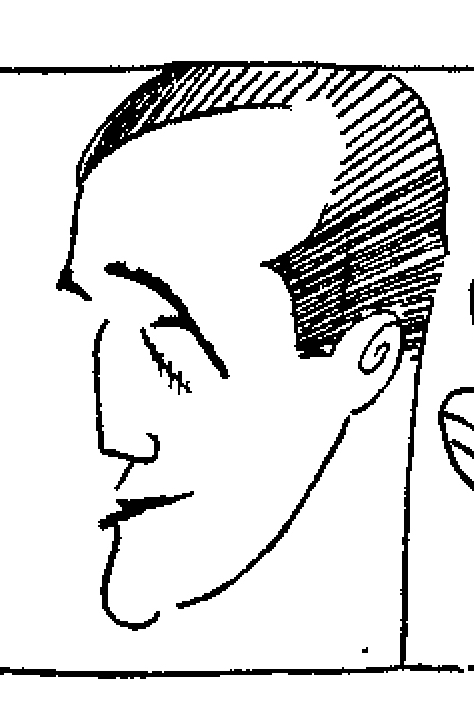
- Caricature of Esparza from 29 February 1928

Personal information
- Full name: Desiderio Esparza Echauri
- Date of birth: 11 February 1905
- Place of birth: Mues, Navarre, Spain
- Date of death: 14 January 1979 (aged 73)
- Place of death: unknown
- Position: Midfielder

Senior career*
Years	Team	Apps	(Gls)
1927–1932	Real Madrid	51	(1)

International career
1928	Spain	0	(0)
- * Club domestic league appearances and goals

Desiderio Esparza Echauri (11 February 1905 – 14 January 1979) was a Spanish footballer who played as a midfielder for Real Madrid between 1927 and 1932. Esparza was also a member of the Spanish squad that competed in the football tournament of the 1928 Olympic Games in Amsterdam, but he did not play in any matches.

== Biography ==
Born in Mues, Navarre, Esparza moved to Madrid in the 1920s for unknown reasons, and there, he joined the ranks of Real Madrid in 1927, aged 22. On 10 February, he was one of the eleven footballers who played in Real's first-ever match in the Spanish top division, helping his side to a 5–0 win over CE Europa.

Together with the likes of Félix Quesada, José María Peña, Jaime Lazcano, and Gaspar Rubio, he was a member of the Madrid squad that reached back-to-back finals in the Copa del Rey in 1929 and 1930, both of which ending in losses to RCD Espanyol (2–1) and Athletic Bilbao (3–2). In the 1931 Copa del Rey, Madrid was knocked out in the quarter-finals by Real Betis; Esparza started in the first leg on 24 May, in which he injured Betis' Enrique Soladrero after tackling him with a high foot at the end of the game, but even though Betis was forced to play with 10 men, Madrid had already conceded three goals in the first half and lost 3–0.

In the 1931–32 season, Esparza played five league matches as Madrid won its first-ever La Liga title, finishing the league unbeaten. In total, he scored 3 goals in 117 official matches for Madrid, including 1 goal in 51 La Liga matches, 2 goals in 38 cup matches, and 28 in the regional championship.

In 1952, Esparza gave his testimony to El Libro de Oro del Real Madrid (the Golden Book of Real Madrid), which describes the first 50 years of the club through the words of its players, coaches, and presidents; he stated that "during the six years that I have been a member of this club as a football player, its behaviour towards me has been such that I doubt that anyone else can surpass it in generosity".

Esparza died on 14 January 1979, at the age of 73.

== Honours ==
Madrid FC

- La Liga: 1931–32
- Copa del Rey runner-up: 1929, 1930
- Campeonato Regional Centro: 1929–30, 1930–31, 1931–32

== See also ==
- List of Real Madrid CF players
