= 1930 Copa del Rey final =

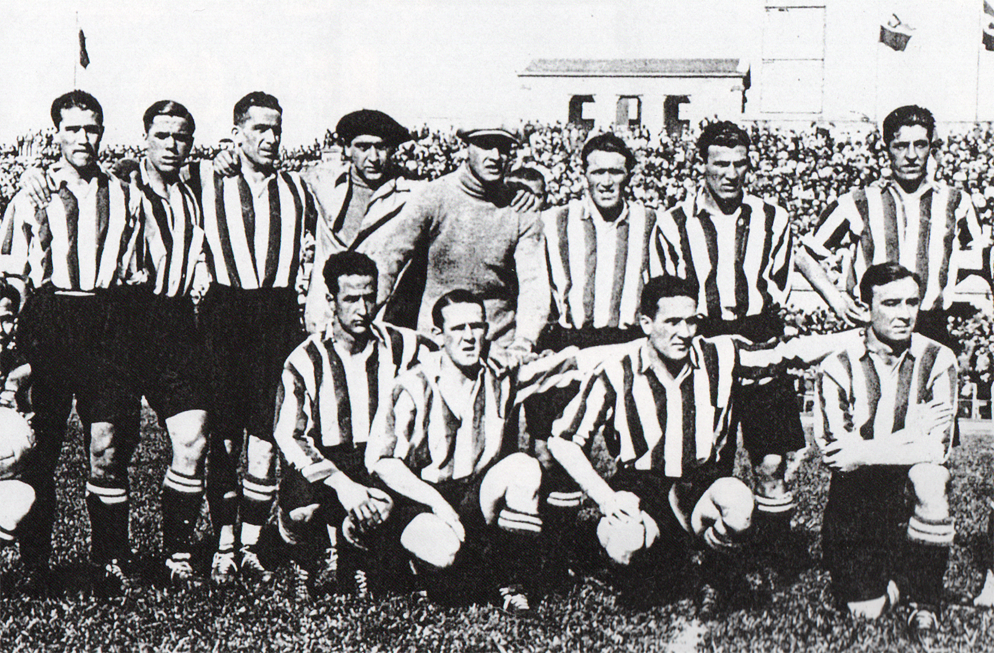
- Athletic Club, champions
- Event: 1930 Copa del Rey
| Athletic Bilbao | Real Madrid |
| 3 | 2 |
- After extra time
- Date: 1 June 1930
- Venue: Montjuïch, Barcelona
- Referee: Guillermo Comorera
- Attendance: 63,000

The 1930 Copa del Rey final was the 30th final of the Copa del Rey, the Spanish football cup competition. Athletic Bilbao beat Real Madrid 3–2 and won their tenth title.

== Match details ==
1 June 1930
16:30 CET

| Athletic Bilbao | 3–2 (a.e.t.) | Real Madrid |
|---|---|---|
| Unamuno 1'; Iraragorri 45'; Lafuente 115' | | 15' Lazcano; 65' Triana |

Montjuïch, Barcelona
Attendance: 63,000
Referee: Guillermo Comorera

| Athletic Bilbao | Real Madrid |

| GK | 1 | (Spain) Gregorio Blasco |
| DF | 2 | (Spain) José María Castellanos |
| DF | 3 | (Spain) Juan Urquizu |
| MF | 4 | (Spain) Juan Garizurieta |
| MF | 5 | (Spain) José Muguerza |
| MF | 6 | (Spain) Chirri II | (red card) 117' |
| FW | 7 | (Spain) Lafuente |
| FW | 8 | (Spain) José Iraragorri |
| FW | 9 | (Spain) Víctor Unamuno |
| FW | 10 | (Spain) Bata |
| FW | 11 | (Spain) Guillermo Gorostiza |
Manager:
(England) Fred Pentland

| GK | 1 | (Spain) Rafael Vidal |
| DF | 2 | (Spain) José Torregrosa |
| DF | 3 | (Spain) Félix Quesada |
| MF | 4 | (Spain) Pachuco Prats | (red card) 117' |
| MF | 5 | (Spain) Desiderio Esparza |
| MF | 6 | (Spain) José María Peña |
| FW | 7 | (Spain) Jaime Lazcano |
| FW | 8 | (Spain) Monchín Triana |
| FW | 9 | (Spain) Gaspar Rubio |
| FW | 10 | (Spain) Cosme Vázquez |
| FW | 11 | (Spain) Luis Olaso |
Manager:
(Hungary) Lippo Hertzka

Copa del Rey 1930 winners
Athletic Bilbao
10th title

== See also ==
- El Viejo Clásico
