= Casaseca de Campeán =

Coordinates: 41°22′N 5°45′W

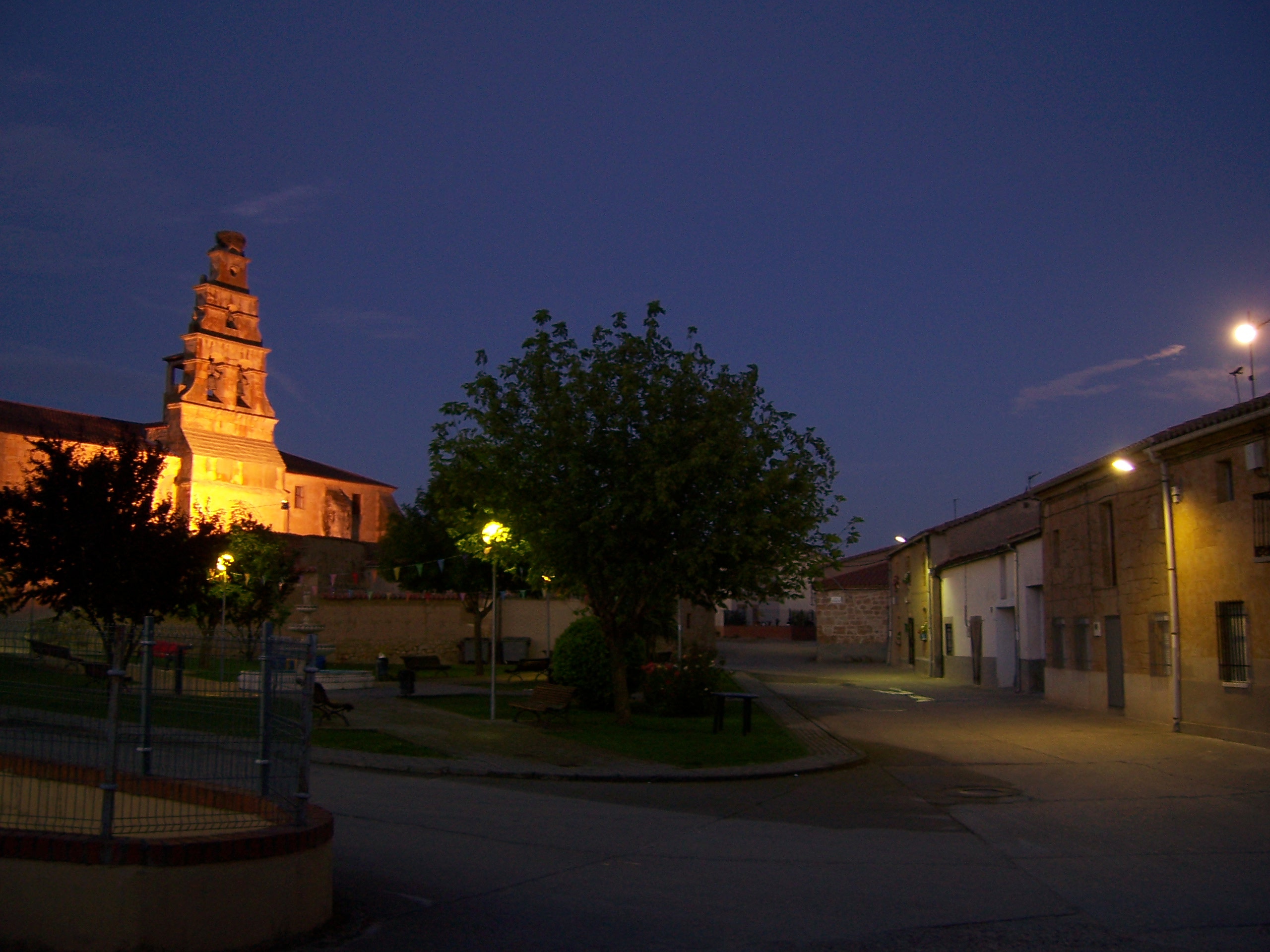
- Interactive map of Casaseca de Campeán
- Country: Spain
- Autonomous community: Castile and León
- Province: Zamora
- Municipality: Casaseca de Campeán

Area
  - Total: 11 km^{2} (4.2 sq mi)

Population (2025-01-01)
  - Total: 88
  - Density: 8.0/km^{2} (21/sq mi)
- Time zone: UTC+1 (CET)
  - Summer (DST): UTC+2 (CEST)
- Website: www.casaseca.es

Casaseca de Campeán is a municipality located in the province of Zamora, Castile and León, Spain. According to the 2009 census (INE), the municipality has a population of 121 inhabitants.
