= Mues =

Town in Navarre, Spain

Coordinates: 42°36′22″N 2°13′35″W

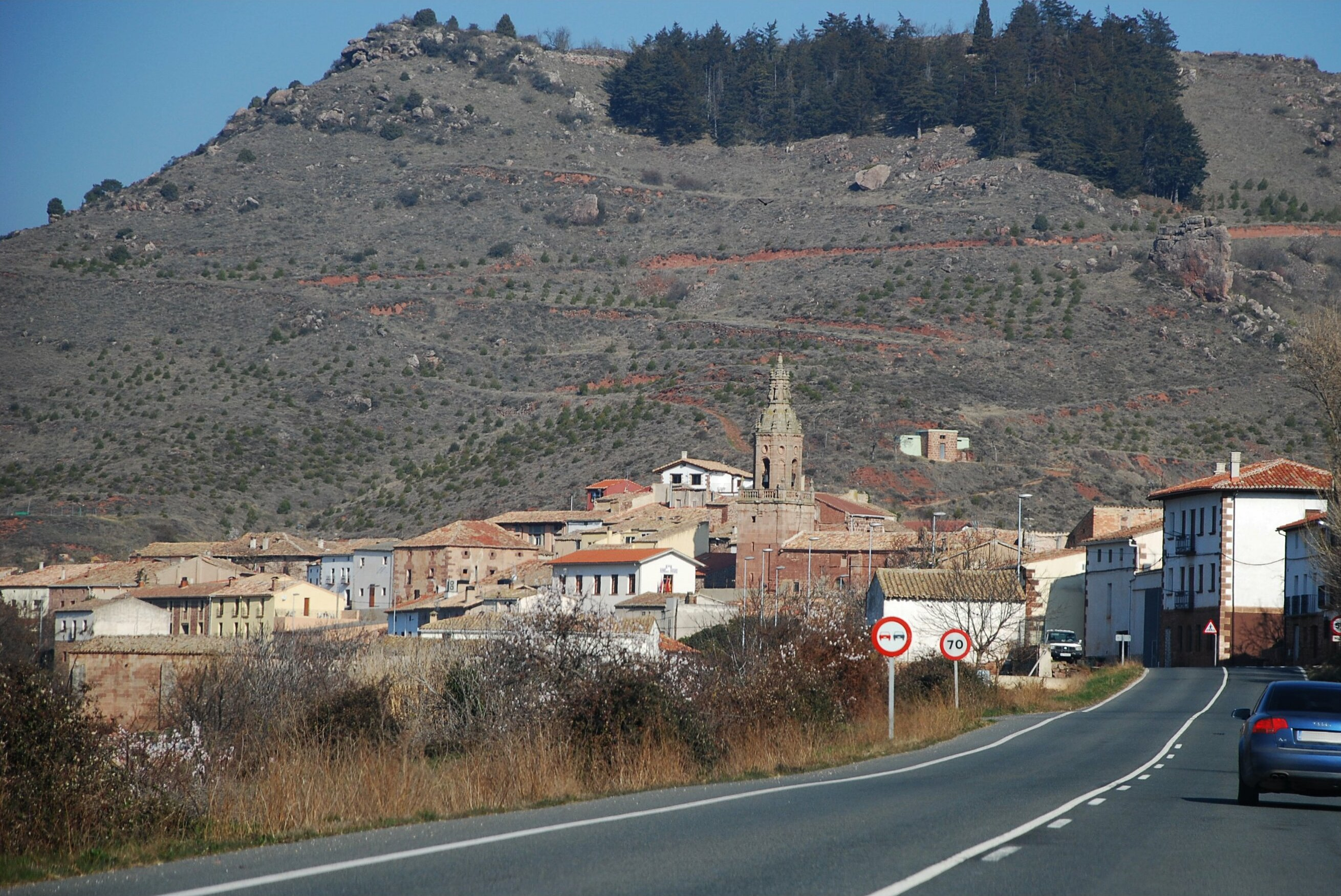

Mues is a town and municipality located in the province and autonomous community of Navarre, northern Spain.
