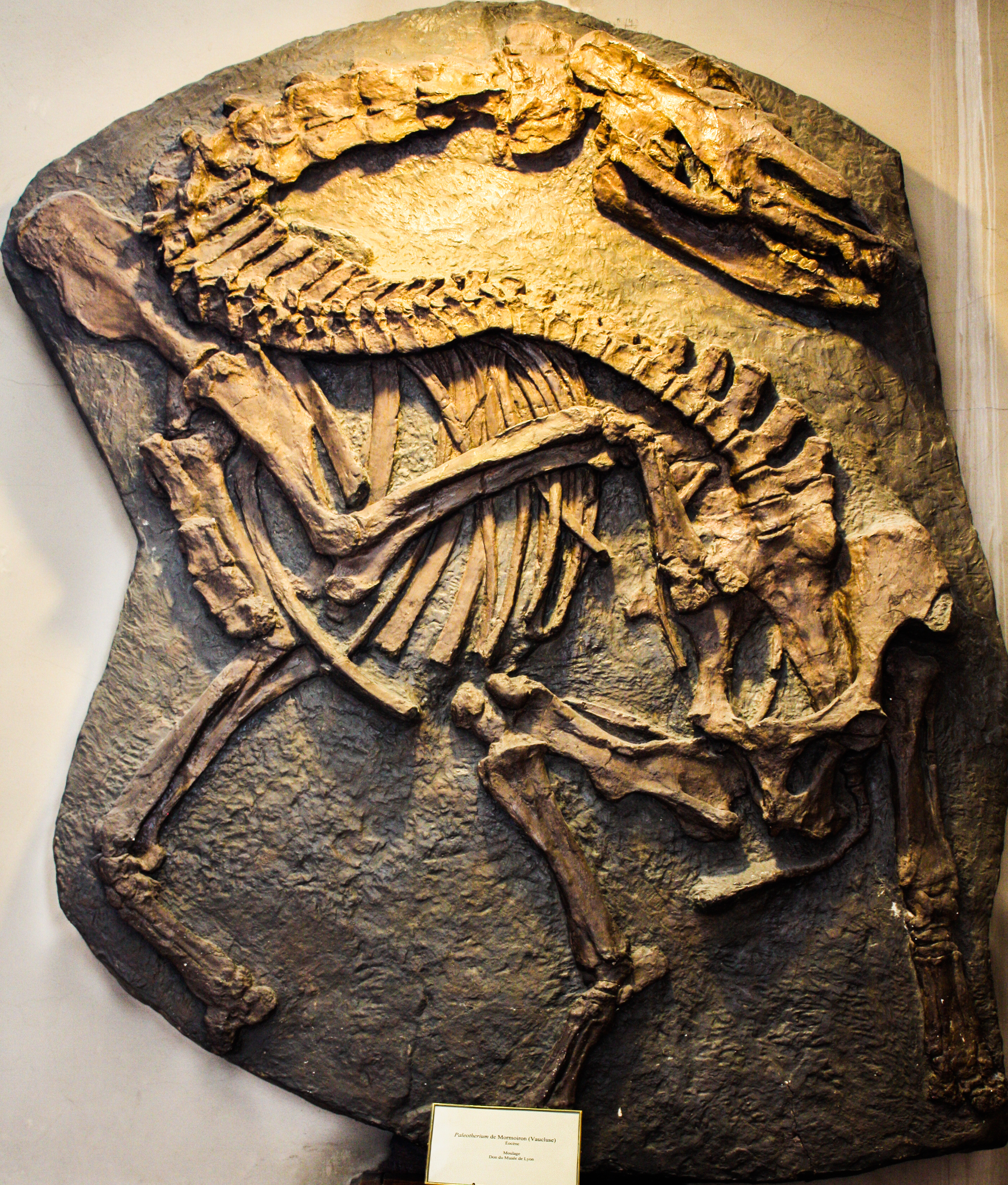
- Palaeotherium magnum cast skeleton from the French commune of Mormoiron, National Museum of Natural History, France

Scientific classification
- Kingdom: Animalia
- Phylum: Chordata
- Class: Mammalia
- Order: Perissodactyla
- Family: †Palaeotheriidae
- Subfamily: †Palaeotheriinae
- Genus: †Palaeotherium; Cuvier, 1804

Type species
- †Palaeotherium magnum Cuvier, 1804

Other species
- †P. medium Cuvier, 1804; †P. crassum Cuvier, 1805; †P. curtum Cuvier, 1812; †P. duvali Pomel, 1853; †P. castrense Noulet, 1863; †P. siderolithicum Pictet & Humbert, 1869; †P. eocaenum Gervais, 1875; †P. lautricense Stehlin, 1904; †P. muehlbergi Stehlin, 1904; †P. renevieri Stehlin, 1904; †P. ruetimeyeri Stehlin, 1904; †P. pomeli Franzen, 1968; †P. crusafonti Casanovas-Cladellas, 1975; †P. llamaquiquense Casanovas-Cladellas & Santafé Llopis, 1991; †P. giganteum Cuesta, 1993; For subspecies suggested, see below.

Synonyms
- Genus synonymy: Paleotherium Cuvier, 1804; Paloeotherium Cuvier, 1804; Palaetherium Rafinesque, 1814; Paloetherium Rafinesque, 1814; Salaeotherium Roulin, 1829; Palacotherium von Meyer, 1838; Synonyms of P. magnum: Palaeotherium girondicum Blainville, 1846; Palaeotherium aniciense Gervais, 1848–1852; Palaeotherium subgracile Aymard, 1853; Palaeotherium magnum parisiense Gervais, 1859; Palaeotherium stehlini Depéret, 1917; Palaeotherium franzeni Casanovas-Cladellas & Santafé Llopis, 1980; Synonyms of P. medium: Palaeotherium brivatense Bravard, 1843; Palaeotherium suevicum Fraas, 1869; Palaeotherium möschi Stehlin, 1904; Palaeotherium euzetense Depéret, 1917; Synonyms of P. crassum: Palaeotherium indeterminatum Cuvier, 1822; Synonyms of P. curtum: Palaeotherium latum Cuvier, 1822; Palaeotherium buseri Stehlin, 1904; Synonyms of P. duvali: Palaeotherium heimi Stehlin, 1904; Palaeotherium kleini Dietrich, 1922; Synonyms of P. castrense: Paloplotherium magnum Ruetimeyer, 1891; Synonyms of P. siderolithicum: Plagiolophus siderolithicus Pictet & Humbert, 1869; Synonyms of P. eocaenum: Paloplotherium depereti Stehlin, 1902; Synonyms of P. muehlbergi: Palaeotherium velaunum Blainville, 1848; Dubious species: Palaeotherium gracile von Meyer, 1839; Palaeotherium parvulum de Serres, 1844; Palaeotherium commune Blainville, 1846; Palaeotherium primaevum Aymard, 1853; Palaeotherium gervaisii Aymard, 1853

= Palaeotherium =

Palaeotherium Temporal range: Middle Eocene – Early Oligocene 43.5–32.5 Ma

Extinct genus of mammals

Palaeotherium is an extinct genus of equoid that lived in Europe and possibly the Middle East from the Middle Eocene to the Early Oligocene. It is the type genus of the Palaeotheriidae, a group exclusive to the Palaeogene that was closest in relation to the Equidae, which contains horses plus their closest relatives and ancestors. Fossils of Palaeotherium were first described in 1782 by the French naturalist Robert de Lamanon and then closely studied by another French naturalist, Georges Cuvier, after 1798. Cuvier erected the genus in 1804 and recognized multiple species based on overall fossil sizes and forms. As one of the first fossil genera to be recognized with official taxonomic authority, it is recognized as an important milestone within the field of palaeontology. The research by early naturalists on Palaeotherium contributed to the developing ideas of evolution, extinction, and succession and demonstrating the morphological diversity of different species within one genus.

Since Cuvier's descriptions, many other naturalists from Europe and the Americas recognized many species of Palaeotherium, some valid, some reclassified to different genera afterward, and others being eventually rendered invalid. The German palaeontologist Jens Lorenz Franzen modernized its taxonomy due to his recognition of many subspecies as part of his dissertation in 1968, which were subsequently accepted by other palaeontologists. Today, there are sixteen known species recognized, many of which have multiple subspecies. In 1992, the French palaeontologist Jean-Albert Remy recognized two subgenera that most species are classified to based on cranial anatomies: the specialized Palaeotherium and the more generalized Franzenitherium.

Palaeotherium is an evolutionarily derived member of its family with tridactyl (or three-toed) forelimbs and hindlimbs, small post-canine diastemata (gaps between teeth), and premolars that are usually developed into molar-like forms. It shares many similar anatomical traits with other perissodactyls and has a large diversity in anatomical traits by species, with some species like P. magnum, P. curtum, and P. crassum being stockier in build and P. medium being more cursorial (or adapted for running). The genus ranges in size from the small species P. lautricense, with an estimated weight of 36 kg (79 lb), to the massive P. giganteum, thought to have been capable of weighing over 700 kg (1,500 lb). P. magnum, known by two mostly complete skeletons from France, could have reached approximately 1.3 m (4 ft 3 in) in shoulder height and 2.52 m (8 ft 3 in) in length. The large-sized species were therefore amongst the largest mammals in the Eocene of Europe. Palaeotherium may have lived in herds and, as demonstrated by its dentition, was able to actively niche partition with another palaeothere Plagiolophus by specializing on softer leaves and fruit, although both were mostly leaf-eating.

Palaeotherium and other genera of the subfamily Palaeotheriinae likely descended from the earlier subfamily Pachynolophinae, which lived in both Europe and Asia as opposed to North America unlike undisputed members of the Equidae. By the time that the first species P. eocaenum appeared in the middle Eocene, western Europe was an archipelago that was isolated from the rest of Eurasia, meaning that it and subsequent species lived in an environment with various other faunas that also evolved with strong levels of endemism. The Iberian Peninsula had its own level of endemism with several species that are only known within the region, although they were replaced by more widespread species from central Europe by the late Eocene. Within both the middle and late Eocene, Palaeotherium consistently maintained a high species diversity and endured major environmental changes leading to a faunal turnover that occurred by the beginning of the late Eocene.

By the early Oligocene, most of its species went extinct along with many genera of western European mammals as part of the Grande Coupure extinction and faunal turnover event, the causes of the extinctions being attributed mainly to environmental changes from increased glaciation and seasonality, negative interactions with immigrant faunas from Asia (competition and/or predation), or some combination of the two. P. medium survived past the Grande Coupure probably due to its cursorial nature that allowed it to travel across open lands more efficiently and escape immigrant carnivores; it was the last species of its genus and went extinct not long after the faunal turnover event.

== Taxonomy ==
=== Research history ===
==== First descriptions ====
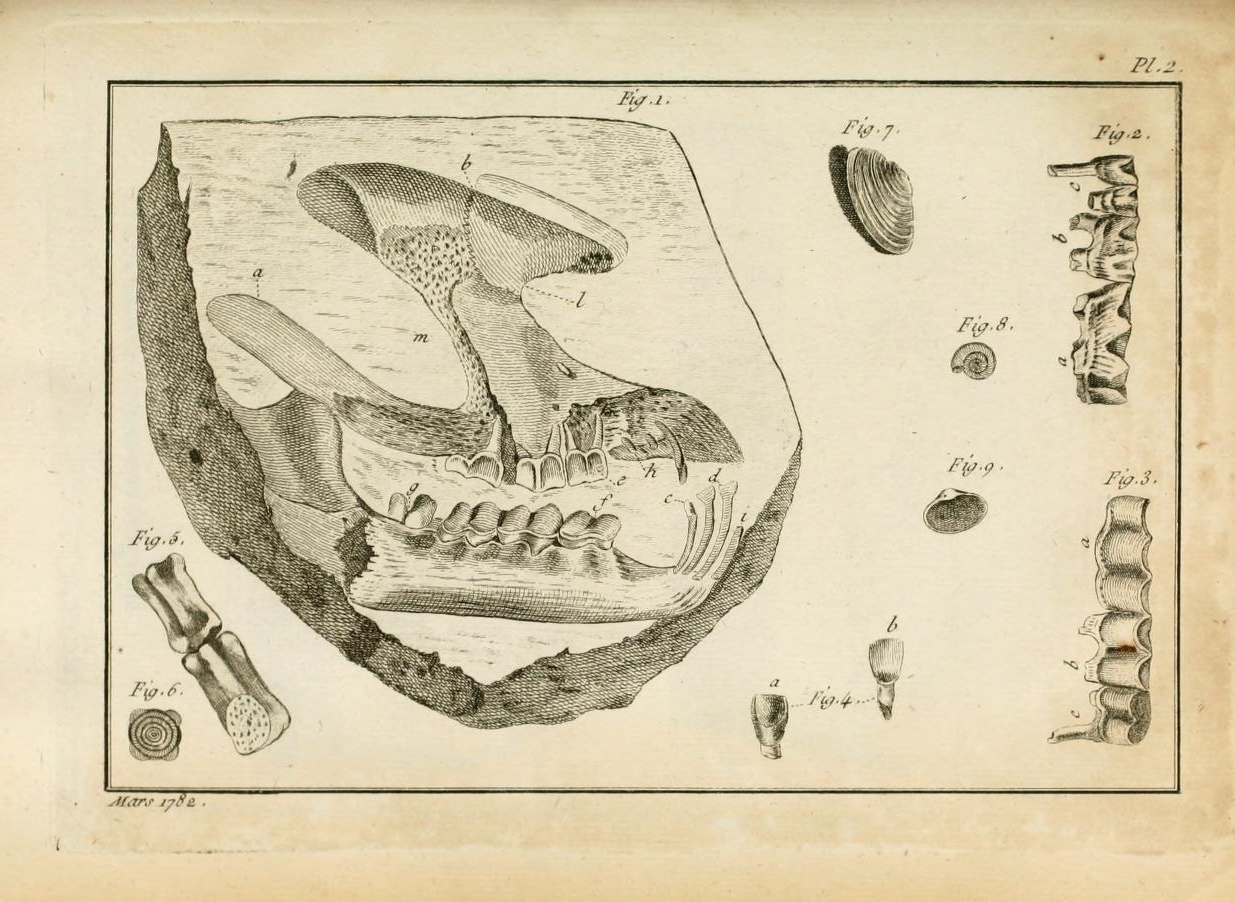
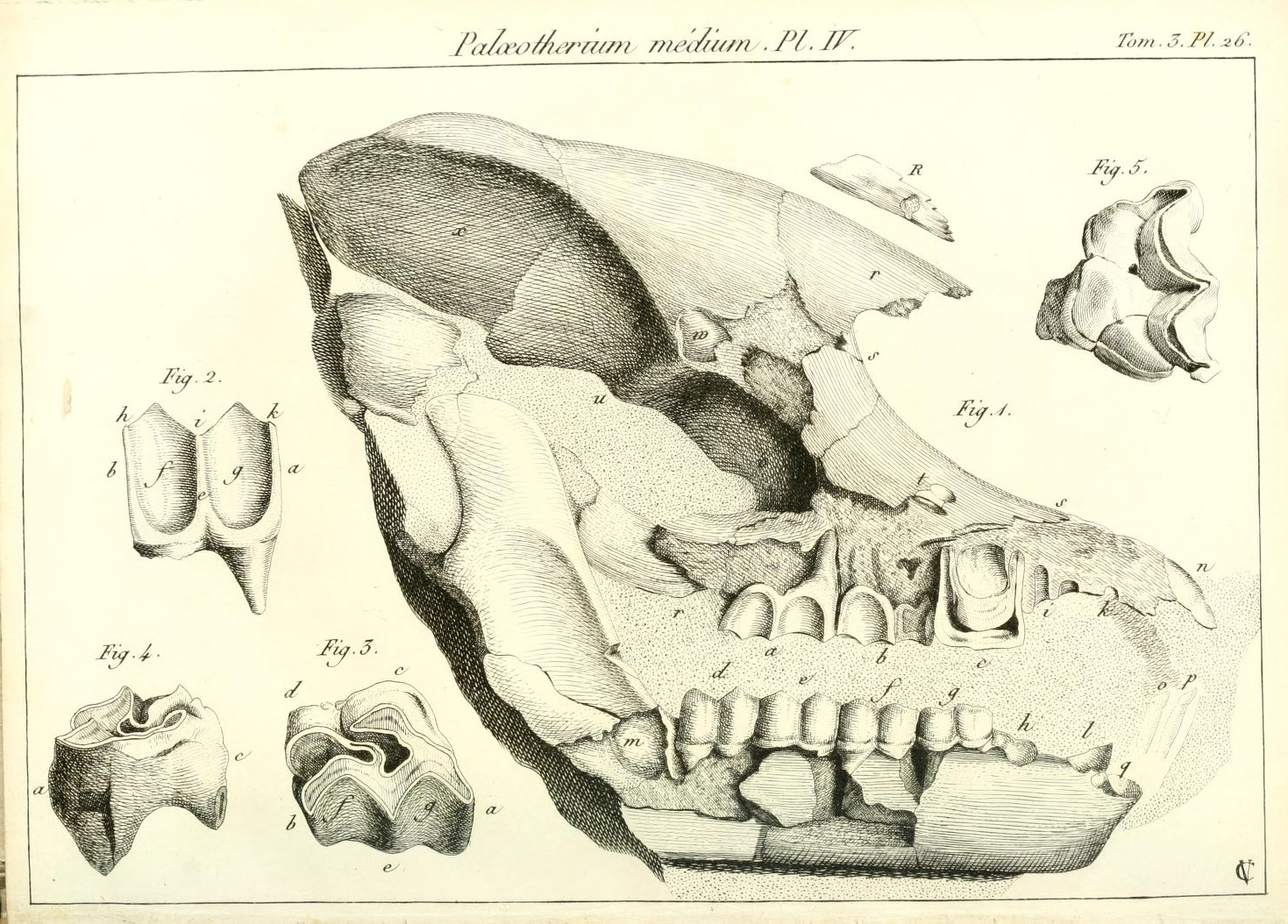
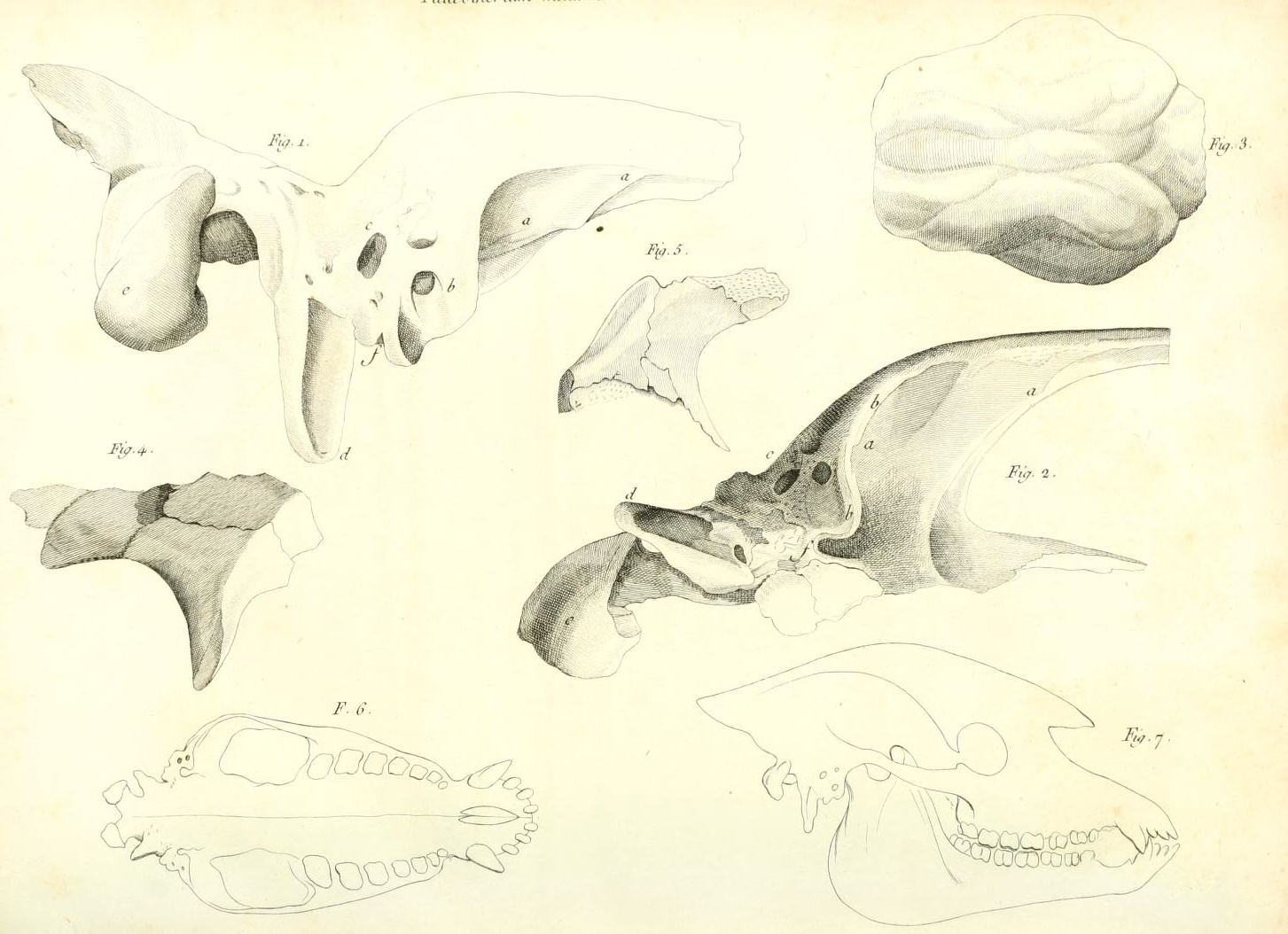
1782 illustration of the fossil skull of Palaeotherium medium (left) and 1804 sketches of the skull of P. medium (center) and reconstructed P. medium skull drawings among other fossil assortments (right)

In 1782, the French naturalist Robert de Lamanon described a fossil skull including the upper and lower jaws that was collected from the quarries of Montmartre, a hill near Paris that belonged to the nobleman Philippe-Laurent de Joubert. He recognized that the molars and incisors were roughly similar to those of ruminants but noted that the dentition lacked modern analogues. Consequently, he hypothesized that the animal was extinct, had an amphibious lifestyle, and fed on both plants and fish.

Since 1796, the French naturalist Georges Cuvier innovated the idea of vanished worlds of extinct animals, but as his observations of fossils were mostly limited to drawings and fragmentary fossils stored at the National Museum of Natural History, France, his palaeontological insight was limited early on. In 1798, he documented fossils from Montmartre, suggesting initially that they could have belonged to the canid genus Canis based on dental morphology. Later in the same year, he instead suggested that the fossils belonged to a pachyderm that was most closely related to tapirs and had trunks like them. He also figured out that the animals of Montmartre were of multiple species with different sizes and numbers of toes. The fossils of Montmartre were credited with great importance to the field of palaeontology, as they were embedded in deeper and harder sediments than other fossil mammals such as Megatherium. The science historian Bruno Belhoste argued that Cuvier's study of Palaeotherium in 1798 "marks the true birth of paleontology".

==== Early taxonomy and depictions ====
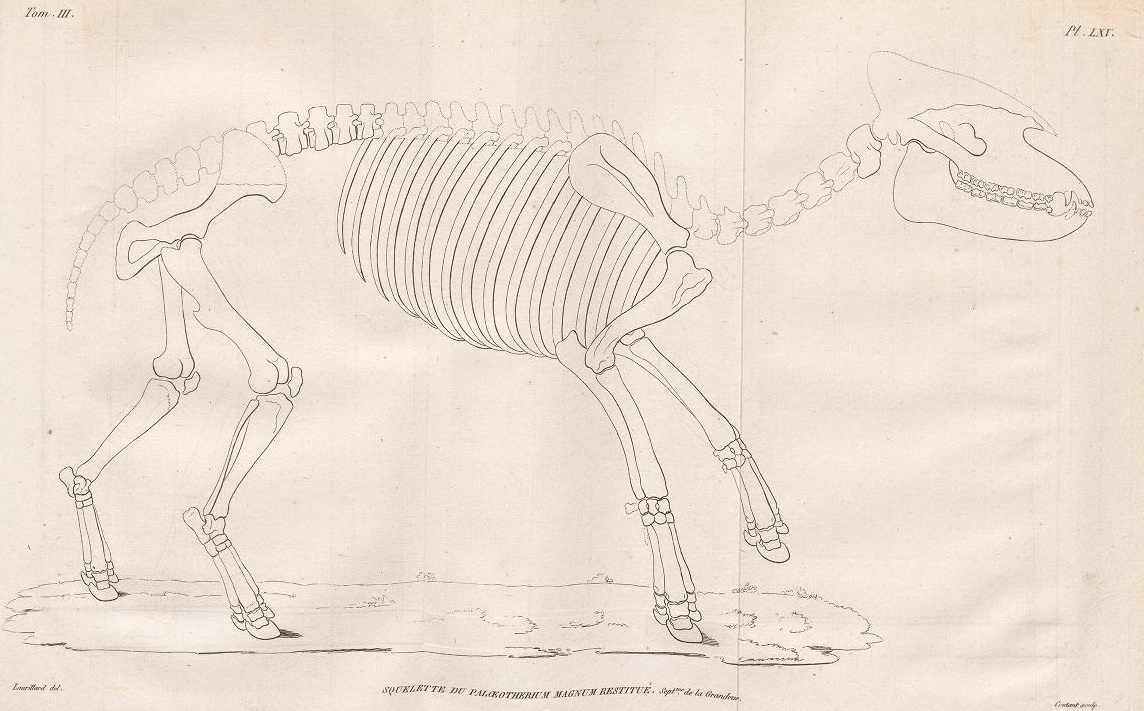
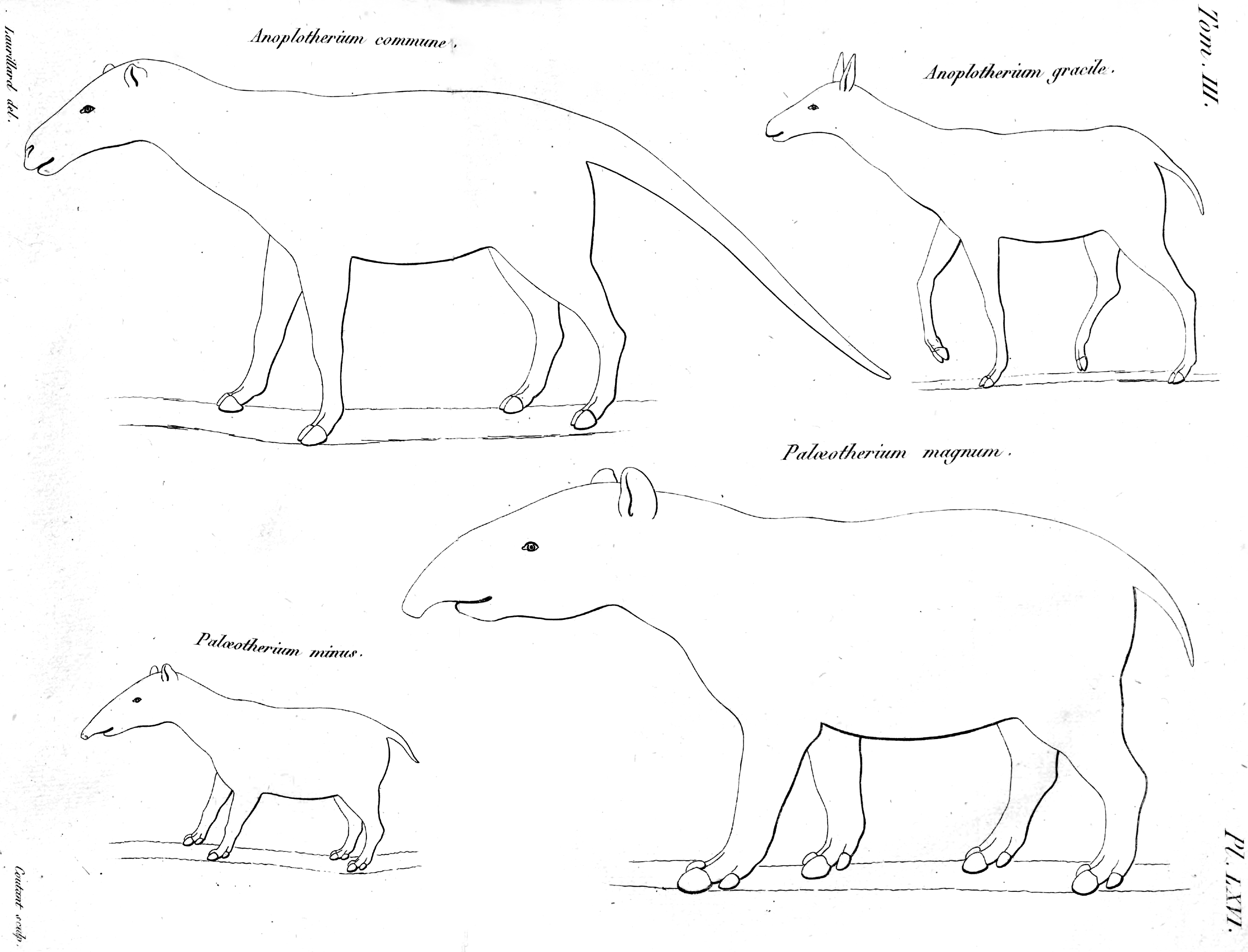
Reconstruction of the skeleton of P. magnum as depicted in 1822 (left) and drawings of species classified to Palaeotherium and Anoplotherium by Charles Léopold Laurillard under the work of Georges Cuvier (right)

In 1804, Cuvier confirmed that the skull previously reported by de Lamanon belonged to a mammal. The skull preserves a complete set of 44 teeth that are similar to those of rhinoceroses and hyraxes. Cuvier recognized that the skull differs from other mammals and therefore established a new genus and species, Palaeotherium medium. The genus name Palaeotherium means "ancient beast", which is a compound of the Greek prefix παλαιός ('palaios') meaning 'old' or 'ancient' and the suffix θήρ ('thēr') meaning 'beast' or 'wild animal'. He debunked Lamanon's hypothesis that Palaeotherium was an omnivorous amphibian and suspected that it had trunks akin to those of tapirs.

From 1804 up to 1824, Cuvier erected a total of 13 species of Palaeotherium based on skull, dental, and postcranial material. He erected the second of these species, P. magnum, in 1804, explaining that it had similar but larger-sized dentition than P. medium. In describing the third and small-sized species, P. minus, he began to focus on the study of postcranial material rather than just cranial and dental material. In 1805, Cuvier erected P. crassum based on the three-toed forefeet, which were similar to tapirs and rhinoceroses in the shape of the metacarpal bones. In 1812, he named another species, P. curtum, based on metacarpal bones that were slightly smaller than those of P. crassum. As of 1968, four of the Palaeotherium species named by Cuvier were considered valid and remained classified in Palaeotherium (P. medium, P. magnum, P. crassum, P. curtum), six were valid but were eventually reclassified to different genera by different palaeontologists (P. minus, P. tapiroïdes, P. buxovillanum, P. aurelianense, P. occitanicum, and P. isselanum), and three were considered invalid (P. giganteum, P. latum, and P. indeterminatum).

In 1812, Cuvier defined Palaeotherium as containing only tridactyl (or three-toed) species. He also speculated on life appearance and behaviour of several Palaeotherium species, but cautioned that such interpretations are limited by the fragmentary fossil material. He suggested that P. magnum would have resembled a horse-sized tapir with sparse hair. P. crassum and P. medium would also have had a tapir-like appearance, with proportionally longer legs and feet in the latter. Cuvier also published a speculative skeletal reconstruction of P. minus and hypothesized that it was smaller than a sheep and potentially cursorial given its slender legs and face. Finally, he theorized that P. curtum would have been the bulkiest species. In 1822, Cuvier published a reconstruction of the skeleton of P. magnum, outlining that it was the size of a Javan rhinoceros, was stocky in build, and had a massive head. The same year, Palaeotherium was also depicted in drawings by the French palaeontologist Charles Léopold Laurillard under the direction of Cuvier.

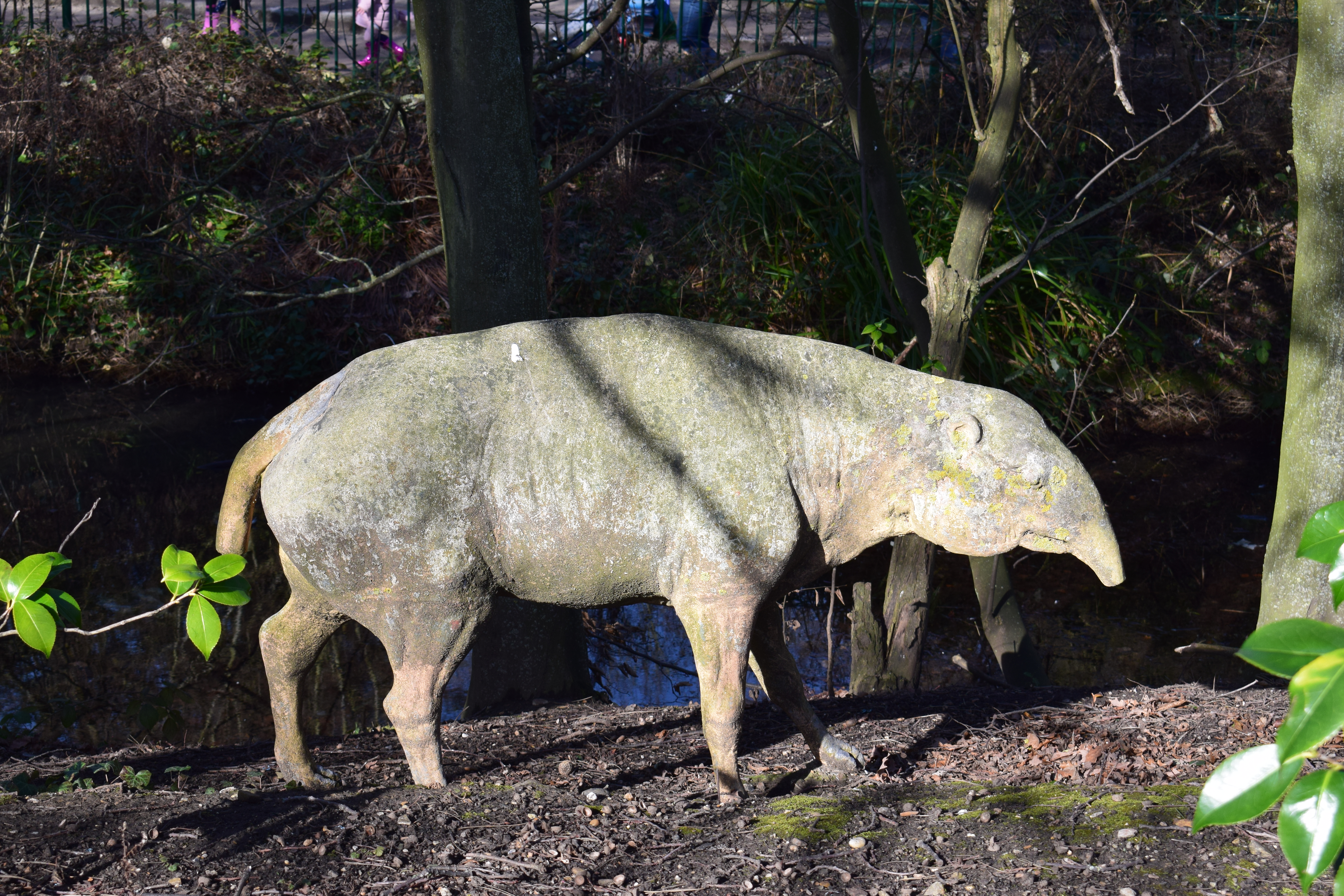
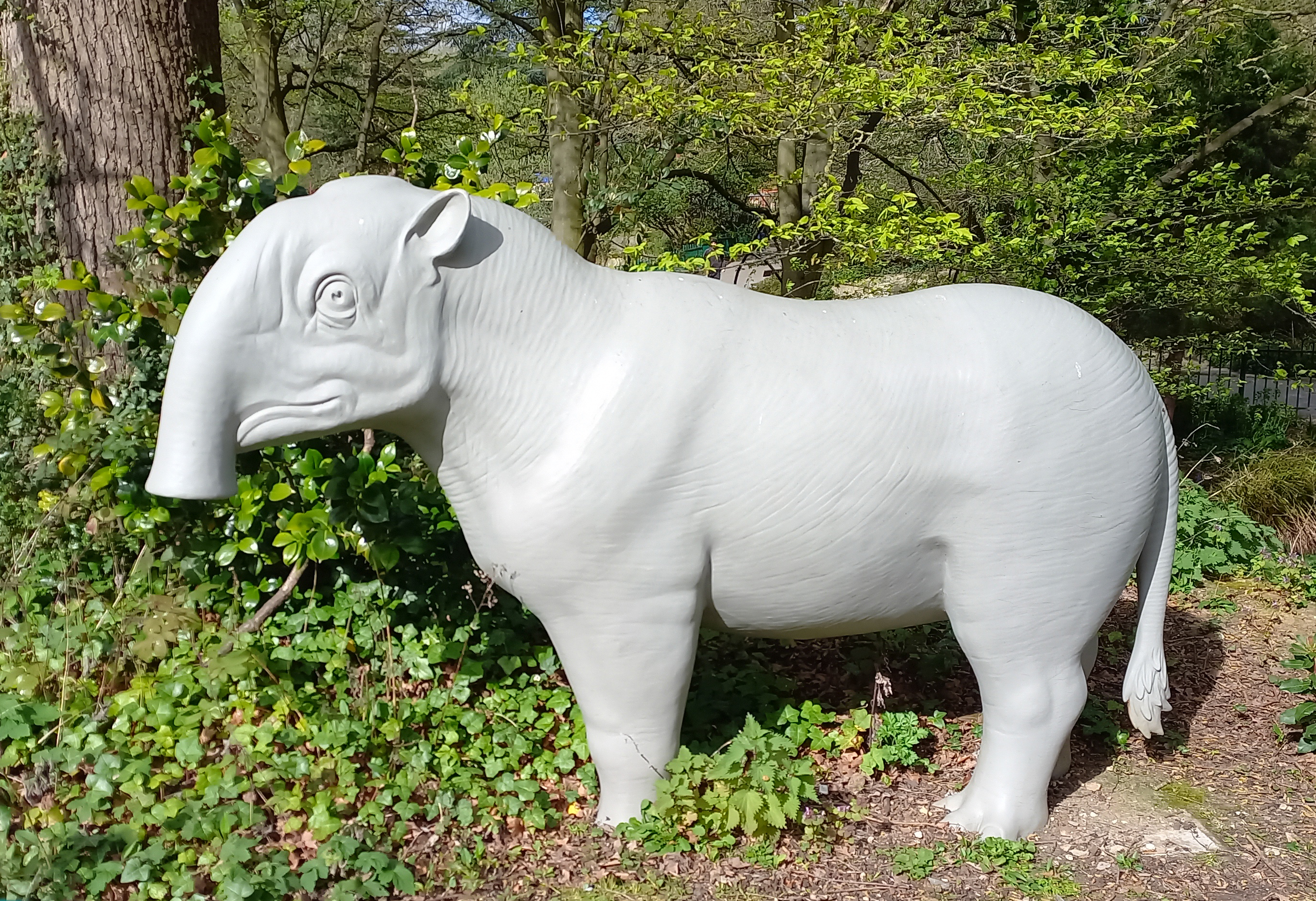
Sculptures of P. medium (left) and P. magnum (remade in 2023) as part of the Crystal Palace Dinosaurs sculptures on the Tertiary Island of the Crystal Palace Park, UK

Three sculptures representing Palaeotherium magnum, Palaeotherium medium and "Plagiolophus minus" (= Plagiolophus) are part of the Crystal Palace Dinosaurs exhibition in the Crystal Palace Park in London, which has been open to the public since 1854 and was created by the English sculptor Benjamin Waterhouse Hawkins. Both the P. magnum sculpture, the largest of the three, and the medium-sized P. medium sculpture were posed in a standing position, whereas the smaller "P. minus" sculpture depicts a sitting animal. The resemblance of the models to tapirs reflects early perceptions of the life appearance of Palaeotherium. However, the sculptures differ from living tapirs in several ways, such as shorter and taller faces, higher eye positions, slimmer legs, longer tails, and the presence of three toes on the forelimbs unlike the four toes of tapirs.

Of the three sculptures, P. medium most closely resembles a tapir, and it has remained mostly intact. P. medium was depicted as having thick skin and a slender face and trunk, representing outdated perceptions that it was a slow animal. The original P. magnum sculpture was last known from a 1958 photograph before it was lost at some point afterward (it was replaced by a new republicated model in 2023); the photograph reveals that it was the largest of the three sculptures and had a robust and muscular build with large and deep eyes, a proportionally large head, and bulky legs. The model's trunk was wide and descended below the lower lip. The overall anatomy appears to be based on elephants. Modern research in comparison suggests that Palaeotherium never had a trunk unlike with earlier works.

Palaeotherium proved to be a significant find to the field of palaeontology in multiple other aspects. For one, both the skeletal reconstruction drawing and the life restoration in Cuvier's works were incorporated into textbooks and handbooks around the world up to the 20th century. The genus was also incorporated into old orthogenesis models of the evolution of the horse theory as early as 1851 by British biologist Richard Owen and followed by other 19th century European naturalists such as Jean Albert Gaudry and Vladimir Kovalevsky.

==== Later 19th century taxonomy ====
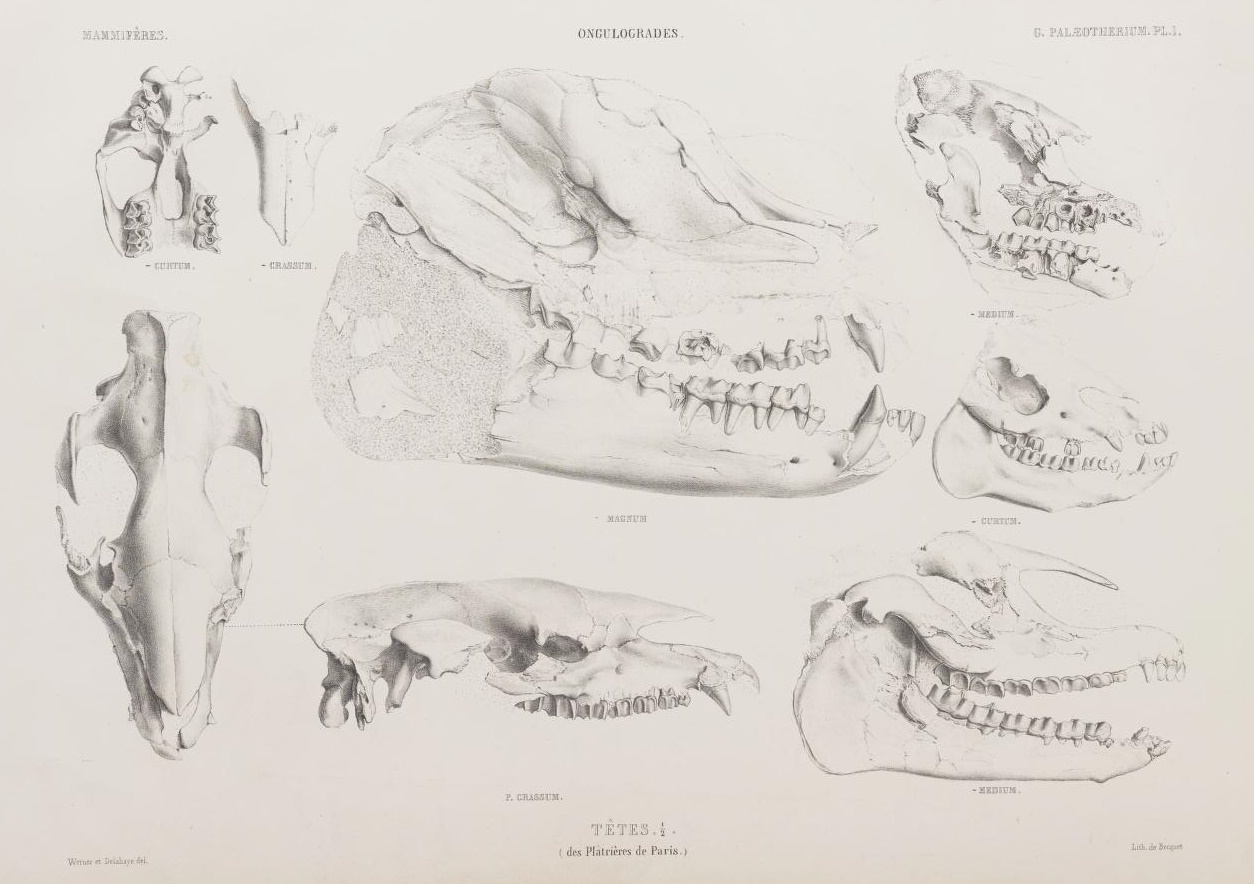
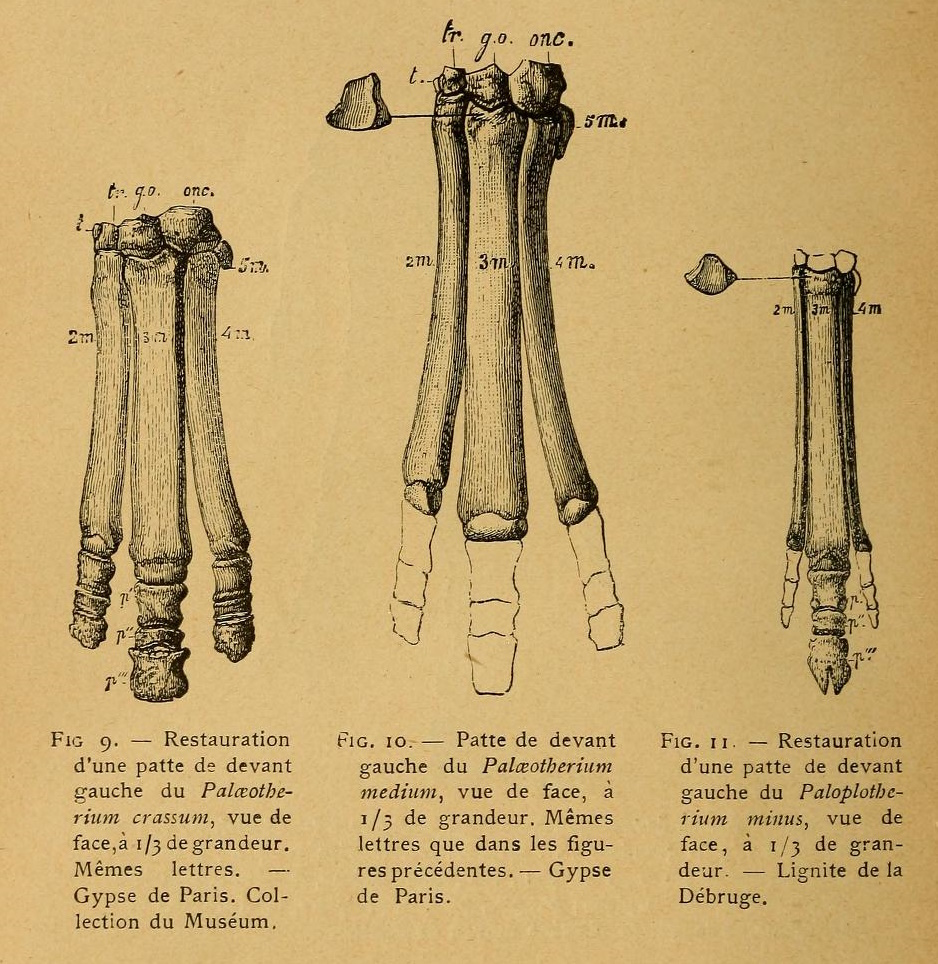
Illustrations of the fossil skulls (left) and limbs (right) of multiple palaeothere species including those of Palaeotherium

In the 19th century, several of Cuvier's Palaeotherium species have been reclassified under different genera. "P." aurelianense was reclassified as its own genus Anchitherium by the German palaeontologist Hermann von Meyer in 1844. In an 1839–1864 osteography, the French naturalist Henri Marie Ducrotay de Blainville relisted "P." tapiroides, "P." buxovillanum and "P." occitanicum as species belonging to Lophiodon, but the latter two were eventually moved to Paralophiodon and Lophiaspis, respectively, in the 20th century. In 1862, Swiss zoologist Ludwig Ruetimeyer considered the previously recognised genera Plagiolophus and Propalaeotherium as distinct from Palaeotherium; these contain the species P. minor and P. isselanum, respectively.

The 19th century also saw the erection of several new Palaeotherium species. In 1853, French palaeontologist Auguste Pomel erected the species P. duvali based on limb bones that he thought were less stocky than those of P. curtum. In his 1839–1864 osteography, Blainville erected P. girondicum, pointing out that its fossils were from the Gironde Basin and that Cuvier only briefly referenced it in an 1825 publication. In 1863, the French naturalist Jean-Baptiste Noulet created the species P. castrense based on an incomplete mandible that was uncovered from the commune of Viviers-lès-Montagnes that was placed in a fossil collection from Castres. In 1869, Swiss palaeontologists François Jules Pictet de la Rive and Aloïs Humbert erected the species Plagiolophus siderolithicus based on molars that are similar to those of P. minor but were smaller in size. The same year, German palaeontologist Oscar Fraas erected P. suevicum based on teeth that he thought had distinct enamel. The French naturalist Paul Gervais, in 1875, described fossil bones and teeth from the French commune of Dampleux, noting that they belonged to a species smaller than other Palaeotherium species and with dental dimensions similar to those of Plagiolophus minor. He assigned the fossils to the newly erected species P. eocaenum.

==== Palaeotherium skeletons ====
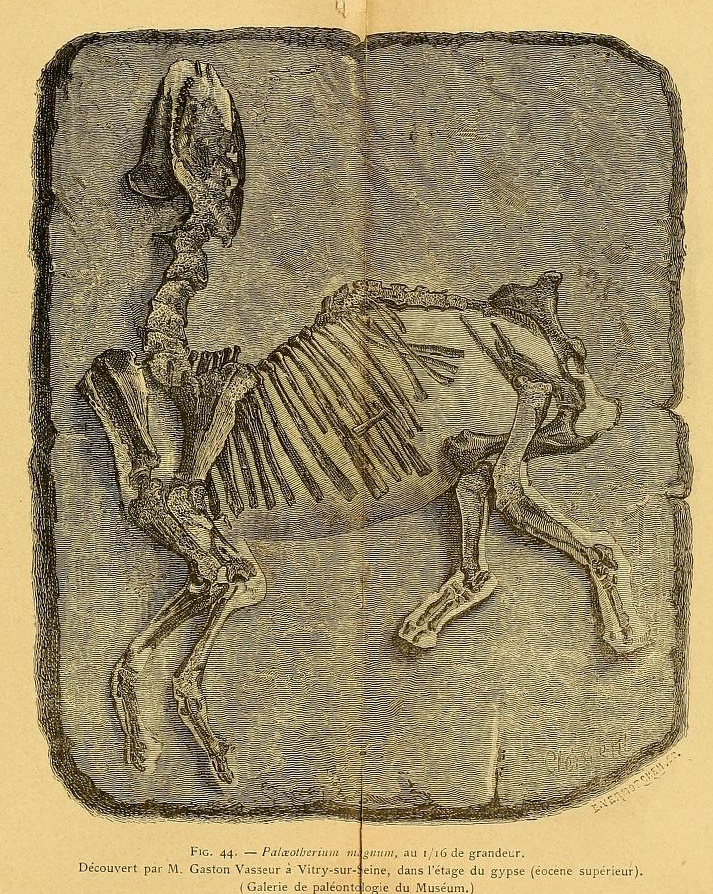
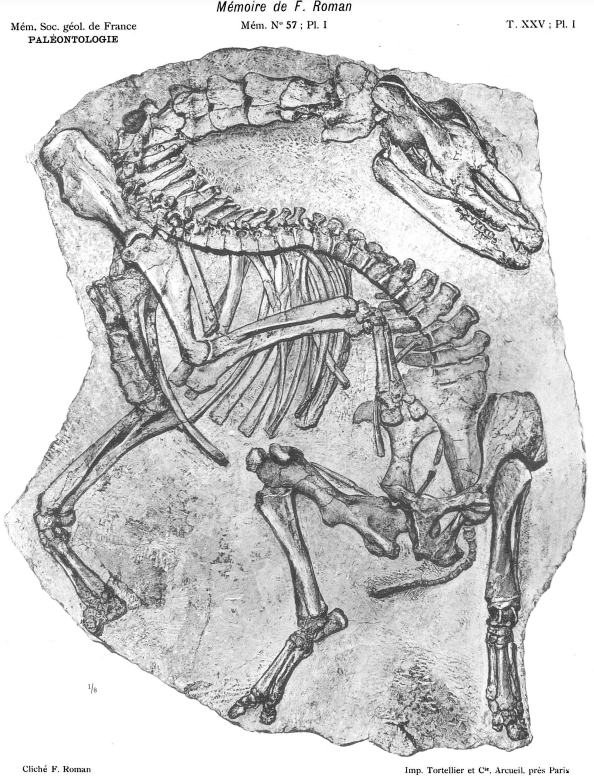
Illustrations of P. magnum skeletons from Vitry-sur-Seine (left) and Mormoiron (right)

In 1873, the French geologist Gaston Casimir Vasseur uncovered the first complete skeleton of Palaotherium, attributed to P. magnum, from a gypsum quarry in the commune of Vitry-sur-Seine. The quarry was owned by the civil engineer Fuchs, who donated the skeleton to the National Museum of Natural History, France. The skeleton was described by Gervais in the same year, who noted that the neck was longer than expected and that the build was less stocky than that of tapirs and rhinoceroses. The skull of the specimen measures 0.5 m (1 ft 8 in) long. The naturalist said that the excavation of the specimen was difficult but completed by multiple skillful workers. Since its description, it has been displayed at the Gallery of Paleontology and Comparative Anatomy of the museum as an important and famous component.

During the 20th century, a second complete skeleton of P. magnum was excavated from the plasters in the French commune of Mormoiron. It was sent to the geological department of the University of Lyon and described after preparation by the Austrian geologist Frédéric Roman in 1922. Roman published a reconstruction of the skeleton in his 1922 monography. According to Austrian palaeontologist Othenio Abel in 1924, it was the most complete skeleton of Palaeotherium and amongst the most complete of any early Cenozoic mammal known at the time, missing only a few ribs and the left femur.

==== 20th century revisions ====
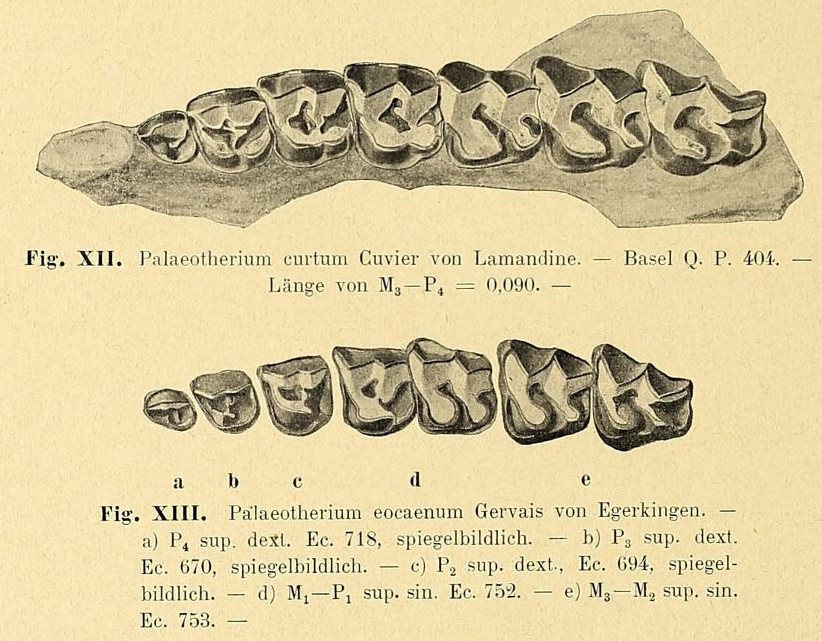
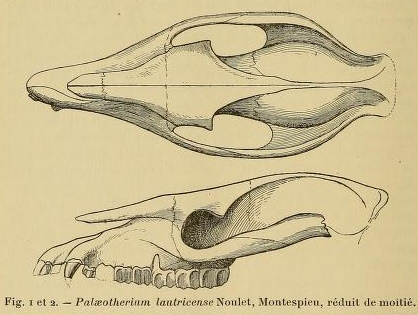
Illustrations of the dentition of P. curtum and P. eocaenum (left) and a reconstructed skull of P. lautricense (right)

In 1904, Swiss palaeontologist Hans Georg Stehlin created the species P. lautricense based on an upper jaw stored in the Muséum de Toulouse that originated from sandstone deposits at Castres. He also assigned two somewhat crushed skulls to this species. In his monography on palaeotheres, published the same year, Stehlin considered most species of Palaeotherium as potentially valid, but noted that most taxonomists were reluctant to invalidate species erected by Cuvier. Stehlin considered P. girondicum to be a form of P. magnum, and described two forms of P. curtum from jaw fragments from La Débruge. He also named three new species – P. Mühlbergi, (Note: The latin script letter "ü" as used in multiple species names has been replaced by the letter combination "ue". Due to archaic species naming conventions, authors of the 19th and 20th centuries tended to capitalize species names based on individuals or places.) based on dental material from the Swiss municipality of Obergösgen; P. Renevieri, based on new finds from Mormont and a mandible identified by Pictet in 1869; and P. Rütimeyeri, from the municipality of Egerkingen, which he described as having primitive premolars. In 1917, French palaeontologist Charles Depéret recognized two additional species of Palaeotherium – P. Euzetense and P. Stehlini.

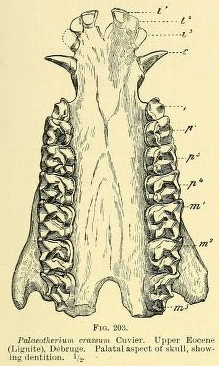
Upper jaw and palate of P. crassum from the French locality of La Débruge with a mostly complete dental set

In 1968, upcoming German palaeontologist Jens Lorenz Franzen, then a graduate student, made major revisions of Palaeotherium in his dissertation. He invalidated several species as dubious names (P. giganteum (considered to have been a rhinocerotid instead), P. gracile, P. parvulum, P. commune, P. primaevum, and P. gervaisii) and synonymized many others with P. magnum (P. aniciense, P. subgracile), P. medium (P. brivatense, P. moeschi), P. crassum (P. indeterminatum), P. curtum (P. latum and P. buseri), P. duvali (P. kleini), and P. muehlbergi (P. velaunum). He additionally invalidated many species that had been erected throughout the 19th and early 20th centuries. He also erected P. pomeli based on fossils from a locality in Castres and reclassified "Plagiolophus" siderolithicum as a species of Palaeotherium. Furthermore, Franzen converted some species into subspecies (P. magnum girondicum, P. magnum stehlini, P. medium suevicum, and P. medium euzetense) and named six additional subspecies.

In 1975, Spanish palaeontologist María Lourdes Casanovas-Cladellas erected the species P. crusafonti from a left maxilla with dentition from the Spanish site of Roc de Santa. In 1980, both she and José-Vicente Santafé Llopis established a second Iberian species, P. franzeni, from the Spanish municipality of Sossís based on differences in dentition. In 1985, the French palaeontologist Jean-Albert Remy named a new subspecies, P. muehlbergi thaleri, in honor of fellow palaeontologist Louis Thaler; these fossils, consisting of two skulls with mandibles, were from the commune of Saint-Étienne-de-l'Olm.

In 1991, Casanovas-Cladellas and Santafé Llopis erected P. llamaquiquense from partial jaw material from the Spanish locality of Llamaquique in the city of Oviedo, where the name derived from. The next year in 1992, Remy proposed the creation of two subgenera of Palaeotherium based on cranial characteristics: Palaeotherium and Franzenitherium. In 1993, the Spanish palaeontologist Miguel Ángel Cuesta Ruiz-Colmenares established the species P. giganteum based on teeth from the Mazaterón site in the Duero Basin, considering it to be the largest species of Palaeotherium known. In 1998, Casanovas-Cladellas et al. erected the subspecies P. crassum sossissense from a fragmented right maxilla with dentition from Sossís in Spain. They also invalidated the previously named P. franzeni and reassigned the material to P. magnum stehlini.

=== Classification and evolution ===
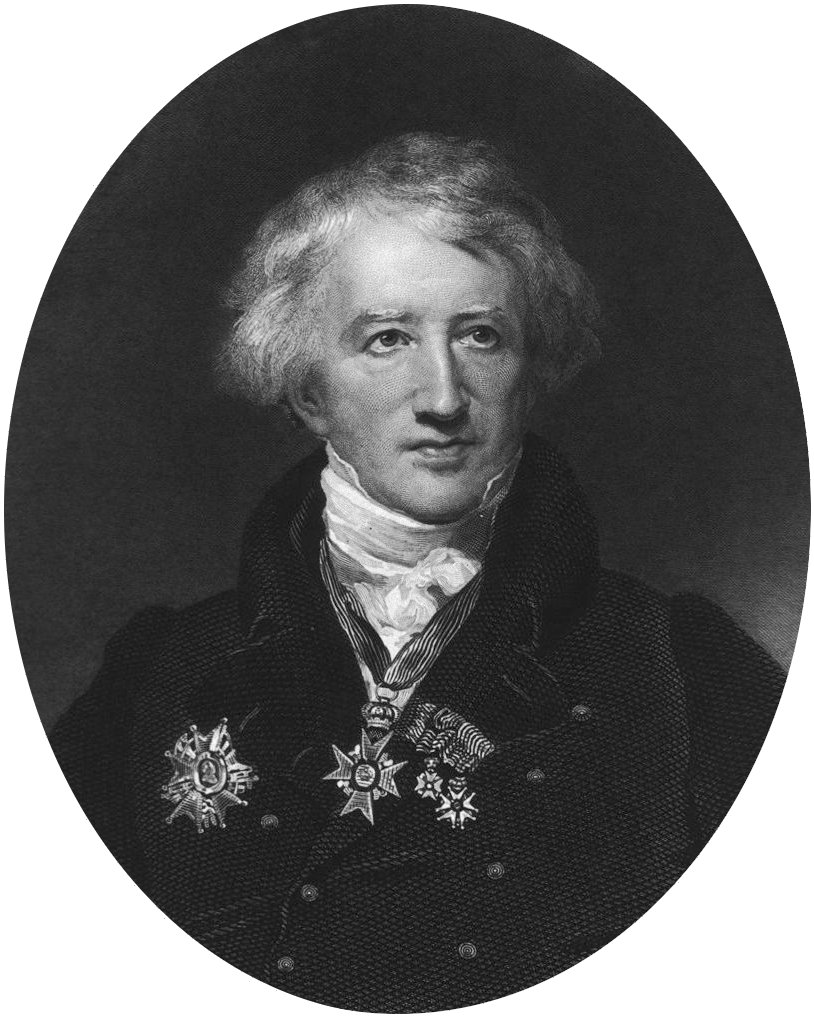
Portrait of Georges Cuvier, the French naturalist who described Palaeotherium and Anoplotherium in 1804

Palaeotherium is the type genus of the Palaeotheriidae, largely considered to be one of two major hippomorph families in the superfamily Equoidea, the other being the Equidae. Alternatively, some authors have proposed that equids are more closely related to the Tapiromorpha than to the Palaeotheriidae. It is also usually thought to consist of two families, the Palaeotheriinae and Pachynolophinae; a few authors alternatively have argued that pachynolophines are more closely related to other perissodactyl groups than to palaeotheriines. Some authors have also considered the Plagiolophinae to be a separate subfamily, while others group its genera into the Palaeotheriinae. Palaeotherium has also been suggested to belong to the tribe Palaeotheriini, one of three proposed tribes within the Palaeotheriinae along with the Leptolophini and Plagiolophini. The Eurasian distribution of the palaeotheriids (or palaeotheres) were in contrast to equids, which are generally thought to have been an endemic radiation in North America. Some of the most basal equoids of the European landmass are of uncertain affinities, with some genera being thought to potentially belong to the Equidae. Palaeotheres are well-known for having lived in western Europe during much of the Palaeogene but were also present in eastern Europe, possibly the Middle East, and, in the case of pachynolophines (or pachynolophs), Asia.

The Perissodactyla makes its earliest known appearance in the European landmass in the MP7 faunal unit of the Mammal Palaeogene zones. During the temporal unit, many genera of basal equoids such as Hyracotherium, Pliolophus, Cymbalophus, and Hallensia made their first appearances there. A majority of the genera persisted to the MP8-MP10 units, and pachynolophines such as Propalaeotherium and Orolophus arose by MP10. The MP13 unit saw the appearances of later pachynolophines such as Pachynolophus and Anchilophus along with definite records of the first palaeotheriines such as Palaeotherium and Paraplagiolophus. The palaeotheriine Plagiolophus has been suggested to have potentially made an appearance by MP12. It was by MP14 that the subfamily proceeded to diversify, and the pachynolophines were generally replaced but still reached the late Eocene. In addition to more widespread palaeothere genera such as Plagiolophus, Palaeotherium, and Leptolophus, some of their species reaching medium to large sizes, various other palaeothere genera that were endemic to the Iberian Peninsula, such as Cantabrotherium, Franzenium, and Iberolophus, appeared by the middle Eocene.

The phylogenetic tree for several members of the family Palaeotheriidae, as well as three outgroups, as created by Remy in 2017 and followed by Remy et al. in 2019 is defined below:

- - - Cardiolophus radinskyi
    - Hallensia matthesi
  - Pliolophus vulpiceps
  - Palaeotheriidae
    - Hyracotherium leporinum
    - - "Hyracotherium" levei
      - - "Hyracotherium" remyi
        - - Orolophus maldani
          - - Pachynolophus spp.
            - - - - - Lophiotherium spp.
                  - Eurohippus parvulus
                - Propalaeotherium hassiacum
              - - Propalaeotherium cf. gaudryi AUM
                - - Propalaeotherium gaudryi
                  - - Propalaeotherium sudrei
                    - - Propalaeotherium isselanum
                      - Palaeotheriinae
                        - Leptolophus nouleti
                        - - Plagiolophus minor
                          - Palaeotherium magnum

As shown in the above phylogeny, the Palaeotheriidae is recovered as a monophyletic clade, meaning that it did not leave any derived descendant groups in its evolutionary history. Hyracotherium sensu stricto (in a strict sense) is defined as amongst the first offshoots of the family and a member of the Pachynolophinae. "H." remyi, formerly part of the now-invalid genus Propachynolophus, is defined as a sister taxon to more derived palaeotheres. Both Pachynolophus and Lophiotherium, defined as pachynolophines, are defined as monophyletic genera. The other pachynolophines Eurohippus and Propalaeotherium constitute a paraphyletic clade in relation to members of the derived and monophyletic subfamily Palaeotheriinae (Leptolophus, Plagiolophus, and Palaeotherium), thus making Pachynolophinae a paraphyletic subfamily clade.

=== Inner systematics ===
Since 1968, many species of Palaeotherium have multiple defined subspecies that are justified by various intraspecific variations. Later since 1992, two subgenera are officially recognized for Palaeotherium. The first of these subgenera is Palaeotherium, which includes the type species P. magnum along with P. medium, P. crassum, P. curtum, P. castrense, P. siderolithicum, and P. muehlbergi. The second subgenus is Franzenitherium, which includes the type species P. lautricense as well as P. duvali and was named in honor of Franzen's review of Palaeotherium. The subgenus Palaeotherium is distinct from another subgenus Franzenitherium based on specialized traits. For example, the orbit of Palaeotherium being aligned in front of the skull's midlength is a specialized trait compared to that of Franzenitherium being aligned more with the skull's midlength. Several Palaeotherium species are too fragmentary to be placed in any of the subgenera. The following table lists all valid species and subspecies of Palaeotherium, the subgenus that each is classified to, the Mammal Palaeogene faunal units that they are recorded from based on fossil deposit appearances, the authors who named the taxa, and the year that they were formally named:

Comparative table of Palaeotherium lineages
Lineage	Proposed subgenus	MP unit(s)	Author(s) of taxon	Taxon publication year
P. castrense castrense	Palaeotherium	14, 16	Noulet	1863
P. castrense robiacense	Palaeotherium	16	Franzen	1968
P. crassum sossisense	Palaeotherium	17	Casanovas-Cladellas, Checa, and Santafé Llopis	1998
P. crassum robustum	Palaeotherium	18	Franzen	1968
P. crassum crassum	Palaeotherium	19	Cuvier	1805
P. crusafonti	Incertae sedis	17	Casanovas-Cladellas	1975
P. curtum villerealense	Palaeotherium	17, 18	Franzen	1968
P. curtum curtum	Palaeotherium	19	Cuvier	1812
P. curtum frohnstettense	Palaeotherium	20	Franzen	1968
P. duvali priscum	Franzenitherium	17	Franzen	1968
P. duvali duvali	Franzenitherium	19	Pomel	1853
P. eocaenum	Incertae sedis	13, 14	Gervais	1875
P. giganteum	Incertae sedis	16	Cuesta	1993
P. lautricense	Franzenitherium	16	Stehlin	1904
P. llamaquiquense	Incertae sedis	16	Casanovas-Cladellas & Santafé Llopis	1991
P. magnum stehlini	Palaeotherium	17	Depéret	1917
P. magnum girondicum	Palaeotherium	18	Blainville	1846
P. magnum magnum	Palaeotherium	19, 20	Cuvier	1804
P. medium euzetense	Palaeotherium	17	Depéret	1917
P. medium perrealense	Palaeotherium	18	Stehlin	1904
P. medium medium	Palaeotherium	19	Cuvier	1804
P. medium suevicum	Palaeotherium	20, 21	Fraas	1869
P. muehlbergi praecursum	Palaeotherium	17	Franzen	1968
P. muehlbergi thaleri	Palaeotherium	18	Remy	1985
P. muehlbergi muehlbergi	Palaeotherium	19, 20	Stehlin	1904
P. pomeli	Incertae sedis	16	Franzen	1968
P. renevieri	Incertae sedis	19	Stehlin	1904
P. ruetimeyeri	Incertae sedis	14, 16	Stehlin	1904
P. siderolithicum	Palaeotherium	16, 17, 18, 19	Pictet & Humbert	1869

== Description ==
=== Skull ===
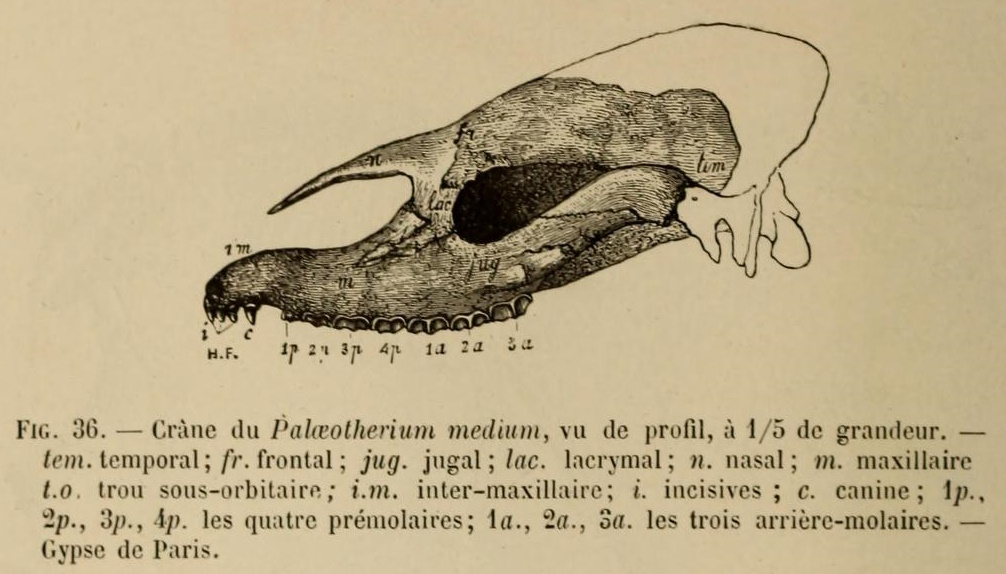
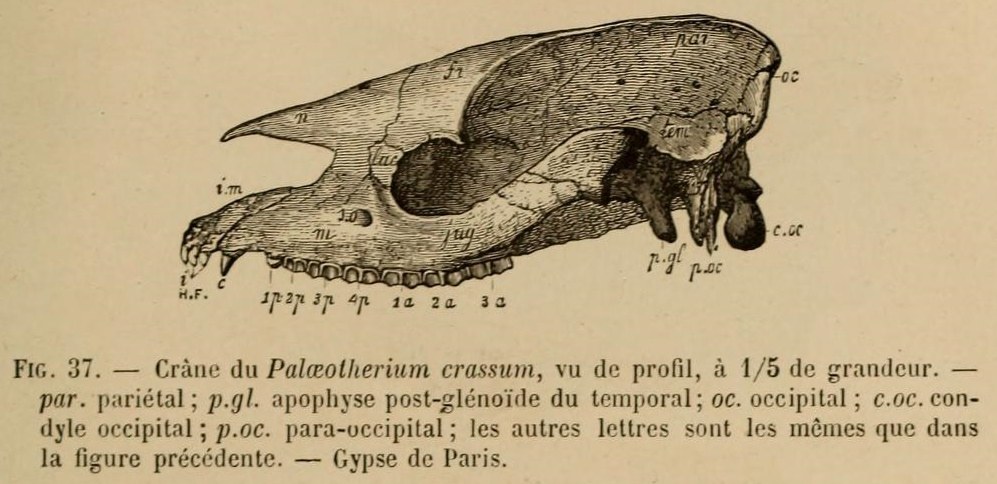
Illustrations of the craniums of P. medium (left) and P. crassum (right) with labeled cranial and dental portions, 1878

The Palaeotheriidae are distinguished from other perissodactyls mostly based on features of the skull. For example, the orbits are generally wide open at the back and are located in the middle of the skull or slightly more frontwards. The nasal bones of palaeotheres are thick to very thick. Palaeotherium itself is characterized by several cranial traits that distinguish it from other palaeothere genera such as an elongated zygomatic process of the squamosal bone extending to the maxilla and the presence of an anastomosis (anatomical connection between two passageways) roughly at the sphenoid bone and prominent temporalis muscle developments. The calvaria ranges in base length from 150 mm (5.9 in) to 520 mm (20 in) depending on the species.

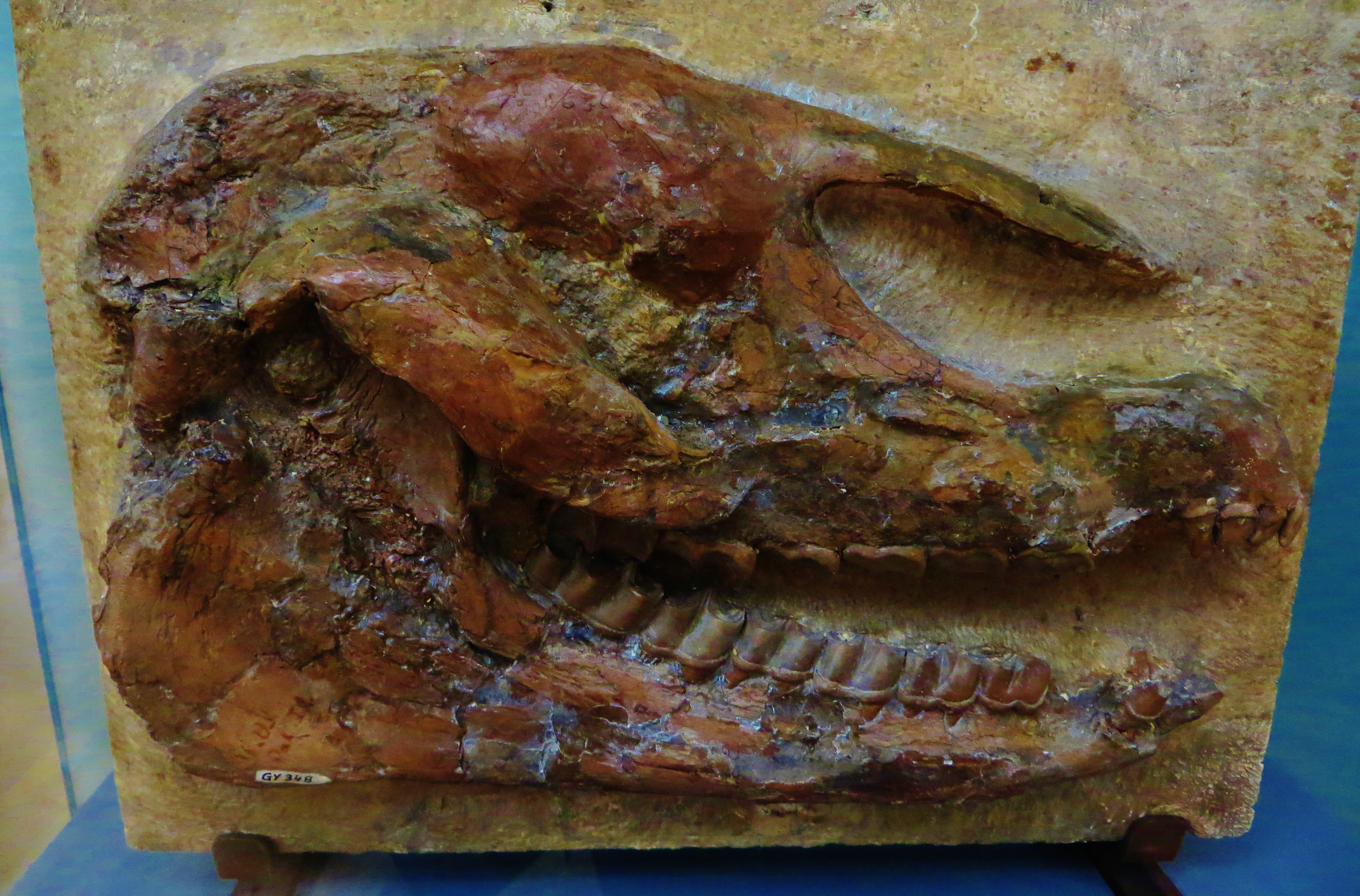
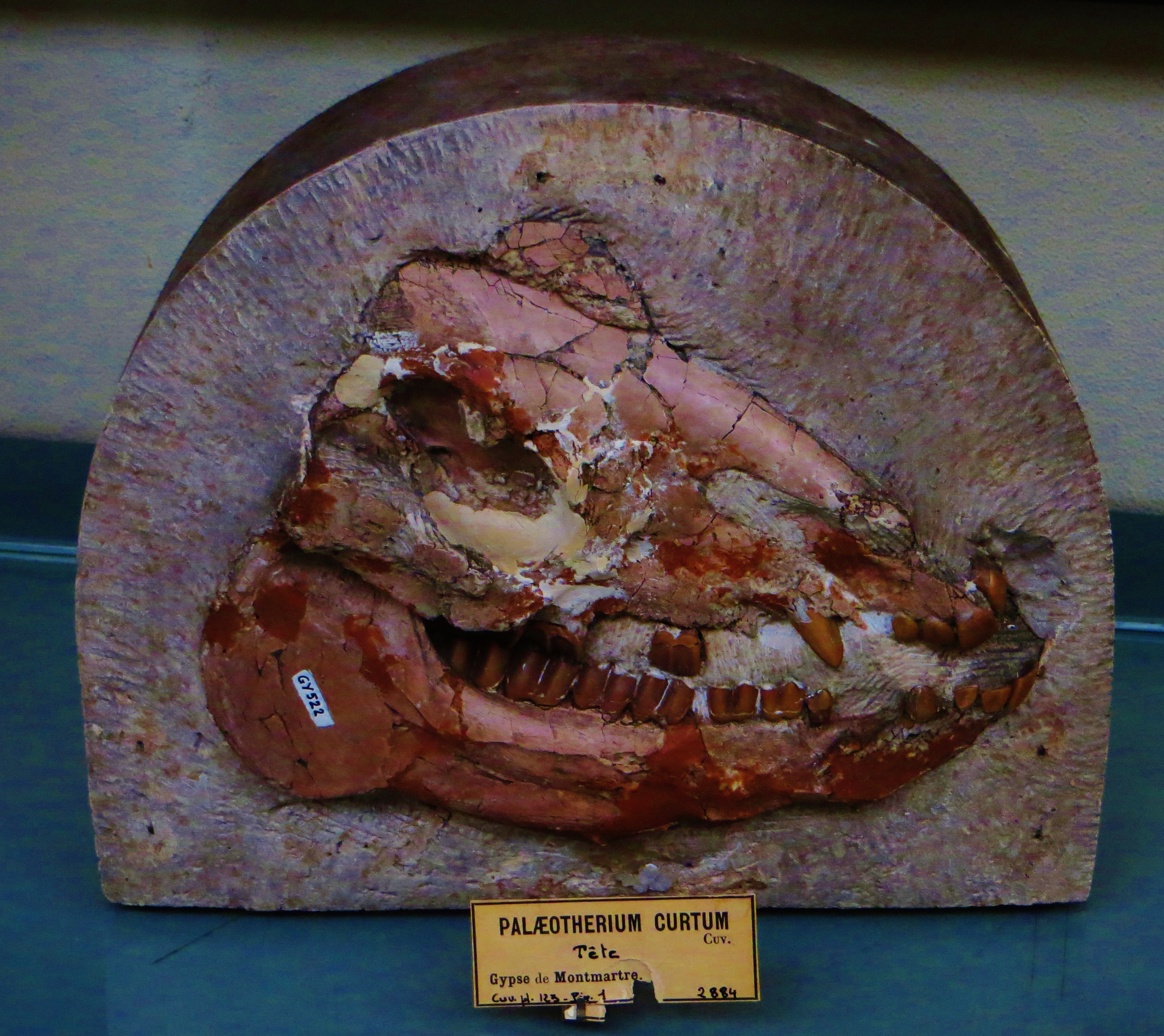
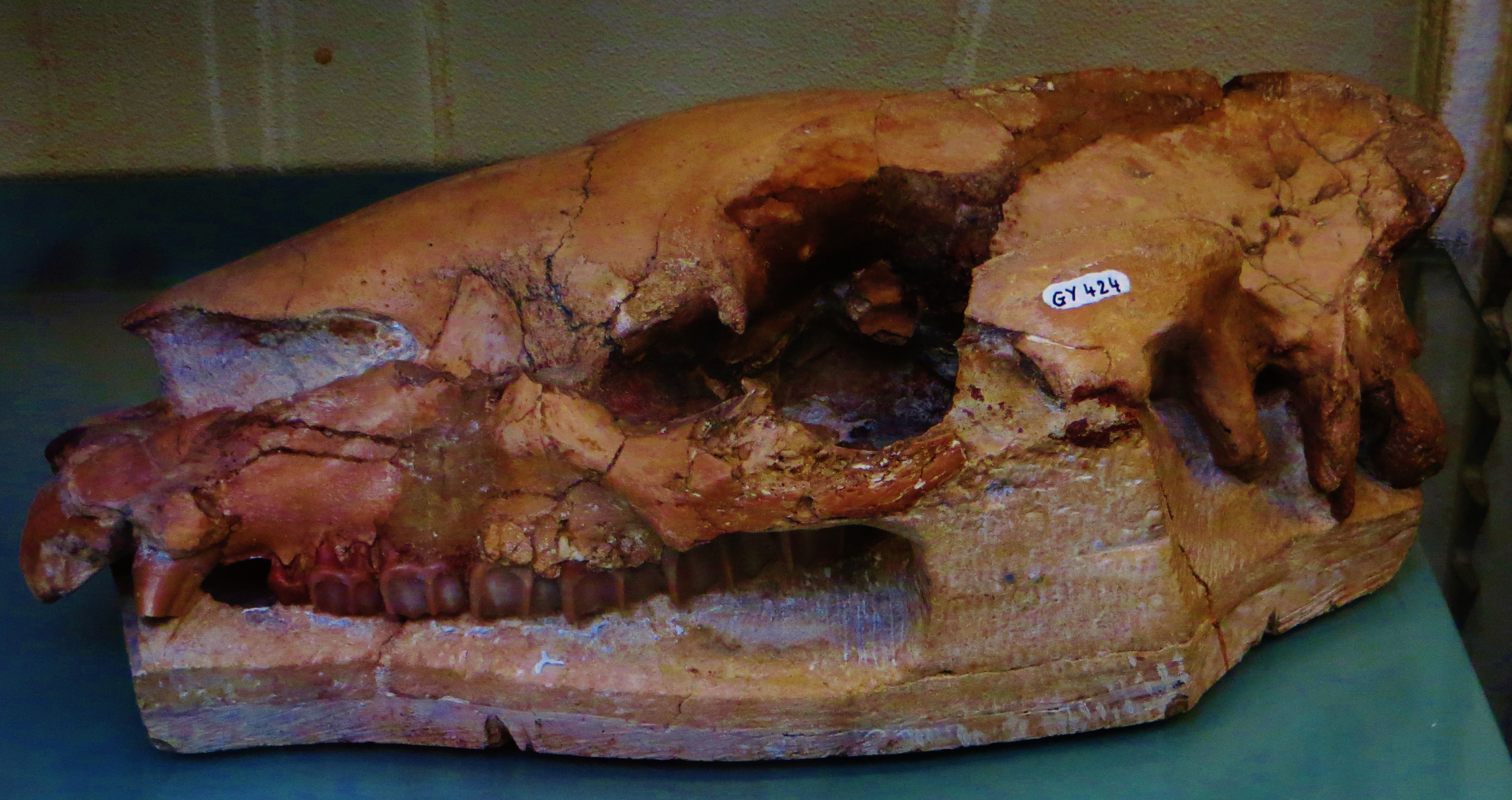
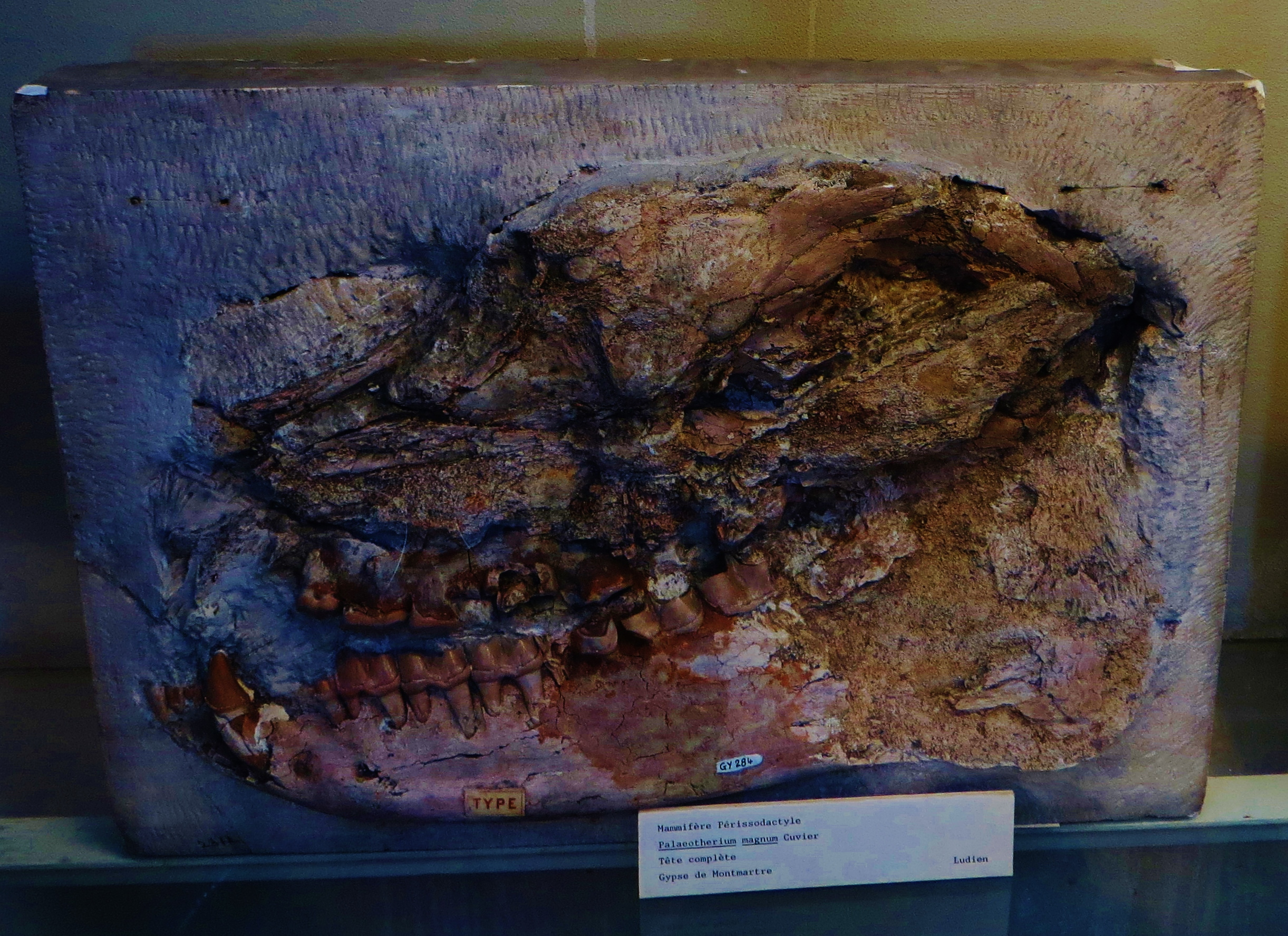
Palaeotherium spp. skulls, National Museum of Natural History, France. Clockwise from upper left: P. medium, P. curtum, P. magnum, and P. crassum.

The height and weight proportions of the skull of Palaeotherium are roughly equivalent with those of other taxa within the Equoidea; members of the superfamily have relatively shortened front facial areas. The skull's top peaks at the far back area, although this is not observed in P. lautricense. The sagittal crest can be prominent and depends on the age and sex of the individual for development. In comparison to other equoids where the skull's maximum width extends above the front root of the parallel zygomatic arches, those of Palaeotherium and most other palaeotheres (except Leptolophus) extend back to the joint of the squamosal bone and mandible. The orbit on the skull of Palaeotherium, unlike that of other equoids, is proportionally smaller and located somewhat in front of the skull's midlength, the latter trait of which may be further extended in the case of P. medium. Similar to other Palaeogene equoids, the front edge of the orbit is aligned with M^{1} or M^{2} while the back area is wide. Unlike most other palaeotheres, its nasal opening stretches up to the P^{3} tooth at minimum or up to the front edge of the orbit above M^{3} in the case of P. magnum. While the shapes and proportions of the nasal bones vary by species, they extend beyond P^{1} in adults and sometimes even the canine like in equines. The temporal fossae are large but vary in proportion. The cranial vault is broad, domed, and wider than the overall skull.

The horizontal ramus of the mandible is overall thick plus tall and has an elongated mandibular symphysis, but the width and lower area morphology vary by species. It is wide in both the front and back areas and low compared to equines. The joint for the squamosal and mandible of Palaeotherium is low compared to those of Plagiolophus and Leptolophus. The angular process, located above the angle of the mandible, is blocked from further expansion by the mandibular notch and is well-developed in its rear like in Palaeogene equids.

=== Dentition ===
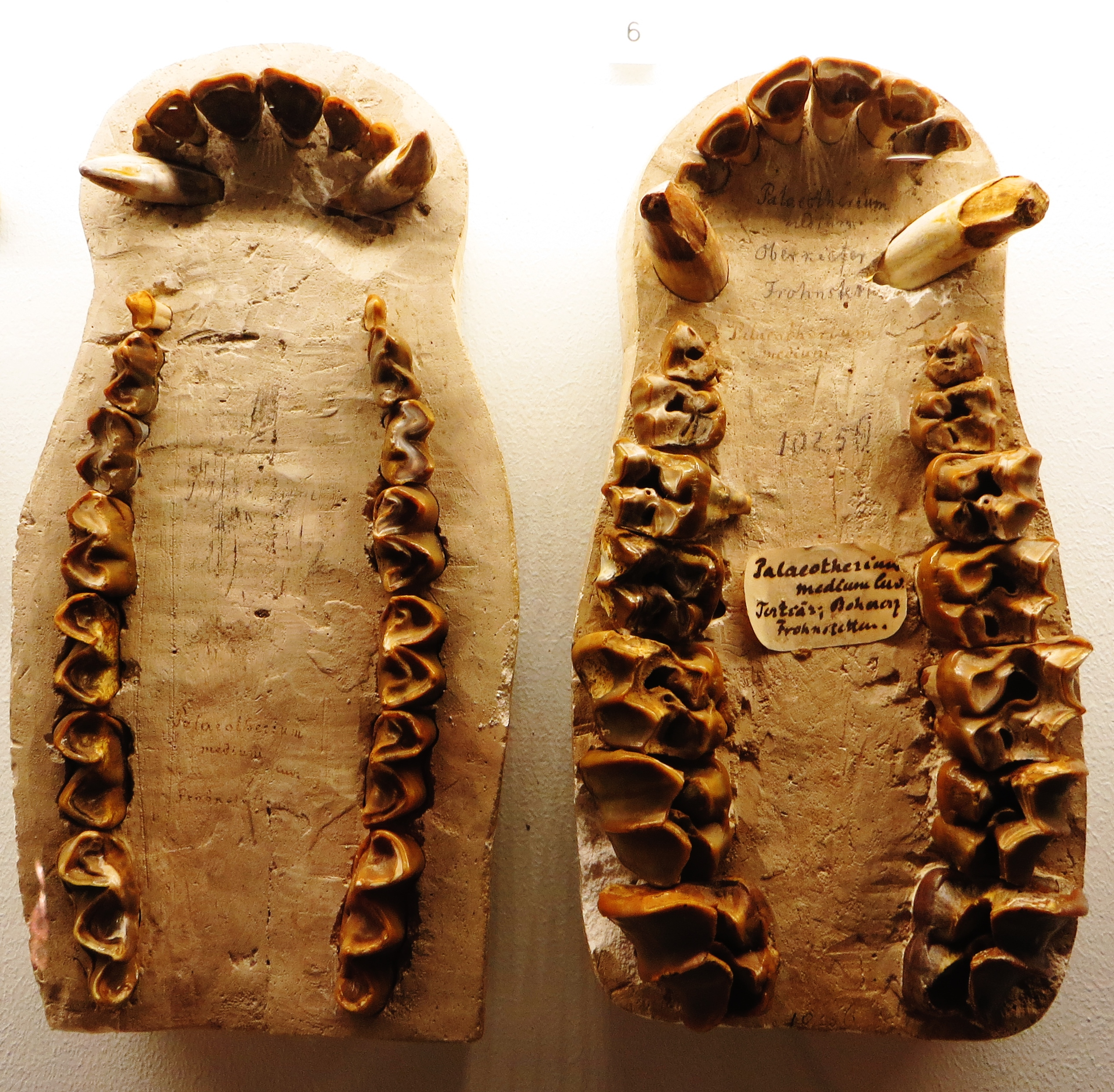
P. muehlbergi dentition, The Paleontological Collection of the University of Tübingen

Derived palaeotheres are generally diagnosed as having selenolophodont (selenodont-lophodont ridge form) upper molars and selenodont (crescent-shaped ridge form) lower molars that are mesodont, or medium-crowned, in height. The canines strongly protrude and are separated from the premolars by medium to long diastemata (gaps between two close teeth) and from the incisors by short ones in both the upper and lower dentition. The other teeth are paired closely with each other in both the upper and lower rows. The dental formula of Palaeotherium is 3.1.4.33.1.4.3 for a total of 44 teeth, consistent with the primitive dental formula for early-middle Palaeogene placental mammals.

The incisors are shovel-shaped and, like in modern horses, are used for chewing at right angles in relation to their longitudinal axes. They have no cutting functions but instead are used for grasping food akin to how tweezers grasp items. The canines are proportionally large and dagger-shaped. They were probably not used for cutting or chewing given how they are oriented, but may have been used in self-defence and conspecific fights. The decreased length of the postcanine diastema in Palaeotherium and the equid subfamily Anchitheriinae may be correlated with increases in body size. This trend may be due to the necessity to improve chewing performances through molarization and proportional size increases of the premolars. Postcanine diastemata are strongly reduced in early species such as P. castrense; in later species, they vary from small (P. crassum, P. curtum) to large (P. medium, P. magnum). The separation of cheek teeth from the incisors and canines attests to their independent and specific chewing functions.

The premolars and preceding deciduous teeth both tend to have molarized forms (meaning molar-like shapes) and have newly developing hypocone cusps on them. The forms of the deciduous premolars (dP) of juvenile Palaeotherium and other palaeotheriines distinguish them from the earlier pachynolophines, where the dP^{2}-dP^{4} of juvenile P. renevieri and P. magnum are both molarized and four-cusped (although dP^{1} is triangular). Late Eocene species of Palaeotherium tend to have more molariform premolars. The non-molarized premolars are composed of four to five cusps (one to two external, two intermediate, and one internal) while the molarized premolars and molars have six cusps (two external, two intermediate, and two internal). The upper molars are medium-crowned (shorter than those of modern equids) and have ectolophs (crests or ridges of upper molar teeth) that are about twice the height of the inner cusps and curve into a W shape. The W-shaped ectolophs themselves are made up of two articulated crescents. The lower molarized premolars and molars are about half as wide as their upper counterparts. The mesostyle cusp (a small cusp type) present in the molars thicken from M^{1} to M^{3}. The lingual lobes (or divisions) in the upper molars are closely aligned with the ectolophs.

=== Postcranial skeleton ===
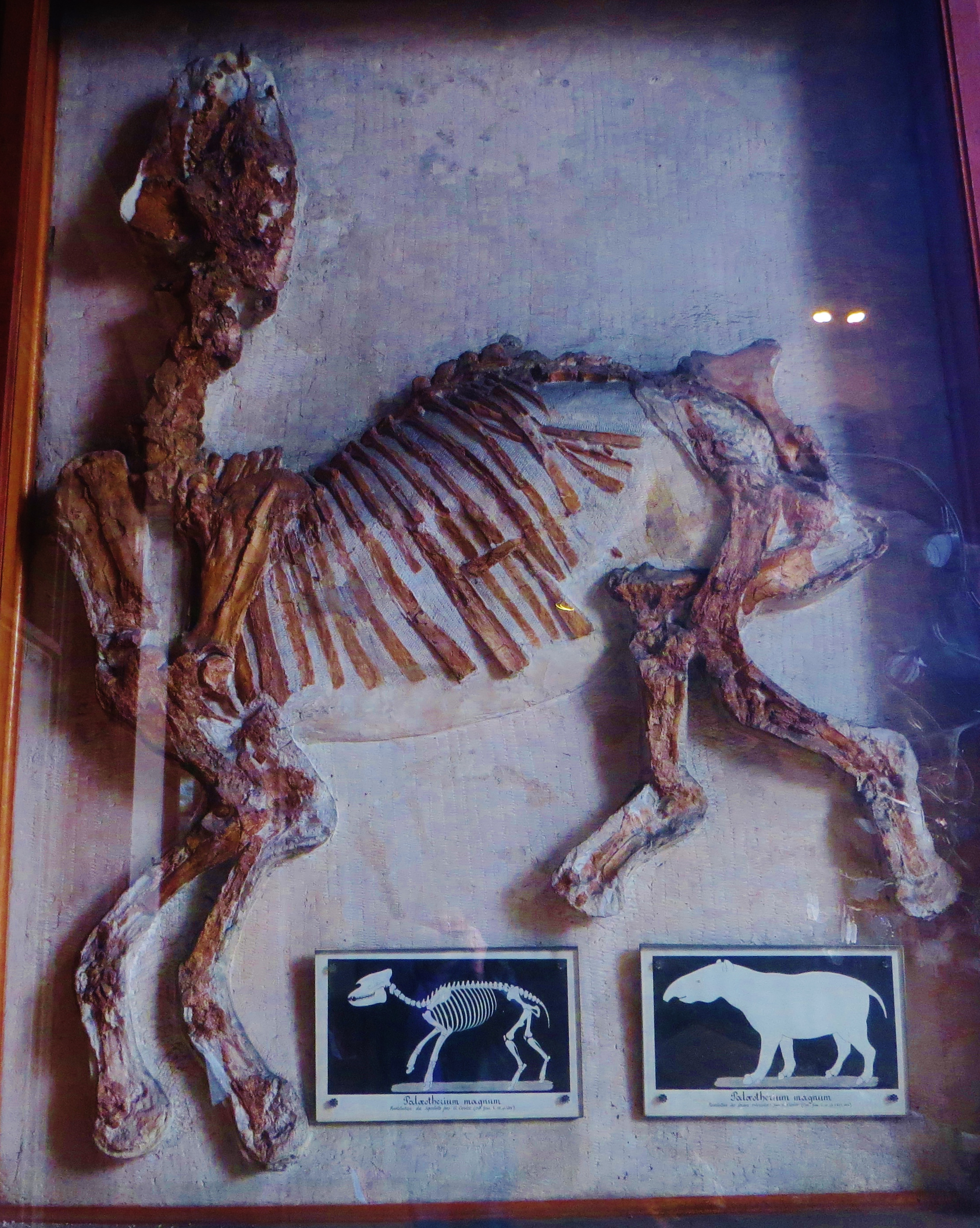
P. magnum skeleton from Vitry-sur-Seine, NMNH, France

The overall postcranial anatomy of Palaeotherium is best known from a skeleton of P. magnum uncovered from Mormoiron. The vertebral column is made up of seven large cervical vertebrae, seventeen thoracic vertebrae, six lumbar vertebrae, six sacral vertebrae, and fifteen caudal vertebrae. The cervical vertebrae, comprising the neck, measure 65 cm (26 in) long while the caudal vertebrae, comprising the tail, measure 35 cm (14 in) long. The sacrum is triangular and similar to that of the Equidae, but is slightly wider in its front area. P. magnum would have had a total of thirty-four ribs based on the total number of thoracic vertebrae. Like in equids, the front ribs are strong and flattened. The back portion of the thorax would have been wider than in horses and roughly comparable to those of tapirs and rhinoceroses but was not as long as that of the latter. The ribs are separated from the sternum, which is approximately the same size as the thorax.

P. magnum has generally strong and stocky limb bones. The femora (thigh bones) of P. crassum and P. medium, in comparison, are less robust. Palaeotherium has a straighter and less concave trochlea of the astragalus than Plagiolophus. The calcaneum is semirectangular in shape but slightly wider on its rear end. The cuboid bone is high and narrow, similar to that of Anchitherium.

Most species of Palaeotherium have three-toed hindlimbs and forelimbs, in contrast to earlier palaeotheres that have four-toed forelimbs and three-toed hindlimbs. P. eocaenum might have had a tetradactyl forelimb, as indicated by a manus that has been tentatively assigned to it. Palaeotherium differs from Plagiolophus in its long and narrow carpals and in its metacarpal bones, which are close in length to each other and develop into wide ungual phalanges. The tridactyl foot morphology with all three digits being functional suggests digitigrade locomotion.

Palaeotherium shows an exceptional amount of variation in the shape of its third metacarpal and its manus dimensions. P. curtum has very robust forelimb bones including a short and stocky manus, which suggests that it was stocky in build. P. magnum and P. crassum resemble tapirs, especially the mountain tapir (Tapirus pinchaque), in the build of their forelimbs. P. magnum has less slender radii and metacarpals compared to those of P. crassum and is therefore comparable to those of modern tapirs. P. medium, along with Plagiolophus, appear to be the most cursorial palaeotheres due to their elongated and gracile metacarpals. P. medium has a more unique foot morphology compared to other Palaeotherium species due to narrower and higher feet and longer metapodial bones. The cursorial adaptations of P. medium is further supported by the morphology of the humerus. The middle metatarsal bone is larger and more robust than the others. The fourth toe of P. magnum appears slightly arched and is slightly longer than the second toe.

=== Size ===
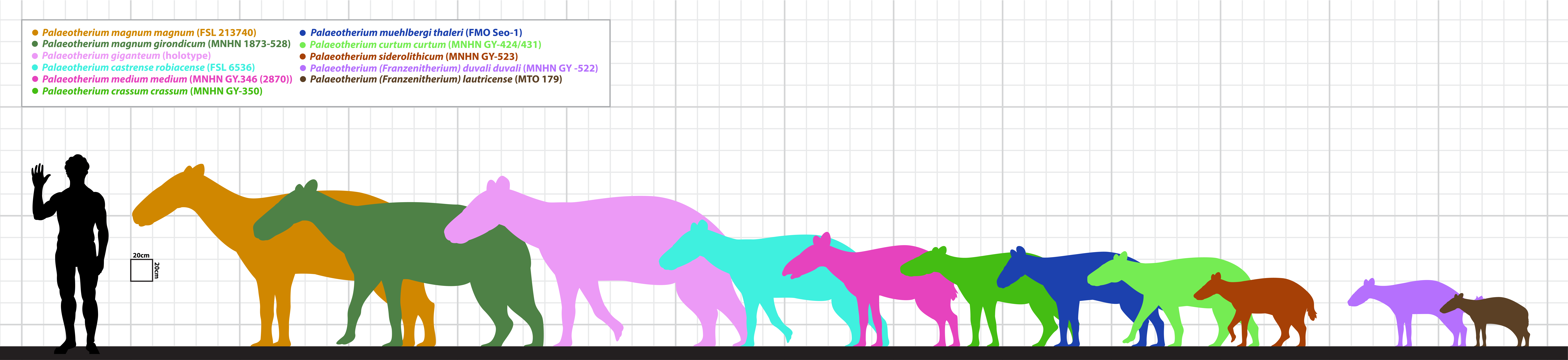
Estimated Palaeotherium species size comparisons based on known fossil specimens

Palaeotherium includes species of various sizes that range in skull base length from 150 to 520 mm (5.9 to 20.5 in). The length of the tooth row from P^{2} to M^{3} ranges from 64 mm (2.5 in) in the smallest species, P. lautricense, to 217 mm (8.5 in) in the largest species, P. giganteum. P. magnum, which was previously considered the largest species, is close to P. giganteum in size with one tooth row measuring 208.6 mm (8.21 in). P. medium is estimated to be the size of a subadult South American tapir (Tapirus terrestris), larger than the roe deer-sized Plagiolophus minor. The P. magnum Mormoiron skeleton demonstrates that individuals could have reached approximately 1.3 m (4 ft 3 in) in shoulder height and 2.52 m (8 ft 3 in) in length. Additionally, its head and neck together measure 1.04 m (3 ft 5 in), and its forelimb (humerus to hoof) also measures 1.04 m (3 ft 5 in) in length.

In 2015, Remy calculated the body mass of several Eocene European perissodactyl species based on a formula originally proposed by Christine M. Janis in 1990. He estimated that the small species P. lautricense could have weighed just 36 kg (79 lb). P. siderolithicum could have had an average weight of around 61 kg (134 lb). P. aff. ruetimeyeri could have had a larger body mass of 196 kg (432 lb) while P. pomeli was estimated at 206 kg (454 lb). P. castrense robiacense was estimated to be much heavier, at 447 kg (985 lb). According to Piere Perales-Gogenola et al. in 2022, the largest species P. giganteum could have had a body weight over 700 kg (1,500 lb). MacLaren and Naewelaerts proposed a somewhat lower weight estimate of 240.3 kg (530 lb) for the large species P. magnum.

=== Footprints ===
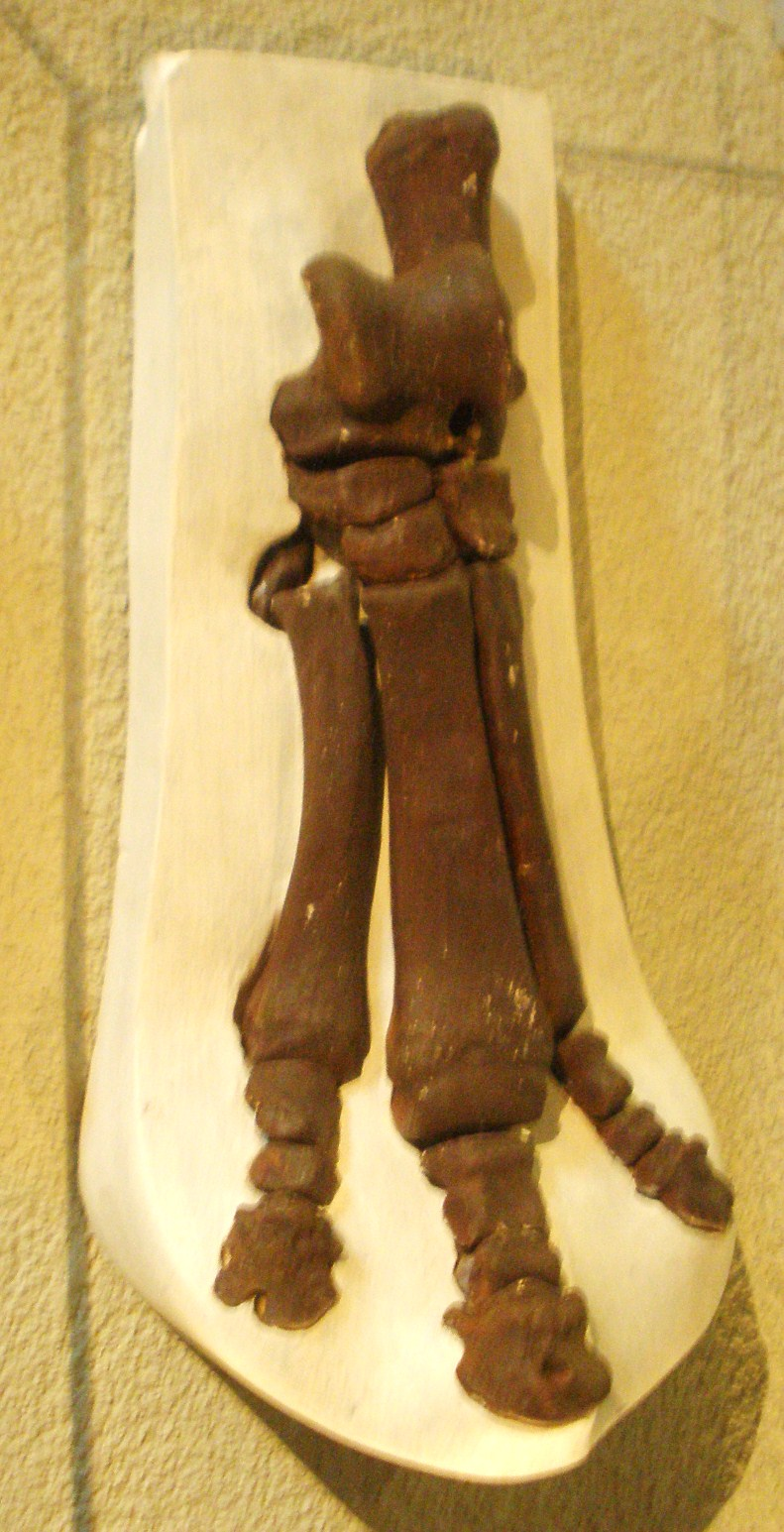
Front foot of P. crassum, Naturalis Biodiversity Center

Several types of tracks have been suggested to belong to Palaeotherium, among them the ichnogenus Palaeotheriipus that was named by the palaeontologist Paul Ellenberger in 1980 based on tracks from lacustrine limestones in the department of Gard in France. Ellenberger suggested that the ichnogenus most closely corresponds to P. medium or P. cf. crassum. The ichnogenus is diagnosed as a very short and tridactyl footprint in which the outer digits (II and IV) are shallow the middle digit (digit III) is more deeply impressed. It differs from another palaeothere ichnogenus, Plagiolophustipus, which was suggested to have been made by Plagiolophus, by the presence of smaller and broader digit impressions. Lophiopus, possibly produced by Lophiodon or Plagiolophus, differs by smaller digit impressions that are more widely splaced, while Rhinoceripeda, attributed to the Rhinocerotidae, is an oval-shaped footprint with three or five digits. Palaeotheriipus is known from both France and Iran, whereas Plagiolophustipus is currently known from Spain.

Two ichnospecies of Palaeotheriipus have been named. The type ichnospecies is Palaeotheriipus similimedius and based on the French material. These footprints are wider (140 mm (5.5 in)) than long (115 mm (4.5 in)), with fingers that diverge widely from each other at angles of at least 50°. The hoof of finger III appears to be wider than those of the outer toes. Ellenberger suggested that the ichnospecies most closely corresponds with either P. medium euzetense or P. medium perrealense. A second ichnospecies, P. sarjeanti, was described from eastern Iran and opens the possibility that palaeotheres could have extended in geographical range to the region by the middle to late Eocene. It was named in honor of the ichnologist William A. S. Sarjeant and is diagnosed as showing a relatively round middle digit that is broader and longer than the outer digits. The manus is less elongated than the pes. Additional footprints from the d'Apt-Forcalquier basin in France, dated to the middle Eocene and described by G. Bessonat et al. in 1969, are recorded to be larger than the footprints of P. similimedius. They have been suggested to be produced by the species P. magnum.

== Palaeobiology ==
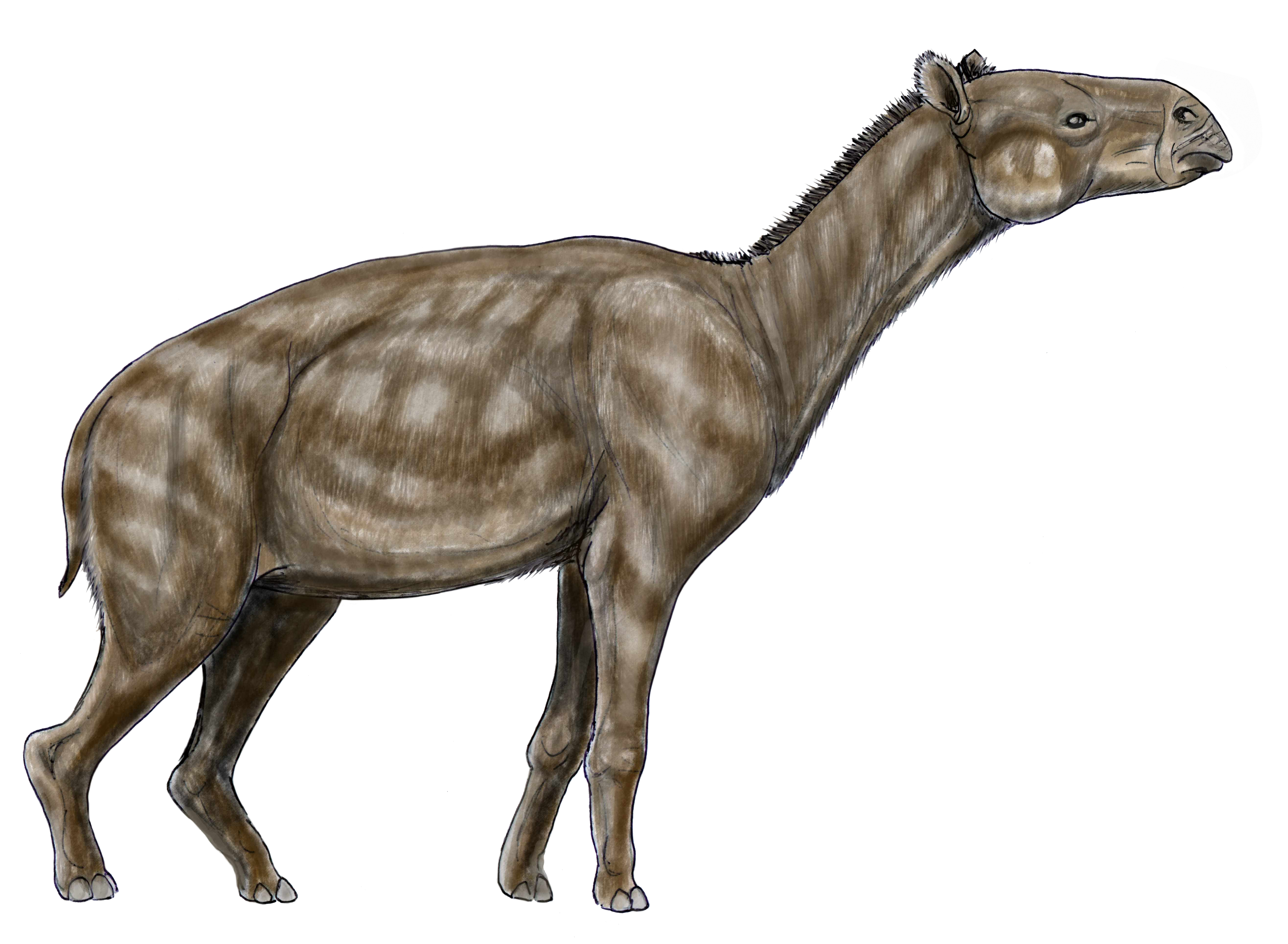
Restorations of P. magnum (left) and P. medium (right) based on skeletal evidence

Palaeotherium species vary substantially in size, morphology, and build. The skeletons of P. magnum, P. curtum, and P. crassum were relatively robust, while that of P. medium was more gracile, suggesting increased cursoriality. The evolutionary history of palaeotheres might have emphasized the sense of smell rather than sight or hearing, evident by the smaller orbits and the apparent lack of a derived auditory system. A well-developed sense of smell could have allowed palaeotheres to keep track of their herds, implying gregarious behaviours. The wide diversity of palaeothere forelimb morphologies attests to different degrees of cursoriality in separate species. They generally had smaller hindlimbs compared to forelimbs, suggesting less tendencies towards cursoriality due to being adapted to closed and stable environments. In 2000, Giuseppe Santi proposed that Palaeotherium could have been able to stand on its hind legs to reach high plants. P. magnum may have been able to browse on plants at over 2 m (6 ft 7 in) when quadrupedal; when on its hind legs, it could have reached up to 3 m (9.8 ft) or even 3.5 m (11 ft) in height. However, Jerry J. Hooker argued that there is no evidence for such facultative bipedalism in P. magnum unlike in the contemporary artiodactyl Anoplotherium. The long neck of P. magnum suggests that it might have browsed on higher plants and/or drank water from below. Palaeotherium was amongst the largest mammals to inhabit Europe during the middle to late Eocene, with only a few contemporary mammalian groups such as lophiodonts, anoplotheriids, and other palaeotheres reaching similar or larger body sizes.

According to Sandra Engels in a conference paper, both Palaeotherium and Plagiolophus have dentitions capable of processing harder items such as hard fruits, while their predecessors, such as Hyracotherium and Propalaeotherium, were adapted to softer food. Unlike in equids and basal equoids, the molars of later palaeotheres serve dual purposes of shearing food on the buccal side followed by crushing it on the lingual side, an adaptation for broader herbivorous diets. The two derived genera have brachyodont (low-crowned) dentition, suggesting that both genera were mostly folivorous (leaf-eating) and did not have frugivorous (fruit-eating) tendencies, evident by the lower amounts of rounded cusps on their molars. While both genera may have incorporated some fruit into their diets, the higher lingual tooth wear in Plagiolophus indicates it ate more fruit than Palaeotherium. Because of their likely tendencies to browse on higher plants, evident by their long necks and the woodland environments they inhabited, it is unlikely that minerals, usually consumed from grazing on ground plants, significantly affected the tooth wear of either of these genera. The tooth wear in both genera could have been the result of chewing on fruit seeds. It is likely that Palaeotherium ate softer food such as younger leaves and fleshy fruit that may have had hard seeds while Plagiolophus leaned towards consuming tough food such as older leaves and harder fruit. The interpretation that Palaeotherium consumed more leaf and woody material and less fruit compared to Plagiolophus is supported by the two having somewhat different chewing functions and Palaeotherium being more efficient in shearing food.

== Palaeoecology ==
=== Middle Eocene ===
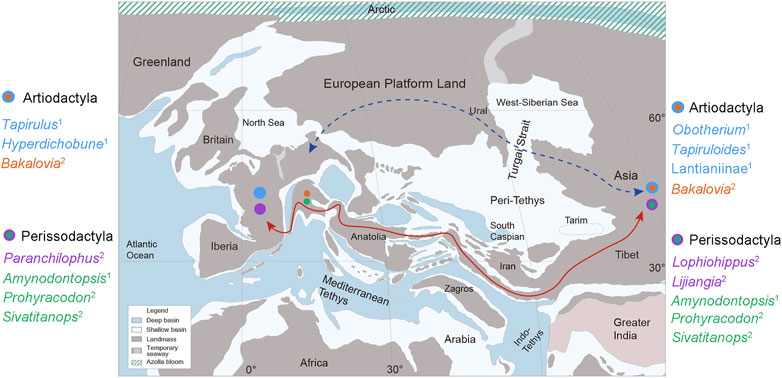
Palaeogeography of Europe and Asia during the middle Eocene with possible artiodactyl and perissodactyl dispersal routes.

For much of the Eocene, a hothouse climate with humid, tropical environments with consistently high precipitations prevailed. Modern mammalian orders including the Perissodactyla, Artiodactyla, and Primates (or the suborder Euprimates) appeared already by the early Eocene, diversifying rapidly and developing dentitions specialized for folivory. The omnivorous forms mostly either switched to folivorous diets or went extinct by the middle Eocene (47–37 million years ago) along with the archaic "condylarths". By the late Eocene (approx. 37–33 mya), most of the ungulate form dentitions shifted from bunodont (or rounded) cusps to cutting ridges (i.e. lophs) for folivorous diets.

Land connections between western Europe and North America were interrupted around 53 Ma. From the early Eocene up until the Grande Coupure extinction event (56–33.9 mya), western Eurasia was separated into three landmasses: western Europe (an archipelago), Balkanatolia (in-between the Paratethys Sea of the north and the Neotethys Ocean of the south), and eastern Eurasia. The Holarctic mammalian faunas of western Europe were therefore mostly isolated from other landmasses including Greenland, Africa, and eastern Eurasia, allowing for endemism to develop. Therefore, the European mammals of the late Eocene (MP17–MP20 of the Mammal Palaeogene zones) were mostly descendants of endemic middle Eocene groups.

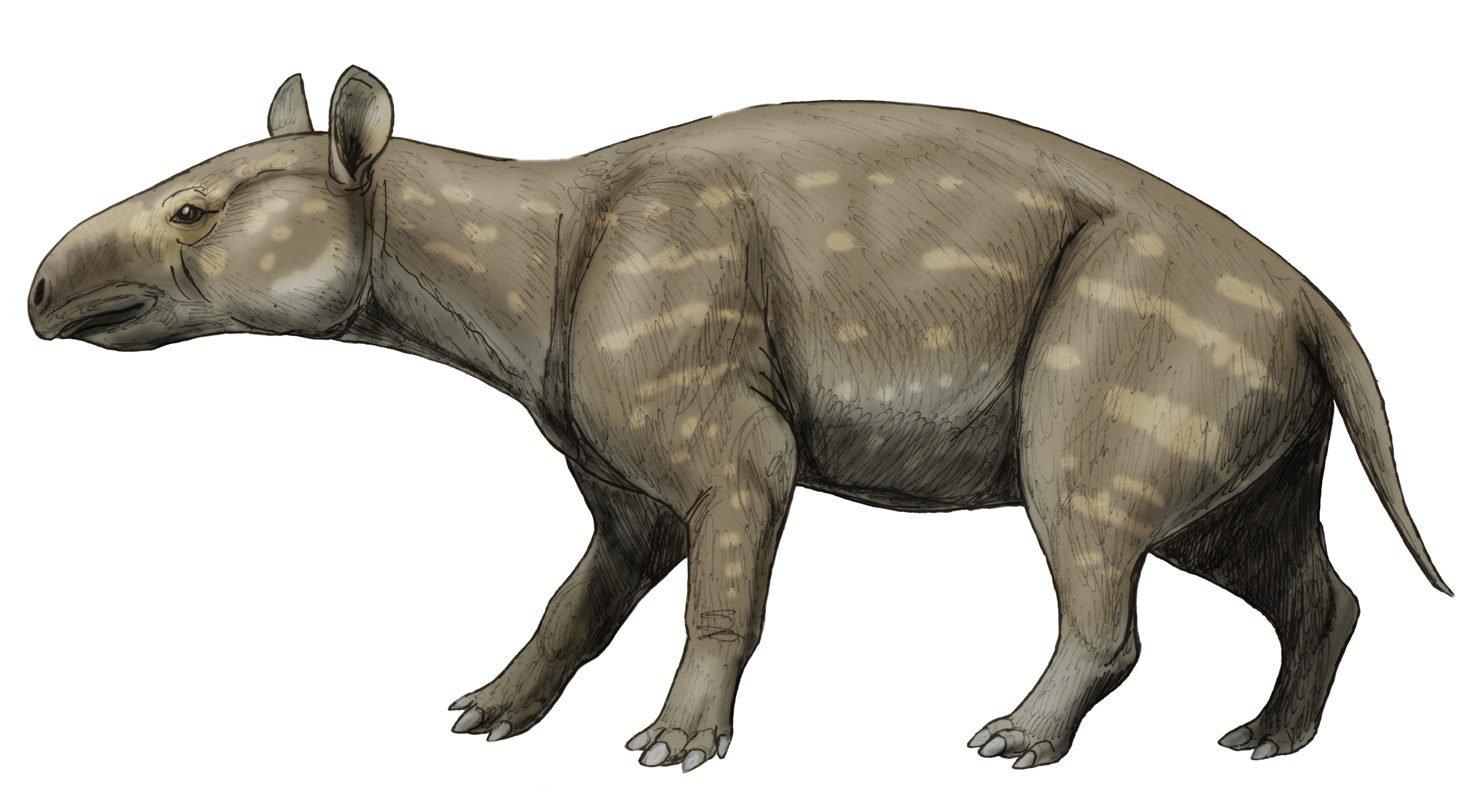
Restoration of Lophiodon, which coexisted with Palaeotherium in the middle to late Eocene

Palaeotherium made its first appearance with the species P. eocaenum in the MP13 unit. By then, it would have coexisted with perissodactyls (Palaeotheriidae, Lophiodontidae, and Hyrachyidae), non-endemic artiodactyls (Dichobunidae and Tapirulidae), endemic European artiodactyls (Choeropotamidae (possibly polyphyletic, however), Cebochoeridae, and Anoplotheriidae), and primates (Adapidae). Both the Amphimerycidae and Xiphodontidae made their first appearances by the level MP14. The stratigraphic ranges of the early species of Palaeotherium also overlapped with metatherians (Herpetotheriidae), cimolestans (Pantolestidae, Paroxyclaenidae), rodents (Ischyromyidae, Theridomyoidea, Gliridae), eulipotyphlans, bats, apatotherians, carnivoraformes (Miacidae), and hyaenodonts (Hyainailourinae, Proviverrinae). Other MP13-MP14 sites have also yielded fossils of turtles and crocodylomorphs, and MP13 sites are stratigraphically the latest to have yielded remains of the bird clades Gastornithidae and Palaeognathae.

The Egerkingen α + β locality, dating to MP14, records fossils of P. eocaenum, P. ruetimeyeri, and P. castrense castrense. Other mammal genera recorded within the locality include the herpetotheriid Amphiperatherium, ischyromyids Ailuravus and Plesiarctomys, pseudosciurid Treposciurus, omomyid Necrolemur, adapid Leptadapis, proviverrine Proviverra, palaeotheres (Propalaeotherium, Anchilophus, Lophiotherium, Plagiolophus), hyrachyid Chasmotherium, lophiodont Lophiodon, dichobunids Hyperdichobune and Mouillacitherium, choeropotamid Rhagatherium, anoplotheriid Catodontherium, amphimerycid Pseudamphimeryx, cebochoerid Cebochoerus, tapirulid Tapirulus, mixtotheriid Mixtotherium, and the xiphodonts Dichodon and Haplomeryx.

MP16 marks the first appearances of several species of Palaeotherium in the Central European region, namely P. castrense robiacense, P. pomeli, P. siderolithicum, and P. lautricense, some of which are exclusive to the unit (P. pomeli and P. lautricense) and one of which makes its latest appearance (P. castrense). The locality of Robiac in France records the likes of Palaeotherium aff. ruetimeyeri and all the aforementioned species from the region in MP16 along with the herpetotheriids Amphiperatherium and Peratherium, apatemyid Heterohyus, nyctithere Saturninia, omomyids (Necrolemur, Pseudoloris, and Microchoerus), adapid Adapis, ischyromyid Ailuravus, glirid Glamys, pseudosciurid Sciuroides, theridomyids Elfomys and Pseudoltinomys, hyaenodonts (Paracynohyaenodon, Paroxyaena, and Cynohyaenodon), carnivoraformes (Simamphicyon, Quercygale, and Paramiacis), cebochoerids Cebochoerus and Acotherulum, choeropotamids Choeropotamus and Haplobunodon, tapirulid Tapirulus, anoplotheriids (Dacrytherium, Catodontherium, and Robiatherium, dichobunid Mouillacitherium, robiacinid Robiacina, xiphodonts (Xiphodon, Dichodon, Haplomeryx), amphimerycid Pseudamphimeryx, lophiodont Lophiodon, hyrachyid Chasmotherium, and other palaeotheres (Plagiolophus, Leptolophus, Anchilophus, Metanchilophus, Lophiotherium, Pachynolophus, Eurohippus).

MP16 also records two species that are restricted to the unit, P. llamaquiquense and P. giganteum, both of which were endemic to the Iberian region. MP17 marks the restricted appearance of another Iberian endemic species P. crusafonti. The endemic species of Palaeotherium were amongst the many taxa of palaeotheres only known from the Iberian region. P. giganteum is recorded from the Spanish locality of Mazaterón along with the testudines Hadrianus and Neochelys, alligatoroid Diplocynodon, baurusuchid Iberosuchus, adapoid Mazateronodon, omomyid Pseudoloris, pseudosciurid Sciuroides, theridomyids Pseudoltinomys and Remys, hyaenodont Proviverra, anoplotheriids (Duerotherium and cf. Dacrytherium), xiphodonts (cf. Dichodon), and other palaeotheres (Paranchilophus, Plagiolophus, Leptolophus, Cantabrotherium, Franzenium, and Iberolophus).

After MP16, a faunal turnover occurred, marking the disappearances of the lophiodonts and European hyrachyids as well as the extinctions of all European crocodylomorphs except for the alligatoroid Diplocynodon. The causes of the faunal turnover have been attributed to a shift from humid and highly tropical environments to drier and more temperate forests with open areas and more abrasive vegetation. The surviving herbivorous faunas shifted their dentitions and dietary strategies accordingly to adapt to abrasive and seasonal vegetation. However, the environments were still subhumid and covered by subtropical evergreen forests. The Palaeotheriidae was the sole remaining European perissodactyl group, and frugivorous-folivorous or purely folivorous artiodactyls became the dominant group in western Europe.

=== Late Eocene ===
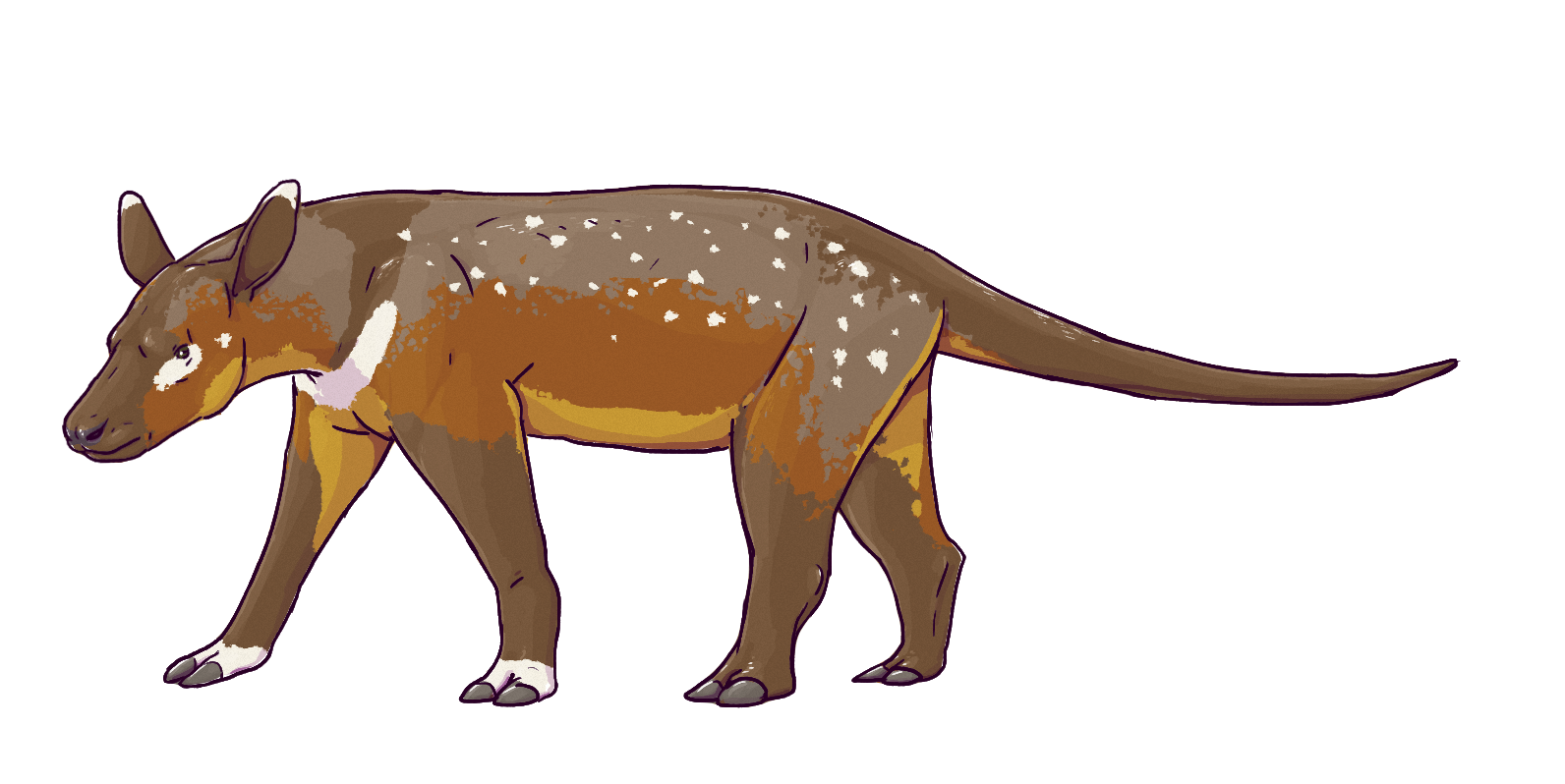
Reconstruction of Anoplotherium, a contemporary large ungulate endemic to western Europe in the late Eocene

The late Eocene MP17 unit marks the first appearances of several species of Palaeotherium, namely P. magnum, P. medium, P. curtum, P. crassum, P. duvali, and P. muehlbergi. The temporal range of P. siderolithicum, first known in MP16, continued up to MP19, and P. renevieri made its first and only appearance in MP19. Some other species extended in temporal range up to MP19 (P. duvali, P. crassum) while some others lasted up to MP20 (P. magnum, P. curtum, P. muehlbergi). By the late Eocene, the latest species of Palaeotherium were widespread throughout western Europe, including what is now Portugal, Spain, France, Switzerland, Germany, and the United Kingdom. Additionally, the genus is known from as far east as the Thrace Basin of Greece in the eastern European region in the middle to late Eocene. The faunas of eastern Europe vastly differed from those of western Europe despite the presence of Palaeotherium in both regions. It is possible that Palaeotherium was distributed as far east as eastern Iran, depending on whether the footprints are attributable to it. The presence of Palaeotherium in eastern Europe suggests periodic connectivity between Balkanatolia and other Eurasian regions.

Within the late Eocene, the Cainotheriidae and derived members of the Anoplotheriinae both made their first appearances by MP18. Also, several migrant mammal groups had reached western Europe by MP17a-MP18, namely the Anthracotheriidae, Hyaenodontinae, and Amphicyonidae. In addition to snakes, frogs, and salamandrids, rich assemblage of lizards are known in western Europe as well from MP16–MP20, representing the Iguanidae, Lacertidae, Gekkonidae, Agamidae, Scincidae, Helodermatidae, and Varanoidea, most of which were able to thrive in the warm temperatures of western Europe.

The MP18 locality of La Débruge in France holds fossil records of multiple species of Palaeotherium, namely P. curtum villerealense, P. duvali duvali, P. muehlbergi thaleri, P. medium perrealense, P. crassum robustum, and P. magnum girondicum. The locality indicates that the multiple subspecies of Palaeotherium coexisted with the herpetotheriid Peratherium, theridomyids Blainvillimys and Theridomys, ischyromyid Plesiarctomys, glirid Glamys, hyaenodonts Hyaenodon and Pterodon, amphicyonid Cynodictis, palaeotheres Plagiolophus and Anchilophus, dichobunid Dichobune, choeropotamid Choeropotamus, cebochoerids Cebochoerus and Acotherulum, anoplotheriids (Anoplotherium, Diplobune, and Dacrytherium), tapirulid Tapirulus, xiphodonts Xiphodon and Dichodon, cainothere Oxacron, amphimerycid Amphimeryx, and the anthracothere Elomeryx.

== Extinction ==
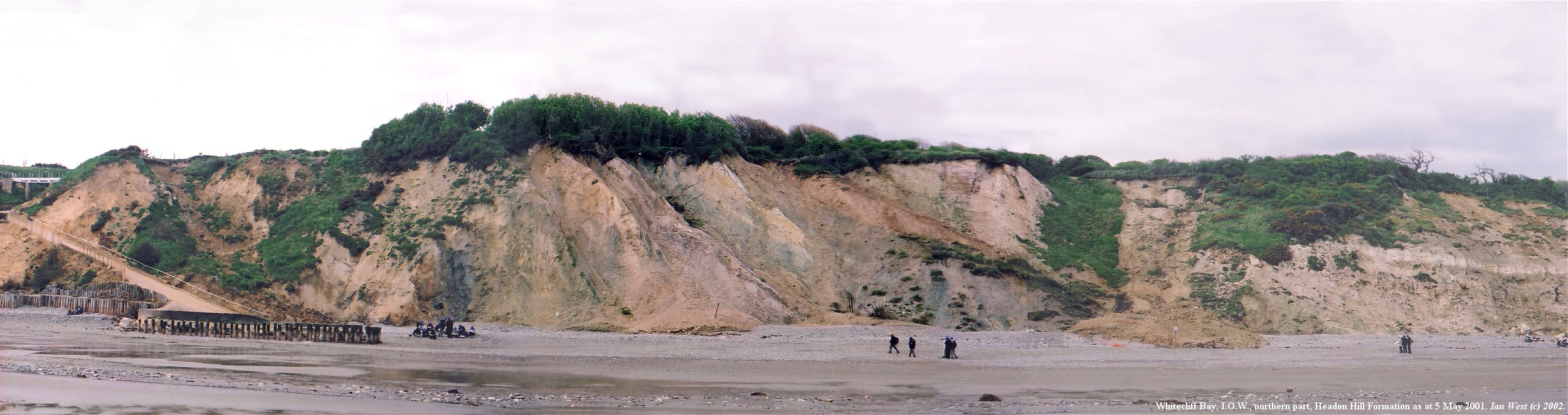
A panorama of the Headon Hill Formation in the Isle of Wight, from which Palaeotherium material has been collected. The stratigraphy of it and the Bouldnor Formation led to better understandings of faunal chronologies from the Late Eocene up to the Grande Coupure.

The Grande Coupure event during the latest Eocene to earliest Oligocene (MP20-MP21) is one of the largest and most abrupt faunal turnovers in the Cenozoic of Western Europe and coincident with climate forcing events of cooler and more seasonal climates. The event led to the extinction of 60% of western European mammalian lineages, which were subsequently replaced by Asian immigrants. The Grande Coupure is often dated directly to the Eocene-Oligocene boundary at 33.9 Ma, although some estimate that the event began slightly later, at 33.6–33.4 mya. The event occurred during or after the Eocene-Oligocene transition, an abrupt shift from a hot greenhouse world that characterised much of the Palaeogene to a coolhouse/icehouse world from the early Oligocene onwards. The massive drop in temperatures results from the first major expansion of the Antarctic ice sheets that caused drastic pCO_{2} decreases and an estimated drop of ~70 m (230 ft) in sea level.

Many palaeontologists agree that glaciation and the resulting drops in sea level allowed for increased migrations between Balkanatolia and western Europe. The Turgai Strait, which once separated much of Europe from Asia, is often proposed as the main European seaway barrier prior to the Grande Coupure, but some researchers challenged this perception recently, arguing that it completely receded already 37 Ma, long before the Eocene-Oligocene transition. In 2022, Alexis Licht et al. suggested that the Grande Coupure could have possibly been synchronous with the Oi-1 glaciation (33.5 Ma), which records a decline in atmospheric CO_{2}, boosting the Antarctic glaciation that already started by the Eocene-Oligocene transition.

The Grande Coupure event marked a large faunal turnover marking the arrivals of anthracotheres, entelodonts, ruminants (Gelocidae, Lophiomerycidae), rhinocerotoids (Rhinocerotidae, Amynodontidae, Eggysodontidae), carnivorans (later Amphicyonidae, Amphicynodontidae, Nimravidae, and Ursidae), eastern Eurasian rodents (Eomyidae, Cricetidae, and Castoridae), and eulipotyphlans (Erinaceidae).

The MP20 unit, the last before the Grande Coupure, marks the last appearances of most species of Palaeotherium, namely P. magnum, P. curtum, and P. muehlbergi. P. medium survived the Grande Coupure event based on its appearance at MP21, making it the last representative of its genus before its extinction. The extinction and faunal turnover devastated many of the endemic faunas of western Europe by driving many mammalian genera to extinction, the causes being attributed to interactions with immigrant faunas (competition, predations), environmental changes from cooling climates, or some combination of the two.

Researchers have proposed theories as to why both P. medium and Plagiolophus minor survived the Grande Coupure event up to the early Oligocene whereas other species went extinct. Santi proposed that the dentition and cranial musculature of Palaeotherium were generally unsuited for the closed habitat turnovers caused by aridification and expansion of more open habitats, therefore being unable to adapt to the environmental changes. He also suggested that its poorer sight and hearing senses plus slow locomotion could have also made it more vulnerable to immigrant carnivores. The researcher then explained that P. medium could have survived longer than the other species of Palaeotherium because of its cursorial nature, with MacLaren and Nauwelaerts similarly stating that Plagiolophus minor was more well-suited to adapt to open and drier habitats and immigrant predators than its relatives because of its smaller size and cursorial nature. Sarah C. Joomun et al. determined that certain faunas may have arrived later and therefore may not have played roles in the extinctions. They concluded that climate change, which led to increased seasonality and changes in plant food availability, caused certain palaeotheres and artiodactyls to become unable to adapt to the major changes and go extinct.
