= Jens Lorenz Franzen =

German paleontologist (1937–2018)

Jens Lorenz Franzen (27 April 1937 – 21 November 2018) was a German paleontologist. He was the head of Paleoanthropology and Quaternary at Naturmuseum Senckenberg in Frankfurt and participated in fossil excavation in Germany. He worked with scientific excavations and discovered many previously unknown fossil mammal species.

== Career ==
Franzen was born in Bremen in 1937.

From 1968 to 1969 Franzen was a research assistant at the Geological-Paleontological Institute of the Albert-Ludwigs-University Freiburg and was a research assistant from 1969 to 1970. From 1973 to 1984, Franzen protested with other members of the scientific community against a landfill near the Messel pit in Darmstadt.

In 1987, Franzen worked as a scientific advisor in Messel. From 1977 to 2000, he was curator and head of paleoanthropology at the Senckenberg research institute in Frankfurt am Main from 1982 to 1999 and led the head of the quaternary paleontology department in 2000. He was the First Chairman of the Science Committee of the Senckenberg Research Institute from 1992 to 2000 and was a member of the Board of Directors of the Senckenberg Natural Science Society. He retired September 2000 and volunteered at the Senckenberg Research Institute as well as the Geosciences Department of the Natural History Museum in Basel.

In 1998 he won the Friedrich von Alberti Prize for his studies in human history as well as his research and conservation of the UNESCO World Heritage Site of the Messel pit. In 2009 he was one of the authors of the first description of the fossil primate Darwinius.

== Studies ==
Franzen dealt with paleogenic equidae, the primates from Messel, as well as the Eocene mammals from Eckfeld during the late Miocene. He studied the mammalian chronology of the European Eocene and Upper Miocene.

Franzen participated in the excavation at a fossil site near Darmstadt in Hesse. Franzen also carried out paleontological and paleoanthropological studies in Morocco (1971), Libya (1972), Greece (1963, 1975) and Mexico (1991–1992).

Franzen was a member of numerous societies including the Society of Vertebrate Paleontology, Paleontological Society, Upper Rhine Geological Association, Natural Research Society Freiburg, Archaeological Society of Hesse, Messel Museum Association and the Dinotherium-Museum Eppelsheim Association.

== Death ==
Franzen died at the age of 81 on 21 November 2018, in Freiburg im Breisgau.

== Honors ==
Several fossil species have been named in honor of Franzen. In the field of the genera and subgenera Franzenium ng ( Casanovas-Cladellas & Santafé-Llopis, 1989) and Franzenitherium n.subg. ( Remy, JA, 1992). In addition, the newly discovered species Palaeotherium franzeni n.sp. ( Casanovas-Cladellas, 1980), Masillabune franzeni n.sp. Erfurt & Haubold, 1989, Neochelys franzeni n.sp. ( Schleich, 1993) and Tachypteron franzeni n.sp. ( Stork, Sigé & Habersetzer, 2002)

== Publications ==
- "New mammal finds from the Eocene of Eckfelder Maares near Manderscheid (Eifel)". In: Mainz Natural Science. Arch. Supplement 16, Mainz 1994, pp. 189–211.
- "The Equoidea of the European Central Eocene". In: Hallesches Jb. Geowiss. Volume 17, Halle 1995, pp. 31–45.
- "A coprolite as a treat. The seventh primate find from Messel". In: Natur u. Museum. Volume 127, No. 2, Frankfurt am Main 1997, pp. 46–53.
- "The sixth Messel Primate (Mammalia, Primates, Notharctidae, Cercamoniinae)". In: Senckenbergiana lethaea. Volume 80, Frankfurt am Main 2000, pp. 289–303.
- "First fossil primates from the Eckfeld Maar, Middle Eocene (Eifel, Germany)". In: Eclogae geologicae Helvetiae. Volume 97, Basel 2004, pp. 213–220.
- The Dawn of Dawn. Origin and Evolution of Horses. Spectrum Academic Publishing House (Elsevier), Heidelberg 2007, ISBN 978-3-8274-1680-3.

== Works ==
=== New genera ===
- Pseudopalaeotherium Franzen, 1972
- Messelobunodon Franzen, 1981
- Hallensia Franzen & Haubold, 1986
- Neufferia Franzen, 1994
- Lutzia Franzen, 1994, pre-occupied by Lutzia Theobald, 1903, now valid Herbertlutzius Franzen, 2009
- Godinotia Franzen, 2000
- Eurohippus Franzen, 2006
- Darwinius Franzen et al., 2009

=== New species ===
- Palaeotherium pomeli Franzen, 1968
- Pseudopalaeotherium longirostratum Franzen, 1972
- Messelobunodon schaeferi Franzen, 1981
- Messelobunodon ceciliensis Franzen & Krumbiegel, 1980
- Europolemur koenigswaldi Franzen, 1987
- Hallensia matthesi Franzen & Haubold 1986
- Hallensia parisiensis Franzen, 1990
- Neufferia manderscheidi Franzen, 1994
- Lutzia eckfeldensis Franzen, 1994
- Lophiotherium sondaari Franzen, 1999
- Europolemur kelleri Franzen, 2000
- Plesiosorex roosi Franzen, Fejfar & Storch, 2003

=== New subspecies ===
- Palaeotherium castrense robiacense Franzen, 1968
- Palaeotherium crassum robustum Franzen, 1968
- Palaeotherium muehlbergi praecursum Franzen, 1968
- Palaeotherium curtum villerealense Franzen, 1968
- Palaeotherium curtum frohnstettense Franzen, 1968
- Palaeotherium duvali priscum Franzen, 1968
