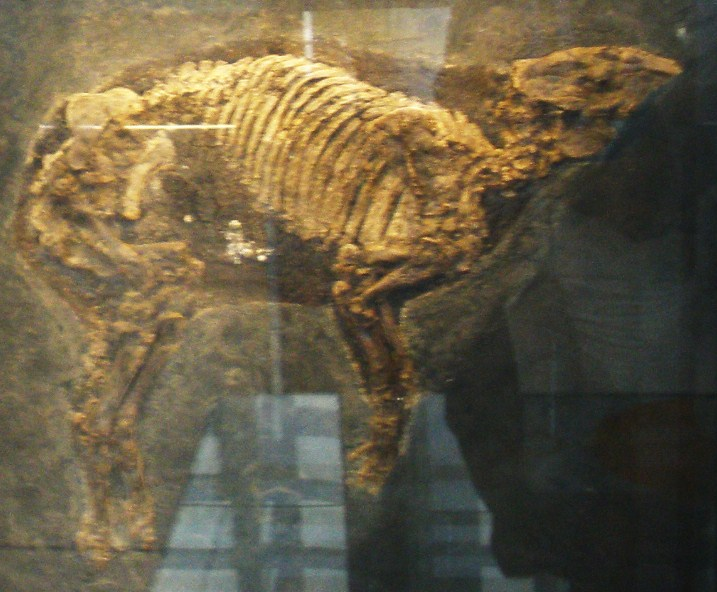
- Hallensia matthesi

Scientific classification
- Kingdom: Animalia
- Phylum: Chordata
- Class: Mammalia
- Order: Perissodactyla
- Genus: †Hallensia; Franzen and Haubold, 1986

= Hallensia =

Hallensia Temporal range: Early Eocene

Extinct genus of mammals

Hallensia is an extinct genus of perissodactyl.
