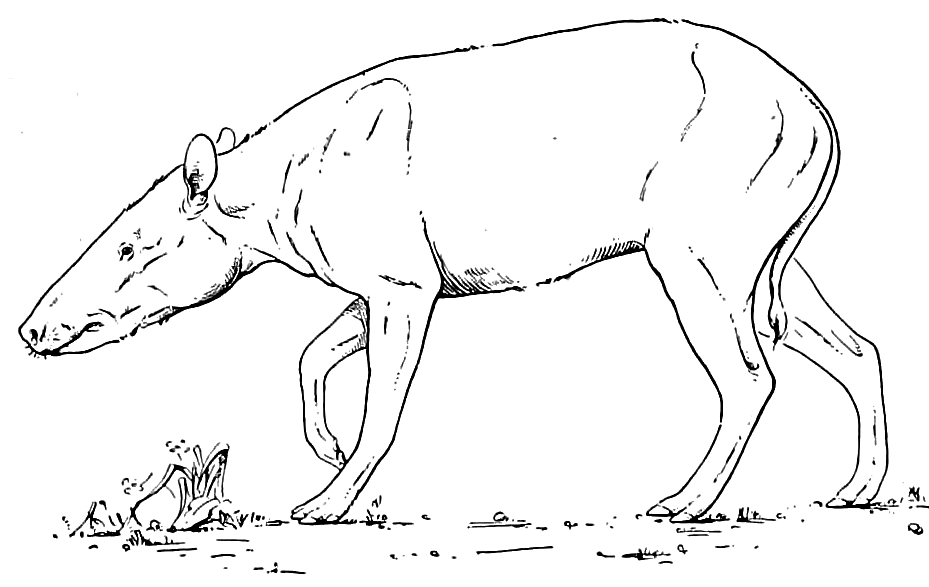
- Life reconstruction of Lambdotherium

Scientific classification
- Kingdom: Animalia
- Phylum: Chordata
- Class: Mammalia
- Infraclass: Placentalia
- Order: Perissodactyla
- Family: †Lambdotheriidae; Cope, 1889

Genera
- †Danjiangia; †Gobihippus?; †Lambdotherium; †Mesolambdolophus?

= Lambdotheriidae =

Lambdotheriidae Temporal range: Early Eocene

Extinct family of odd-toed ungulates

Lambdotheres are an extinct group of primitive perissodactyl (odd-toed ungulate) mammals belonging to the family Lambdotheriidae. Lambdotheres lived during the Early Eocene and were small animals, weighing less than 50 kilograms (110 lb).

Lambdotheres are traditionally interpreted, and generally recognized, as close relatives of brontotheres. Some researchers have alternatively proposed close relations to palaeotheres. The positions may not be mutually exclusive, since palaeotheres may be paraphyletic. Lambdotheres might alternatively form a paraphyletic grade of basal members of either group, rather than a monophyletic group in and of themselves.

== Classification ==
=== History ===
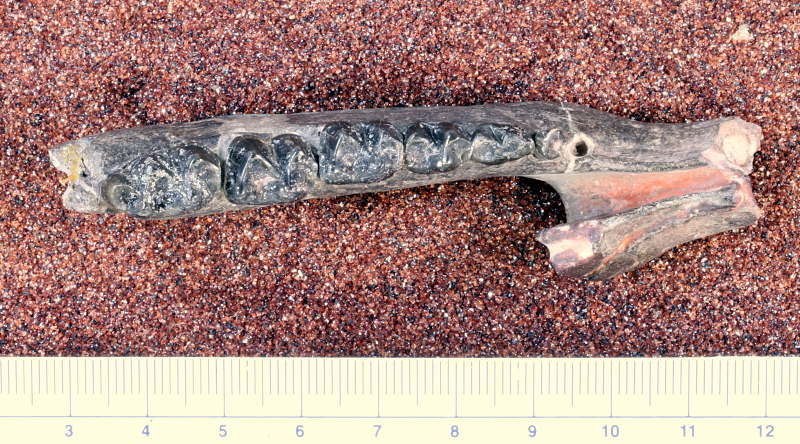
Fossil jaw of Lambdotherium

In 1880, Edward Drinker Cope described the genus Lambdotherium, which was interpreted as a primitive relative of the brontotheres. The family Lambdotheriidae was named by Cope in 1889. Cope intended the family to encompass not only Lambdotherium, but also all brontotheres that had "but a single internal cusp on the first (posterior) superior premolar". The presence of just a single cusp was used by Cope to distinguish Lambdotheriidae from "Menodontidae" (=Brontotheriidae). As understood by Cope, the family thus encompassed not only primitive forms but also some derived brontotheres, including Haplacodon (now considered a synonym of Megacerops).

In 1891, William Henry Flower and Richard Lydekker restricted Lambdotheriidae to only a selection of primitive forms. As used by Flower and Lydekker, Lambdotheriidae applied to Lambdotherium, the primitive brontothere Palaeosyops, and Limnohyops. Limnohyops has since been recognized as a synonym of Palaeosyops. In the subsequent years, several paleontologists used the name Palaeosyopidae or Palaeosyopinae for the same selection of genera.

In 1929, Henry Fairfield Osborn treated the lambdotheres as a subfamily (Lambdotheriinae) within Brontotheriidae. In 1945, George Gaylord Simpson also treated Lambdotheriinae as a subfamily in Brontotheriidae, as did Malcolm McKenna and Susan K. Bell in 1997. As used by Osborn and Simpson, the subfamily Lambdotheriinae included only Lambdotherium, with Palaeosyopinae (with Palaeosyops) made a separate subfamily. McKenna and Bell also classified Xenicohippus as a lambdothere; later studies have consistently classified Xenicohippus as an equoid, not a lambdothere.

=== Modern research ===
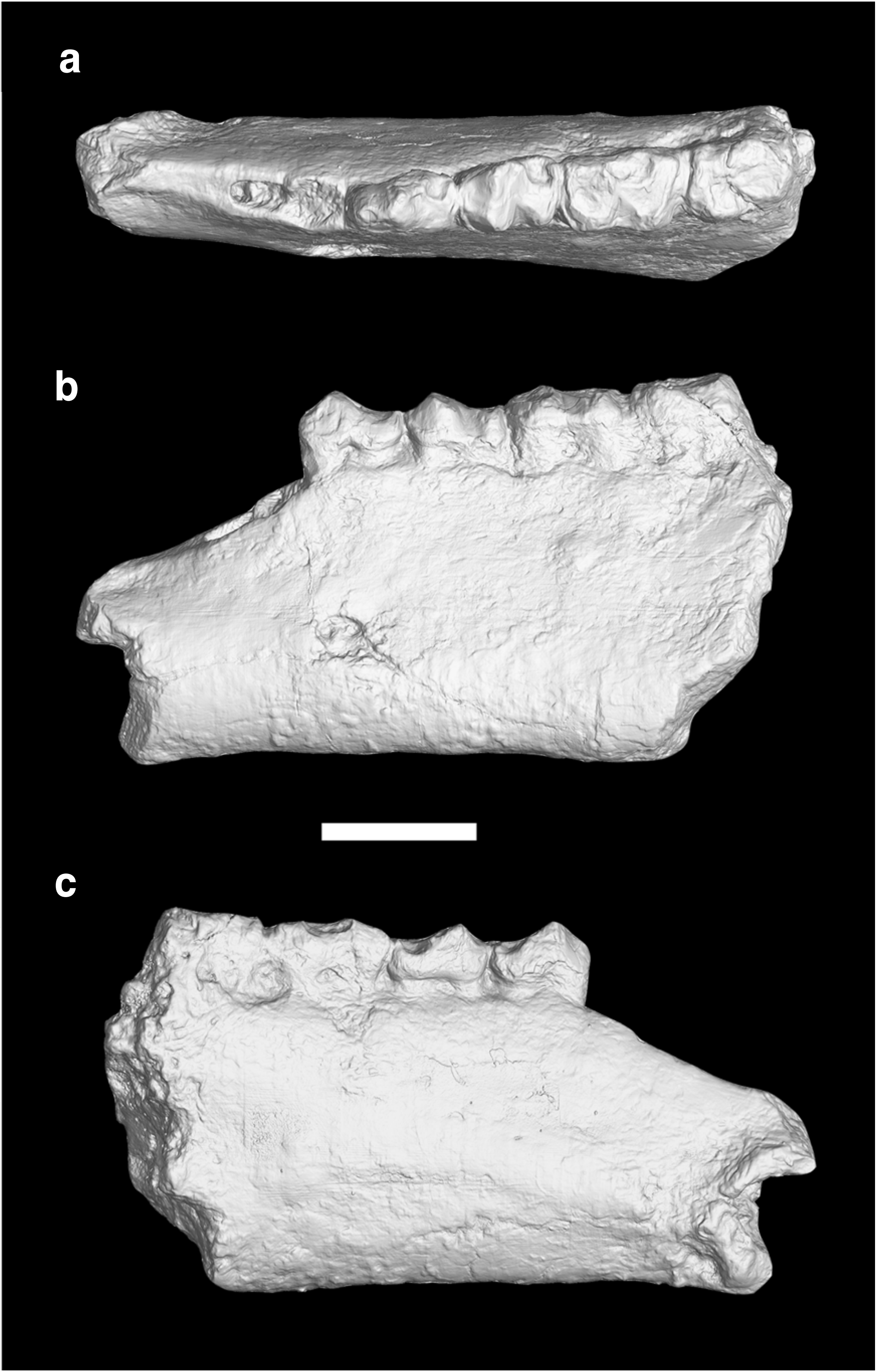
Fragmentary mandible of Danjiangia

Modern analyses have not reached a consensus on the position of lambdotheres or brontotheres. Unpublished research in the 1980s proposed that Lambdotherium was closer to palaeotheres (an extinct family of equoids) than to brontotheres, which led Bryn J. Mader to exlude the genus from his analyses and revisions of brontotheres in the 1980s and 1990s. In 1998, Mader noted that Lambdotherium bore some resemblance to equoids but treated it as Perissodactyla incertae sedis.

In 1995, Wang Yuan described the new genus Danjiangia, originally interpreted as a primitive chalicothere. In 1998, K. Christopher Beard noticed similarities between Danjiangia and Lambdotherium, and interpreted the two as sister taxa, and as possible sister taxa to brontotheres. In 2003, Jerry J. Hooker and Demberel Dashzeveg recovered Danjiangia and Lambdotherium as sister taxa, though their analysis did not include any true brontotheres.

In a 1999 phylogenetic analysis of basal perissodactyls, David J. Froehlich recovered Lambdotherium and Palaeosyops as sister taxa, and as basal relatives of palaeotheres. In 2004, Spencer G. Lucas and Luke T. Holbrook recovered Lambdotherium as a basal relative of palaeotheres, but not as the sister taxon of the basal brontothere Eotitanops, casting doubt on the status of Lambdotherium as a basal brontothere relative. Due to this confusion, Matthew C. Mihlbachler explicitly excluded Lambdotherium from Brontotheriidae in a major 2008 brontothere monograph. In his phylogenetic analysis, Mihlbachler nevertheless recovered Lambdotherium as the sister taxon of Brontotheriidae, and Danjiangia as the sister taxon of the Lambdotherium + Brontotheriidae clade.

Although sometimes recovered as paraphyletic, Lambdotheriidae still sees use as a family. Lambdotherium and Danjiangia are sometimes alternatively classified as basal members of Brontotheriidae, though they are normally excluded from the family. Whether they are close to brontotheres or basal palaeotheres is also not considered resolved. Palaeotheres are sometimes recovered as paraphyletic. If considered close to brontotheres, lambdotheres and brontotheres are sometimes grouped together under "Brontotherioidea" or "Titanotheriomorpha". In addition to Danjiangia and Lambdotherium, recent studies have identified potential additional lambdotheres. The genus Gobihippus, originally described as equoid, has been suggested to be a lambdothere or basal brontothere. "Propalaeotherium" sinense, which does not appear to belong to the genus Propalaeotherium, has similarities to Lambdotherium and may be another close relative. A 2026 analysis recovered the poorly known Mesolambdolophus as the sister taxon of brontotheres, closer than both Lambdotherium and Danjiangia.

Lambdotheres
Brontotheres
Palaeotheres (traditional)

Wang (1995)

- - Eotitanops
  - - - Propachynolophus
      - Lambdotherium
    - - Danjiangia
      - Eomoropus

Froehlich (1999)

- - Equidae
  - - Hallensia
    - - Hyracotherium
      - - Propachynolophus
        - - Pachynolophus
          - - - Lambdotherium
              - Palaeosyops
            - - Lophiotherium
              - - Propalaeotherium
                - - Plagiolophus
                  - - Anchilophus
                    - Palaeotherium

Lucas & Holbrook (2004)

- - Phenacodus
  - - Cardiolophus
    - Hyracotherium
    - - Eotitanops
      - - - - Eomoropus
            - Moropus
          - - Lophiodon
            - - Isectolophus
              - Heptodon
              - Tapiroidea
              - Rhinocerotoidea
    - - Lambdotherium
      - - Palaeotherium
        - Plagiolophus

Mihlbachler (2008)

- - Hyracotherium
  - - Pachynolophus
    - - Danjiangia
      - - Lambdotherium
        - Brontotheriidae
          - Eotitanops
          - - Palaeosyops
            - Brontotheriinae

Bai, Wang & Meng (2018)

- - Equidae
  - - Hyracotherium
    - - Protorohippus
      - - - Propachynolophus
          - - Lambdotherium
            - Danjiangia
            - "Propalaeotherium" sinense
            - Eotitanops
        - - Pachynolophus
          - - Ceratomorpha
            - - Isectolophidae
              - Ancylopoda

Tissier & Smith (2026)

- - Tapiromorpha
  - - - Systemodon tapirinum
      - "Xenicohippus" osborni
    - - "Xenicohippus" craspedotum
      - - Protorohippus venticolum
        - Bepitherium jordigusalbae
        - - "Propachynolophus" levei
          - "Cymbalophus" hookeri
        - - Eurohippus messelensis
          - - Propachynolophus gaudryi
            - - - Propalaeotherium voigti
                - Propalaeotherium isselanum
              - - - Pachynolophus eulaliensis
                  - Pachynolophus livinierensis
                - - Lambdotheirum popoagicum
                  - - Danjiangia pingi
                    - - Mesolambdolophus setoni
                      - - Palaeosyops paludosus
                        - Eotitanops borealis
              - Equidae
