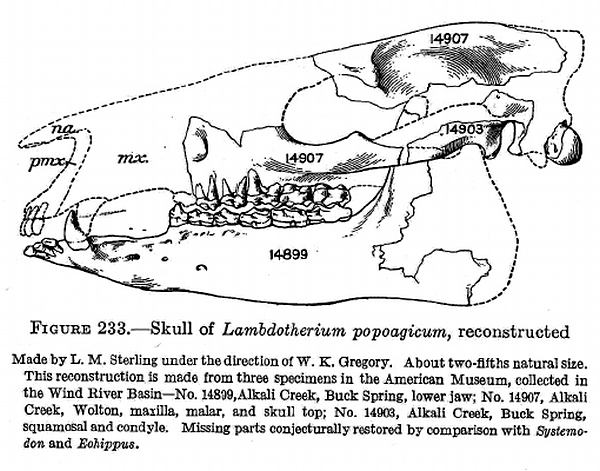
- Reconstruction of the skull of Lambdotherium popoagicum

Scientific classification
- Kingdom: Animalia
- Phylum: Chordata
- Class: Mammalia
- Infraclass: Placentalia
- Order: Perissodactyla
- Family: †Lambdotheriidae
- Genus: †Lambdotherium; Cope, 1880

Type species
- Lambdotherium popoagicum Cope, 1880

Species
- L. popoagicum Cope, 1880

Synonyms
- L. magnum Osborn, 1919; L. primavaeum Loomis, 1907; L. priscum Osborn, 1913; L. progressum Osborn, 1913

= Lambdotherium =

Lambdotherium Temporal range: Eocene 55.8–50.3 Ma

Extinct genus of mammals

Lambdotherium ("lambda beast") is a genus of North American perissodactyl from the lower Eocene. The genus is currently monospecific, containing only the species L. popoagicum. Lambdotherium is traditionally interpreted as a close relative of the brontotheres; some studies propose alternate placements, such as Lambdotherium being a primitive palaeothere or a close relative of that group.

== Taxonomy ==
Lambdotherium was a primitive perissodactyl mammal, traditionally interpreted as a close relative of brontotheres. When first discovered, Lambdotherium was interpreted as the earliest and most primitive brontothere, a hypothesis maintained by several later researchers. Several alternate positions have also been proposed; in the late 19th century, Edward Drinker Cope suggested that Lambdotherium belonged to its own family, Lambdotheriidae, alongside Palaeosyops. Cope placed this family in the perissodactyl clade Ancylopoda. Later, Cope classified Lambdotherium as a primitive chalicothere. Henry Fairfield Osborn proposed that Lambdotherium was closer to Equidae in 1897, but this proposal was refuted by William K. Gregory. In 2004, Lucas et al. recovered Lambdotherium as closer to palaeotheres than to brontotheres in a phylogenetic analysis.

Lambdotherium is still often classified as a close relative of brontotheres, potentially a sister taxon of Brontotheriidae or a very basal member of that family, though it is often noted to alternatively possibly be a palaeothere. Additional Lambdotherium-like mammals have been discovered since the late 20th century, most notably the Asian genus Danjiangia. Danjiangia is sometimes proposed as an alternative sister taxon of brontotheres, even closer than Lambdotherium, or as the sister taxon of Lambdotherium itself in a distinct Lambdotheriidae. Gobihippus, originally described as an Equoid, may also be a close relative of Lambdotherium and Danjiangia.

The name Lambdotherium is derived from the shape of the crests of the lower molars, while popoagicum is derived from the Popo Agie River, which is a tributary of the Wind River, close to where the fossils were found.

== Description ==
Lambdotherium was small compared to later perissodactyls, and was lightly built and likely adapted for fast movement.

=== Crania ===
==== Skull ====
The skull of Lambdotherium is dolichocephalic (elongated). The skull bears an enlarged sagittal crest, which meets with a sizable lambdoidal crest towards the back of the skull. The occiput in itself is tall and narrow. The shape of the rostrum is tubular, which widens greatly past the second premolar. The orbit rests above a gap in the first and second molars, and there is a small infraorbital foramen (hole below the eye socket) in the maxilla above the third premolar. The maxillary bone prevents the premaxillary bone from meeting with the nasal bone. The jaws are generally slender and elongated. In terms of proportions, the skull has been compared to Eohippus.

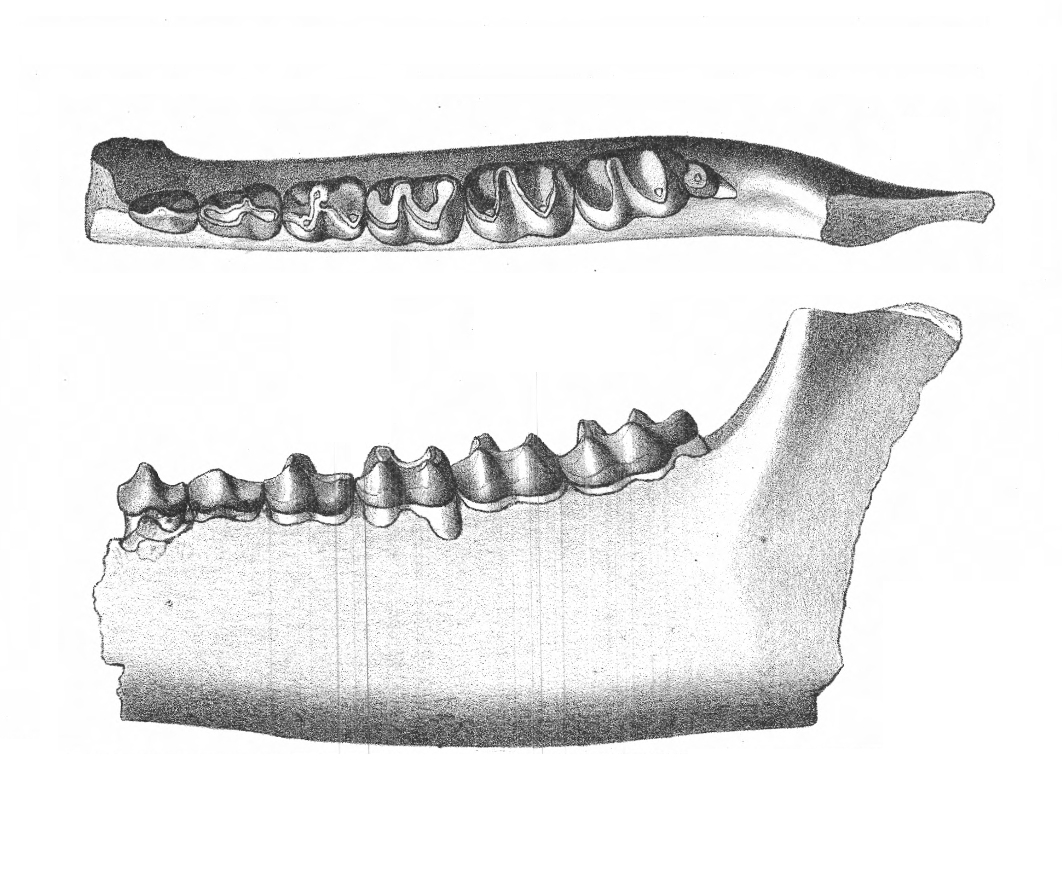
Lambdotherium, jaw of L. popoagicum (holotype AMNH 4863)

==== Dentition ====
Lambdotherium has chisel shaped incisors, which are shaped partly like a spatula and are separated from the canines by a diastema (gap).The incisors are arranged in a parabolic shape. Historically it had been assumed the first premolar wasn't present, though this idea has fallen out of favor with the discovery of the first premolar in some specimens, which is sharp, laterally compressed, and double rooted. The molars of Lambdotherium are all similar in shape and undifferentiated, with all of them having a V-shaped crest on the tooth. The crowns on the molars are low. The first lower premolar, unlike the upper premolar, is not present. The lower fourth premolar is shaped similarly to the molars, which are lophiodont. The enamel of the last molar is generally smooth and there is no cingulum.

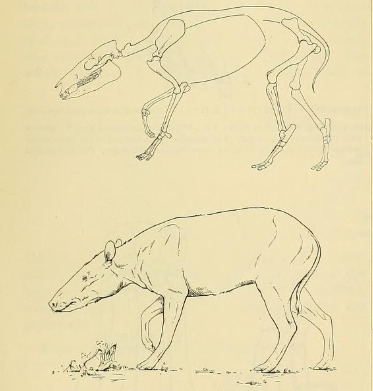
Skeletal and life reconstruction of Lambdotheirum by Erwin S. Christman

=== Appendicular skeleton ===
Lambdotherium is lightly built, and was likely cursorial in life, as the feet and limbs are adapted for running. The radius is 90% the size of the humerus, with the radius measuring about 103 mm (4.1 in). The scapula has a long neck, and the distal end of the humerus connects with the flattened articular surface of the ulna and radius.The olecranon process of the ulna is erect and shortened. There are 4 digits on the feet, with the median digit being the largest. The atlas vertebra assumes the typical perissodactyl form.

== Paleoenvironment ==
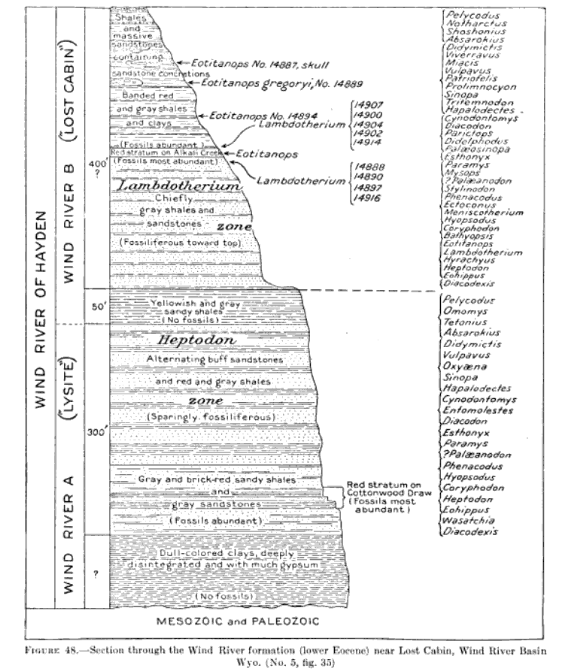
Stratigraphy of the Wind River Formation, with the presence of Lambdotherium serving as an indicator of a biostratigraphic zone.

=== Distribution ===
Found from the lower Eocene, Lambdotherium is known from many western North American fossil-bearing formations. Typically fossils are found in formations that are part of the Lost Cabin locality. Fossils of Lambdotherium have been found in the Wind River Basin, the Bighorn Basin, the Beaver Divide and Huerfano Park, as well as the Wasatch Formation.

=== Paleoecology ===
Lambdotherium lived alongside a multitude of other animals, including the primitive horse Eohippus, the oxyaenid Oxyaena, the phenacodont Phenacodus and the pantodont Coryphodon. Lambotherium also coexisted with omomyid primates. The environments Lambdotherium lived in were likely open habitats, interspersed with forests along water bodies. The flora of the region is speculated to have been similar to the flora of the Woolwich Formation in England, which preserves figs (Ficus), the locust tree (Robinia), the tulip tree (Liriodendron), and Grevillea. Direct fossils of plants from the Wasatch formation confirm the presence of Metasequoia and Averrhoites affinis. The environments Lambdotherium lived in were mostly tropical and subtropical in climate, which, in the case of the Wasatch formation, allowed Paleocene plant communities to persist into the Eocene.
