= Cymbalophus =

Cymbalophus Temporal range: Ypresian (early Eocene)

Scientific classification
- Kingdom: Animalia
- Phylum: Chordata
- Class: Mammalia
- Order: Perissodactyla
- Genus: †Cymbalophus; Hooker, 1984

Type species
- †Hyracotherium cuniculus Owen, 1842

Extinct genus of mammals

Cymbalophus is an extinct genus of perissodactyl from the early Eocene of Europe. The type species, C. cuniculus, was originally named as a species of Hyracotherium, though Hooker (1984) redescribed it as an early ceratomorph (the tapir and rhino relatives), naming the new genus Cymbalophus in the process. Later studies by the same author reversed his original conclusion, classifying it as a hippomorph (the horse relatives). Some studies by other paleontologists continue to support Cymbalophus as a ceratomorph (or, more broadly, a tapiromorph). Cymbalophus may be most closely related to Systemodon, another small perissodactyl originally considered a species of Hyracotherium.

Cymbalophus cuniculus occurs in England, France, and Belgium. "Pachynolophus" hookeri, a species from France, does not appear closely related to other Pachynolophus species, and it may represent a species of Cymbalophus instead.
