= Erwin S. Christman =

American paleo-artist and sculptor (1885–1921)

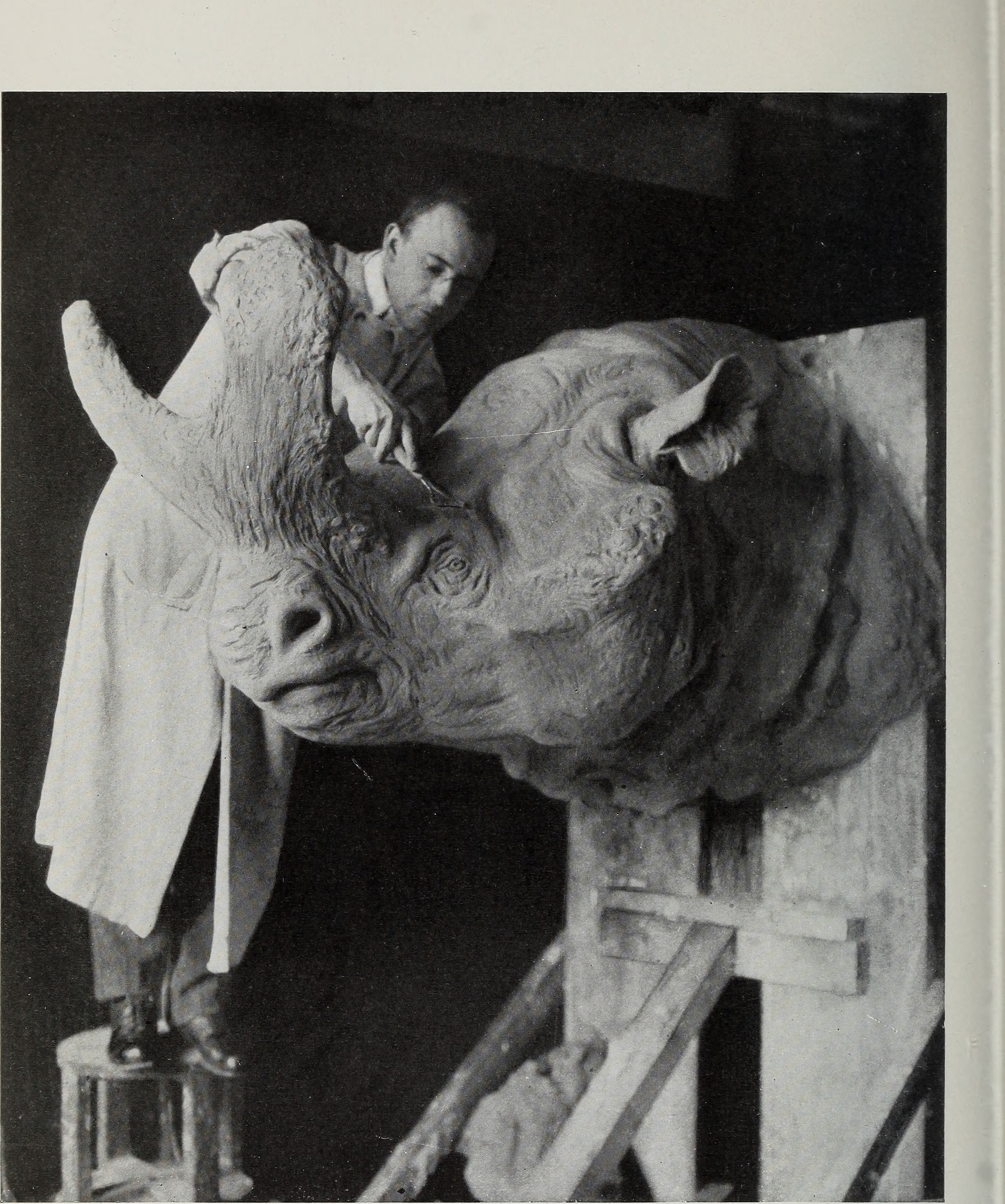
Erwin S. Christman
- Born: January 14, 1885; Clinton, New Jersey
- Died: November 14, 1921 (aged 36); New York City, New York
- Education: Art Students League, National Academy of Design
- Known for: Painting, sculpting

Erwin Sachem Christman (January 14, 1885 – November 14, 1921) was an American palaeoartist, known for his sculptures of Cenozoic mammals, skeletal reconstructions, and his work on the famous 1912 skeletal mount of Tyrannosaurus rex.

== Biography ==
=== Early life ===
Little is known of Christman's early life, aside from that he was born in Clinton, New Jersey on January 14, 1885. He studied at the Art Students League and the National Academy of Design, working under the supervision of palaeontologist Henry Fairfield Osborn.

=== Career ===
His first published illustrations were a series of illustrations of the holotype of Tyrannosaurus rex, published in 1906. In 1912, he produced a scale-model diorama for a planned Tyrannosaurus mount; this early version was shelved for its complexity. Subsequently, he provided skull diagrams for Barnum Brown's 1916 paper describing the hadrosaur Prosaurolophus maximus, a suite of reconstructions of the sauropod Camarasaurus lentus for Osborn and Charles Craig Mook's 1921 monograph, and several illustrations and sculptures of brontothere heads. Christman died on November 14, 1921, in New York City.

== Gallery ==
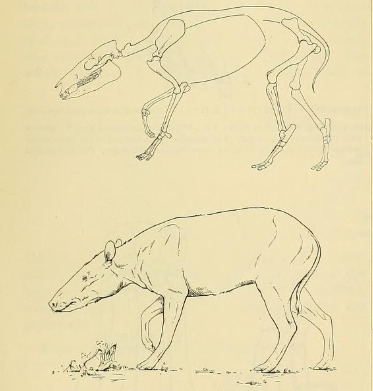
Skeletal and life reconstruction of Lambdotherium

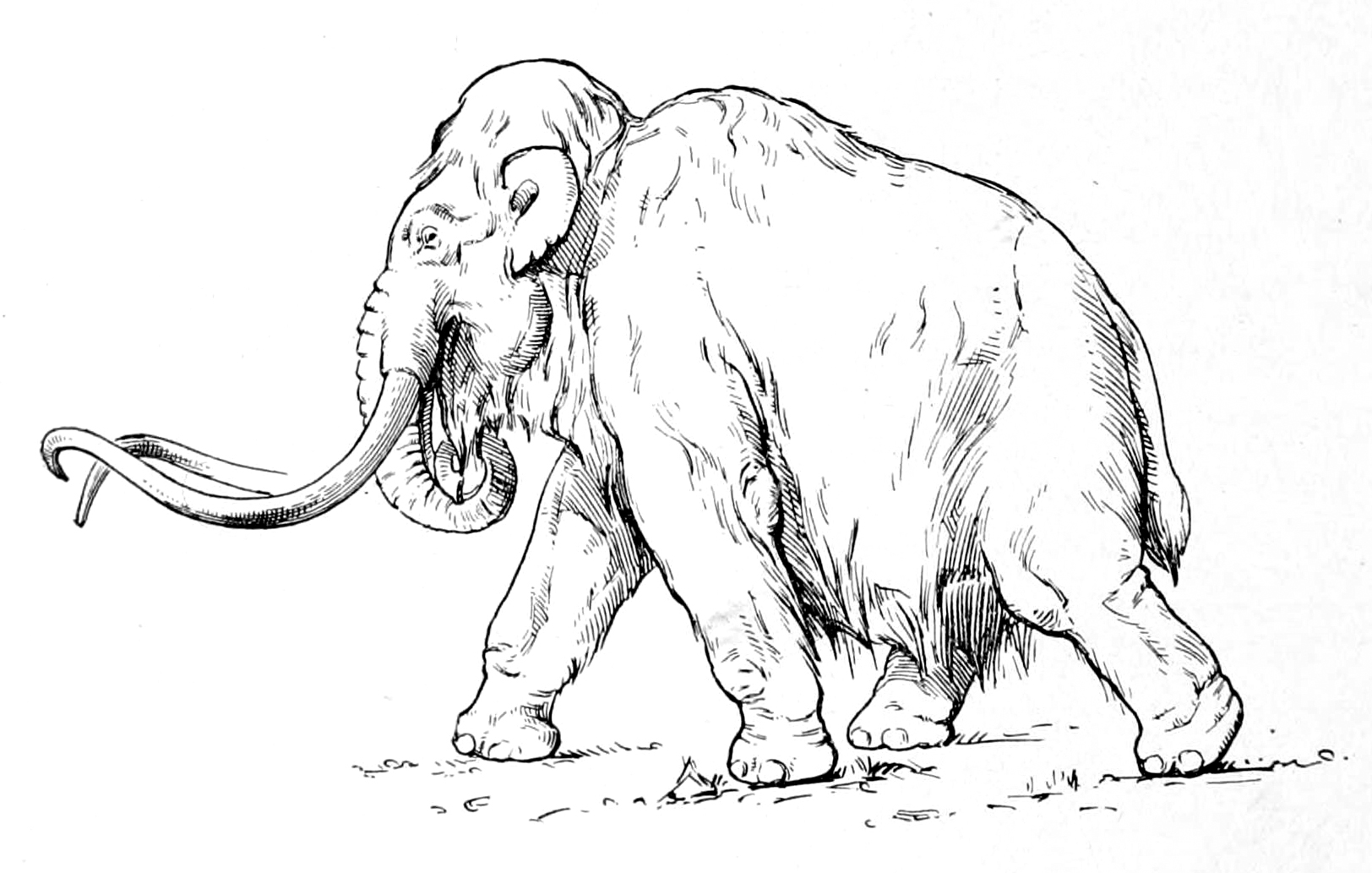
Life reconstruction of a Woolly mammoth

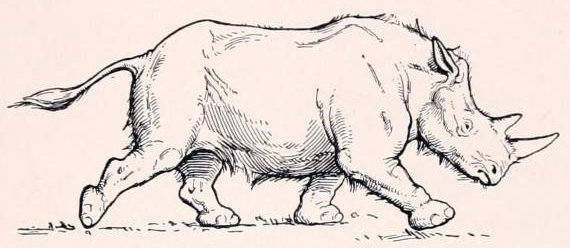
Life reconstruction of Stephanorhinus

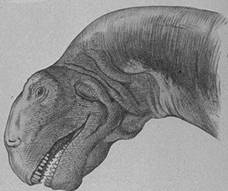
Portrait of Camarasaurus

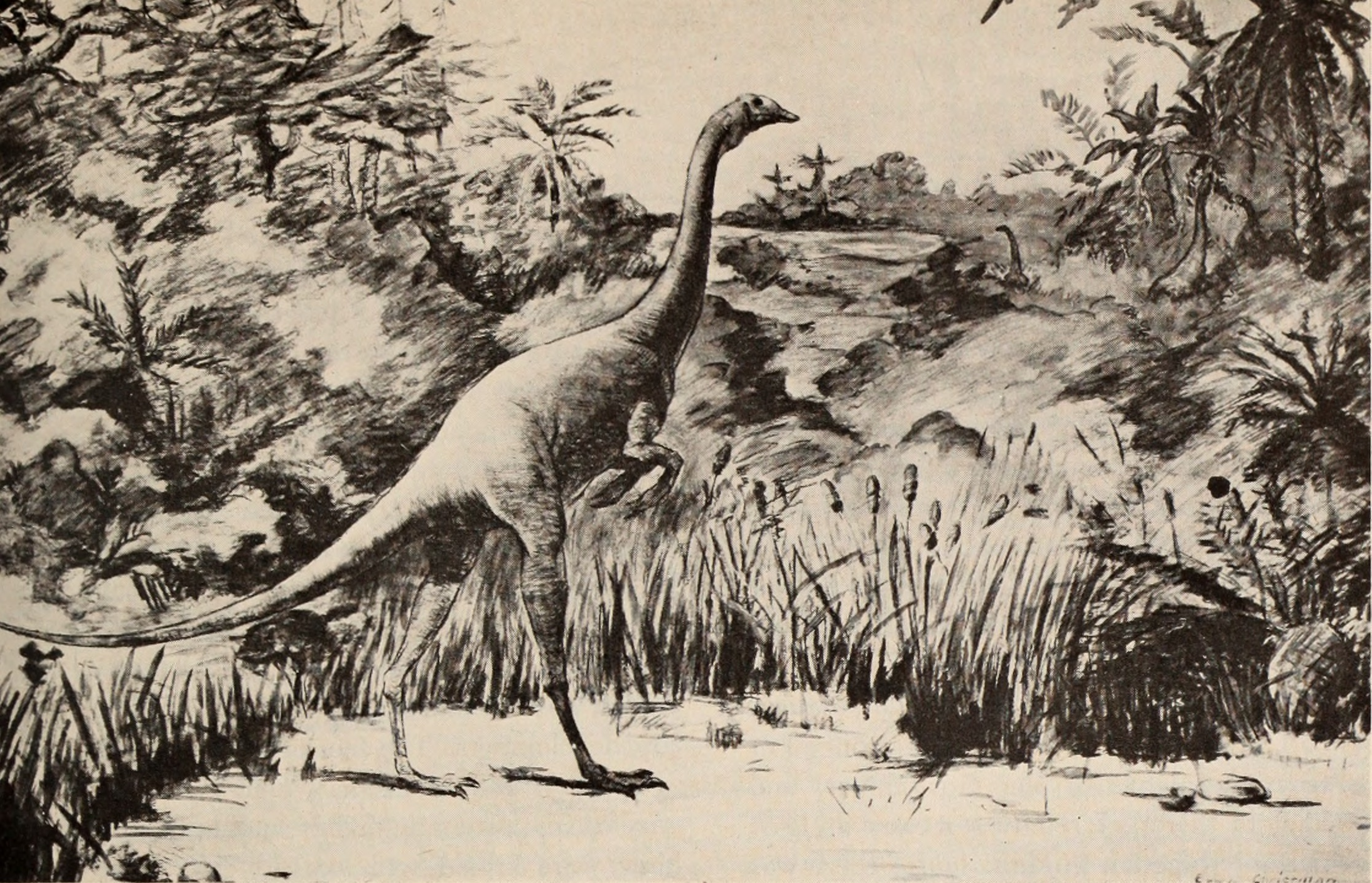
Life reconstruction of Struthiomimus

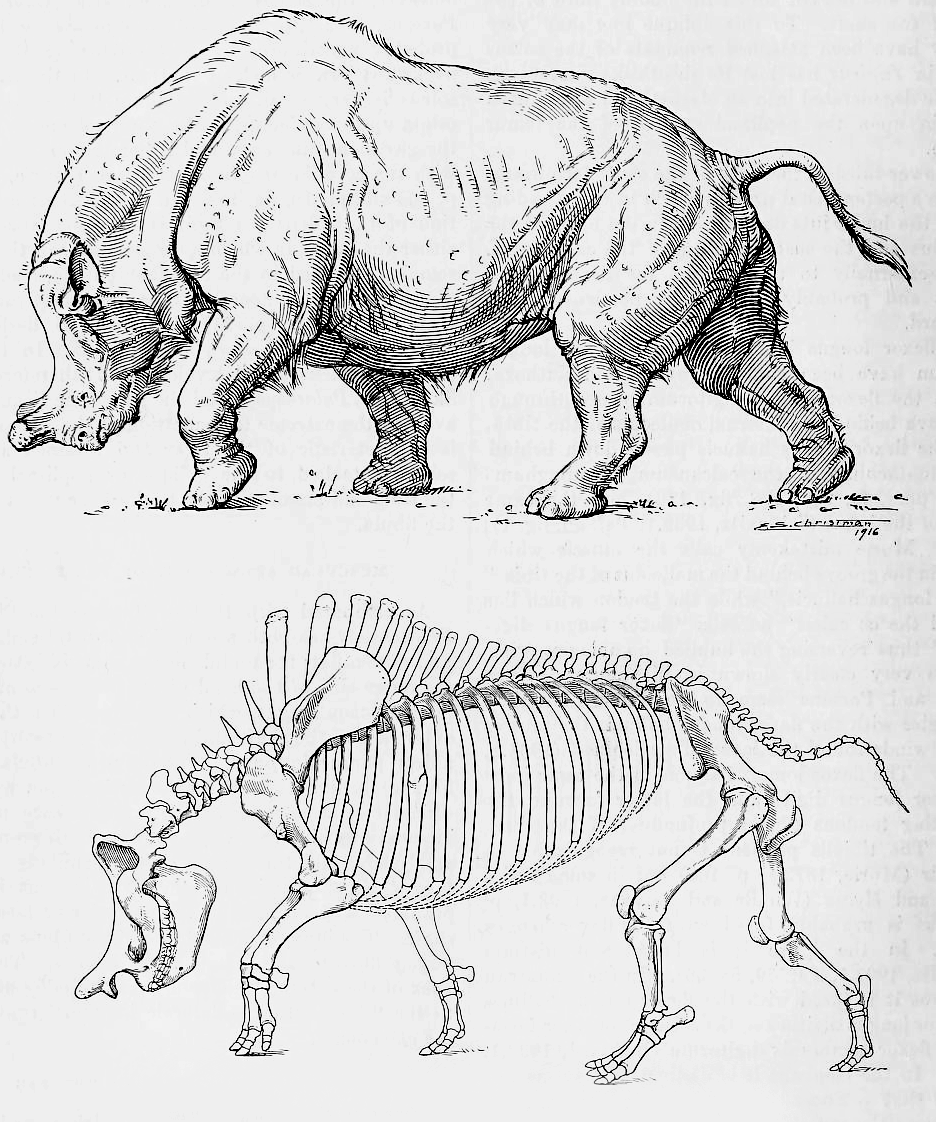
Skeletal and life reconstruction of Megacerops

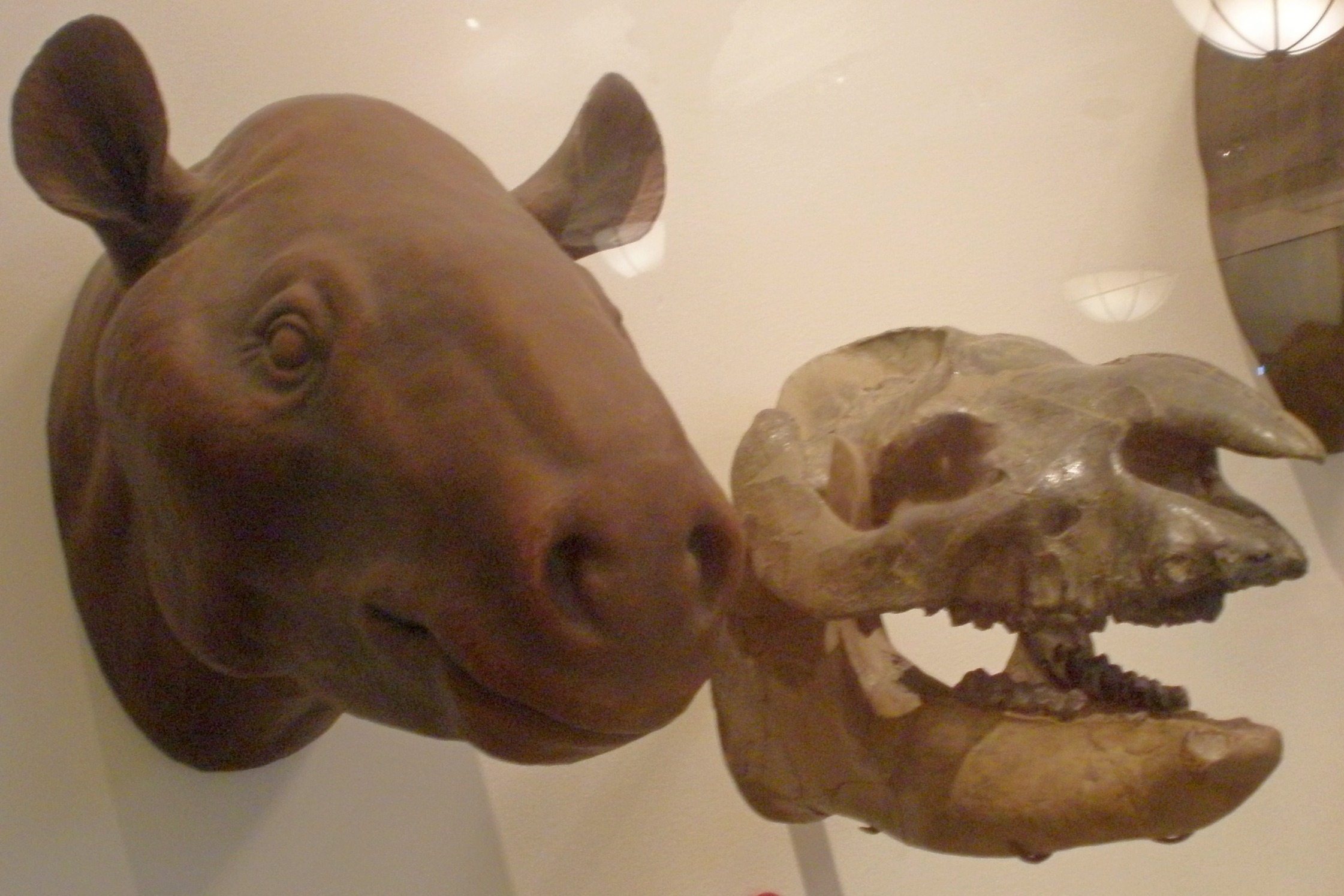
Model of Palaeosyops at the AMNH

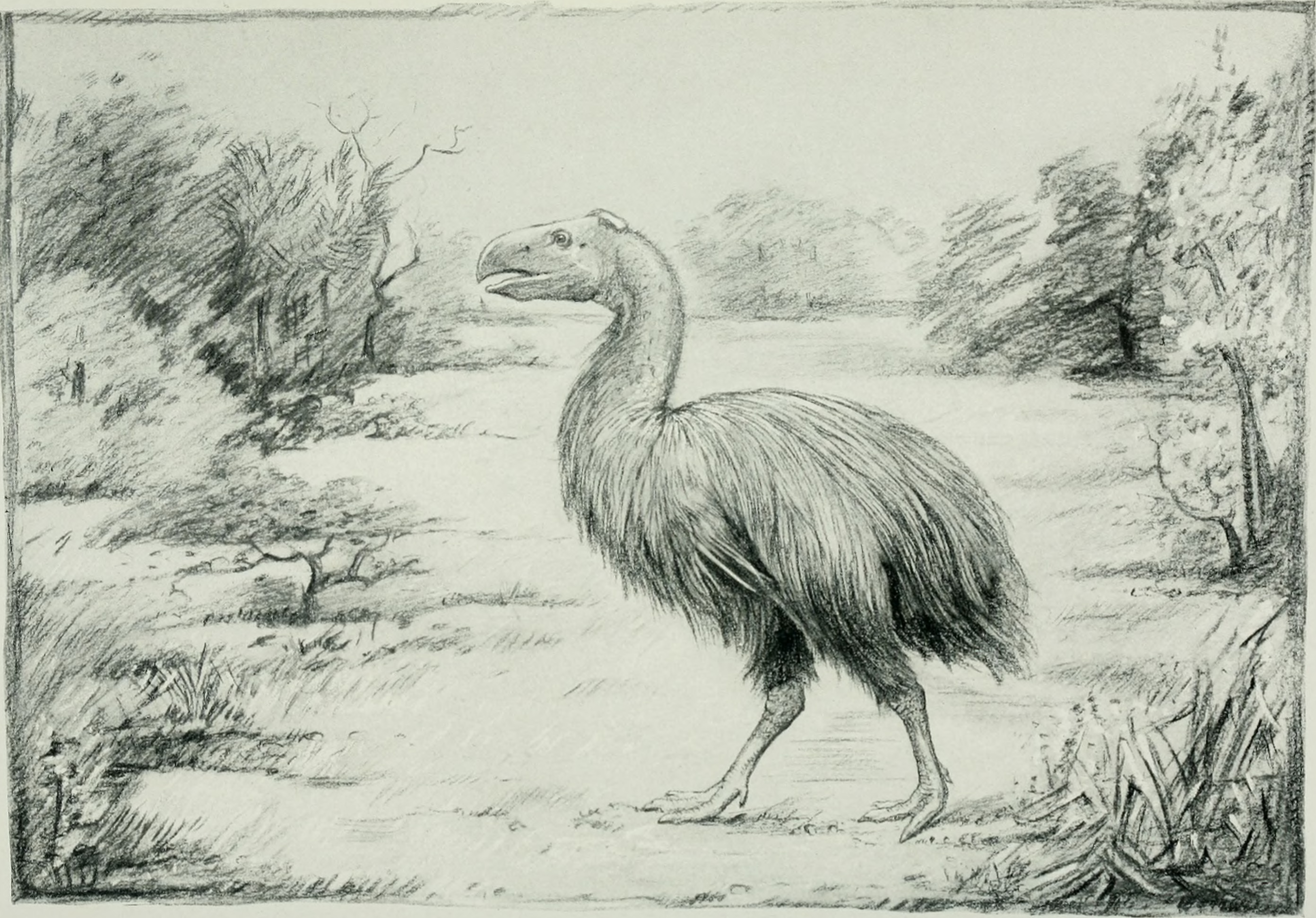
Life reconstruction of Diatryma (Gastornis)

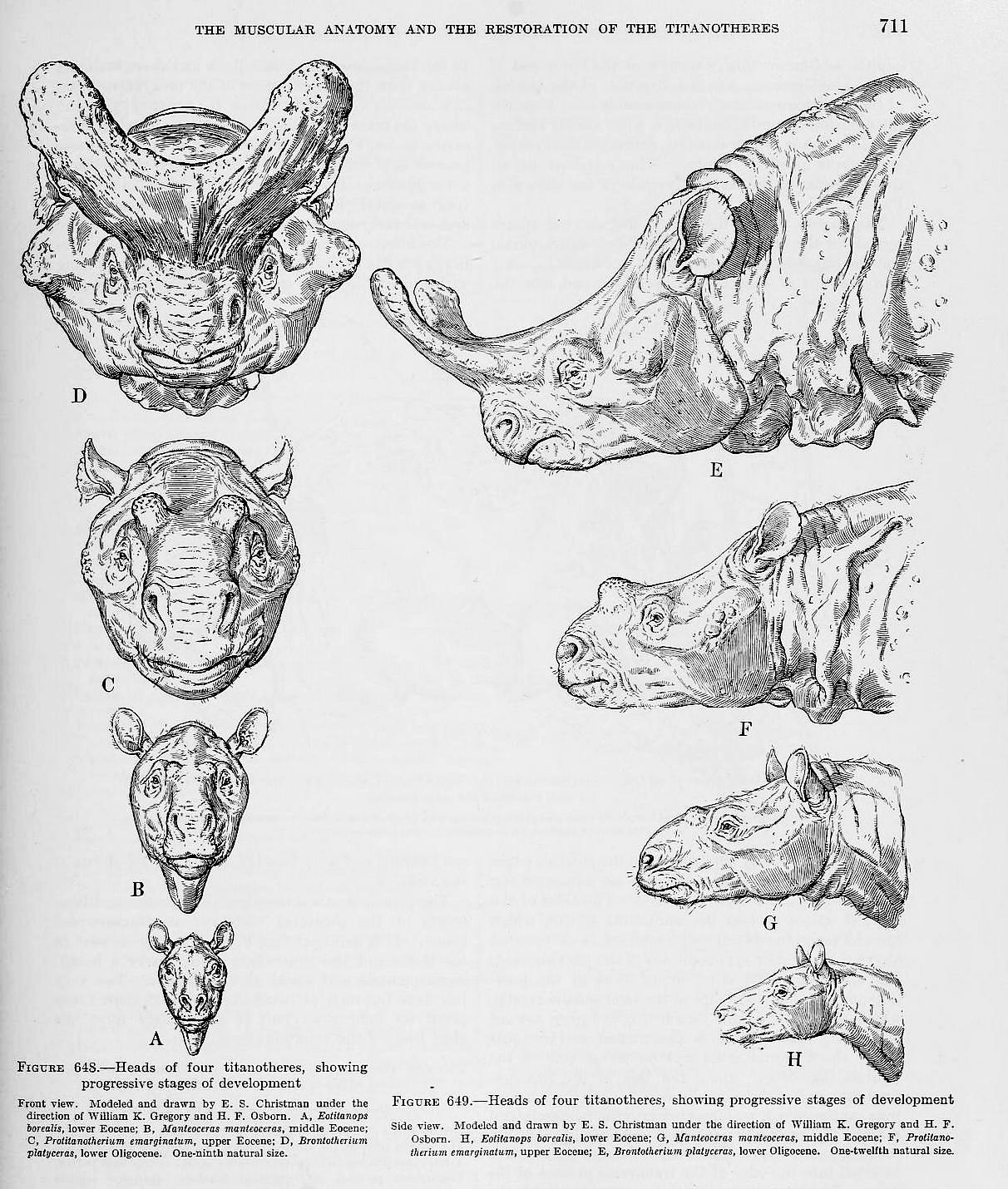
Orthogenetic sequence of brontothere evolution, illustrated for Henry Fairfield Osborn's monograph on brontotheres.

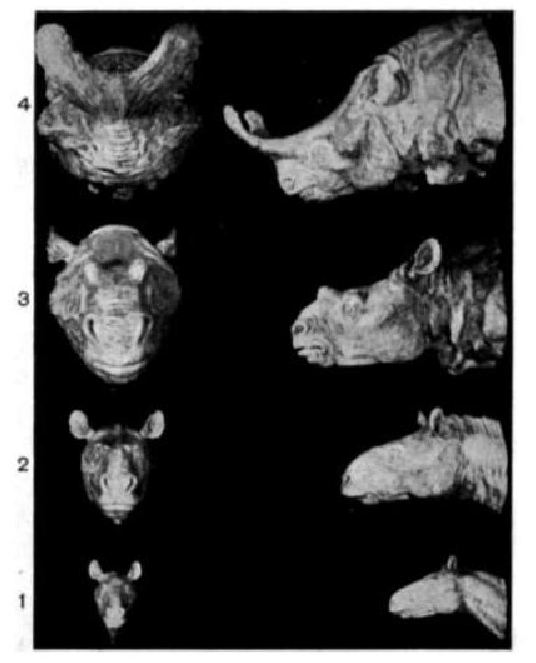
Models of the orthogenetic brontothere sequence

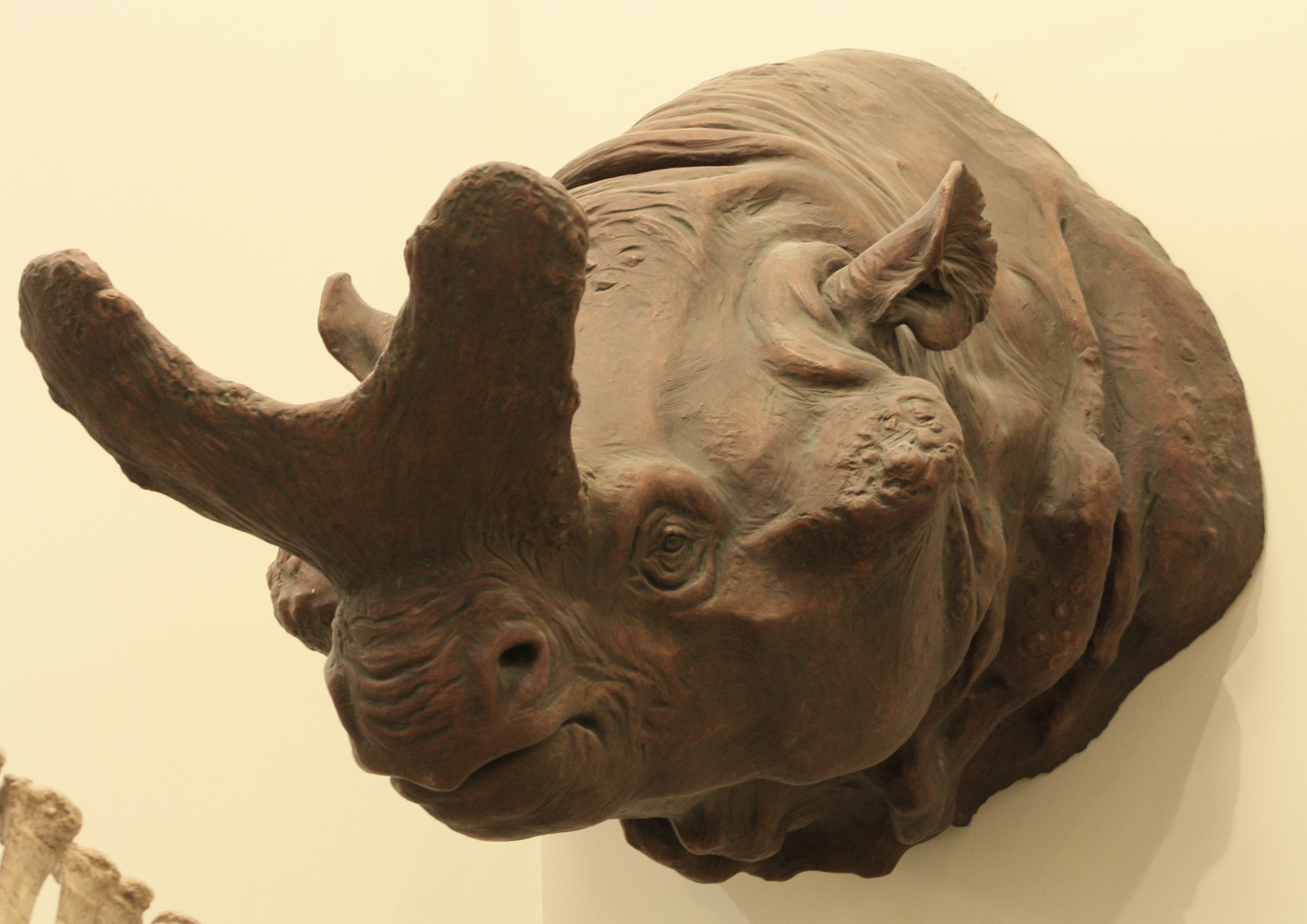
Model of Megacerops at the AMNH

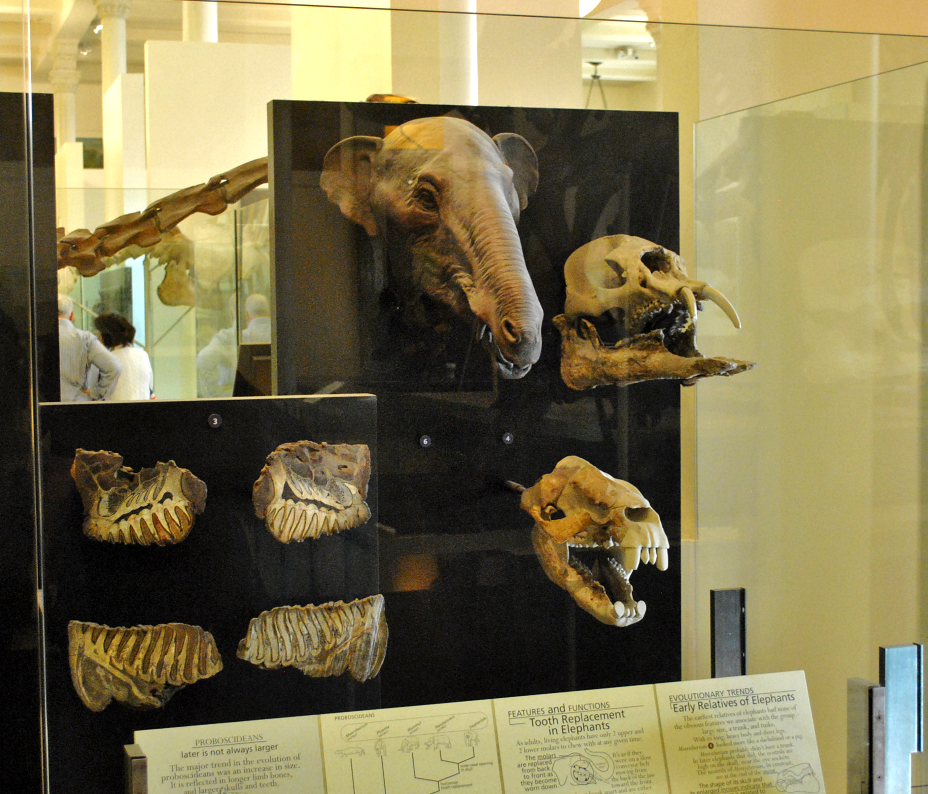
Model of Phiomia at the AMNH
