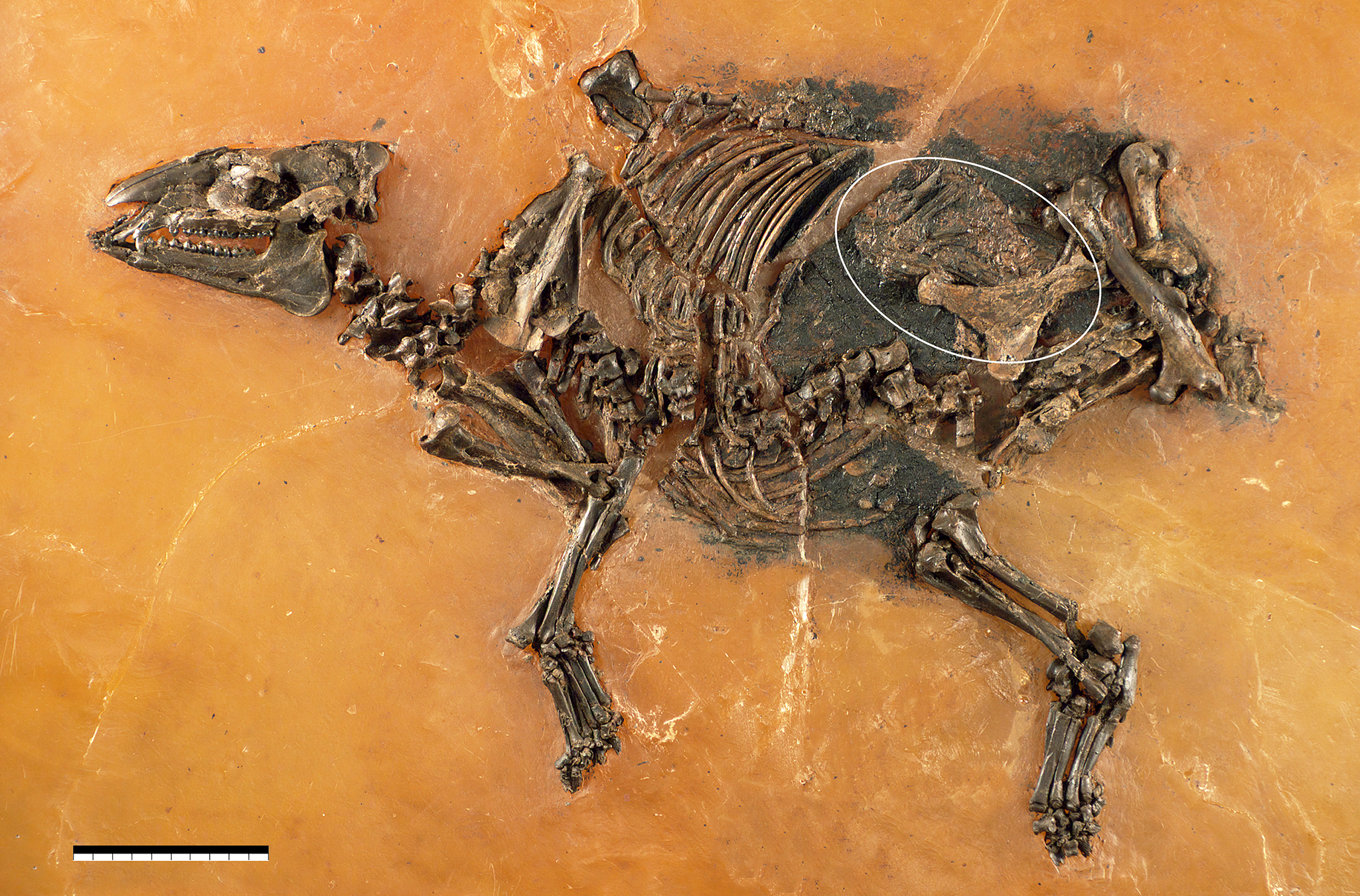
- E. messelensis fossil with fetus (encircled)

Scientific classification
- Kingdom: Animalia
- Phylum: Chordata
- Class: Mammalia
- Order: Perissodactyla
- Family: †Palaeotheriidae
- Subfamily: †Pachynolophinae
- Genus: †Eurohippus; Franzen, 2006

Type species
- †Lophiodon parvulus Laurillard, 1849

Species
- †E. parvulus; †E. messelensis

Synonyms
- Propalaeotherium parvulum; Propalaeotherium messelensis

= Eurohippus =

Extinct genus of mammals

Eurohippus is an extinct genus of equoid ungulate. Its species were long considered part of Propalaeotherium and Lophiotherium. A pregnant specimen was described in 2015.

== Fossil findings ==
Fossils of Eurohippus have been found in Central and Western Europe and are dated to the middle to upper Eocene. The earliest fossils were discovered in the early 19th century in Argenton-sur-Creuse in France. The most notable site is the Messel Pit near Darmstadt, Germany, where at least 43 skeletons have been recovered, some of them nearly complete due to their preservation in oil shale. This makes Eurohippus the most common member of equids found there, with evidence of individuals of both sexes and various age groups. There is a significant number of Eurohippus finds documented at Geiseltal southwest of the Halle, Germany. These specimens are distributed throughout the entire stratigraphic sequence, with isolated specimens from the Lower Carboniferous, and a greater prevalence in the Middle and Upper Carboniferous. In terms of chronological placement, the Lower Carboniferous corresponds roughly to that of the Messel Pit, while Middle and Upper Carboniferous are slightly younger. The finds here consist primarily of skull and dentition remains, with a total of about three dozen specimens. Additional finds, including teeth and upper jaw fragments, have been recovered from the Prinz von Hessen Pit, also located near Darmstadt. Among the latest and northernmost finds in Europe are those from Fürstenau in Lower Saxony and Gent in Belgium, although these consist only of isolated teeth.
