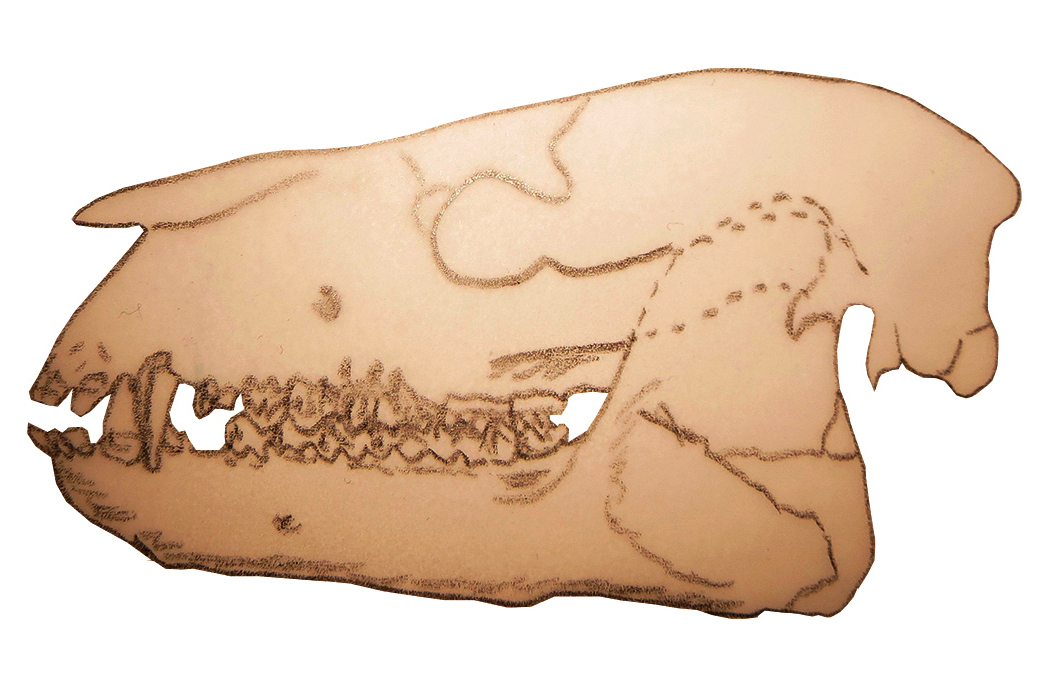
- Skull of S. tapirinus

Scientific classification
- Kingdom: Animalia
- Phylum: Chordata
- Class: Mammalia
- Order: Perissodactyla
- Clade: Tapiromorpha
- Genus: †Systemodon; Cope, 1881
- Species: †S. tapirinus

Binomial name
- †Systemodon tapirinus Cope, 1875

Synonyms
- Orohippus tapirinus Cope, 1875; Hyracotherium tapirinus Cope, 1877; Hyracotherium tapirinum Wortman 1896; Eohippus tapirinus Hay 1899

= Systemodon =

Systemodon Temporal range: 55.8–50.3 Ma

Genus of mammals

Systemodon is a genus of early Eocene mammal of Wasatchian age (ca. 55-50 mya). It was one of many mammals originally considered the earliest horses, long classified in the genus Hyracotherium (commonly known as Eohippus). These were dog-sized animals that in life would have looked vaguely like a paca, mara, or chevrotain (though they were perissodactyls, not rodents or artiodactyls.) The type species, S. tapirinus, is represented by 24 individuals from a locale called the Castillo pocket in the Huerfano Formation of Colorado. This well-preserved deposit allows researchers to reconstruct aspects of the environment and lifestyle of the species.

== Taxonomy ==
The genus was named by E.D. Cope in 1875, who recognized it as different from Hyracotherium and a basal perissodactyl. It was later believed to be an equid and referred to Hyracotherium (Hyracotherium tapirinum, incl. H. cristatum Wortman 1896, also =Orohippus tapirinus). A 1984 analysis revealed this species did not fit well with others in the genus. Such studies revealed that Hyracotherium had become a wastebasket taxon of early perissodactyls; many species have now been reassigned to other genera whose exact relationships are not yet resolved. Systemodon has been identified as allied to Cymbalophus and as one of the most basal perissodactyls, making it part of the stem group ancestral to horses, rhinos, tapirs, and the extinct brontotheres and chalicotheres. If Systemodon is a stem perissodactyl, its unusually good preservation gives a rare glimpse into what is basal in the behavior as well as the form of a large group of mammals.

Three other species were formerly assigned to this genus: S. semihians, S. protapirinus, and S. primaevus. The first has been reassigned to Cardiolophus, and the second and third synonymized as Hyracotherium protapirinus.

== Paleobiology ==
S. tapirinus lived in patchy woodlands near streams, an environment it shared with a smaller species of perissodactyl, Hyracotherium vasacciense. Other inhabitants of these environments included lemur-like and tarsier-like early primates, and flesh-eating creodonts. Analysis of its teeth and fossil pollen suggests that while Systemodon did not have the high-crowned molars needed to chew grass, it did not eat forest plants as has often been assumed for early ungulates, but browsed instead on forbs and flowers in more open areas. Both females and males had enlarged canine teeth. Fossils show two clear adult size groups that indicate sexual dimorphism, with male skulls about 15% larger than females, with 40% larger canine teeth. The presence of the genus coincides with a cooling and drying period where the closed tropical forests of the Paleocene-Eocene Thermal Maximum gave way to new, more open environments similar to modern park woodlands and savannas. Based on comparison with the anatomy and habits of living ungulates, it is likely that Systemodon lived in female groups, herding together as protection from predators in open spaces or to make the best use of localized patches of food in mixed environments. Prime-age males may have competed with each other to live in these groups, and used their canines in ritualized competitive battles or displays.
