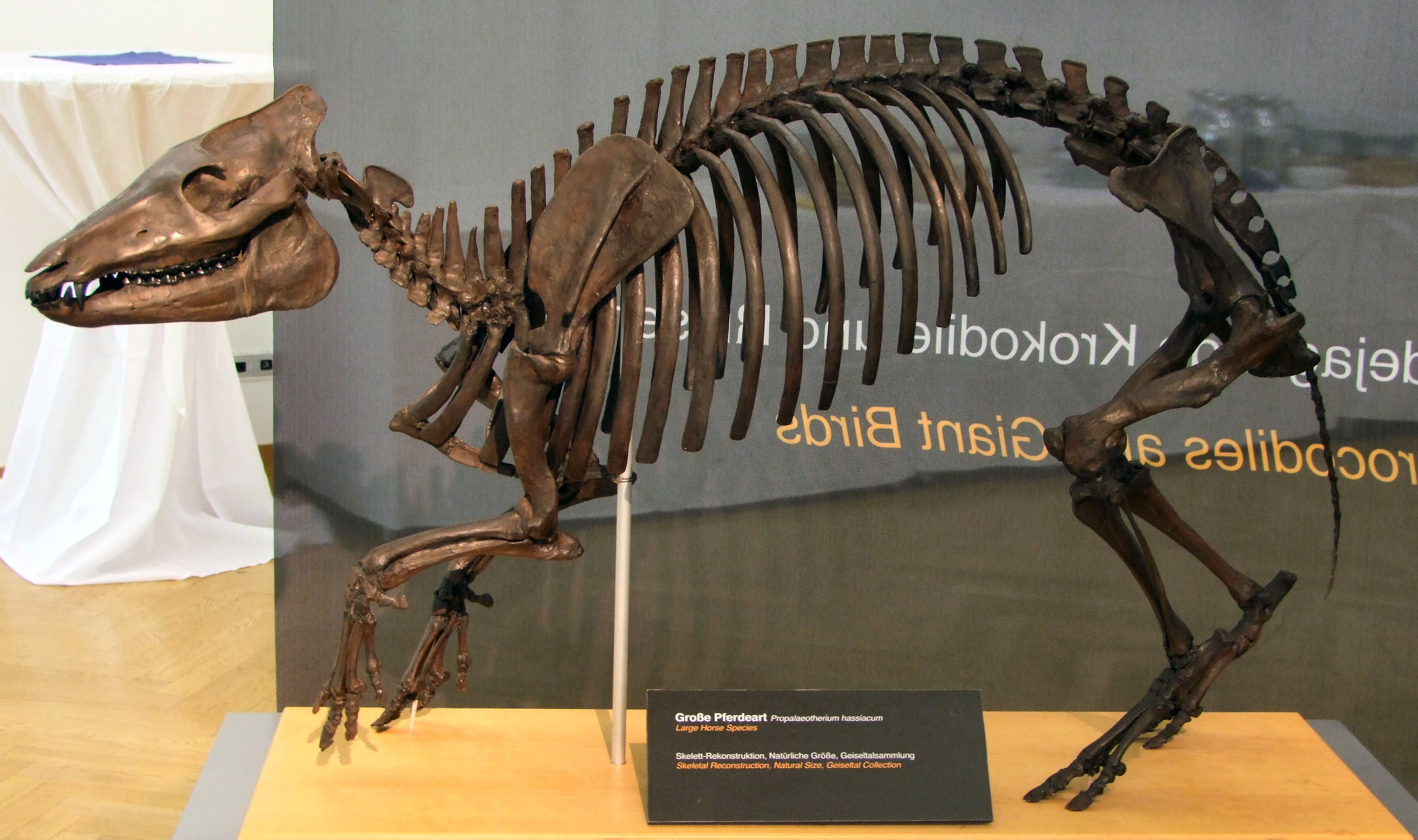
- Restored P. hassiacum skeleton

Scientific classification
- Kingdom: Animalia
- Phylum: Chordata
- Class: Mammalia
- Order: Perissodactyla
- Family: †Palaeotheriidae
- Genus: †Propalaeotherium; Gervais, 1849

Type species
- †Propalaeotherium isselanum Cuvier, 1824

Species
- †P. argentonicum Gervais, 1849; †P. hassiacum Haupt, 1925; †P. helveticum Savage et al., 1965; †P. isselanum Cuvier, 1824; †P. sudrei Remy, Krasovec & Marandat, 2016; †P. voigti Matthes, 1977

= Propalaeotherium =

Propalaeotherium Temporal range: Ypresian, 56.0–47.8 Ma

Extinct genus of mammals

Propalaeotherium was an early genus of perissodactyl endemic to Europe and Asia during the early Eocene. There are currently six recognised species within the genus, with P. isselanum as the type species (named by Georges Cuvier in 1824).

== Taxonomy ==
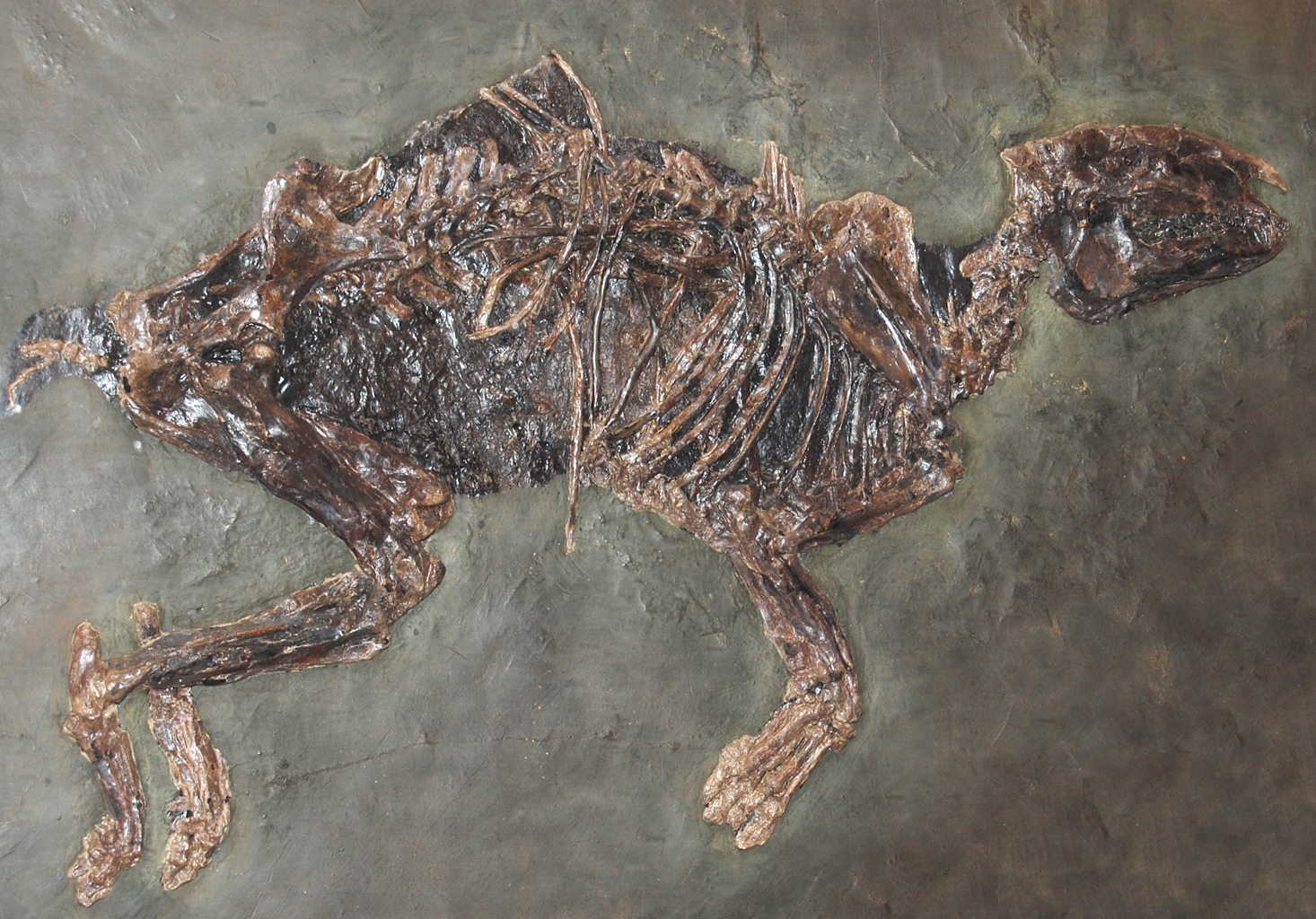
Fossil in Vienna.

Propalaeotherium was named by Paul Gervais; its name means "before Palaeotherium". It was considered a member of Palaeotheriidae by Hooker (1986). A 2004 study found it to be an equid instead. A 2016 study lumped the genus back within the Palaeotheriidae.

The species P. parvulum and P. messelensis have been alternately assigned to the equid genus Eurohippus.

== Description ==
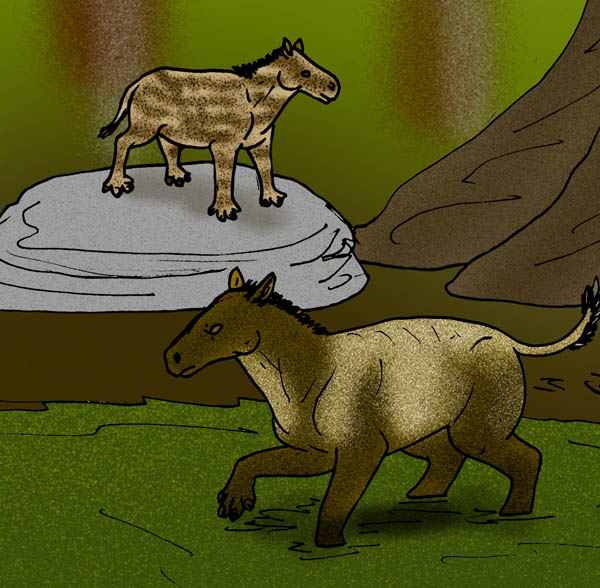
Eurohippus parvulus (on rock) and P. hassiacum (in water).

Propalaeotherium was a small animal, ranging from 30–60 cm at the shoulder (2.9 to 5.9 hands), and weighing just 10 kg (22 lb). Despite being an early form of horse, it looked similar to small tapirs. It had no hooves, but instead several small nail-like hooflets. The well-preserved Messel fossils showed their herbivory, specifically their preference to eat berries and leaf matter picked up from the forest floor.

== See also ==
- Evolution of the horse
- List of prehistoric mammals
