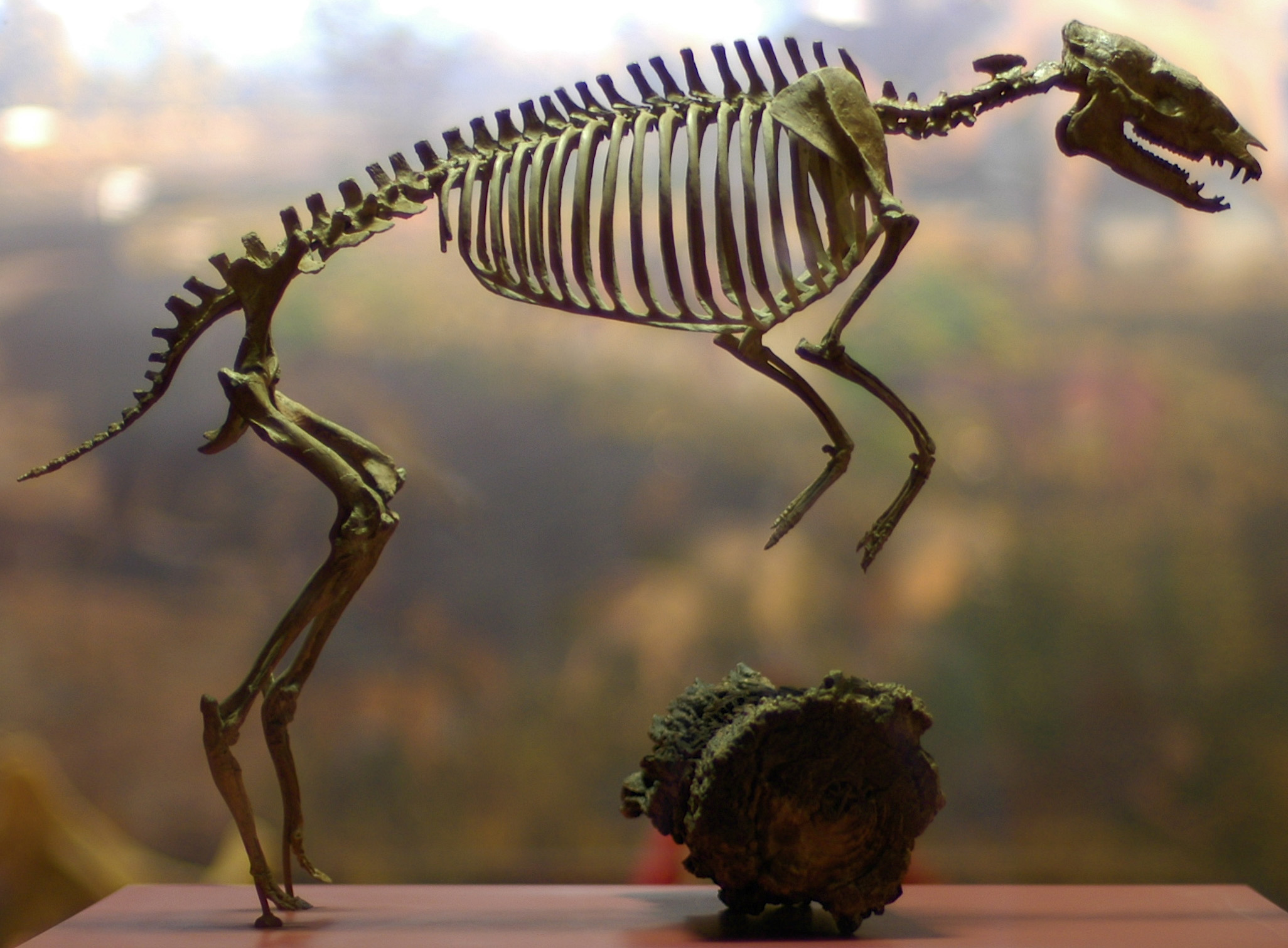
- Reconstructed skeleton, National Museum of Natural History, Washington, D.C., United States

Scientific classification
- Kingdom: Animalia
- Phylum: Chordata
- Class: Mammalia
- Order: Perissodactyla
- Family: Equidae
- Genus: †Eohippus; Marsh, 1876
- Species: †E. angustidens

Binomial name
- †Eohippus angustidens (Cope, 1875)

Synonyms
- Eohippus validus; Hyracotherium angustidens; H. a. angustidens; H. a. etsagicum; H. vasacciense; H. v. vasacciense; H. cusptidatum; H. seekinsi; H. loevii; Orohippus angustidens; Orohippus cuspidatus; Orohippus vasacciensis; Lophiotherium vasacciense

= Eohippus =

Eohippus Temporal range: Ypresian, 55.8–47.8 Ma

Extinct genus of primitive horse

Eohippus is an extinct genus of small equids. The only species is E. angustidens, which was long considered a species of Hyracotherium (now strictly defined as a member of the Palaeotheriidae rather than the Equidae). Its remains have been identified in North America and date to the Early Eocene (Ypresian stage).

== Discovery ==
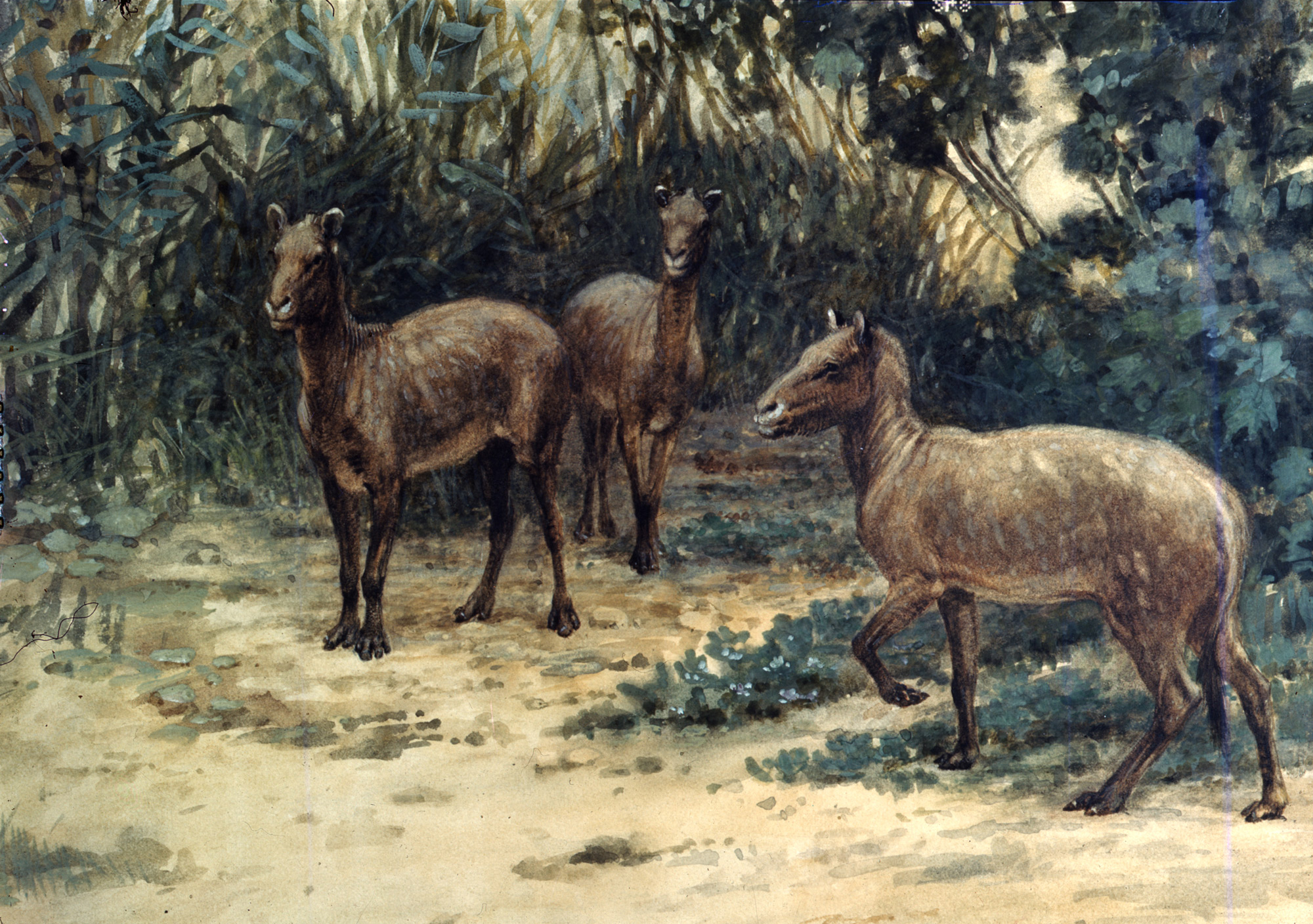
Restoration by Charles Knight

In 1876, Othniel C. Marsh described a skeleton as Eohippus validus, from Greek: ἠώς (ēōs, 'dawn') and ἵππος (hippos, 'horse'), meaning 'dawn horse'. Its similarities with fossils described by Richard Owen were formally pointed out in a 1932 paper by Clive Forster Cooper. E. validus was moved to the genus Hyracotherium, which had priority as the name for the genus, with Eohippus becoming a junior synonym of that genus. Hyracotherium was recently found to be a paraphyletic group of species, and the genus now includes only H. leporinum. E. validus was found to be identical to an earlier-named species, Orohippus angustidens Cope, 1875, and the resulting binomial is thus Eohippus angustidens.

== Description ==
Eohippus stood at about 12 in (30 cm), or three hands tall, at the shoulder. It had four toes on its front feet and three toes on the hind feet, each toe ending in a hoof. Its incisors, molars and premolars resemble modern Equus. However, a differentiating trait of Eohippus is the large canine teeth.

== See also ==
- Evolution of the horse
- Mesohippus
- Protohippus
