= Mesolambdolophus =

Mesolambdolophus Temporal range: Eocene

Scientific classification
- Domain: Eukaryota
- Kingdom: Animalia
- Phylum: Chordata
- Class: Mammalia
- Order: Perissodactyla
- Genus: †Mesolambdolophus; Holbrook & Lapergola, 2011

Type species
- †Mesolambdolophus setoni Holbrook & Lapergola, 2011

Extinct genus of mammals

Mesolambdolophus is an extinct genus of small odd-toed ungulate known from the Bridgerian North American Stage (late Early to early Middle Eocene) of Wyoming, United States. It is known only from the holotype MCZ 19585, a nearly complete mandible which was collected from the Bridger Formation. It was first named by Luke T. Holbrook and Joshua Lapergola in 2011 and the type species is Mesolambdolophus setoni.
