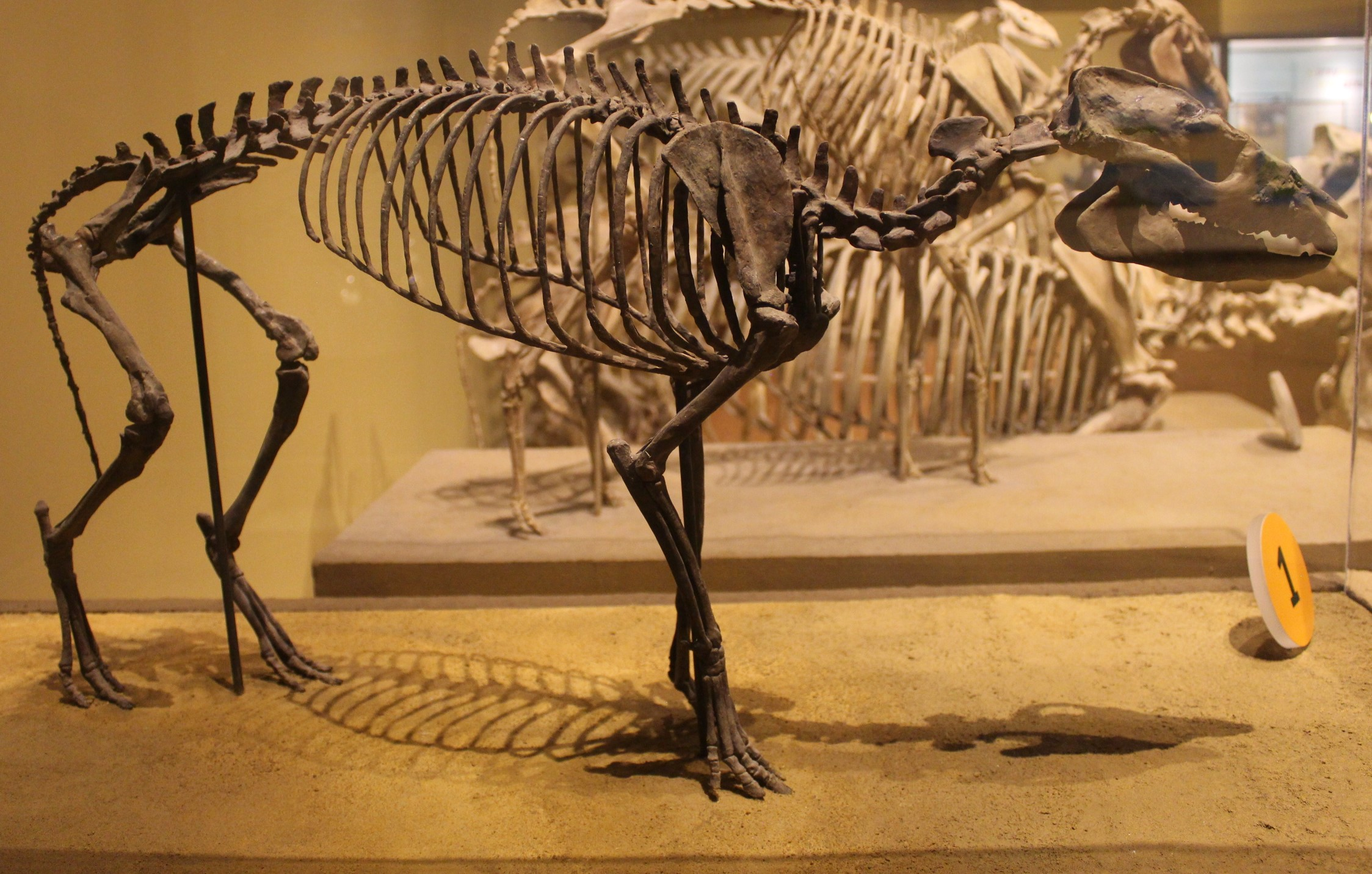
- Skeletal mount, Field Museum of Natural History

Scientific classification
- Kingdom: Animalia
- Phylum: Chordata
- Class: Mammalia
- Order: Perissodactyla
- Family: †Palaeotheriidae
- Genus: †Hyracotherium; Owen, 1841

Species
- †H. leporinum

= Hyracotherium =

Hyracotherium Temporal range: 55–45 Ma

Extinct genus of mammals

Hyracotherium (/ˌhaɪrəkoʊˈθɪəriəm, -kə-/ HY-rək-o-THEER-ee-əm; "hyrax-like beast") is an extinct genus of small (about 60 cm in length) perissodactyl ungulates that was found in the Eocene-aged London Clay formation. This small, fox-sized animal was once considered to be the earliest known member of Equidae before the type species, H. leporinum, was reclassified as a palaeothere. The remaining species are now thought to belong to different genera, such as Eohippus, which had previously been synonymised with Hyracotherium.

== Description ==
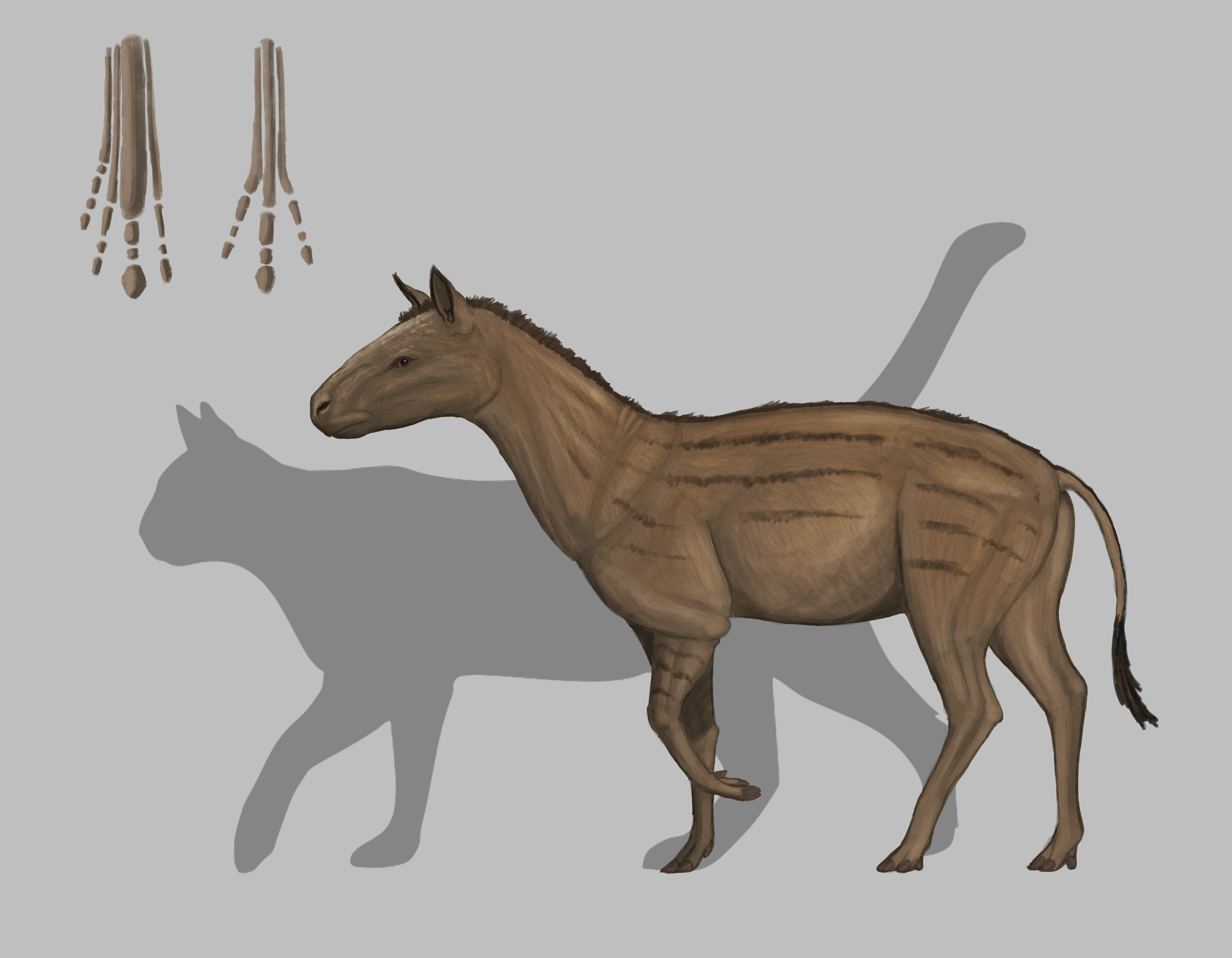
Size comparison between Hyracotherium and a domestic cat.

Hyracotherium averaged 78 cm (2.5 feet) in length and weighed about 9 kg (20 pounds). It had a short face with eye sockets in the middle and a short diastema (the space between the front teeth and the cheek teeth). The skull was long, having 44 low-crowned teeth. Although it had low-crowned teeth, the beginnings of the characteristic horse-like ridges on the molars can be seen.

== Discovery ==
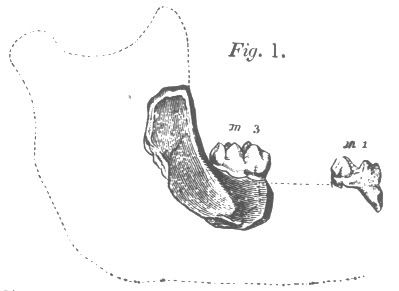
Holotype BMNH M16336

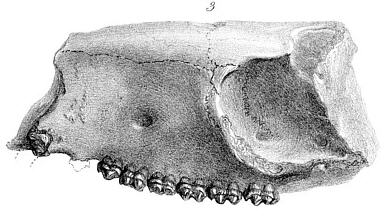
BMNH C21361, the second specimen

The first fossil identified as being of this genus, holotype specimen BMNH M16336, was found in the cliffs of Studd Hill near Herne Bay, Kent, and described by the paleontologist Richard Owen in a paper read to the Geological Society of London on 18 December 1839 as a "small mutilated cranium about the size of that of a hare". He identified it as belonging to an extinct order of Pachydermata, with teeth resembling those of the Chaeropotamus and the general form of the skull "partaking of a character intermediate between that of the hog and the hyrax, though the large size of the eye must have given to the physiognomy of the living animal a resemblance to that of the Rodentia." Referring to this resemblance to the hyrax, Owen proposed the genus name Hyracotherium for this new genus. In his formal description published by the Geological Society in 1841, Owen wrote "Without intending to imply that the present small extinct Pachyderm was more closely allied to the Hyrax than as being a member of the same order, and similar in size, I propose to call the new genus which it unquestionably indicates, Hyracotherium, with the specific name leporinum."

In 1876 Othniel C. Marsh published the description of a full skeleton found in New Mexico, which he placed in a new genus Eohippus. Its similarities with the fossils described by Owen were pointed out in a 1932 paper by Sir Clive Forster Cooper. The only species, E. angustidens, was moved to the genus Hyracotherium, which had priority as the name for the genus, with Eohippus becoming a junior synonym of that genus. Many other North American equids were subsequently classified as species of Hyracotherium as well, but this synonymy was questioned in 2002.

== Taxonomy and evolution ==
The type species, H. leporinum, is now regarded as a paleothere, rather than a horse proper. Most other species of Hyracotherium are still regarded as equids, but they have been placed in several other genera, such as Arenahippus, Minippus, Sifrhippus, Xenicohippus, Pliolophus, Protorohippus and the resurrected Eohippus. At one time, Xenicohippus was regarded as an early brontothere. The main stream of horse evolution occurred on the North American continent.

== Palaeobiology ==
=== Palaeoecology ===
Hyracotherium is believed to have been a browsing herbivore that ate primarily soft leaves as well as some fruits and nuts and plant shoots. Dental microwear indicates that it was a folivore that facultatively ate non-fibrous food such as fruits and seeds when they were available.

== See also ==
- Equus
- Evolution of the horse
- Merychippus
- Mesohippus
