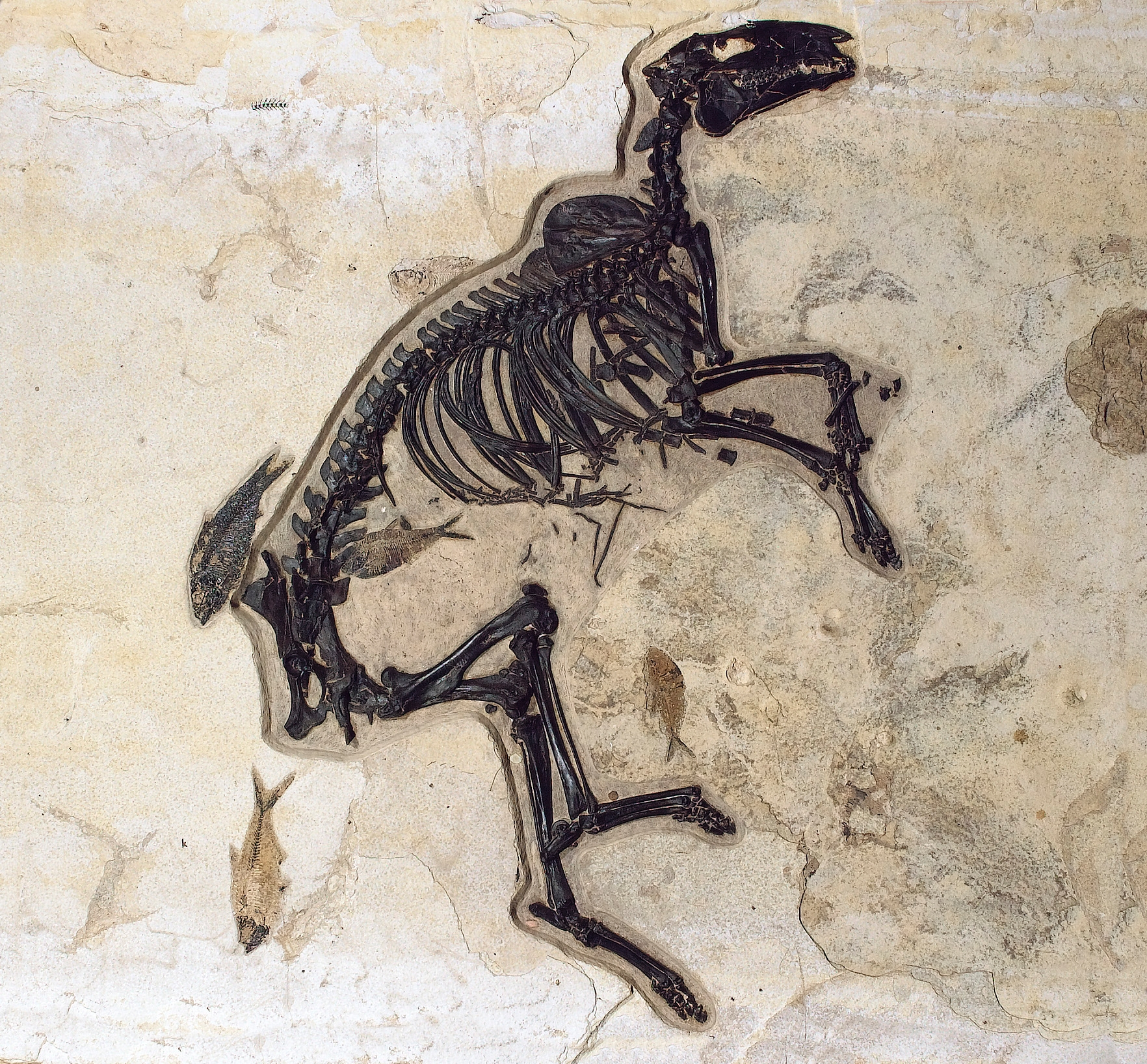
- Fossil from the Green River Formation

Scientific classification
- Kingdom: Animalia
- Phylum: Chordata
- Class: Mammalia
- Order: Perissodactyla
- Family: Equidae
- Genus: †Protorohippus; Wortman, 1896

Type species
- Protorohippus venticolum (Cope, 1881)

Species
- †P. venticolum (Cope, 1881); †P. montanum Wortman, 18961

Synonyms
- Hyracotherium venticolum Cope, 1881; Hyracotherium vasacciense venticolum Kitts, 1956; Eohippus venticolum Granger, 1908

= Protorohippus =

Protorohippus Temporal range: Eocene (Wasatchian)

Extinct genus of mammals

Protorohippus (Latin: "before" (pro), + Greek: "mountain" (oros), "horse" (hippos)) is an extinct genus of equid that lived in the Eocene of North America.

== Palaeobiology ==
Based on oxygen and carbon isotope analysis of the teeth of P. montanum, the species is believed to have had two distinct birth seasons per year, a result of the diminished seasonality during the Early Eocene. It is possible that this phenomenon held for other early equids as well.

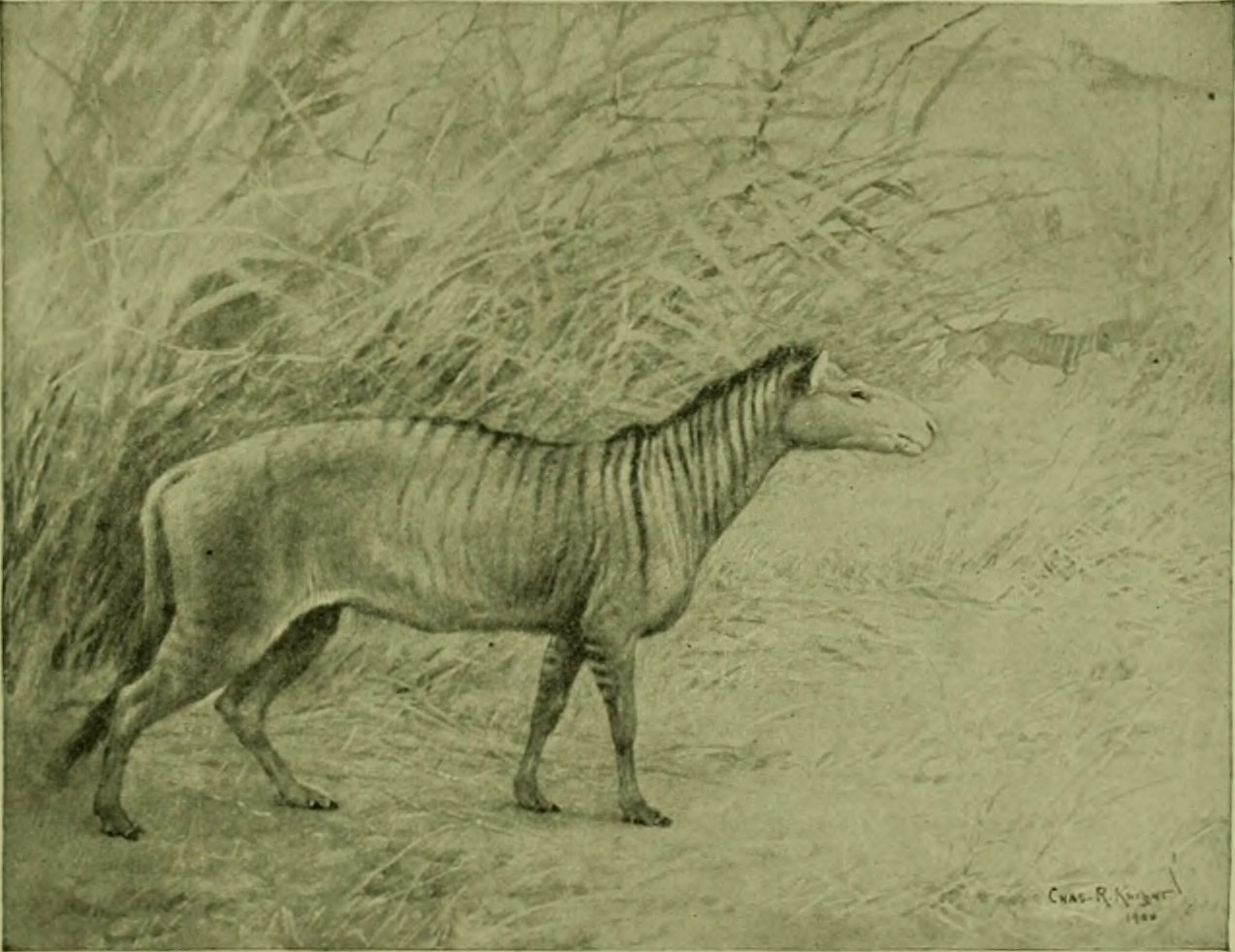
Restoration by Charles R. Knight

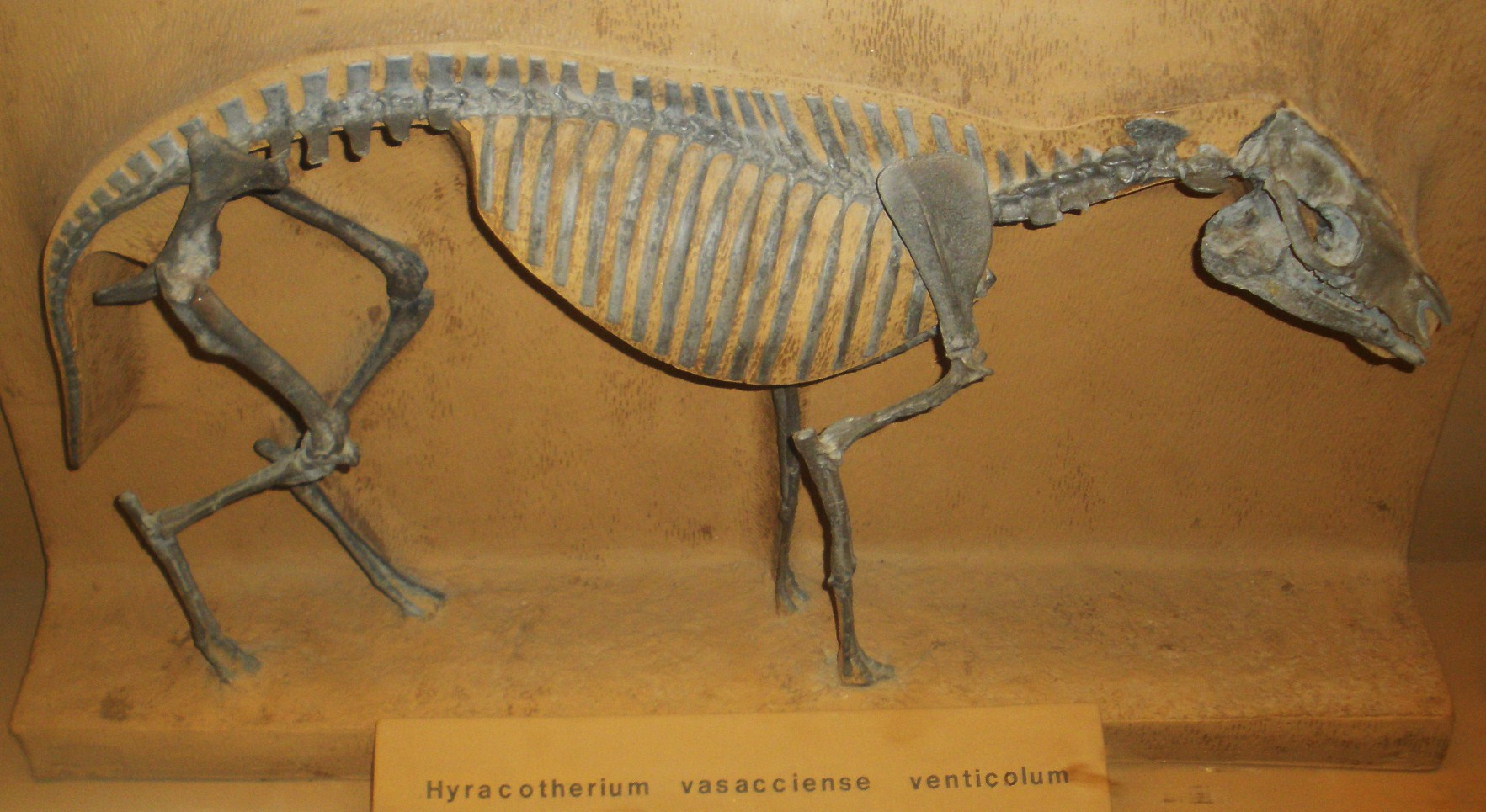
Skeleton cast

== See also ==
- Evolution of the horse
