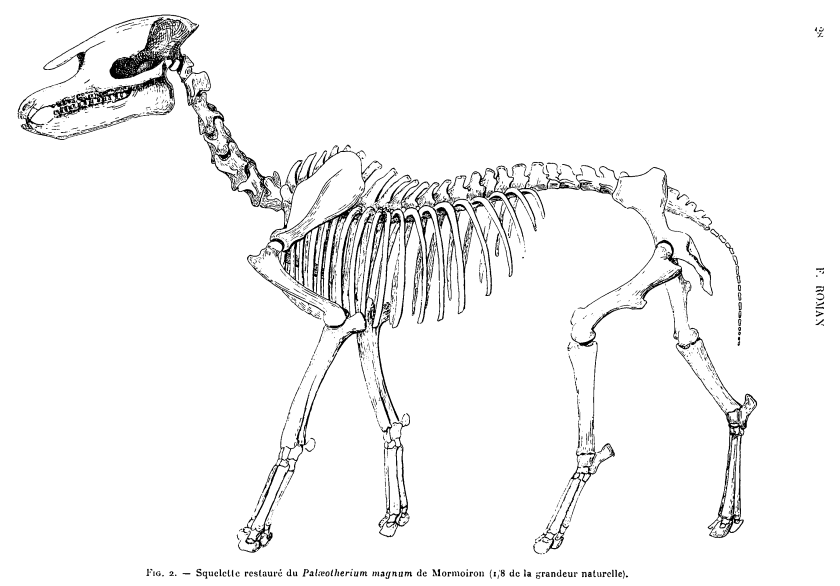
- Palaeotherium magnum skeleton
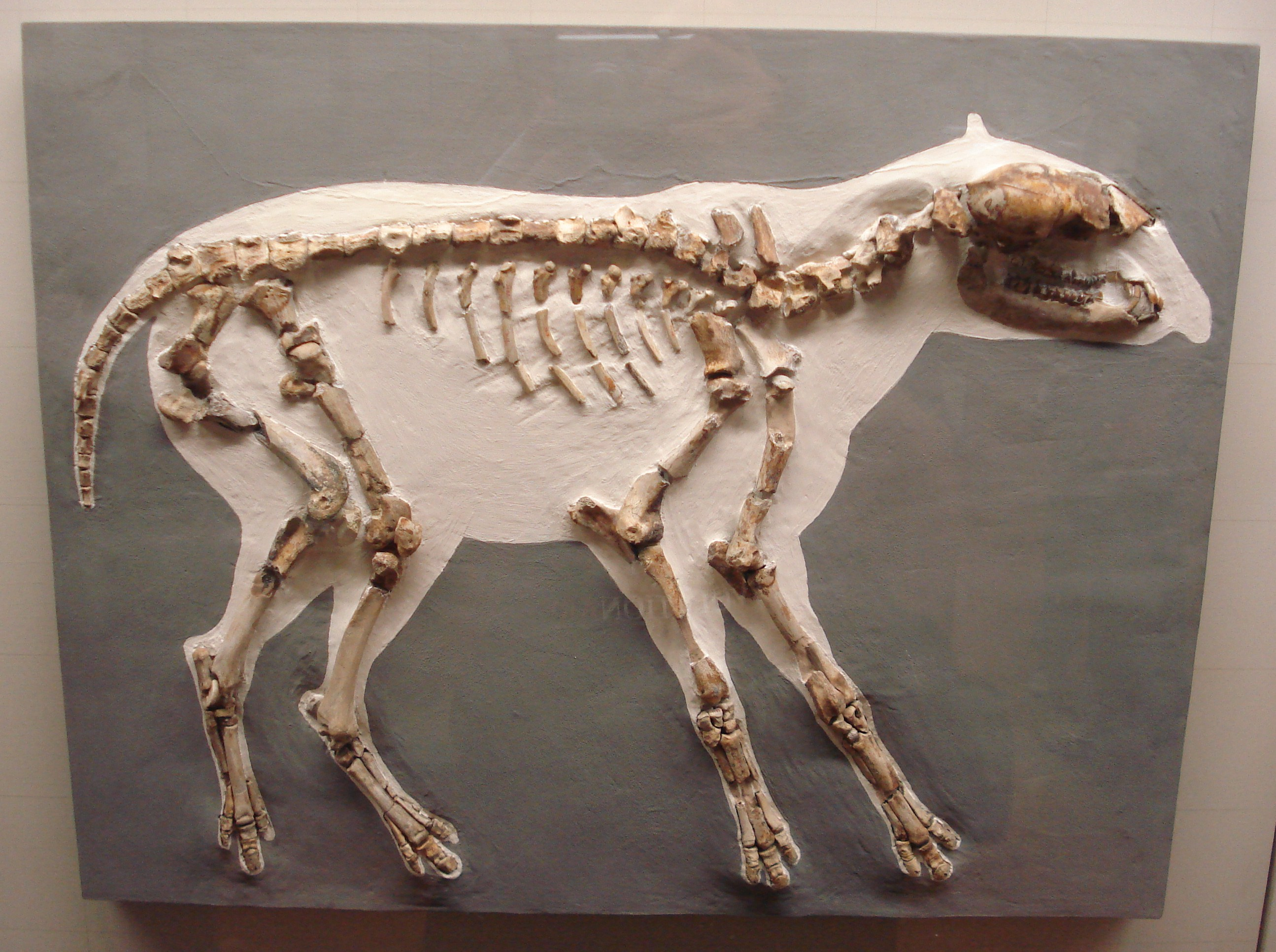
- Fossil of Plagiolophus

Scientific classification
- Kingdom: Animalia
- Phylum: Chordata
- Class: Mammalia
- Order: Perissodactyla
- Superfamily: Equoidea
- Family: †Palaeotheriidae; Bonaparte, 1850

Genera
- Pachynolophinae; Anchilophus; Bepitherium; Eurohippus; Hyracotherium; Lijiangia; Lophiohippus; Lophiotherium; Metanchilophus; Orolophus; Pachynolophus; Paranchilophus; Propalaeotherium; Qianohippus; Palaeotheriinae; Cantabrotherium; Iberolophus; Idiodontherium; Leptolophus; Mekodontherium; Metaplagiolophus; Palaeotherium; Paraplagiolophus; Plagiolophus; Pseudopalaeotherium

Synonyms
- Pachynolophidae Pavlow, 1888

= Palaeotheriidae =

Palaeotheriidae Temporal range: 55–28 Ma Early Eocene to early Oligocene

Extinct family of mammals

Palaeotheriidae is an extinct family of herbivorous perissodactyl mammals that inhabited Europe, with less abundant remains also known from Asia, from the mid-Eocene to the early Oligocene. They are classified in Equoidea, along with the living family Equidae (which includes zebras, horses and asses).

== Morphology ==
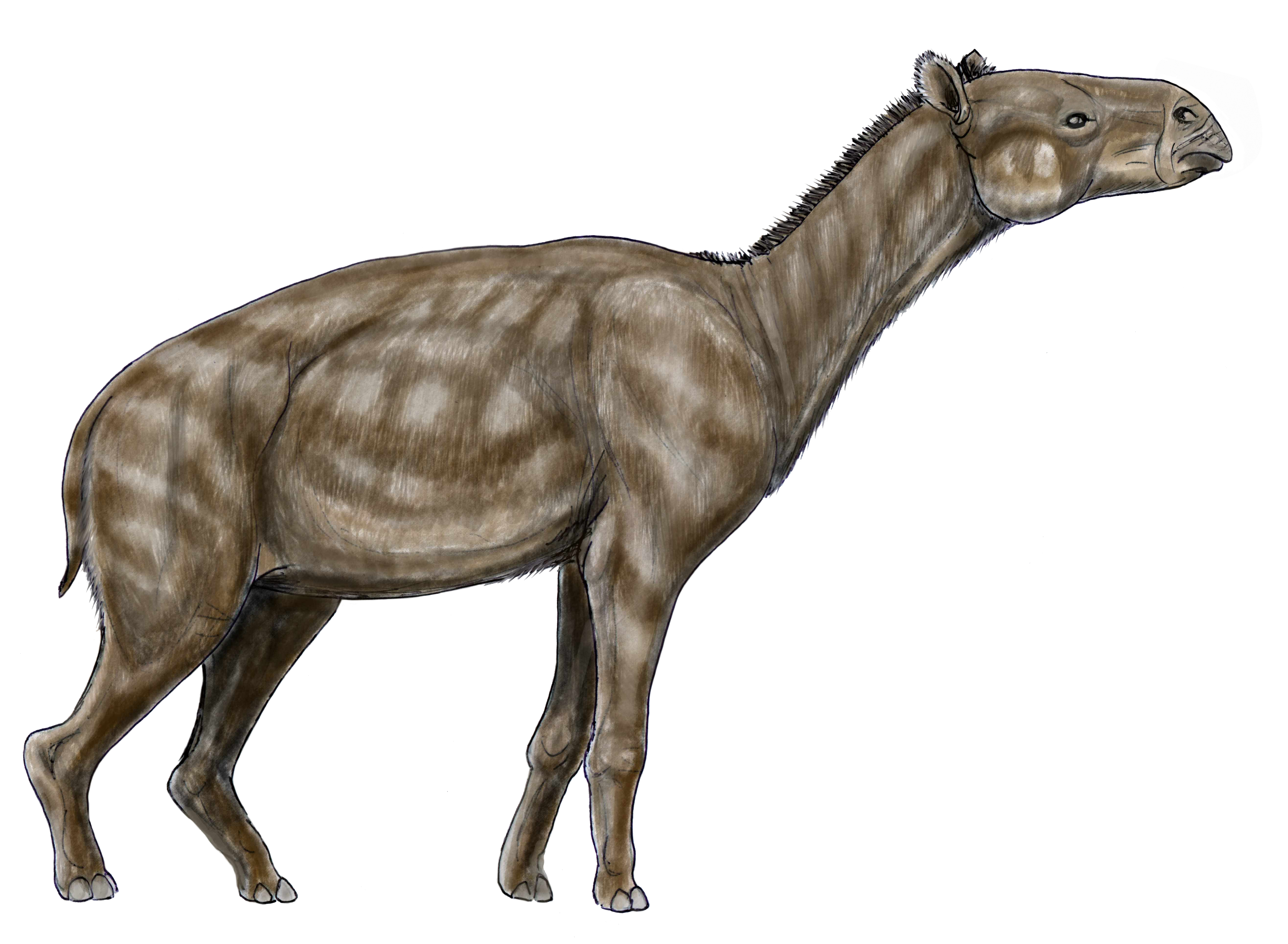
Life restoration of Palaeotherium magnum

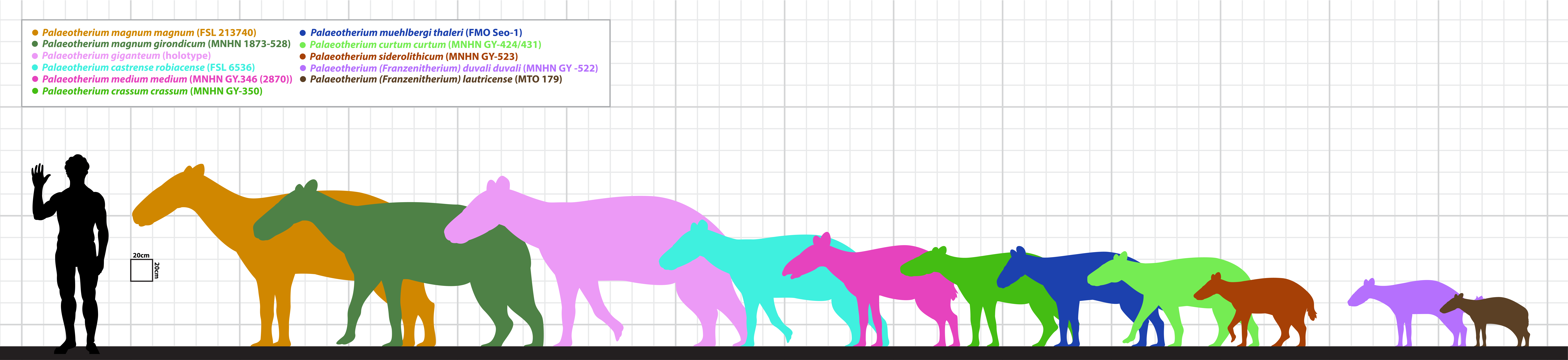
Size comparison show the range of size of various species of Palaeotherium

Palaeotheres ranged widely in size, from small species like Palaeotherium lautricense, which is estimated to have only weighed 36 kg (79 lb) to large species like Palaeotherium magnum, which are comparable in size to living equines, with body masses over 200 kg (440 lb). Their teeth are brachydont (low crowned). According to Danilo et al. 2013., paleotheriids are distinguished from other equoids by one unambiguous synapomorphy "the nasal notch opening distally to the canine, above the postcanine diastema" and two unambiguous character state changes "an average metaconule on [the fourth premolar]" and "an oblique metastyle on [the first and second molars]".

== Taxonomy ==
Palaeotheriidae is generally divided into the subfamilies Palaeotheriinae and 'Pachynolophinae'. The two groups are distinguished by the morphology of their upper molars, with mesostyles being at least moderately developed in those Palaeotheriinae, but generally weakly developed or absent in those of 'Pachylophinae'. 'Pachylophinae' is controversial with regards to its definition and phylogenetic placement. 'Pachylophinae', along with the genus Pachynolophus has been argued to be a paraphyletic group that is ancestral to Palaeotheriinae.

== Ecology ==
Early members of the family are suggested to have been frugivores, with later, larger members suggested to be browsers.

== Extinction ==
Evidence suggests that palaeotheriids went extinct in Eurasia during the Early Oligocene, approximately 33 Ma, as part of a faunal turnover event known as the Grande Coupure. The Eocene-Oligocene transition marked a significant global cooling event caused by the onset of Antarctic glaciation. This resulted in drier and more open habitats dominating the early Oligocene, and the loss of the dense forests that characterised the Eocene epoch. This environmental change, coupled with the arrival of new and better-adapted mammalian groups from Asia, triggered a decline in endemic European mammal groups such as Palaeotheriidae and Anoplotheriidae. In the Hampshire Basin of southern England the last record of Palaeotheriidae is from the Lower Hamstead Mbr. of the Bouldnor Formation, dating to approximately 33.6 Ma.

== Fossil distribution ==
- Creechbarrow Hill Site, Dorset, England
- Geiseltal, Mittelkohle, Zone III, Saxony-Anhalt, Germany
- Egerkingen, Alpha & Beta fissures, Baselland, Switzerland
- La Debruge, Provence-Alpes-Côte d'Azur Region, France
- The Caucasus Mountains in Georgia

== See also ==
- Evolution of the horse
