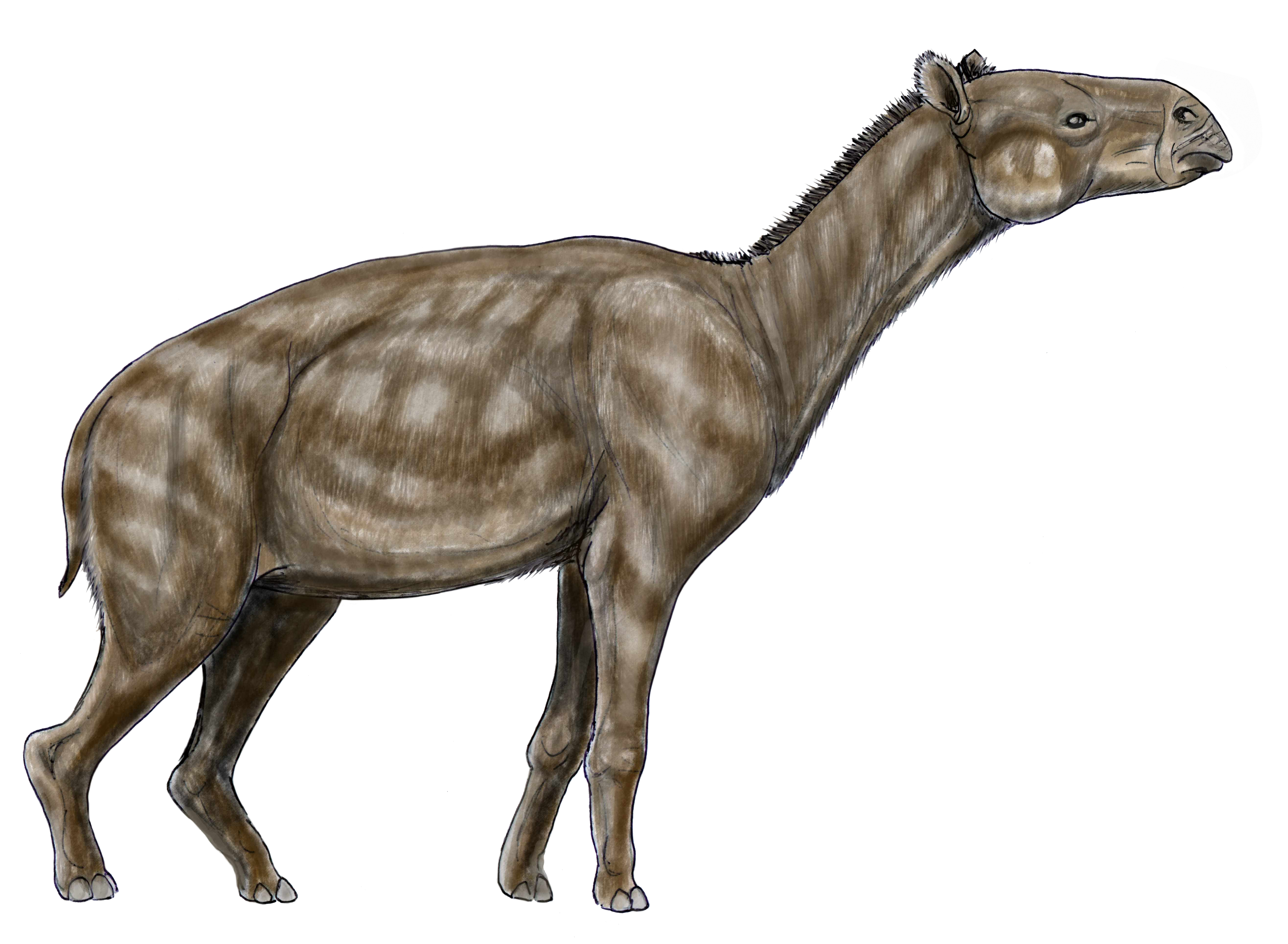
- Restoration of Palaeotherium magnum
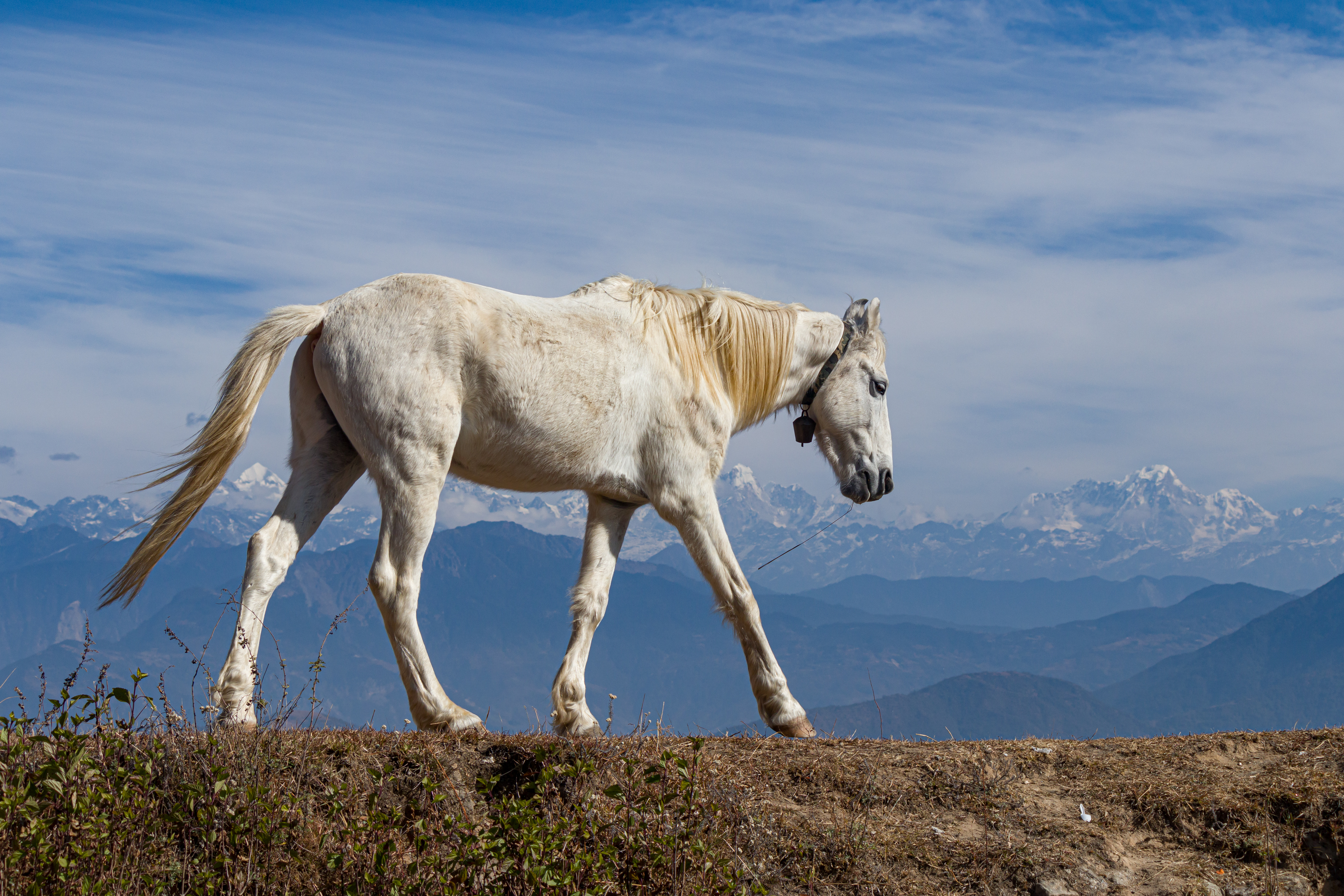
- Domestic horse (Equus caballus)

Scientific classification
- Kingdom: Animalia
- Phylum: Chordata
- Class: Mammalia
- Order: Perissodactyla
- Suborder: Hippomorpha
- Superfamily: Equoidea; Hay, 1902

Families
- Equidae; †Palaeotheriidae

= Equoidea =

Equoidea Temporal range: Late Paleocene–Holocene

Clade of superfamilies of mammals

Equoidea is a superfamily of hippomorph perissodactyls containing the Equidae, Palaeotheriidae, and other basal equoids of unclear affinities, of which members of the genus Equus are the only extant species. The earliest fossil record of the Equoidea proves unclear, but they possibly could have originated during the late Paleocene in Europe or Asia. Definite fossil records of equoids are recorded by the earliest Eocene, in which the earliest equids in North America and basal equoids of unclear affinities in Europe both appeared. Palaeotheres are thought to have originated later in the early Eocene of Europe, although some researchers disagree on whether the subfamily Pachynolophinae belongs to the Palaeotheriidae.

Equoids may in part be defined by dental synapomorphies from its molars. Equoids were originally brachyodont (low-crowned) in dentition, but the morphologies of their molars had changed to adapt to different diets. Living equids are hypsodont, the result of evolutionary adaptations towards grazing diets.
