= Quercy Phosphorites Formation =

Geologic formation and lagerstätte in Occitanie, France

- Stratigraphic range: Latest Bartonian-Late Oligocene; ~38–25 Ma
- Type: Formation
- Overlies: Fissure fillings in karstified Jurassic and Triassic rocks

Lithology
- Primary: Phosphorite

Location
- Coordinates: 44.3°N 1.6°E
- Approximate paleocoordinates: 42.8°N 2.0°W
- Region: Occitanie
- Country: France

Type section
- Named for: Quercy
- Named by: Thévenin
- Year defined: 1903
- Quercy Phosphorites Formation (France)

The Quercy Phosphorites Formation (French: Phosphorites du Quercy; Occitan: Fosforits de Quercy) is a geologic formation and lagerstätte in Occitanie, southern France. It preserves fossils dated to the Paleogene period (latest Bartonian to Late Oligocene), or MP16 to MP28 zones of the European land mammal age classification, ranging from approximately 38 to 25 Ma.

It qualifies as a Lagerstätte because beside a large variety of mammals, birds, turtles, crocodiles, flora and insects, it also preserves the soft tissues of amphibians and squamates, in addition to their articulated skeleton in what has been called natural mummies.

The genera Quercylurus, Quercymegapodius, Quercypsitta, Quercypodargus, Quercycerta and Quercygama, and species Mosaicomeryx quercyi, Robiacina quercyi, Palaeophyllophora quercyi, Archaeomys quercyi, Eomys quercyi, Eucricetodon quercyi and Tarnomys quercynus, as well as the lizards Paraplacosauriops quercyi and Pseudolacerta quercyini and the insect Palaeortona quercyensis were named after the formation.

== Description ==
The first phosphate deposits in Quercy were discovered in 1869 and published by Daubré and Trutat independently in 1871. The first fossils from the formation were described by Delfortie (1872) and Gervais in the same year and extensively studied by Filhol from 1877 onwards. The first geologic investigation of the formation was performed by Thévenin in 1903, and apart from a description by Gèze in 1938, the paleontological richness was not studied until a team of researchers of the Universities of Montpellier and Paris visited the site in 1965.

The karstified phosphate deposits are found from the Lot and Célé river valleys in the north to the left bank of the Aveyron in the south and from the Villefranche Fault in the east to the lacustrine deposits of the Aquitaine Basin in the west. The formation is found in fissures (karst) incising Jurassic and Triassic rocks east of Cahors. The age of the fossiliferous unit, in which almost 12,000 specimens were found ranges from the MP16 to MP28 zones of the European land mammal age classification. These ages correspond to the latest Bartonian to Chattian, from about 38 to 25 Ma.

== Paleontological significance ==
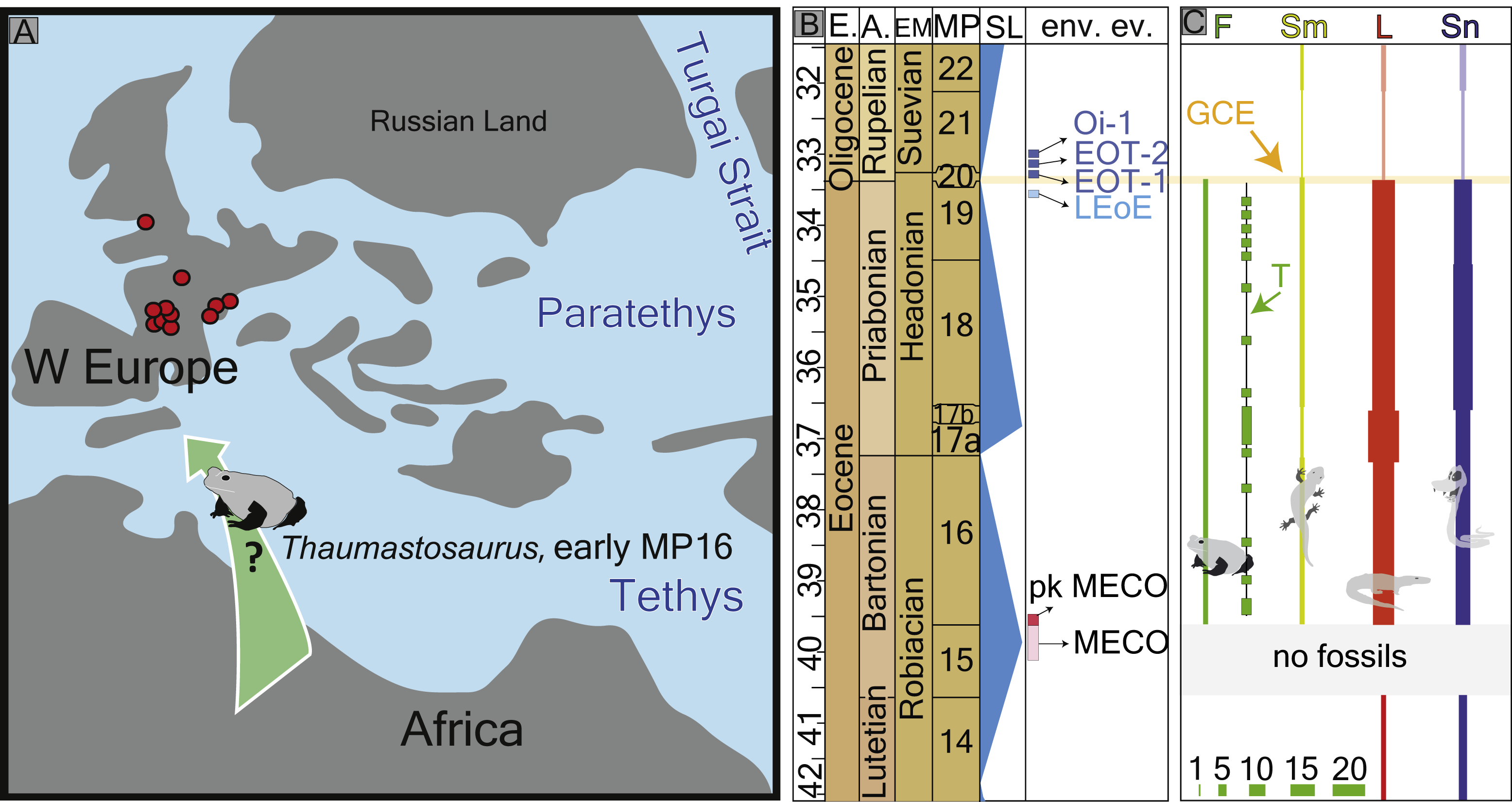
Paleogeography of the Late Eocene to Oligocene with biodiversity of the Quercy Phosphorites

The Quercy Phosphorites Formation is a highly fossiliferous unit designated as a Lagerstätte due to the excellent preservation of fossils. The phosphorite conserves up to the nerves, digestive tract and stomach content, insect larvae and other elements of the paleobiology in the formation. Nearly all Quercy fly pupae were preserved as isolated endocasts, of which many were still covered by the puparium, the hardened skin of the last larval instar. The formation also straddles the Grande Coupure and shows diversity changes (number of species) of frog, salamander, lizard and snake fossil records across the formation. It is assumed that the Quercy arthropods fossilized by a rapid fixation by phosphate-rich water followed by encrustation and mineralization.

== Paleofauna ==
The following fossils have been reported from the formation:

=== Mammals ===
Color key: Taxon / Reclassified taxon / Taxon falsely reported as present / Dubious taxon or junior synonym / Ichnotaxon / Ootaxon / Morphotaxon	Notes; Uncertain or tentative taxa are in small text; ~~crossed out~~ taxa are discredited.

==== Apatemyidae ====
Genus	Species	Location	Time	Material	Note	Images
Chardinyus	C. sp.				An apatotheria.	
Heterohyus	H. (Chardinyus) nanus				An apatemyid.	
Heterohyus	H. (Gervaisyus) pygmaeus				An apatemyid.	
Gervaisyus	G. sp.					

==== Artiodactyls ====
Genus	Species	Location	Time	Material	Notes	Images
Bachitherium	B. guirounetensis					
Bachitherium	B. lavocati					
Cryptomeryx	C. gaudryi					
Dichobune	D. sigei					
Dichodon	D. vidalenci					
Iberomeryx	I. matsoui					
Mosaicomeryx	M. quercyi					
Paroxacron	P. bergeri					
Plesiomeryx	P. cadurcensis					
Prodremotherium	P. elongatum					
Pseudamphimeryx	P. salesmei					
Robiacina	R. lavergnensis					
Robiacina	R. quercyi					
Tapirulus	T. perrierensis					

==== Carnivora ====
Genus	Species	Location	Time	Material	Notes	Images
Amphicynodon	A. typicus	Pech Crabet locality	Oligocene	Two hemi-mandibles	An early amphicynodontidae caniform	
Cephalogale	C. sp.			A piece of hemi-mandible		
Cynodyctis	C. lacustris neboulensis	Sainte Néboule		A mandible	An amphicynodontidae caniform.	
Dinailurictis	D. bonali	La Tuque	Oligocene.	Several holotypes consist of a fragment of the left upper canine, lower canine, distal right humerus, distal left ulna, and a proximal piece of the right femur.	A nimravid felidae	
Eofelis	E. edwardsii				A nimravid	
Eofelis	E. giganteus	Phosphorites du Quercy		A mandible	A nimravid	
Eofelis	cf. E. sp.				A nimravid	
Eusmilus	E. bidentatus		Eocene/Oligocene	A edentulous hemi-mandible and a fragment of upper canine	A nimravid	
Huntictis	H. minima	Gardiol 3 locality	Early Oligocene	A holotype consists of a dentition.	A small musteloid	
Mustelictis	M. cf. major			A part of right hemi-mandible with alveolus of p1, p2, fragments of p3 roots, and p4-m1.		
Mustelictis	M. aff. olivieri			A holotype specimen consists of a skull and a hemi-mandible.		
Nimravus	N. intermedius	MP 22 localities, La Plante2, Mas de Got and Valbro localities	Oligocene	A left hemi-mandible with m1	A nimravid felidae.	
Pachycynodon	P. amphictina		Oligocene	Multiple specimens consist of hemi-mandible and dentitions.		
Pachycynodon	P. crassirostris		Oligocene	Multiple specimens consist of hemi-mandible and dentitions.		
Pachycynodon	P. cf. dubius		Oligocene	Multiple specimens consist of hemi-mandible and dentitions.		
Pachycynodon	P. cf. filholi		Oligocene	Multiple specimens consist of hemi-mandible and dentitions.		
Palaeogale	P. sectoria	Valbro locality	Oligocene	A specimen consists of p4 dentition.	An early feliformia	
Peignictis	P. pseudamphictis	Valbro locality	Early Oligocene	A posterior part of hemi-mandible	A carnivoran with uncertain affinities	
Quercylurus	Q. major	Phosphorites du Quercy	Oligocene	A maxilla	A nimravid	
Storchictis	S. miacinus	Phosphorites du Quercy	Late Eocene	A mandible	An Amphicyonidae	
Wangictis	W. tedfordi	Phosphorites du Quercy	Early Oligocene	A left hemi-mandible with c-m2	An Amphicynodontidae	

==== Chiroptera ====
Genus	Species	Location	Time	Material	Notes	Images
Hipposideros	H. pseudorhinolophus sehlosseri				An early roundleaf bat.	
Hipposideros	H. pseudorhinolophus trassounius				An early roundleaf bat.	
Hipposideros	H. pseudorhinolophus zbrjdi				An early roundleaf bat.	
Leuconoe	L. lavocati				An early vespertilionid bat.	
Palaeophyllophora	P. oltina				An early hipposiderid bat.	
Palaeophyllophora	P. quercyi				An early hipposiderid bat.	
Stehlinia	S. bonisi				An early natalidae bat	
Stehlinia	S. minor				An early natalidae bat	
Vaylatsia	V. garouillasensis					
Vespertiliavus	V. gerscheli				An early Emballonurid bat	
Vespertiliavus	V. gracilis				An early Emballonurid bat	
Vespertiliavus	V. lapradensis				An early Emballonurid bat	

==== Creodonta ====
Genus	Species	Location	Time	Material	Images
Paracynohyaenodon	P. magnus				
Parapterodon	P. lostangensis				

==== Euarchonta ====
Genus	Species	Location	Time	Material	Images
Darbonetus	D. aubrelongensis				

==== Hyaenodonta ====
Genus	Species	Location	Time	Material	Notes	Images
Paroxyaena	P. pavlovi	Phosphorites du Quercy	Late Eocene	A partial skull	A hyaenodont	

==== Lipotyphla ====
Genus	Species	Location	Time	Material	Notes	Images
Amphidozotherium	A. cayluxi					
Darbonetus	D. aubrelongensis					
Darbonetus	D. tuberi					
Myxomygale	M. antiqua					
Saturninia	S. beata					
Saturninia	S. pelissiei					

==== Marsupials ====
Genus	Species	Location	Time	Material	Notes	Images
Amphiperatherium	A. bourdellense	Le Bretou Locality	Oligocene			
Amphiperatherium	A. lamandini	Le Bretou Locality	Oligocene			
Amphiperatherium	A. minutum	Le Bretou Locality	Oligocene			
Peratherium	P. bretouense					
Peratherium	P. cayluxi					
Peratherium	P. lavergnense					
Peratherium	P. perrierense					

==== Perissodactyls ====
Genus	Species	Location	Time	Material	Images
Pachynolophus	P. bretovense				

==== Primates ====
Genus	Species	Location	Time	Material	Images
Cryptadapis	C. tertius			An adapiform primate.	

==== Proeutheria ====
Genus	Species	Location	Time	Material	Notes	Images
Pseudorhyncocyon	P. cayluxi					

==== Rodents ====
Genus	Species	Location	Time	Material	Notes	Images
Archaeomys	A. intermedius	Pech du Fraysse	Oligocene		A theridomyidae rodent	
Archaeomys	A. quercyi		Oligocene		A theridomyidae rodent	
Bernardia	B. marandati					
Blainvillimys	B. gemellus					
Blainvillimys	B. gousnatensis					
Blainvillimys	B. langei					
Blainvillimys	B. rotundidens					
Elfomys	E. medius					
Eomys	E. gigas	Pech du Fraysse Locality	Late Oligocene	A specimen	An eomyidae rodent	
Eomys	E. minus	Pech du Fraysse Locality	Late Oligocene	A specimen	An eomyidae rodent	
Eomys	E. quercyi	Pech du Fraysse Locality	Late Oligocene	A specimen	An eomyidae rodent	E. quercyi
Eucricetodon	E. atavus					
Eucricetodon	E. quercyi					
Gliravus	G. garouillensis					
Gliravus	G. itardiensis					
Issiodoromys	I. limognensis					
Issiodoromys	I. pauffiensis					
Palaeosciurus	P. goti					
Paradelomys	Paradelomys spelaeus					
Patriotheridcmys	P. altus					
Patriotheridcmys	P. altus neboulensis					
Patriotheridcmys	P. sudrei					
Pseudoltinomys	P. gaillardi					
Pseudoltinomys	P. major					
Pseudoltinomys	P. phosphoricus					
Sciuromys	S. cayluxi					
Sciuromys	S. rigali					
Tarnomys	T. quercynus					
Theridomys	T. ludensis					

=== Birds ===
Genus	Species	Location	Time	Material	Note	Images
Ameghinornis	A. minor	Phosphorites du Quercy	Late Eocene	A specimen	An early european seriema	
Euronyctibius	E. kurochkini	Phosphorites du Quercy	Eocene	A right humerus	An early nightjar	
Horusornis	H. vianeyliaudae	La Bouffie Locality	Eocene	A specimen	An early accipitriformes	
Dynamopterus	D. velox	Near Caylus	Oligocene	Almost complete right humerus	An extinct cuckoo bird, synonymous with Dynamopterus velox	
Itardiornis	I. hessae		Eocene/Oligocene	A specimen	A Messelornithidae bird	
Leptoganga	L. sp.					
Necrobyas	N. minimus					
Nocturnavis	N. sp.					
Palaeoglaux	P. perrierensis				An early owl	
Palaeotodus	P. escampsiensis		Late Eocene	A specimen	An early todies	
Palaeotodus	P. itardiensis		Early Oligocene	A specimen	An early todies	
Paleseyvus	P. escampensis					
Primocolius	P. sigei	Le Bretou locality	Eocene	A limb element consists of a practically complete left humerus		
Primocolius	P. minor		Eocene	A near-complete right tarsometatarsal		
Quercymegapodius	Q. brodkorbi				A Quercymegapodiidae bird	
Quercypodargus	Q. olsoni					
Quercypsitta	Q. ivani	La Bouffie locality	Late Eocene	A holotype specimen consists of three coracoids	An early offshoots of parrot	
Quercypsitta	Q. sudrei	La Bouffie locality	Late Eocene	Fragmentary sets of postcrania, which consist of foot and wing bones	An early offshoots of parrot	
Recurvirostra	R. sanctaeneboulae					
Strigogyps	S. dubius	Phosphorites du Quercy	Late Eocene	A specimen		
Sylphornis	S. bretouensis					
Ventivorus	V. ragei	Le Bertou Locality			An early nightjar	

=== Reptiles ===
==== Crocodilians ====
Genus	Species	Location	Time	Material	Notes	Images
Arambourgia	A. gaudryi					

==== Lizards ====
Genus	Species	Location	Time	Material	Notes	Images
Ayalasaurus	A. tenuis					Bauersaurus cosensis
Bauersaurus	B. cosensis	Cos Locality	Uppermost Early Eocene	The upper maxilla) and lower jaw fragments.	A pan-gekkotan lizard.	Bauersaurus cosensis
Brevisaurus	B. smithi					Bauersaurus cosensis
Cadurciguana	C. hoffstetteri					Bauersaurus cosensis
Cadurcogekko	C. piveteaui					Bauersaurus cosensis
Cadurcopanoplos	C. vaylatsensis	La Bouffie locality	Late Eocene	Two holotypes consist of a single incomplete frontal bone and a partial right mandible.	A Glyptosaurinae anguid.	Bauersaurus cosensis
Dracaenosaurus	D. croizeti					Bauersaurus cosensis
Eurheloderma	E. gallicum					Bauersaurus cosensis
Geiseltaliellus	G. lamandini				An early iguanian lizard	Bauersaurus cosensis
Lavergnesaurus	L. lamarcki	Lavergne	Bartonian	A left dentary	An early skink	Bauersaurus cosensis
Mediolacerta	M. roceki					Bauersaurus cosensis
Necrosaurus	N. cayluxi					Bauersaurus cosensis
Necrosaurus	N. eucarinatus					Bauersaurus cosensis
Omoiotyphlops	O. priscus					Bauersaurus cosensis
Paraplacosauriops	P. quercyi					Bauersaurus cosensis
Phosphoriguana	P. peritechne	La Bouffie Locality	Late Eocene	A single partial lower jaw	A probable member of pleurodonta	Bauersaurus cosensis
Placosaurus	P. rugosus					Bauersaurus cosensis
Placosaurus	P. sp.					Bauersaurus cosensis
Plesiolacerta	P. lydekkeri					Bauersaurus cosensis
Pseudeumeces	P. cadurcensis					Bauersaurus cosensis
Pseudolacerta	P. mucronata					Bauersaurus cosensis
Pseudolacerta	P. quercyini					Bauersaurus cosensis
Quercycerta	Q. maxima					Bauersaurus cosensis
Quercygama	Q. galliae		Middle Eocene	A cranial material consists of a skull	An early relatives of wall lizards	Bauersaurus cosensis
Timon	T. planeutes					Bauersaurus cosensis
Uromastyx	U. europaeus				An early spiny-tailed lizard	Bauersaurus cosensis

==== Snakes ====
Genus	Species	Location	Time	Material	Notes	Images
Cadurcoboa	C. insolita					
Coluber	C. cadurci					
Dunnophis	D. cadurcensis					
Eoanilius	E. europae					
Natrix	N. mlynarskii					
Palaeopython	P. cadurcensis					
Palaeopython	P. filholi					
Palaeopython	P. neglectus					
Paleryx	P. cayluxi					
Platyspondylia	P. lepta					
Plesiotortrix	P. edwardsi					

==== Turtles ====
Genus	Species	Location	Time	Material	Notes	Images
Ptychogaster	P. cayluxensis					
Testudinidae	indeterminate					
Testudo	T. phosphoritarum					

=== Amphibians ===
Frogs

Genus	Species	Location	Time	Material	Notes	Images
Bufo	B. serratus	Phosphorites du Quercy	Eocene	A specimen	An early true toad.	
Thaumastosaurus	T. bottii	Phosphorites du Quercy	Eocene	A specimen	An early Pyxicephalinae frog	
Thaumastosaurus	T. gezei	Phosphorites du Quercy	Eocene	A mummified preserved skeleton	An early Pyxicephalinae frog	

Salamanders

Genus	Species	Location	Time	Material	Notes	Images
Heteroclitotriton	H. zitteli	Phosphorites du Quercy locality	Late Eocene	A specimen	An early salamander	
Megalotriton	M. filholi	Phosphorites du Quercy locality	Late Eocene	A specimen	An extinct salamander	
Megalotriton	M. portisi	Phosphorites du Quercy locality	Late Eocene	A specimen	An extinct salamander	
Phosphotriton	P. sigei	Phosphorites du Quercy locality	Late Eocene	A mummified skeleton.	A frog-eating salamander.	Exceptional preservation of nerves, digestive tract and stomachal content in the frog-eating salamander Phosphotriton sigei

=== Insects ===
==== Blattodea ====
Family	Genus	Species	Location	Age	Notes	Images
					Various cockroaches	

==== Diptera ====
Family	Genus	Species	Location	Age	Notes	Images
					Various flies	

==== Coleoptera ====
Family	Genus	Species	Location	Age	Notes	Images
Histeridae	†Onthophilus	†O. intermedius			A clown beetle	
					Various beetles	

==== Hymenoptera ====
Family	Genus	Species	Location	Age	Notes	Images
Diapriidae	†Coptera	†C. anka	Near Bach	Paleogene	An early Diapriinae wasp	
Diapriidae	†Palaeortona	†P. quercyensis	Near Bach	Paleogene	An early Diapriinae wasp	
Diapriidae	†Xenomorphia	†X. handschini	Near Bach	Paleogene	An early Diapriinae wasp	
Diapriidae	†Xenomorphia	†X. resurrecta	Near Bach	Paleogene	An early Diapriinae wasp	
					Various wasps/ants/bees	

==== Lepidoptera ====
Family	Genus	Species	Location	Age	Notes	Images
					Various butterflies/moths	

==== Orthoptera ====
Family	Genus	Species	Location	Age	Notes	Images
					Various ensiferan grasshoppers/katydids	

==== Myriapoda ====
Family	Genus	Species	Location	Age	Notes	Images
					Various centipedes and millipedes	

== Flora ==
Family	Genus	Species	Location	Age	Notes	Images
Anacardiaceae	Indeterminate	Indeterminate			Indeterinate anacardiaceous fossils	
Arecaceae	Palmocaulon	Palmocaulon sp.			A palm tree relative	
Malvaceae	Indeterminate	Indeterminate			indeterminate malvaceous fossils	
Menispermaceae	Indeterminate	Indeterminate			Indeterminate menispermaceous fossils	
Sapotaceae	Indeterminate	Indeterminate			Indeterminate sapotaceous fossils	
Ulmaceae	Indeterminate	Indeterminate			Indeterminate ulmaceous fossils	
Vitaceae	Indeterminate	Indeterminate			Indeterminate vitaceous fossils	
Indeterminate	Indeterminate	Indeterminate			Indeterminate caryophyllalean fossils	
