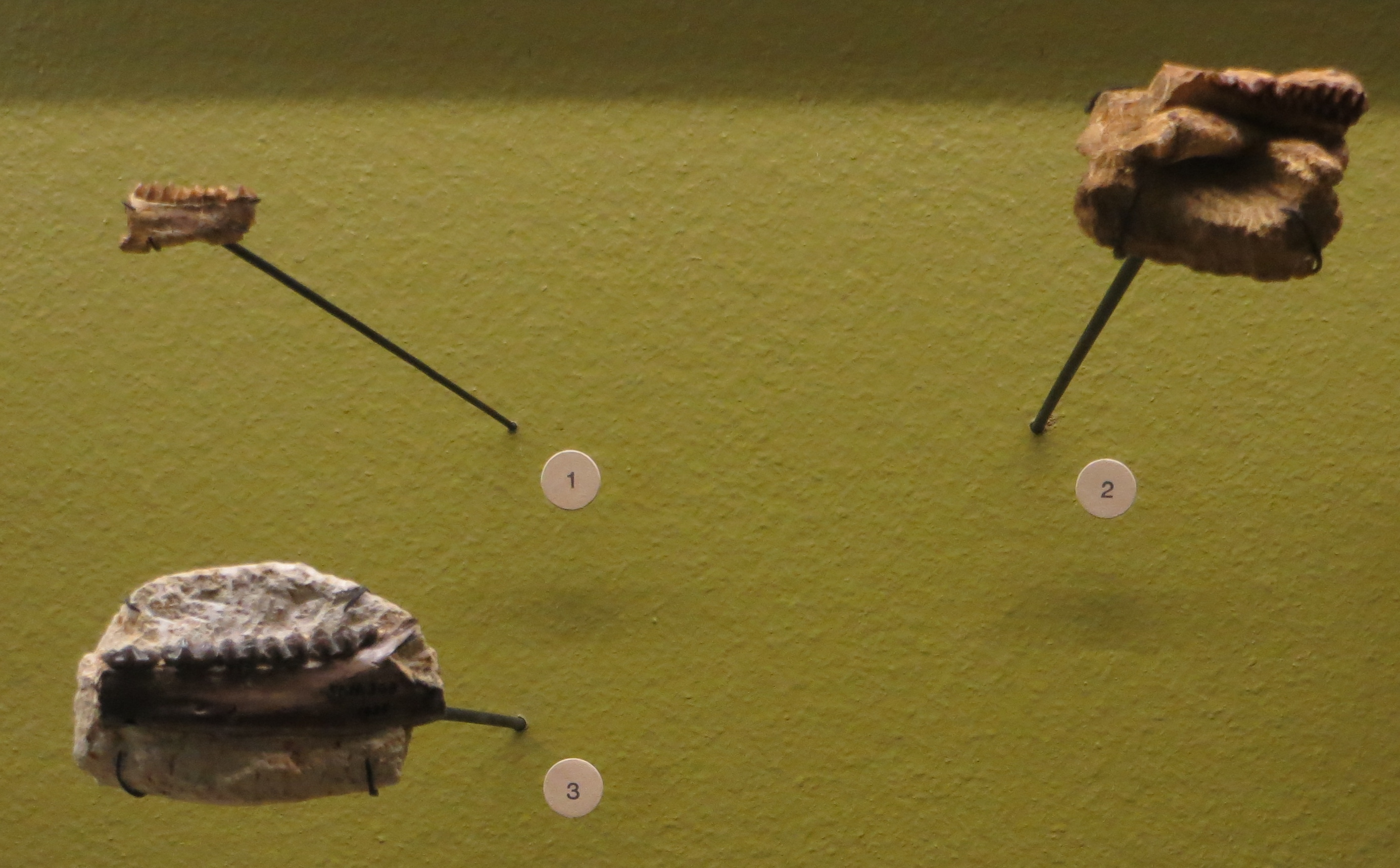
- Dichodon spp. dental remains, Natural History Museum of Basel (clockwise from top left) - D. ruetimeyeri, D. sp., D. cervinum

Scientific classification
- Kingdom: Animalia
- Phylum: Chordata
- Class: Mammalia
- Order: Artiodactyla
- Family: †Xiphodontidae
- Genus: †Dichodon; Owen, 1848

Type species
- †Dichodon cuspidatum Owen, 1848

Other species
- †D. cervinum Owen, 1841; †D. frohnstettensis Meyer, 1852; †D. simplex Kowalevsky, 1874; †D. cartieri Rütimeyer, 1891; †D. subtilis Stehlin, 1910; †D. ruetimeyeri Stehlin, 1910; †D. lugdunensis Sudre, 1972; †D. stehlini Sudre, 1973; †D. vidalenci? Sudre, 1988; †D. biroi Hooker & Weidmann, 2000

Synonyms
- Genus synonymy: Tetraselenodon Schlosser, 1886; Synonyms of D. cervinum: Tetraselenodon Kowalevskii Schlosser, 1886

= Dichodon (mammal) =

Dichodon Temporal range: Middle–Late Eocene (Lutetian to Priabonian) 43.5–33.9 Ma

Extinct genus of endemic Palaeogene European artiodactyls

Dichodon is an extinct genus of Palaeogene artiodactyls belonging to the family Xiphodontidae. It was endemic to Western Europe and lived from the middle to late Eocene. The genus was first erected by the British naturalist Richard Owen in 1848 based on dental remains from the fossil beds in Hordle, England. He noticed similar dentitions to contemporary artiodactyls like those of the Anoplotheriidae and Dichobunidae and references the name of the genus Dichobune. Eventually, it was found to be more closely related to Xiphodon and now includes 11 species, although one of them may be synonymous.

Dichodon had brachyodont (low-crowned) dentition, its premolars being elongated similar to other xiphodonts. However, it differs from them by the generally stronger but varied degrees of elongation of the premolars and "molarization" of the fourth premolars, in which the earliest species had triangular top fourth premolars while later species had quadrangular ones. Its snout is also shorter and narrower compared to that of Xiphodon. The different morphologies of the two genera suggest different dietary specializations of folivory (leaf-eating), but the postcranial morphology of Dichodon remains poorly known compared to that of Xiphodon.

Dichodon lived in western Europe when it was an archipelago that was isolated from the rest of Eurasia, meaning that it lived in a tropical-subtropical environment with various other animals that also evolved with strong levels of endemism. The genus was speciose, composed of many small-sized species as well as medium-sized ones. D. cuspidatum and D. stehlini were especially large but are known only from single fossil localities. The small-sized D. frohnstettensis and the medium-sized D. cervinum, in comparison, frequently occur in many localities dating from the late middle to late Eocene.

It and other xiphodont genera went extinct by the Grande Coupure extinction/faunal turnover event, coinciding with shifts towards further glaciation and seasonality plus dispersals of Asian immigrant faunas into western Europe. The causes of its extinction are attributed to negative interactions with immigrant faunas (resource competition, predation), environmental turnover from climate change, or some combination of the two.

== Taxonomy ==
=== Research history ===
==== Early history ====
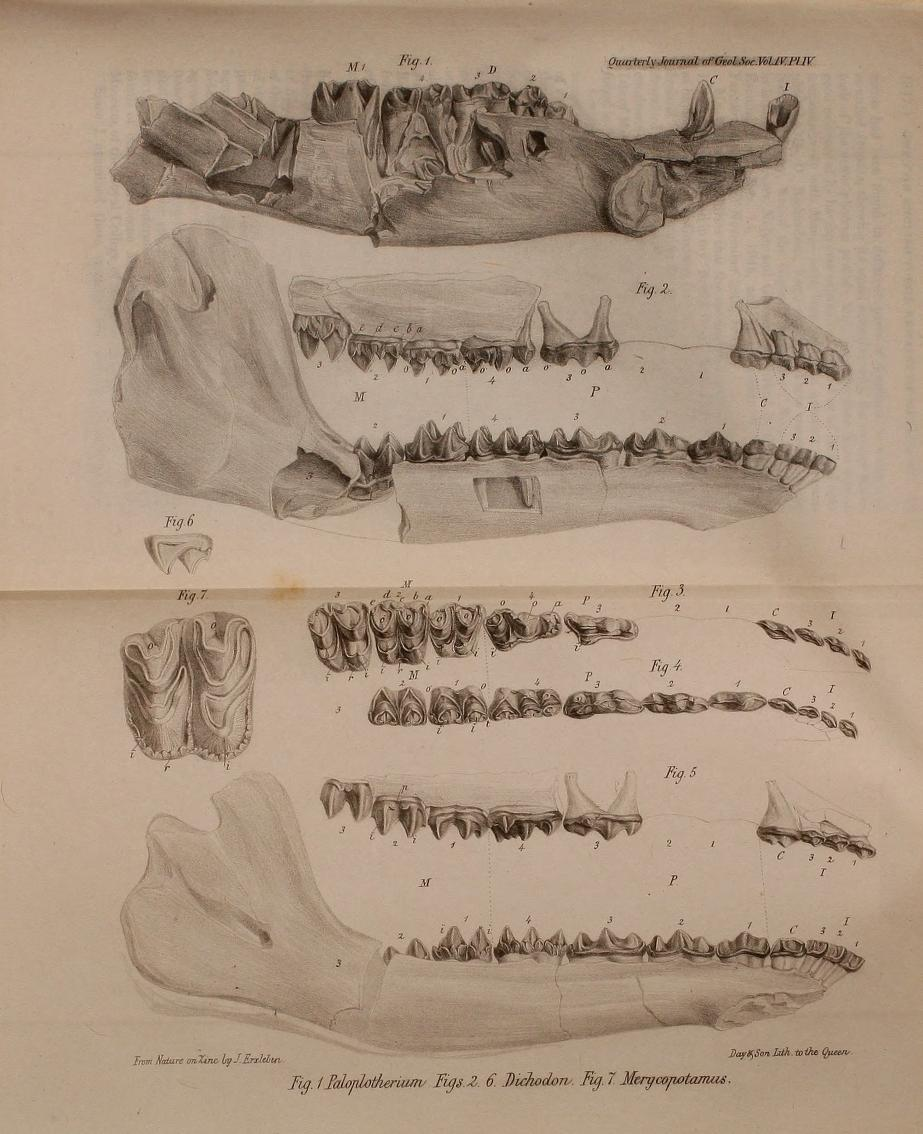
Jaws and dentition of Dichodon cuspidatum (Fig. 2-6), the type specimens for the species, as figured in 1848

In 1848, after having recognized ungulates as a taxonomic group defined by the Artiodactyla and Perissodactyla, British naturalist Richard Owen erected the genus Dichodon based on its "peculiar" dentition, classifying it as a member of the former. The dental and cranial fossils of Dichodon were uncovered were from the Eocene beds of Hordle, England by Alexander Pytts Falconer. Owen said that the dentition of Dichodon resembled those of both Merycopotamus and Dichobune because of the similar upper and lower jaws but also argued that the molars resembled those of anoplotheriids. Deriving it from the quantity and sharpness of the cusps of the teeth, he erected the binomial name Dichodon cuspidatus. The etymology of the genus name Dichodon is derived from the Ancient Greek words δίχα (two) and ὀδούς (tooth) in reference to the genus Dichobune, due to having similar molar mounds. Owen in 1857 then recorded that the fossils of Dichodon that he previously described from 1857-1858 were from an immature individual with milk teeth for a total of 32 teeth while the adult dentition based on fossils collected near Alum Bay in the Isle of Wight by a "Dr. Wright" had a complete dental set of 44 teeth.

In 1852, German palaeontologist Christian Erich Hermann von Meyer, writing to his colleague Heinrich Georg Bronn, told of fossils of Dichodon from the locality of Frohnstetten whose dentition did not resemble that of the species D. cuspidatus. He determined based on its molars that it was therefore a new species, which he named D. Frohnstettensis. (Note: Due to archaic species naming conventions, authors of the 19th and 20th centuries tended to capitalize species names based on individuals or places.)

In an 1874 monograph published in 1876, Russian palaeontologist Vladimir Kovalevsky recognized three valid species of Dichodon: D. cuspidatus, D. Valdense, and D. Frohnstettense. Kovalevsky apparently did not specify the attributed fossils and etymology of D. Valdense, but Swiss palaeontologist Hans Georg Stehlin in 1910 suggested that Kovalevsky based the species on fossils previously described, but not named, by François Jules Pictet de la Rive. He stated that there was a small-sized species from the Swiss locality of Egerkingen, that it was smaller than D. Frohnstettense and that it would have been roughly the size of Cainotherium. Deciding not to establish a new genus because of incomplete material, he assigned to Dichodon the species D. simplex based on the simplicity of the premolars. The same year, British naturalist William Henry Flower expressed doubt regarding whether Dichodon was distinct enough from Xiphodon based on the different last premolar morphologies.

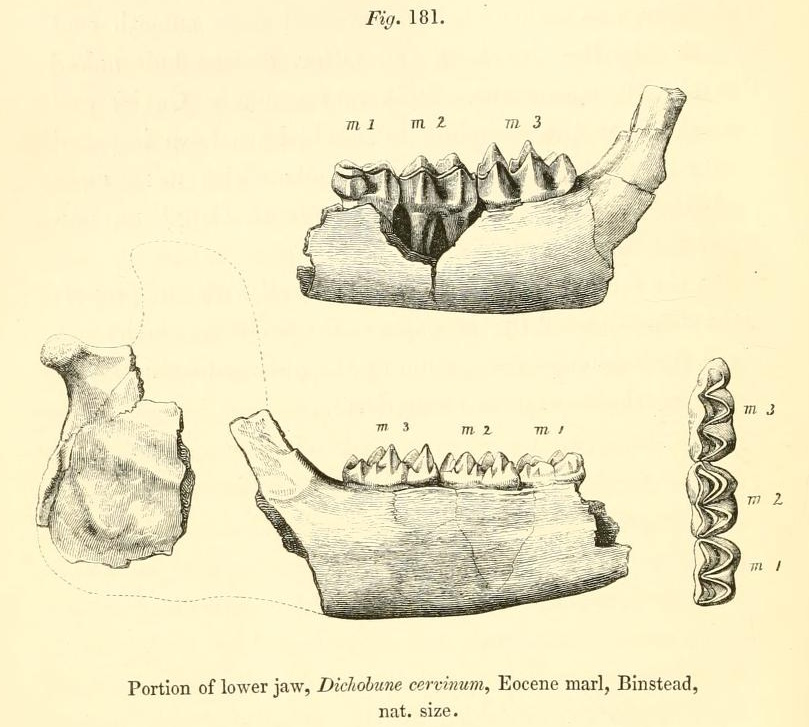
1846 illustration of the partial lower jaw bones of D. cervinum

In 1885, British naturalist Richard Lydekker taxonomically reviewed Dichodon and other artiodactyls. He confirmed that it had a complete dental formula, selenodont molars, and elongated premolars like Xiphodon but also noted that its limb anatomy was unknown. He referenced two species but did not give mention to the others: D. cuspidatus and D. cervinus, the latter of which was previously erected and classified to the genus Dichobune by Owen in 1841. German palaeontologist Max Schlosser established the binomial name Tetraselenodon Kowalevskii based on fossils from the French department of Tarn-et-Garonne in 1886. He justified the genus by arguing that Pictet incorrectly referred its fossil material to Dichodon due to the dentition being simple-looking in form.

The Swiss palaeontologist Ludwig Ruetimeyer in 1891 described another species from Egerkingen whose fossil remains were smaller than those of D. cuspidatus. He stated that the upper jaw molar row of the newer species measured 17 mm (0.67 in) to 20 mm (0.79 in) in length while its lower jaw molar row length measured 22 mm (0.87 in), in contrast to D. cuspidatus with an upper molar row length of 39 mm (1.5 in) and a lower molar row length of 44 mm (1.7 in). Ruetimeyer assigned it the species name D. Cartieri.

==== Later revisions ====
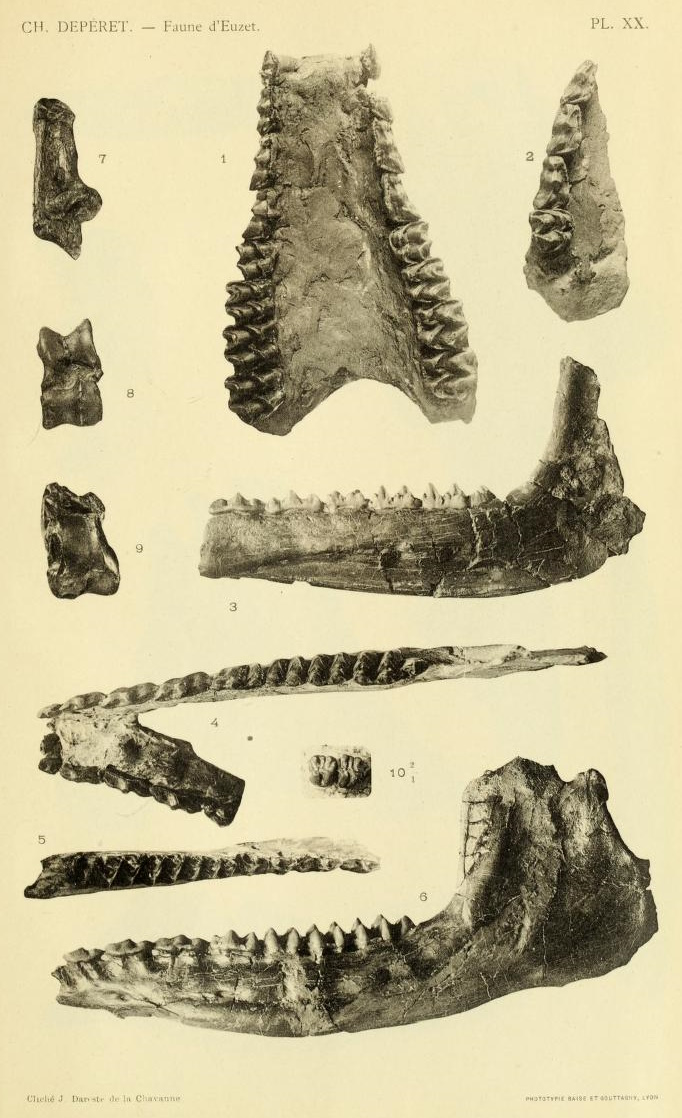
Cranial and postcranial fossils of D. cervinum as pictured in 1917

For his 1910 monograph on artiodactyls, Stehlin, as part of his work in reaffirming Catodontherium as a valid genus, said that D. valdense, despite being an older name than C. robiacense, may not have been clearly defined. He also supported the validities of the other species D. cuspidatum, D. cervinum, D. frohnstettense, D. simplex, and D. cartieri. The Swiss palaeontologist additionally erected two species of Dichodon: the first was D. subtile from the Swiss locality of Mormont, which he said was a small species differing from others by the elongation and narrowing of the premolars. The second that he recognized was D. Rütimeyeri from Egerkingen, which he said was about the same size as D. Cartieri. He also synonymized Tetraselenodon with Dichodon and invalidated T. Kowalevskyi because of the dentition's similarity to that of D. cervinum.

In 1972, the French palaeontologist Jean Sudre erected D. lugdunensis, another small-sized species, based on dentition from the French locality of Lissieu. He said that the new species would have been part of a different lineage from that of D. cartieri plus that it was larger than D. simplex. He also confirmed that T. kowalevski is a synonym of D. cervinum. The next year, Sudre named another species D. stehlini from a large-sized molar originally from the locality of La Débruge in France. All species of Dichodon previously recognized as valid since Stehlin's 1910 revisions were listed by Jerry J. Hooker in 1986, although he emended D. subtile to D. subtilis and D. frohnstettense to D. frohnstettensis out of correcting naming incongruencies.

In 1988, Sudre established another species named D. vidalenci based on isolated teeth from Le Bretou in France, which he noted had very elongated premolars, and listed Dichodon sp. based on isolated short premolars. Hooker and Marc Weidmann in 2000 listed D. vidalenci as a possible synonym of D. subtilis but otherwise listed all other species except for D. stehlini. In addition, they erected the medium-sized species D. biroi from the Swiss municipality of Éclépens, establishing that they named the species after Philippe Biro because he collected the dental holotype specimens in 1946.

=== Classification ===
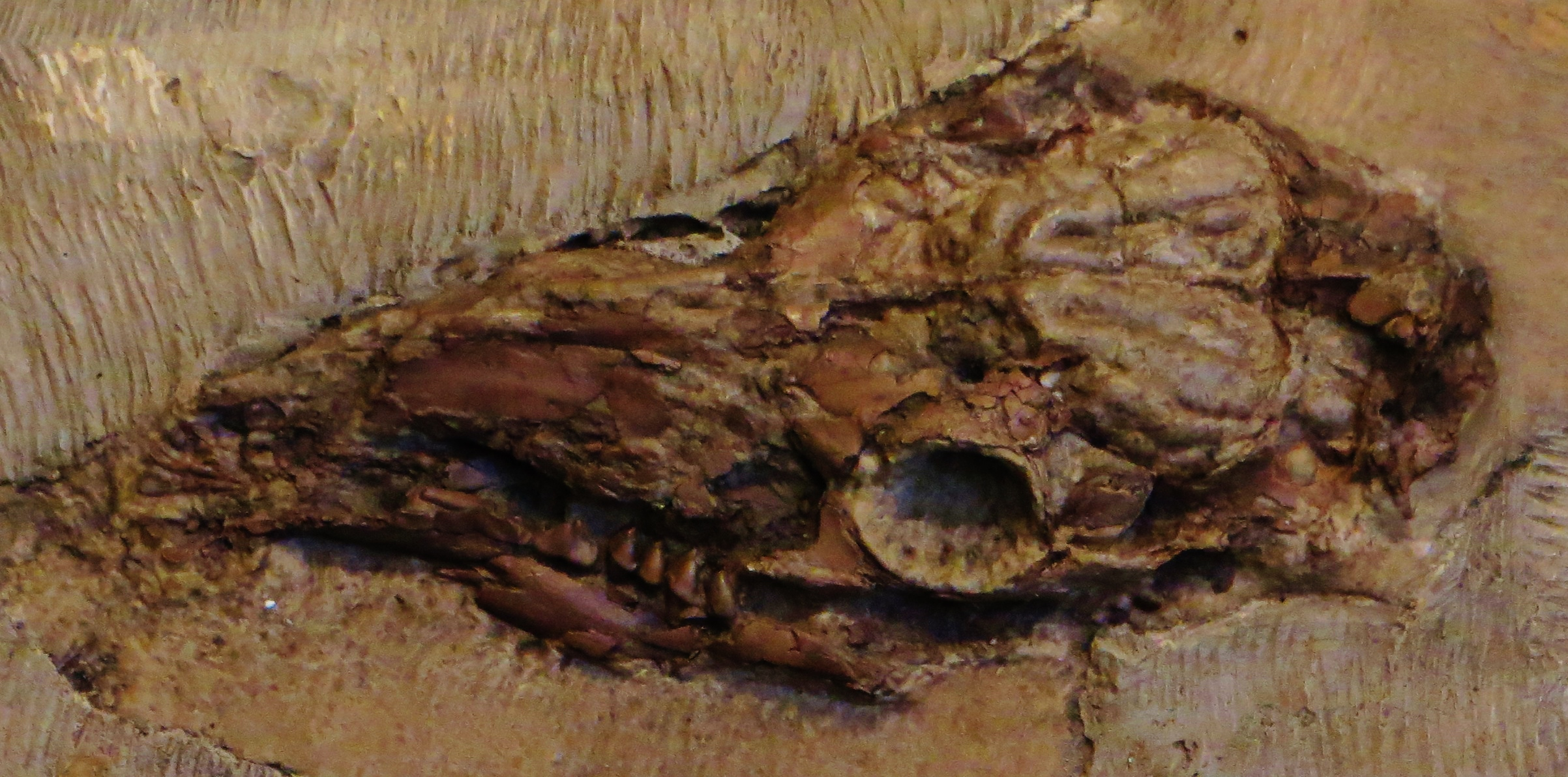
Skull of Xiphodon, a close relative to Dichodon, from the National Museum of Natural History, France

Dichodon belongs to the Xiphodontidae, a Palaeogene artiodactyl family endemic to western Europe that lived from the middle Eocene to the early Oligocene (~44 Ma to 33 Ma). It was suggested to have been a monotypic member of its own family, the Dichodontidae, by the American palaeontologist Edward Drinker Cope in 1889, although this is not accepted by modern authors. Like the other contemporary endemic artiodactyl families of western Europe, the evolutionary origins of the Xiphodontidae are poorly known. The Xiphodontidae is generally thought to have first appeared by MP14 faunal unit of the Mammal Palaeogene zones, making them the first representatives of artiodactyls with selenodont dentition to have appeared in the landmass along with the Amphimerycidae. More specifically, the first xiphodonts to appear were the genera Dichodon and Haplomeryx by MP14. Dichodon and Haplomeryx continued to persist into the late Eocene while Xiphodon made its first appearance by MP16. Another xiphodont, Paraxiphodon, is known to have occurred only in MP17a localities. The former three genera lived up to the early Oligocene where they have been recorded to have all gone extinct as a result of the Grande Coupure faunal turnover event.

The phylogenetic relations of the Xiphodontidae as well as the Anoplotheriidae, Mixtotheriidae and Cainotheriidae have been elusive due to the selenodont morphologies (or having crescent-shaped ridges) of the molars, which were convergent with tylopods or ruminants. Some researchers considered the selenodont families Anoplotheriidae, Xiphodontidae, and Cainotheriidae to be within Tylopoda due to postcranial features that were similar to the tylopods from North America in the Palaeogene. Other researchers consider them more closely related to ruminants than tylopods based on dental morphology. Different phylogenetic analyses have produced different results for the "derived" (or of new evolutionary traits) selenodont Eocene European artiodactyl families, making it uncertain whether they were closer to the Tylopoda or Ruminantia. Possibly, the Xiphodontidae may have arisen from an unknown dichobunoid group, thus making its resemblance to tylopods an instance of convergent evolution.

In an article published in 2019, Romain Weppe et al. conducted a phylogenetic analysis on the Cainotherioidea within the Artiodactyla based on mandibular and dental characteristics, specifically in terms of relationships with artiodactyls of the Palaeogene. The results retrieved that the superfamily was closely related to the Mixtotheriidae and Anoplotheriidae. They determined that the Cainotheriidae, Robiacinidae, Anoplotheriidae, and Mixtotheriidae formed a clade that was the sister group to the Ruminantia while Tylopoda, along with the Amphimerycidae and Xiphodontidae split earlier in the tree (the latter family is represented only by Xiphodon in the cladogram). The phylogenetic tree published in the article and another work about the cainotherioids is outlined below:

- - Eurodexis russelli
  - Dichobune leporina
  - - - Amphimeryx murinus
      - - Xiphodon castrense
        - Tylopoda
          - Paratoceras coatesi
          - Eotylopus reedi
    - - Ruminantia
        - Parvitragulus priscus
        - - Lophiomeryx chalaniati
          - Archaeomeryx optatus
      - - Mixtotheriidae
          Mixtotherium cuspidatum
        - Anoplotheriidae
          - Anoplotherium latipes
          - Dacrytherium ovinum
        - Cainotherioidea
          - Robiacinidae
            - Robiacina lavergnesis
            - - Robiacina minuta
              - Robiacina quercyi
          - Cainotheriidae
            - Palembertina deplasi
            - - Oxacroninae
                - Paroxacron bergeri
                - - Paroxacron valdense
                  - Oxacron courtoisii
              - Cainotheriinae
                - Cainotherium laticurvatum
                - - Caenomeryx
                    - Caenomeryx filholi
                    - Caenomeryx procommunis
                  - Plesiomeryx
                    - Plesiomeryx cadurcensis
                    - Plesiomeryx huerzeleri

In 2022, Weppe created a phylogenetic analysis in his academic thesis regarding Palaeogene artiodactyl lineages, focusing most specifically on the endemic European families. He stated that his phylogeny was the first formal one to propose affinities of the Xiphodontidae and Anoplotheriidae. He found that the Anoplotheriidae, Mixtotheriidae, and Cainotherioidea form a clade based on synapomorphic dental traits (traits thought to have originated from their most recent common ancestor). The result, Weppe mentioned, matches up with previous phylogenetic analyses on the Cainotherioidea with other endemic European Palaeogene artiodactyls that support the families as a clade. As a result, he argued that the proposed superfamily Anoplotherioidea, composing of the Anoplotheriidae and Xiphodontidae as proposed by Alan W. Gentry and Hooker in 1988, is invalid due to the polyphyly of the lineages in the phylogenetic analysis, meaning that the two families were not as closely related as previously thought. However, the Xiphodontidae was still found to compose part of a wider clade with the three other groups. Within the Xiphodontidae, Weppe's phylogeny tree classified Haplomeryx as a sister taxon to the clade consisting of Xiphodon plus Dichodon, making the latter two close relatives.

== Description ==
=== Skull ===
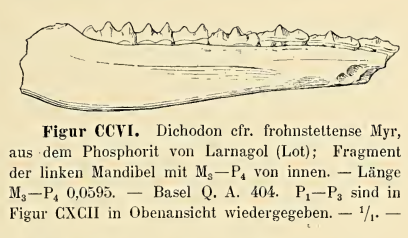
Incomplete hemimandible of D. cf. frohnstettensis, 1910

Compared to Xiphodon, Dichodon has not been as closely discussed by other sources in terms of anatomical features of the skull. Most of what is known about the skull of Dichodon is based on observations written by French palaeontologist Colette Dechaseaux in 1965. Her study and reconstruction of the genus were based on fossils of D. cf. cervinum held by the Natural History Museum of Basel along with a mandible of D. cervinum, previously recorded by the French palaeontologist Charles Depéret in 1917. The skull of Dichodon appears both high and narrow, and the openings of the nasal bones appear reduced. The skull of D. cf. cervinum appears triangular in shape, the back area being particular enlarged and the nasals appearing quadrangular in shape. The external nostrils are widened at their midlength areas, extending from the front area of the premaxilla to the midlength of P^{2}. The alveolar process (or edge with a tooth socket) of the premaxilla is oval-shaped and narrow. While the nasal passages are narrowed, the external nostrils appear more widely open. The nasal bones themselves are narrow plus elongated. The orbit, the eye socket, is positioned frontward.

The maxilla and lacrimal bone are the largest bones present within the side portion of the snout. In its upper half area, the maxilla appears to be strongly hollowed up to the lacrimal bone area. The premaxilla projects forward to the point where the incisors are observable at the skull's sides. The premaxillary-maxillary suture occupies a slight external edge of the nostril. The premaxillary-nasal suture extends forward up to the centre of the second premolar. The maxillary-lacrimal suture appears from the nasal and extends by appearing straight at first then concave. Dichodon has multiple noticeable fossae (hollowings in bones) such as the lacrimal fossa and malar fossa, which are all deep but individualized in form. It is uncertain if the positions of the fossae are due to phylogenetic relations or thinness of the cranial vault and sinuses. The lacrimal fossa on D. cervinum is well-developed and therefore affects the morphologies of the maxilla, nasal bones, and frontal bone. The snout of Dichodon is similar to that of Xiphodon but differs from it by being shorter and narrower. That of Xiphodon in comparison is more rounded and elongated in appearance, the maxillae constituting part of the snout being less extensive in height.

The palatine bones of Dichodon are V-shaped. At both sides of the sagittal axis, the hard palate is almost flat. The incisive foramen is small, extending approximately from the canine to the centre of the first premolar. Between the two incisive foramina of D. cf. cervinum is a rounded ridge that divides into two at the sockets of the third incisors. Both palatine foramen types of Dichodon have similar proportions and positions to the palatine foramen of Xiphodon, but those of Xiphodon are greater in length and have different morphologies to those of Dichodon.

The mandible of Dichodon can resemble that of the anoplotheriid Dacrytherium but differs by the front, or body, portion being rectilinear in shape and the reduction of the convex form within the dental row. Little has been published in regard to the mandible's anatomical traits since Depéret. This is part of the problem behind the relatively incomplete anatomical record of the genus itself, but Dechaseaux determined that the skull of Dichodon would have resembled those of the Palaeogene camelid Poebrotherium and the oromerycid Protylopus.

The known brain endocast (natural brain-shaped cast) of Dichodon is only partial, consisting of a front region with a left olfactory bulb and a back area. The olfactory bulbs are positioned behind the orbit.

=== Dentition ===
Both Xiphodon and Dichodon display complete sets of 3 three incisors, 1 canine, 4 premolars, and 3 molars on each half of the upper and lower jaws, consistent with the primitive placental mammal dental formula of 3.1.4.33.1.4.3 for a total of 44 teeth. As members of the Xiphodontidae, they share both small incisors and the absences of distinct diastemata (gaps between teeth). They are also characterized by indistinct canines in comparison to their other teeth and elongated premolars. Xiphodontids additionally have molariform P^{4} plus P_{4} teeth, upper molars with 4 to 5 crescent-shaped cusps, and selenodont lower molars with 4 ridges, compressed lingual (mouth's inner area) cuspids, and crescent-shaped labial (outward area) cuspids.

The dentition of Dichodon is brachyodont, or high-crowned, in form. Most of its premolars are significantly elongated, but its P^{4} teeth are molarized, or more closely resembling molars, while the P_{4} teeth are three-lobed. The upper molars are tetraselenodont, or four-cusped, and has an overall semi-quadrangular shape; in some species, the molars more compressed at the top sides. The preprotocrista ridges (enamel ridges connecting to the protocone and paracone cusps) of the molars are very short. The four-cusped trait on Dichodon was inherently present in all species including the earliest-appearing D. simplex. The earliest species such as D. simplex and D. ruetimeyeri, however, have upper P^{4} teeth that are instead of triangular shapes with a singular internal tubercle (crown elevation). Later species such as D. subtilis, D. cuspidatum, D. cervinum and D. frohnstettensis have semi-quadrangular P^{4} teeth.

All species of Dichodon are defined by elongated premolars, but the degree of such elongations can define individual species. However, the trends of elongated premolars are unclear in relation to proposed phylogenetic relations. For instance, D. subtilis is specialized compared to most other species in its extreme elongation. According to Sudre, the prominence of elongated premolars of D. vidalenci is similar to that of D. subtilis, but it is uncertain whether this is a case of parallel evolution where two independent lineages acquired the same traits (the validity of D. vidalenci remains questioned). The degree of molarization of the fourth premolars is another trait defining different species and potentially lineages. Sudre suggested that the hypothesized lineage of D. ruetimeyeri - D. cartieri had a greater degree of molarization compared to that of another potential lineage consisting of D. simplex - D. lugdunensis.

=== Postcranial skeleton ===
Little is definitely known about the postcranial anatomy of Dichodon and most other xiphodonts. Only Xiphodon has adequately documented postcranial fossils that are informative about its overall anatomy. Depéret assigned two ankle bones, an astragalus and a calcaneus, to D. cervinum in 1917. The former has a similar appearance to that of Dacrytherium with a narrow and elongated shape plus a wide plus deep tibial groove. The calcaneus assigned to Dichodon is also similar to that of Dacrytherium, as it appears narrower compared to those of both Xiphodon and ruminants. However, the postcranial fossils were later reassigned to Xiphodon while those originally assigned to the latter were reclassified to Dichodon. The astragalus reassigned to Dichodon was described as being narrow plus elongated in form, its tibial groove appearing narrow but deep. The back calcaneal facet, occupying a significant portion of the astragalus' back face, is wide compared to those of Dacrytherium and Leptotheridium.

=== Size ===
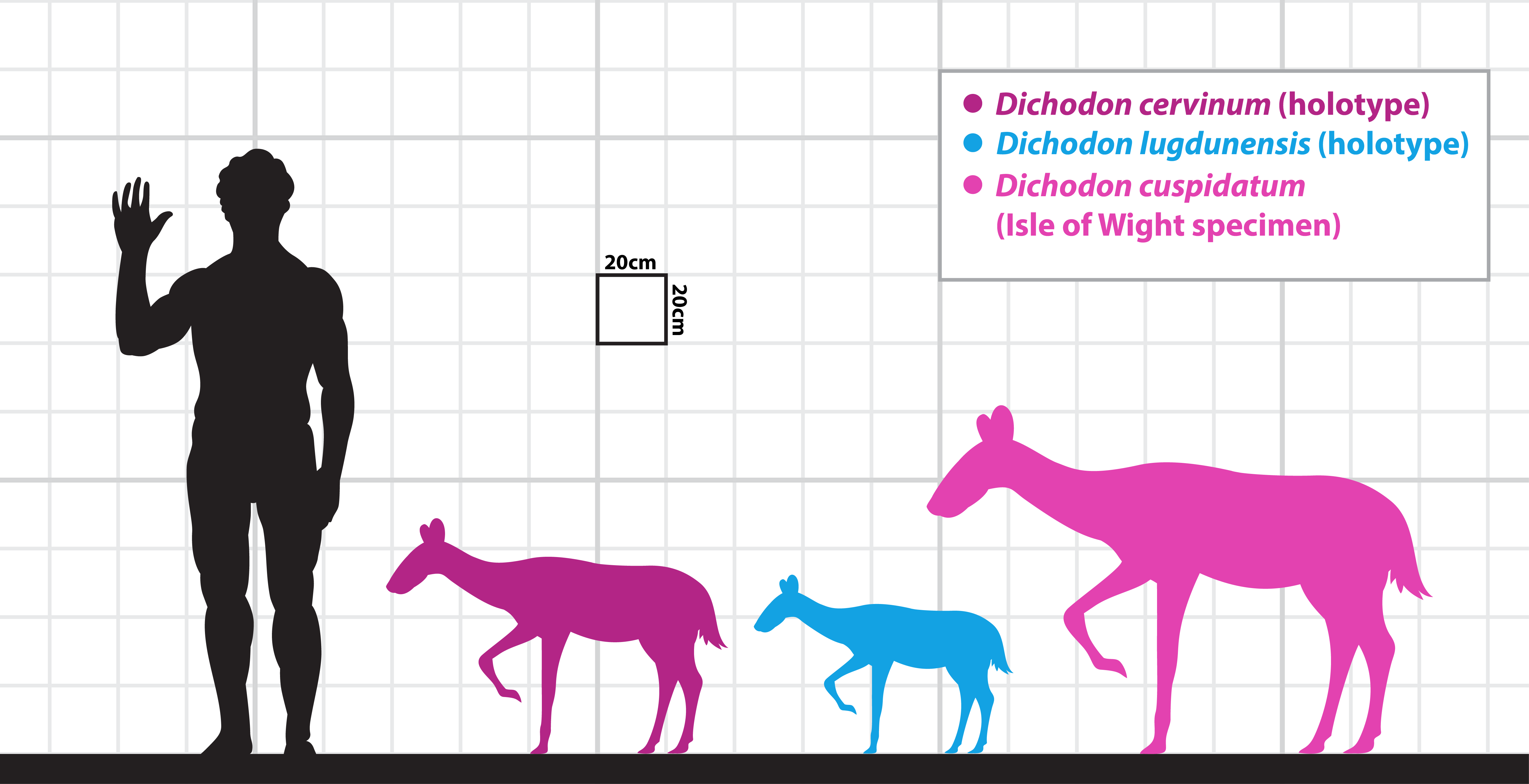
Estimated size comparison of D. cervinum, D. lugdunensis, and D. cuspidatum based on known fossil remains

The Xiphodontidae is characterized by its species being very small to medium in size. Speciose xiphodonts such as Dichodon and Haplomeryx tended to have displayed evolutionary increases in size. Unlike Xiphodon with a consistent medium size range and Haplomeryx with a very small to small size range, Dichodon included small to medium sized species. The larger-sized species compose of D. cervinum, D. cuspidatum, D. stehlini, and D. biroi while the others, namely D. frohnstettensis, D. simplex, D. subtilis, D. cartieri, D. lugdunensis, and D. ruetimeyeri, are smaller-sized. The M^{2} of the smaller-sized D. lugdunensis, for instance, measures 7 mm (0.28 in) long and 7.7 mm (0.30 in) wide. In comparison, the dentition of D. stehlini is very large based on M^{2} measuring 13 mm (0.51 in) long and 14 mm (0.55 in) wide, attesting to the gigantism of it and D. cuspidatum compared to other species. The two very large species were probably offshoots appearing at later points of time that did not last long, as evident by their restricted single localities.

In 2019, Helder Gomes Rodriguez et al. published weight estimates of Palaeogene artiodactyls including Xiphodon, calculated from dental measurements or those of astragali, but not but not the other xiphodont genera Dichodon and Haplomeryx.

== Palaeobiology ==
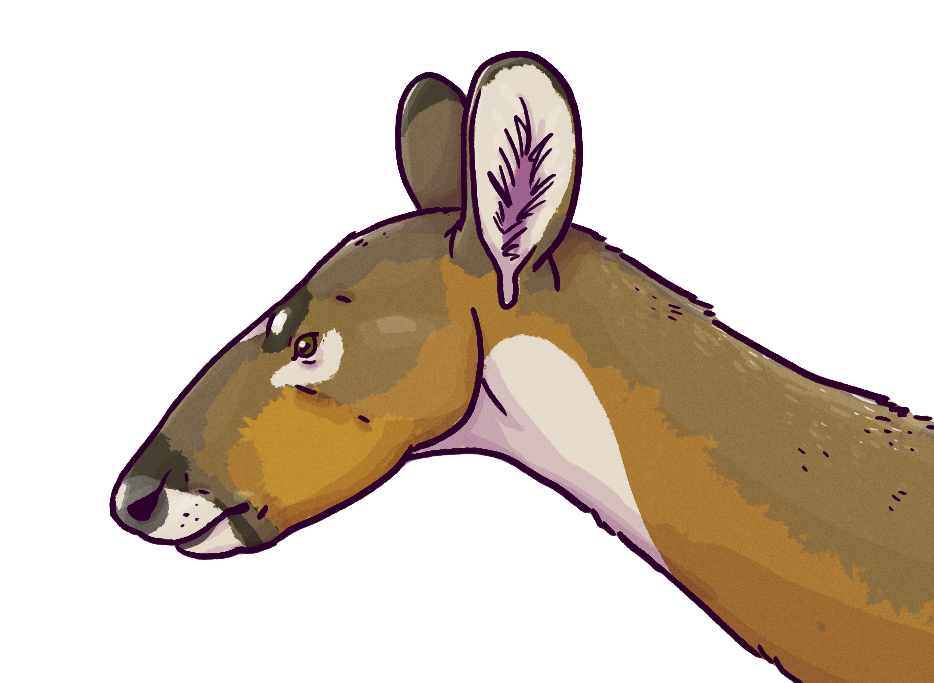
Palaeoart reconstruction of the head of D. cervinum

The Xiphodontidae is a selenodont artiodactyl group in western Europe, meaning that the family was likely adapted for folivorous (leaf-eating) dietary habits. Dechaseaux considered that the two xiphodontids, Xiphodon and Dichodon, may have been more evolutionarily derived compared to North American Palaeogene tylopods. The latter genus had higher-crowned (brachyodont) selenodont dentition compared to the anoplotheriid Dacrytherium. Dichodon has no modern analogues in dentition with respect to extant artiodactyls like ruminants and was likely greatly adapted for folivory. Dichodon and Xiphodon display different morphologies in dentition, implying different ecological specializations. Dichodon had progressively molarized premolars for the function of grinding food while Xiphodon retained the primitive trait of having molars with five cusps and shifted towards specialized bladelike dentition.

Due to the lack of postcranial evidence of other xiphodonts other than Xiphodon, thought to have been adapted towards cursoriality based on similar forelimb morphologies to those of the Palaeogene camelids, it is not possible to prove that the postcranial morphologies of Dichodon and Haplomeryx were similar to those of Xiphodon. Because of the dental and postcranial similarities, Xiphodon and Dichodon could have been European ecological counterparts to camelids.

== Palaeoecology ==
=== Middle Eocene ===
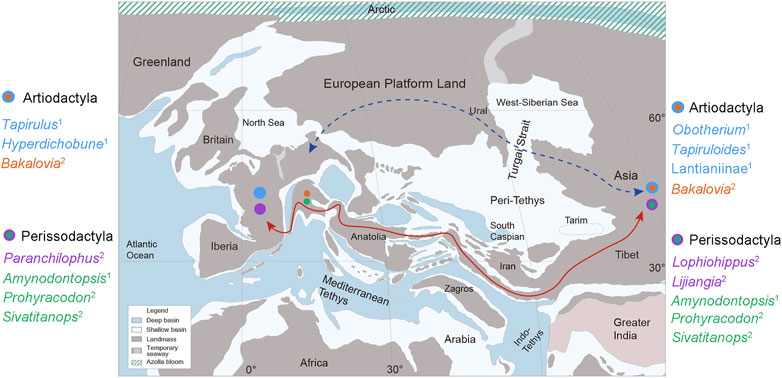
Palaeogeography of Europe and Asia during the middle Eocene with possible artiodactyl and perissodactyl dispersal routes.

For much of the Eocene, a hothouse climate with humid, tropical environments with consistently high precipitations prevailed. Modern mammalian orders including the Perissodactyla, Artiodactyla, and Primates (or the suborder Euprimates) appeared already by the early Eocene, diversifying rapidly and developing dentitions specialized for folivory. The omnivorous forms mostly either switched to folivorous diets or went extinct by the middle Eocene (47–37 million years ago) along with the archaic "condylarths". By the late Eocene (approx. 37–33 mya), most of the ungulate form dentitions shifted from bunodont (or rounded) cusps to cutting ridges (i.e. lophs) for folivorous diets.

Land connections between western Europe and North America were interrupted around 53 Ma. From the early Eocene up until the Grande Coupure extinction event (56–33.9 mya), western Eurasia was separated into three landmasses: western Europe (an archipelago), Balkanatolia (in-between the Paratethys Sea of the north and the Neotethys Ocean of the south), and eastern Eurasia. The Holarctic mammalian faunas of western Europe were therefore mostly isolated from other landmasses including Greenland, Africa, and eastern Eurasia, allowing for endemism to develop. Therefore, the European mammals of the late Eocene (MP17–MP20 of the Mammal Palaeogene zones) were mostly descendants of endemic middle Eocene groups.

Some of the first undisputed xiphodont species to appear in the fossil record are D. ruetimeyeri of the Egerkingen-Huppersand locality of Switzerland (MP13? or MP14?) and D. cartieri of the Egerkingen α + β locality (MP14). By then, they would have coexisted with perissodactyls (Palaeotheriidae, Lophiodontidae, and Hyrachyidae), non-endemic artiodactyls (Dichobunidae and Tapirulidae), endemic European artiodactyls (Choeropotamidae, Cebochoeridae, and Anoplotheriidae), and primates (Adapidae). The Amphimerycidae made its first appearance by the level MP14. The stratigraphic ranges of the early species of Dichodon also overlapped with metatherians (Herpetotheriidae), cimolestans (Pantolestidae, Paroxyclaenidae), rodents (Ischyromyidae, Theridomyoidea, Gliridae), eulipotyphlans, bats, apatotherians, carnivoraformes (Miacidae), and hyaenodonts (Hyainailourinae, Proviverrinae). Other MP13-MP14 sites have also yielded fossils of turtles and crocodylomorphs, and MP13 sites are stratigraphically the latest to have yielded remains of the bird clades Gastornithidae and Palaeognathae.

In the Egerkingen α + β locality, D. cartieri fossils occur with those of the herpetotheriid Amphiperatherium, ischyromyids Ailuravus and Plesiarctomys, pseudosciurid Treposciurus, omomyid Necrolemur, adapid Leptadapis, proviverrine Proviverra, palaeotheres (Propalaeotherium, Anchilophus, Lophiotherium, Plagiolophus, Palaeotherium), hyrachyid Chasmotherium, lophiodont Lophiodon, dichobunids Hyperdichobune and Mouillacitherium, choeropotamid Rhagatherium, anoplotheriid Catodontherium, amphimerycid Pseudamphimeryx, cebochoerid Cebochoerus, tapirulid Tapirulus, mixtotheriid Mixtotherium, and the xiphodont Haplomeryx. Both D. ruetimeyeri and D. cartieri are known only from their type localities, meaning that they have restricted stratigraphic ranges.

MP16, as evident by the locality of Le Bretou in France, marks the first appearances of D. cervinum and D. frohnstettensis according to recent sources (the latter of which is also recorded at another MP16 locality Lavergne), along with D. vidalenci. Dichodon is recorded in Le Bretou along with the herpetotheriids Amphiperatherium and Peratherium, pseudorhyncocyonid Leptictidium, nyctitheriids Cryptotopos and Saturninia, notharctid Anchomomys, omomyid Necrolemur, rodents (Elfomys, Glamys, Paradelomys, Remys, Sciuroides), bats (Carcinipteryx, Hipposideros, Palaeophyllophora, Vaylatsia), proviverrine Allopterodon, carnivoraformes Quercygale and Paramiacis, palaeotheres (Anchilophus, Plagiolophus, Palaeotherium), lophiodont Lophiodon, cebochoerids Acotherulum and Cebochoerus, anoplotheriids (Catodontherium, Dacrytherium, Robiatherium), dichobunids Dichobune and Mouillacitherium, amphimerycid Pseudamphimeryx, robiacinid Robiacina, tapirulid Tapirulus, and the other xiphodonts Xiphodon and Haplomeryx.

After MP16, faunal turnover occurred, marking the disappearances of the lophiodonts and European hyrachyids as well as the extinctions of all European crocodylomorphs except for the alligatoroid Diplocynodon. The causes of the faunal turnover have been attributed to a shift from humid and highly tropical environments to drier and more temperate forests with open areas and more abrasive vegetation. The surviving herbivorous faunas shifted their dentitions and dietary strategies accordingly to adapt to abrasive and seasonal vegetation. The environments were still subhumid and full of subtropical evergreen forests, however. The Palaeotheriidae was the sole remaining European perissodactyl group, and frugivorous-folivorous or purely folivorous artiodactyls became the dominant group in western Europe.

=== Late Eocene ===
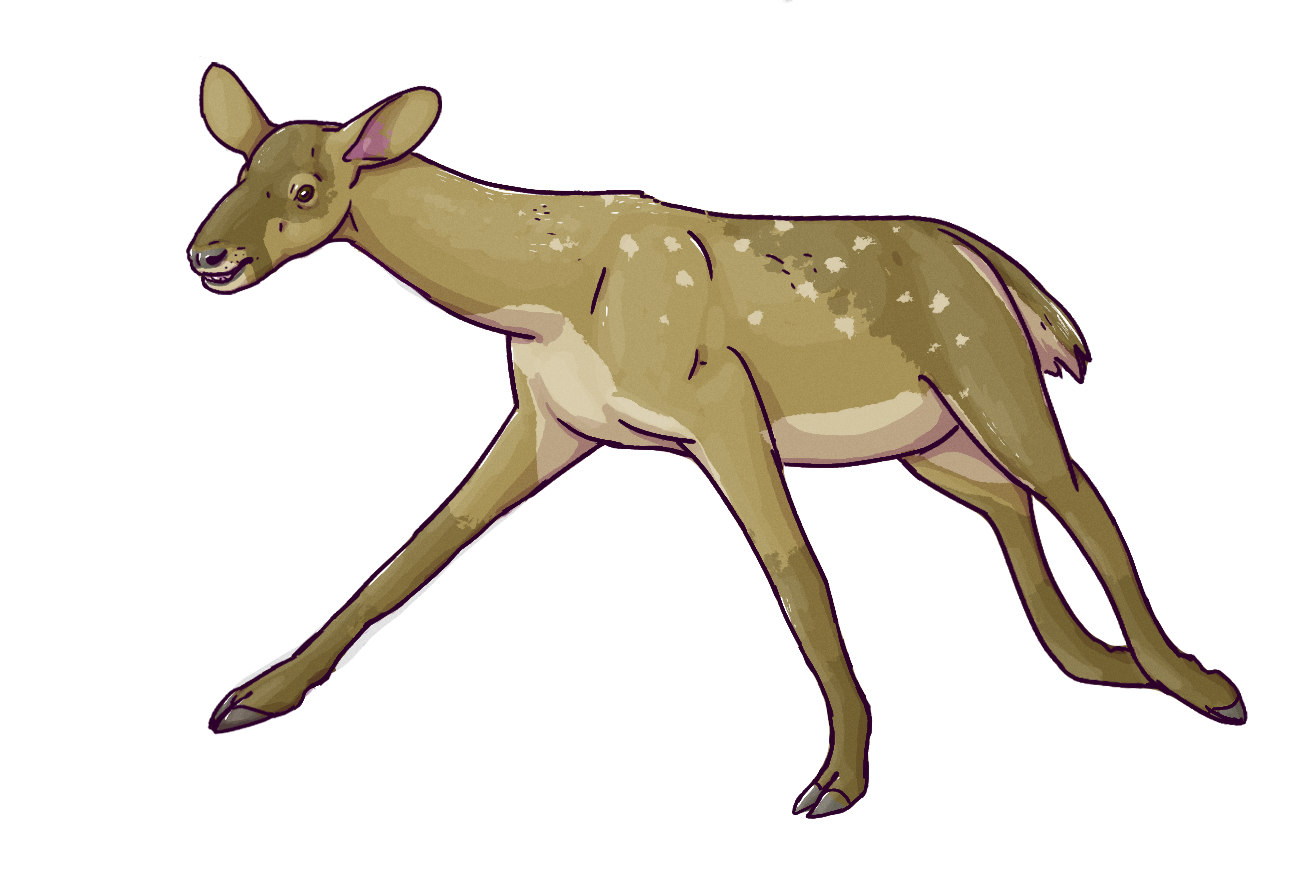
Reconstruction of Xiphodon, which the other xiphodonts Dichodon and Haplomeryx both frequently cooccurred with

The late Eocene records two species of Dichodon that are exclusive to single localities, namely D. cuspidatum at the Hordle Cliff (MP17) and D. stehlini from La Débruge (MP18). On the other hand, D. cervinum and D. frohnstettensis are recorded in multiple British, French, and Swiss localities dating from MP17a to MP20. By that time, the Cainotheriidae and the derived anoplotheriids Anoplotherium and Diplobune both made their first fossil record appearances by MP18. In addition, several migrant mammal groups had reached western Europe by MP17a-MP18, namely the Anthracotheriidae, Hyaenodontinae, and Amphicyonidae. In addition to snakes, frogs, and salamandrids, rich assemblage of lizards are known in western Europe as well from MP16-MP20, representing the Iguanidae, Lacertidae, Gekkonidae, Agamidae, Scincidae, Helodermatidae, and Varanoidea, most of which were able to thrive in the warm temperatures of western Europe.

In the MP19 locality of Escamps, D. frohnstettensis is recorded to have cooccurred with the likes of the herpetotheriids Amphiperatherium and Peratherium, pseudorhyncocyonid Pseudorhyncocyon, nyctitheres Saturninia and Amphidozotherium, bats (Hipposideros, Vaylatsia, Stehlinia), theridomyids (Paradelomys, Elfomys, Blainvillimys, Theridomys), adapid Palaeolemur, hyainailourine Pterodon, amphicyonid Cynodictis, palaeotheres Palaeotherium and Plagiolophus, dichobunid Dichobune, choeropotamid Choeropotamus, anoplotheriids Anoplotherium and Diplobune, cainotheres Oxacron and Paroxacron, amphimerycid Amphimeryx, and the other xiphodonts Xiphodon and Haplomeryx.

== Extinction ==
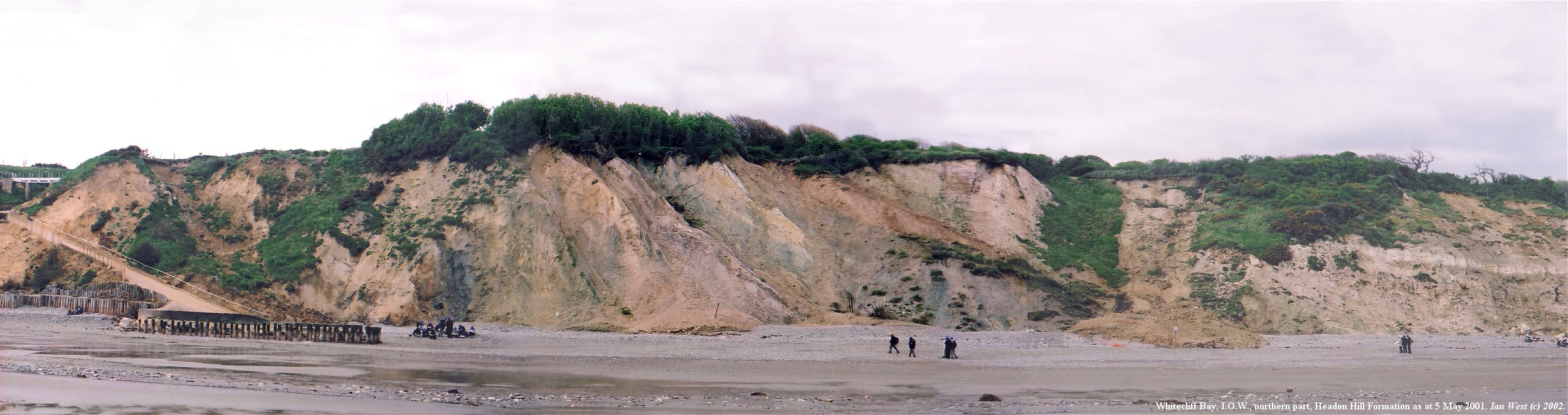
A panorama of the Headon Hill Formation in the Isle of Wight. The stratigraphy of it and the Bouldnor Formation led to better understandings of faunal chronologies from the Late Eocene up to the Grande Coupure.

The Grande Coupure event during the latest Eocene to earliest Oligocene (MP20-MP21) is one of the largest and most abrupt faunal turnovers in the Cenozoic of Western Europe and coincident with climate forcing events of cooler and more seasonal climates. The event led to the extinction of 60% of western European mammalian lineages, which were subsequently replaced by Asian immigrants. The Grande Coupure is often dated directly to the Eocene-Oligocene boundary at 33.9 Ma, although some estimate that the event began slightly later, at 33.6–33.4 mya. The event occurred during or after the Eocene-Oligocene transition, an abrupt shift from a hot greenhouse world that characterised much of the Palaeogene to a coolhouse/icehouse world from the early Oligocene onwards. The massive drop in temperatures results from the first major expansion of the Antarctic ice sheets that caused drastic pCO_{2} decreases and an estimated drop of ~70 m (230 ft) in sea level.

Many palaeontologists agree that glaciation and the resulting drops in sea level allowed for increased migrations between Balkanatolia and western Europe. The Turgai Strait, which once separated much of Europe from Asia, is often proposed as the main European seaway barrier prior to the Grande Coupure, but some researchers challenged this perception recently, arguing that it completely receded already 37 Ma, long before the Eocene-Oligocene transition. In 2022, Alexis Licht et al. suggested that the Grande Coupure could have possibly been synchronous with the Oi-1 glaciation (33.5 Ma), which records a decline in atmospheric CO_{2}, boosting the Antarctic glaciation that already started by the Eocene-Oligocene transition.

The Grande Coupure event also marked a large faunal turnover marking the arrivals of later anthracotheres, entelodonts, ruminants (Gelocidae, Lophiomerycidae), rhinocerotoids (Rhinocerotidae, Amynodontidae, Eggysodontidae), carnivorans (later Amphicyonidae, Amphicynodontidae, Nimravidae, and Ursidae), eastern Eurasian rodents (Eomyidae, Cricetidae, and Castoridae), and eulipotyphlans (Erinaceidae).

All three xiphodont genera are last recorded in MP20 localities. The disappearances of the three genera meant the complete extinction of the Xiphodontidae. Many other artiodactyl genera from western Europe disappeared also as a result of the Grande Coupure extinction event. The extinctions of Dichodon and many other mammals have been attributed to negative interactions with immigrant faunas (competition, predations), environmental changes from cooling climates, or some combination of the two.
