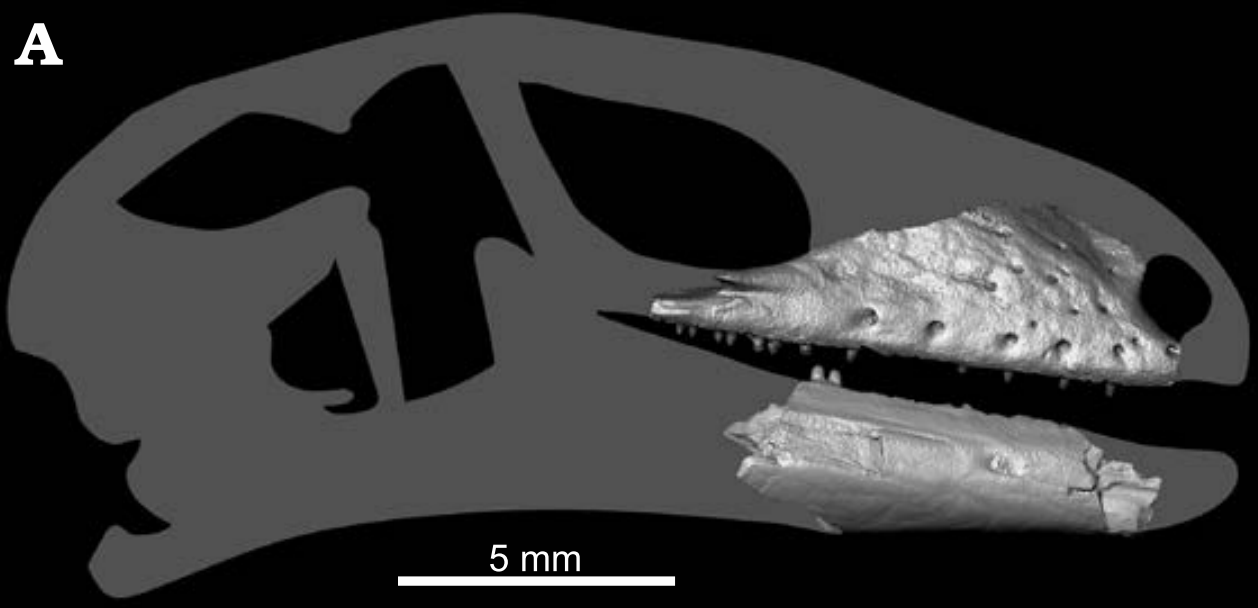

Scientific classification
- Kingdom: Animalia
- Phylum: Chordata
- Class: Reptilia
- Order: Squamata
- Clade: Gekkonomorpha
- Genus: †Bauersaurus; Čerňanský, Daza, Tabuce, Saxton & Vidalenc, 2023
- Species: †B. cosensis

Binomial name
- †Bauersaurus cosensis Čerňanský, Daza, Tabuce, Saxton & Vidalenc, 2023

= Bauersaurus =

Bauersaurus Temporal range: Eocene Ypresian–Lutetian

Extinct genus of lizards

Bauersaurus is an extinct genus of pan-gekkotan lizard from the late Ypresian or early Lutetian of France. It is known from a single species, Bauersaurus cosensis. It is only known from fragments of the upper (maxilla) and lower jaw).

== Discovery ==
Remains of the species were collected from the Quercy Phosphorites, fissure filling deposits found in the Quercy region of France.

== Taxonomy ==
Based on the similarity of its maxillary morphology to Eichstaettisaurus, the authors of the describing paper propoesed that B. cosensis likely represents a ghost lineage of Pan-Gekkota that survived the Cretaceous-Palaeogene extinction event and persisted into the Eocene in Europe, either like Eichstaettisaurus outside crown Gekkota or within the Gekkota crown group.
