= Asiapator =

Asiapator Temporal range: Middle Eocene

Scientific classification
- Kingdom: Animalia
- Phylum: Chordata
- Class: Mammalia
- Order: †Apatotheria
- Family: †Apatemyidae
- Genus: †Asiapator; Lopatin and Averianov, 2021

Type species
- Asiapator onchin

Extinct genus of mammals

Asiapator is an extinct genus of apatemyid mammal that lived in Mongolia during the Eocene epoch. It is known from a single species, A. onchin.
