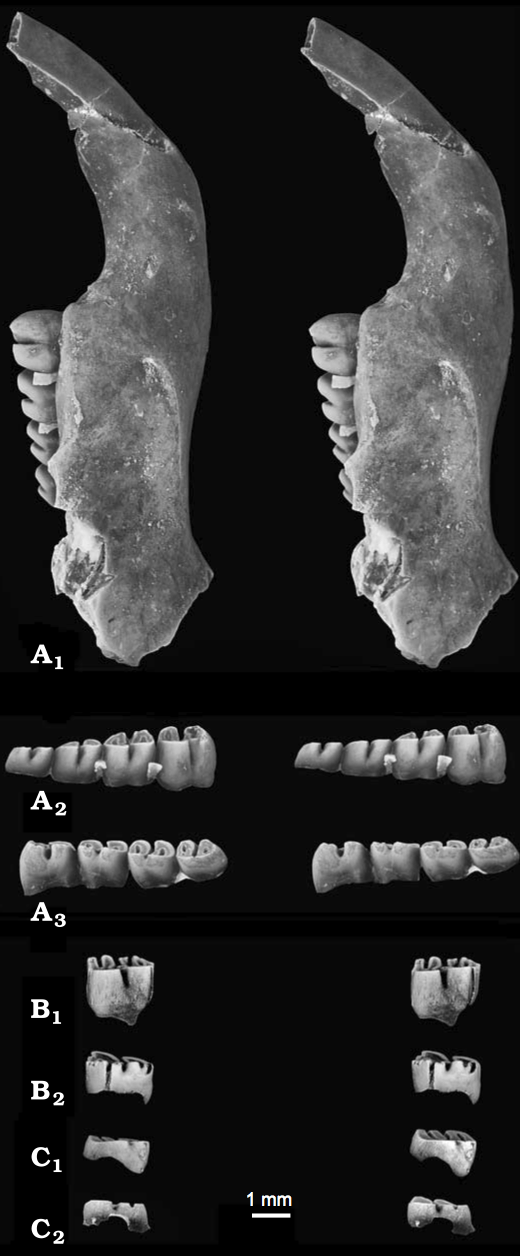
- Jaw and teeth of Apeomyoides savagei, in stereopairs. A, holotype lower jaw (A1: labial view of jaw, A2: labial view of cheekteeth, A3: lingual view of cheekteeth). B, left first or second upper molar (B1: labial view, B2: lingual view). C, left deciduous fourth upper premolar (C1: labial view, C2: lingual view).

Scientific classification
- Kingdom: Animalia
- Phylum: Chordata
- Class: Mammalia
- Order: Rodentia
- Family: †Eomyidae
- Subfamily: †Apeomyinae
- Genus: †Apeomyoides; Smith, Cifelli & Czaplewski, 2006
- Species: †A. savagei

Binomial name
- †Apeomyoides savagei Smith, Cifelli & Czaplewski, 2006

= Apeomyoides =

Extinct genus of rodents

Apeomyoides savagei is a fossil rodent from the Miocene of the United States, the only species in the genus Apeomyoides. It is known from fragmentary jaws and isolated teeth from a site in the early Barstovian, around 15–16 million years ago, of Nevada. Together with other species from scattered localities in the United States, Japan, and Europe, Apeomyoides is classified in the subfamily Apeomyinae of the extinct rodent family Eomyidae. Apeomyines are a rare but widespread group that may have been adapted to a relatively dry habitat.

As is characteristic of apeomyines, Apeomyoides was a large eomyid with high-crowned cheekteeth and a large gap between the incisors and cheekteeth. Furthermore, the cheekteeth—premolars and molars—approach a bilophodont pattern, with two distinct lobes. Other features distinguish Apeomyoides from other apeomyines, including the rectangular shape of the cheekteeth. The fourth lower premolar (p4) is larger than the molars behind it and has two roots, while the lower molars have three.

== Taxonomy ==
Apeomyoides is a member of the Eomyidae, a diverse rodent family that is now extinct. Eomyids first appeared in the Middle Eocene (~47 million years ago, mya) in North America, where they existed until the end of the Miocene (~5 mya). In Europe, they survived a little longer, until the end of the Pliocene (~2–3 mya). Apeomyoides is further part of a distinctive subgroup of eomyids known as the Apeomyinae. The first apeomyine to be discovered was Apeomys tuerkheimae, named in 1968 based on fossils from the Early Miocene of Germany, and later discoveries have expanded the range of Apeomys and similar taxa. In 1998, Oldřich Fejfar and colleagues reviewed Apeomys and identified a second, related genus Megapeomys, from the Early Miocene of the Czech Republic and Japan. These scientists also named a new eomyid subfamily, Apeomyinae, to house Apeomys and Megapeomys. The Japanese Megapeomys was named as a separate species, Megapeomys repenningi, in 2011. Further apeomyines have been identified in North America: Megapeomys bobwilsoni from the Hemingfordian of Nevada, Apeomyoides savagei from the Barstovian of Nevada, Zophoapeomys indicum from the Late Oligocene of South Dakota, and a possible second species of Zophoapeomys from the Late Oligocene of Nebraska. Another North American eomyid, Arikareeomys skinneri, from the Arikareean of Nebraska, has also been reidentified as an apeomyine.

In general, apeomyines are a widespread but generally rare group of dentally distinctive eomyids with a tendency towards large size. Fejfar and colleagues suggested that apeomyines were ecologically distinct from other eomyids and probably preferred a drier habitat. Although other scientists recognized Apeomyinae as a subfamily, in a 2008 summary of North American eomyids, Lawrence Flynn placed the group as a tribe, Apeomyini, within the subfamily Eomyinae. Flynn described Apeomyoides as the most derived apeomyine.

Apeomyoides savagei was described as a new genus and species by Kent Smith, Richard Cifelli, and Nicholas Czaplewski in 2006. The generic name, Apeomyoides, adds the Greek suffix -ides, indicating similarity, to the name of the related genus Apeomys, while the specific name, savagei, honors Donald E. Savage for his work on fossil mammals and for assistance to Smith. In the same paper, these scientists argued in favor of apeomyine affinities for Arikareeomys.

== Description ==
Apeomyoides savagei is a large eomyid, though not as large as Megapeomys lindsayi and M. bobwilsoni. Megapeomys repenningi from Japan is similar in size, but its cheekteeth are not as high-crowned. A. savagei shows a series of traits that are characteristic for the apeomyines: high-crowned cheekteeth with thick enamel that are bilophodont (divided into two lobes) in form and a very long diastema (gap) between the lower incisor and cheekteeth. However, the cheekteeth are higher-crowned than those of other apeomyines, including Apeomys, Megapeomys, and Arikareeomys, and they are rectangular in shape, while other apeomyines have barrel-shaped teeth. Similarly, the oldest apeomyine, Zophoapeomys, is smaller and has lower-crowned cheekteeth. The known material of Apeomyoides consists of a number of fragmentary mandibles (lower jaws) and isolated cheekteeth. The length of the first and second lower molars (m1 and m2) ranges from 1.74 to 2.58 mm, the width from 2.08 to 2.33 mm.

The fourth upper premolar (P4) has not been recorded, but there is a specimen of its deciduous precursor (DP4). This tooth is characterized by four major cusps (protocone, paracone, hypocone, and metacone) and lophs or crests (protoloph, mesoloph, metaloph, and posteroloph), separated by synclines or valleys. The first and second upper molar (M1 and M2) are almost square and similar in size to the DP4. An additional loph on M1 and M2, the entoloph, is incomplete in Apeomyoides, but more prominent in both Megapeomys bobwilsoni and Arikareeomys.

The four lower cheekteeth—the fourth lower premolar (p4) and first through third lower molars (m1–m3)—are high-crowned teeth. Like the upper teeth, they bear four cusps (metaconid, protoconid, entoconid, and hypoconid), four lophs (metalophid, mesolophid, hypolophid, and posterolophid) and three valleys. Each of the lower cheekteeth lacks an additional loph, the ectolophid, which is present in Arikareeomys. The p4 is larger than any of the molars and longer than it is wide. Among the molars, m1 and m2 do not differ appreciably from each other and are a little wider than they are long, while m3 is a little smaller and its back side is more rounded and narrower. Syncline IV, which is located at the back of the tooth, between the hypolophid and posterolophid, is closed at the margins; this valley is open in Megapeomys bobwilsoni. Syncline IV also opens into the centrally located syncline III; this opening is absent in Arikareeomys. There are two roots under p4 and three under each of the molars, fewer than in Megapeomys bobwilsoni, which shows three under p4 and four under the molars.

On the mandible, the diastema is very large and the incisor is procumbent (projecting forward), which distinguishes Apeomyoides from most eomyids apart from Megapeomys. There is a masseteric scar (associated with the jaw muscles) that ends below the front of m1. In Apeomys and Megapeomys this scar reaches forward to below the front root of p4. The mental foramen, an opening in the jawbone, is very small and opens in the diastema, in front of p4, near the ventral shelf of the scar; in Apeomys and Megapeomys it is located near the dorsal shelf. Further foramina are present on the lingual (inner) surface of the bone, below the cheekteeth.

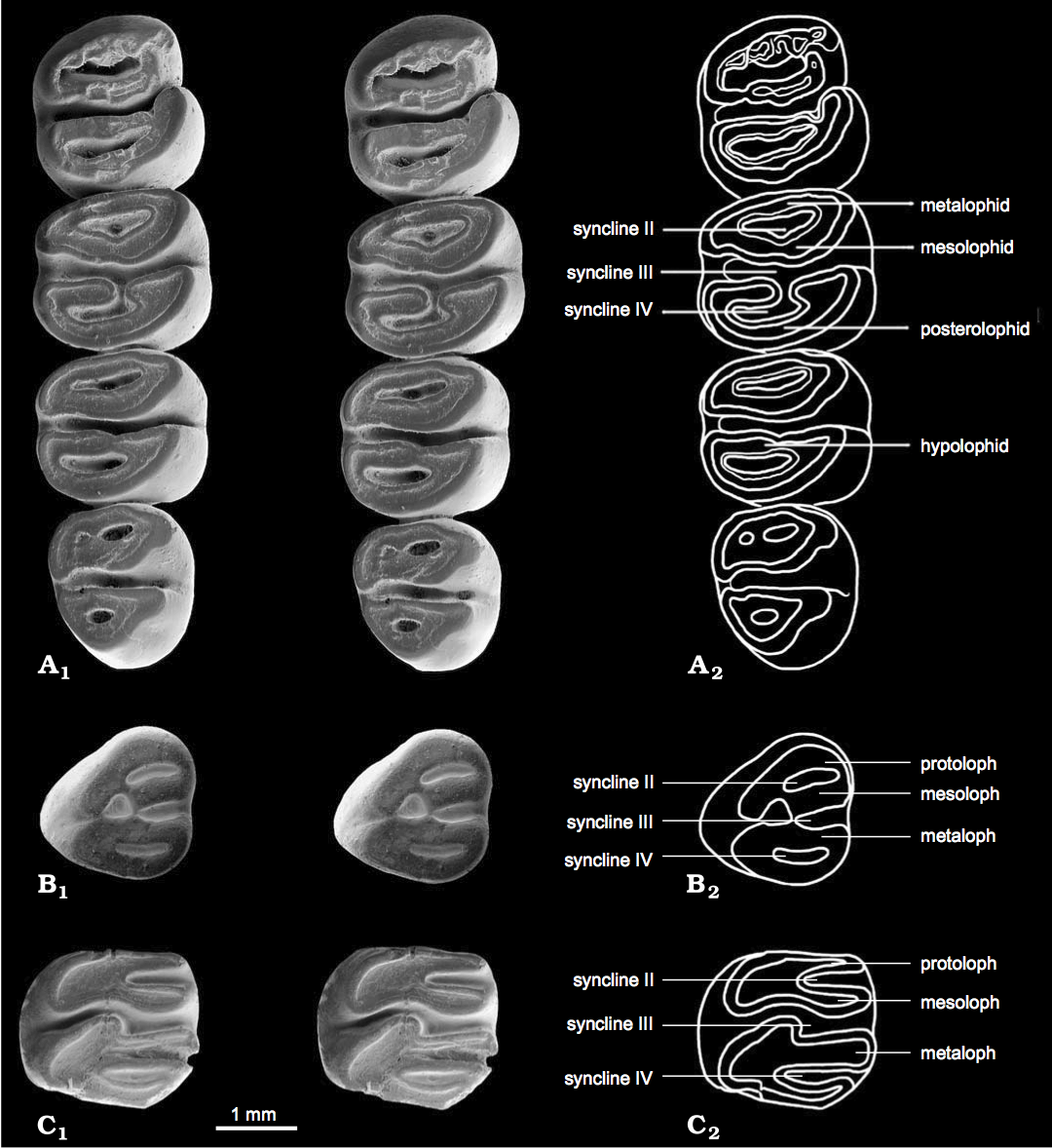
Cheekteeth of Apeomyoides savagei seen in occlusal view (looking at the chewing surface), with electron micrographs in stereopairs and explanatory drawings. A, right p4 through m3 of the holotype. B, left DP4. C, left M1 or M2.

== Distribution and ecology ==
Apeomyoides savagei is from the Eastgate local fauna in the Monarch Mill Formation of Churchill County, Nevada. This fauna dates to the early Barstovian land mammal age, around 15–16 mya. This makes Apeomyoides the youngest known apeomyine, and its occurrence helps close a gap in the known geographic range of North American apeomyines between Megapeomys bobwilsoni elsewhere in Nevada and Arikareeomys in Nebraska. Other eomyids found at Eastgate include species of Leptodontomys and Pseudotheridomys.
