= Ventivorus =

Ventivorus Temporal range: Eocene

Scientific classification
- Kingdom: Animalia
- Phylum: Chordata
- Class: Aves
- Clade: Strisores
- Order: Caprimulgiformes
- Family: Caprimulgidae
- Genus: †Ventivorus; Mourer-Chauviré, 1988
- Species: †V. ragei

Binomial name
- †Ventivorus ragei Mourer-Chauviré, 1988

Extinct monotypic genus of birds

Ventivorus is an extinct genus of nightjar represented by fossils found in the Le Bretou fossil site in Quercy. The genus is only known from a single species, Ventivorus ragei.
