= Ameripodius =

Ameripodius Temporal range: Late Oligocene-Early Miocene

Scientific classification
- Kingdom: Animalia
- Phylum: Chordata
- Class: Aves
- Family: †Quercymegapodiidae
- Genus: †Ameripodius; Alvarenga, 1995

Type species
- Ameripodius silvasantosi Alvarenga, 1995

Species
- Ameripodius silvasantosi Ameripodius alexis

Extinct genus of bird

Ameripodius is an extinct genus of quercymegapodiid that lived during the Oligocene and Miocene epochs.

== Distribution ==
Ameripodius silvasantosi fossils are known from the Late Oligocene Tremembé Formation of Brazil. Ameripodius alexis is known from Early Miocene deposits in France.
