= Quercymegapodius =

Quercymegapodius Temporal range: Palaeogene

Scientific classification
- Domain: Eukaryota
- Kingdom: Animalia
- Phylum: Chordata
- Class: Aves
- Family: †Quercymegapodiidae
- Genus: †Quercymegapodius; Mourer-Chauviré, 1992

Type species
- Quercymegapodius brodkorpi

Species
- Quercymegapodius brodkorpi Quercymegapodius depereti

Extinct genus of quercymegapodiid bird

Quercymegapodius is an extinct genus of quercymegapodiid bird that lived during the Eocene epoch.

== Distribution ==
Quercymegapodius brodkorpi is known from fossilised remains found in the Quercy Phosphorites Formation of France. Quercymegapodius depereti is also known from this formation.
