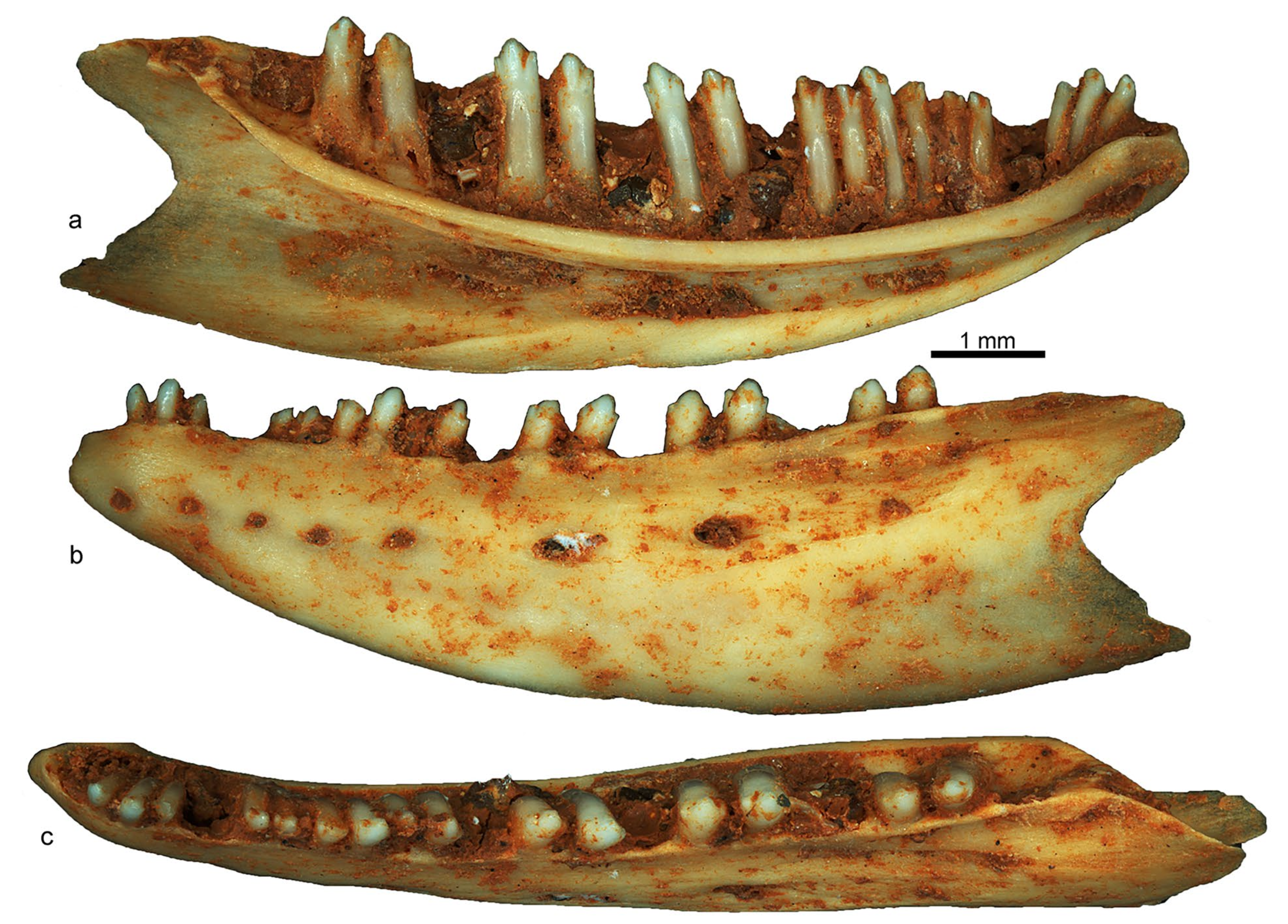
- The holotype of Phosphoriguana, shown from multiple views

Scientific classification
- Kingdom: Animalia
- Phylum: Chordata
- Class: Reptilia
- Order: Squamata
- Suborder: Iguania
- Infraorder: Pleurodonta (?)
- Genus: †Phosphoriguana; Lemierre & Ceorgialis, 2025

Type species
- † Phosphoriguana peritechne Lemierre & Ceorgialis, 2025

= Phosphoriguana =

Phosphoriguana Temporal range: Late Eocene

Extinct genus of iguanian

Phosphoriguana is an extinct genus of iguanian. The type and only species is P. peritechne. The genus name is a reference to the Quercy Phosphorites and the extant genus Iguana; the species epithet is the Ancient Greek word "peritechne", which means "elaborate", in reference to the complex shape of the animal's teeth.

The holotype of Phosphoriguana is a single partial lower jaw, given the specimen number UM-BFI 3057. Despite being relatively incomplete, it is identifiable as an iguanian and can be distinguished from its close relatives by several features of the jaw and teeth. Its exact affinities within Iguania are uncertain. In their description of the fossil, Lemierre and Ceorgialis tentatively refer it to the clade Pleurodonta based on the presence of a single synapomorphy—the anteromedial process of the coronoid beneath the tooth row.

The only fossils of Phosphoriguana were discovered in the Quercy Phosphorites Formation in southern France. It was discovered at a locality called La Bouffie near the village of Vaylats. This stratum dates to the Late Eocene epoch.
