= Japaneomys =

Japaneomys Temporal range: Early Miocene

Scientific classification
- Kingdom: Animalia
- Phylum: Chordata
- Class: Mammalia
- Order: Rodentia
- Family: †Eomyidae
- Genus: †Japaneomys; Kimura et al., 2019
- Species: †J. yasunoi

Binomial name
- †Japaneomys yasunoi Kimura et al., 2019

Genus of mammals (fossil)

Japaneomys is an extinct genus of rodent that inhabited Japan during the Miocene epoch. It contains a single species, J. yasunoi.
