= Issiodoromys =

Issiodoromys Temporal range: Early Oligocene–Late Oligocene

Scientific classification
- Kingdom: Animalia
- Phylum: Chordata
- Class: Mammalia
- Order: Rodentia
- Family: †Theridomyidae
- Genus: †Issiodoromys; Bravard, 1852

Species
- Issiodoromys balmensis Mayo, 1987; Issiodoromys limognensis Schmidt-Kittler and Vianey-Liaud, 1987; Issiodoromys medius Vianey-Liaud, 1976; Issiodoromys minor Filhol, 1876; Issiodoromys pauffiensis Vianey-Liaud, 1976

Extinct genus of theridomyid rodent

Issiodoromys is an extinct genus of theridomyid rodent that lived in Europe during the Rupelian and Chattian stages of the Oligocene epoch.

== Distribution ==
Issiodoromys minor is known from France, Switzerland, and Spain. Issiodoromys medius is known only from France and Switzerland. Issiodoromys limognensis is known only from France and Spain. Issiodoromys balmensis is known only from Switzerland. Issiodoromys pauffiensis is known only from France.

== Palaeobiology ==
Based on its low mandibular condyle, the flatness of its molar occlusal surface, and the posterior orientation of the pterygoid and masseter, Issiodoromys likely exhibited a chewing pattern that was slightly oblique to propalinal.
