= Itardiornis =

Itardiornis Temporal range: Late Eocene-Early Oligocene

Scientific classification
- Domain: Eukaryota
- Kingdom: Animalia
- Phylum: Chordata
- Class: Aves
- Order: Gruiformes
- Family: †Messelornithidae
- Genus: †Itardiornis; Mourer-Chauviré, 1995
- Species: †I. hessae

Binomial name
- †Itardiornis hessae Mourer-Chauviré, 1995

Extinct genus of birds

Itardiornis is an extinct genus of the family Messelornithidae from late Eocene and early Oligocene. Only one species is described, Itardiornis hessae, from Quercy fissure fillings.
