= Peignictis =

Peignictis Temporal range: Early Oligocene

Scientific classification
- Kingdom: Animalia
- Phylum: Chordata
- Class: Mammalia
- Infraclass: Placentalia
- Order: Carnivora
- Genus: †Peignictis
- Species: †P. pseudamphictis

Binomial name
- †Peignictis pseudamphictis De Bonis et al., 2019

Extinct genus of mammals

Peignictis is an extinct genus of carnivoran that lived in France during the Palaeogene period. It contains the species P. pseudamphictis.
