= Megalotriton =

Megalotriton Temporal range: Priabonian, 37.2–33.9 Ma

Scientific classification
- Domain: Eukaryota
- Kingdom: Animalia
- Phylum: Chordata
- Class: Amphibia
- Order: Urodela
- Family: Salamandridae
- Genus: †Megalotriton; Zittel, 1890

Type species
- †M. filholi Zittel, 1890

Extinct genus of amphibians

Megalotriton is an extinct genus of prehistoric salamanders which lived in Europe during the Late Eocene.

== See also ==
- List of prehistoric amphibians
