= Quercymegapodiidae =

Quercymegapodiidae Temporal range: Late Eocene – Early Miocene

Scientific classification
- Domain: Eukaryota
- Kingdom: Animalia
- Phylum: Chordata
- Class: Aves
- Clade: Pangalliformes
- Family: †Quercymegapodiidae; Mourer-Chauviré, 1992

Genera
- †Taubacrex; †Ameripodius; †Quercymegapodius

Extinct family of birds

Quercymegapodiidae is an extinct group of stem Galliformes birds with fossils found in France and Brazil.
