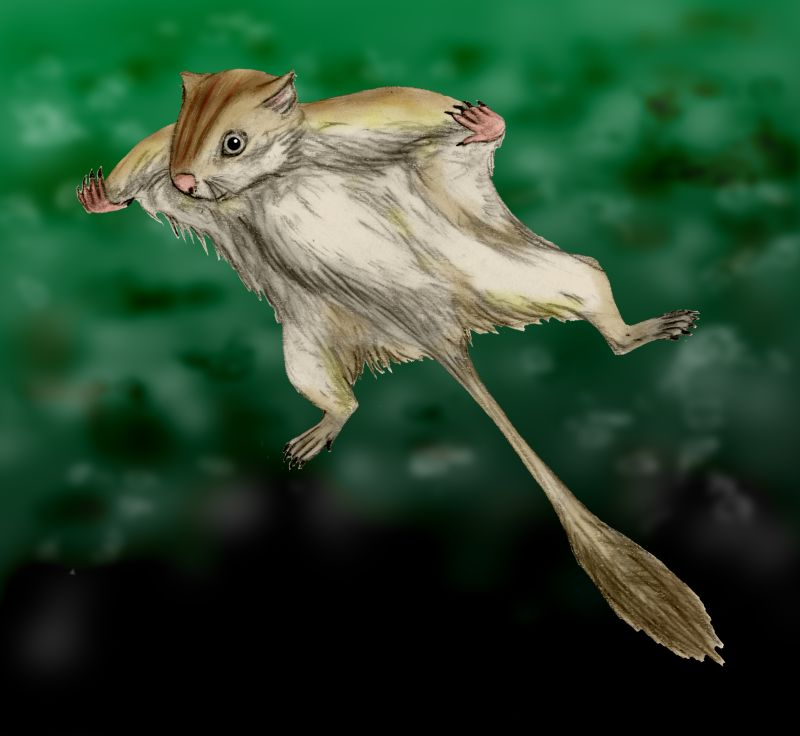
- Life restoration of Eomys quercyi

Scientific classification
- Kingdom: Animalia
- Phylum: Chordata
- Class: Mammalia
- Order: Rodentia
- Family: †Eomyidae
- Genus: †Eomys; Schlosser, 1884

Type species
- †Eomys zitteli Schlosser, 1884

= Eomys =

Eomys Temporal range: Late Oligocene, Rupelian-Chattian

Extinct genus of rodents

Eomys is an extinct genus of eomyid rodent from the late Oligocene of France, Germany, Spain, and possibly Turkey. The species Eomys quercyi is the earliest known gliding rodent.

== Species ==
Source: mindat.org

- E. alulghensis Cuenca & Canudo, 1994
- E. antiquus (Aymard, 1853)
- E. ebnatensis Engesser, 1987
- E. fahlbuschi Ünay-Bayraktar, 1989
- E. gigas Comte & Vianey-Liaud, 1987
- E. helveticus Engesser & Kalin, 2017
- E. huerzeleri Engesser, 1982
- E. major Freudenberg, 1941
- E. molassicus Engesser, 1987
- E. minor Comte & Vianey-Liaud, 1987
- E. quercyi Comte & Vianey-Liaud, 1987
- E. schluneggeri Engesser & Kalin, 2017
