= Pseudoltinomys =

Pseudoltinomys Temporal range: Middle Eocene - Early Oligocene

Scientific classification
- Kingdom: Animalia
- Phylum: Chordata
- Class: Mammalia
- Order: Rodentia
- Family: †Theridomyidae
- Subfamily: †Issiodoromyinae
- Genus: †Pseudoltinomys; Lavocat, 1951

Extinct genus of rodents

Pseudoltinomys is a prehistoric rodent that lived approximately 30 million years ago, during the Oligocene epoch. It outwardly resembles a gerbil, but may have been related to kangaroo rats or may represent an early offshoot of rodents with no modern relatives.
