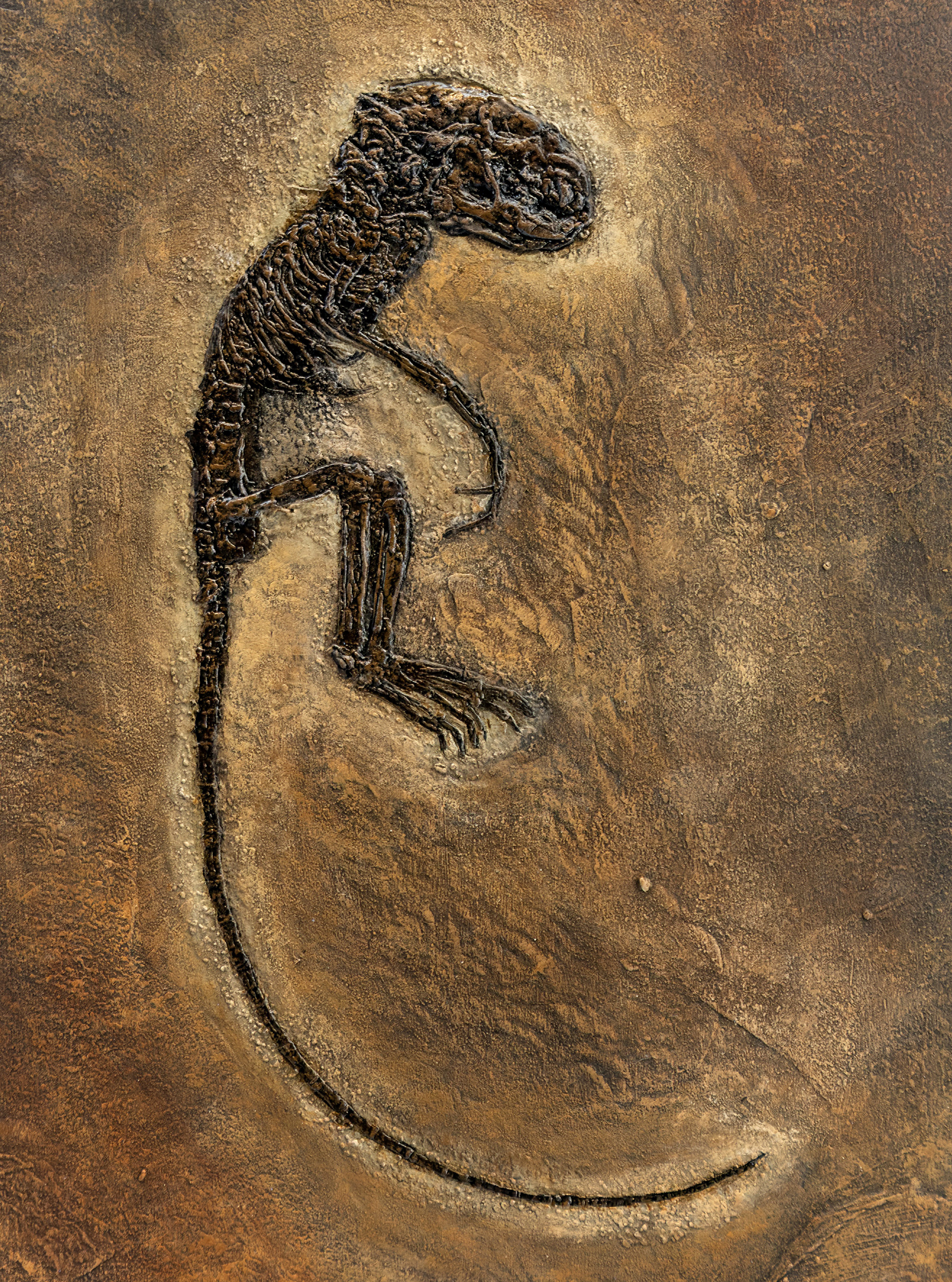
- Heterohyus fossil from Messel Pit, Royal Tyrrell Museum of Palaeontology

Scientific classification
- Kingdom: Animalia
- Phylum: Chordata
- Class: Mammalia
- Order: †Apatotheria
- Family: †Apatemyidae
- Genus: †Heterohyus; Gervais, 1848

Type species
- †Heterohyus nanus

= Heterohyus =

Heterohyus Temporal range: early to late Eocene

Extinct genus of mammals

Heterohyus is an extinct genus of apatemyid from the early to late Eocene. A small, tree-dwelling creature with elongated fore- and middle fingers, in these regards it somewhat resembled a modern-day aye-aye.

Three skeletons have been found at the early Eocene site at Messel Pit, Germany
