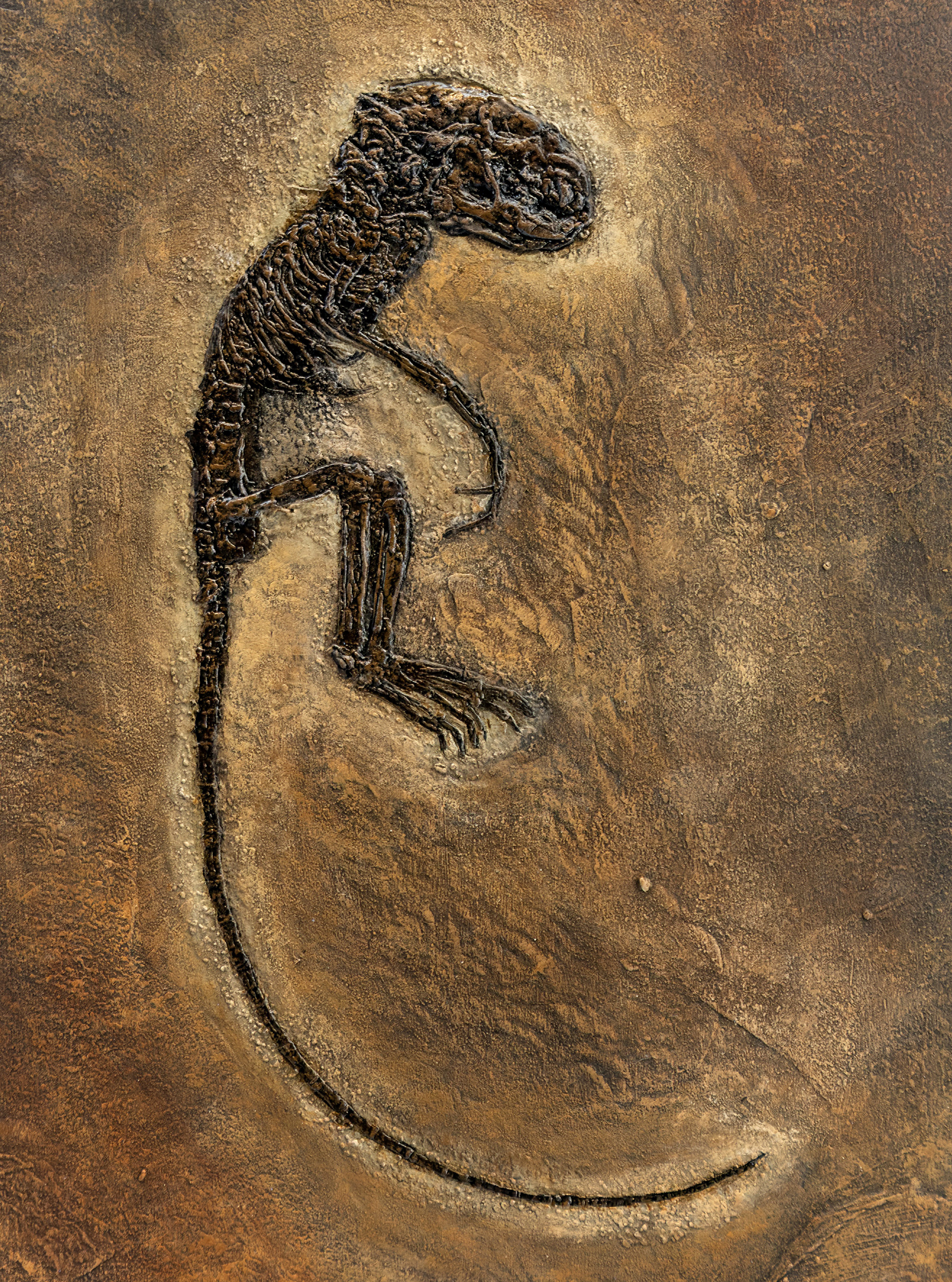
- Heterohyus nanus

Scientific classification
- Kingdom: Animalia
- Phylum: Chordata
- Class: Mammalia
- Superorder: Euarchontoglires (?)
- Order: †Apatotheria; Scott & Jepsen, 1936
- Family: †Apatemyidae; Matthew, 1909

Genera
- †Aethomylos; †Apatemys; †Asiapator; †Carcinella; †Frugivastodon; †Heterohyus; †Jepsenella; †Labidolemur; †Sinclairella; †Unuchinia

= Apatemyidae =

Apatemyidae Temporal range: Paleocene–Oligocene

Extinct family of mammals

Apatemyidae is an extinct family of placental mammals that took part in the first placental evolutionary radiation together with other early mammals, such as the leptictids. Their relationships to other mammal groups are controversial; a 2010 study found them to be basal members of Euarchontoglires.

Common in North America during the Paleocene, they are also represented in Europe by the genus Jepsenella.

== Apatemyids in life ==
Like most Paleocene mammals, the apatemyids were small and presumably insectivorous. Size ranged from that of a dormouse to a large rat. The toes were slender and well clawed, and the family were probably mainly arboreal. The skull was fairly massive compared to the otherwise slender skeleton, and the front teeth were long and hooked, resembling those of the modern aye-aye, both whom make their living by gnawing off bark with their front teeth to get at grubs and maggots beneath.
