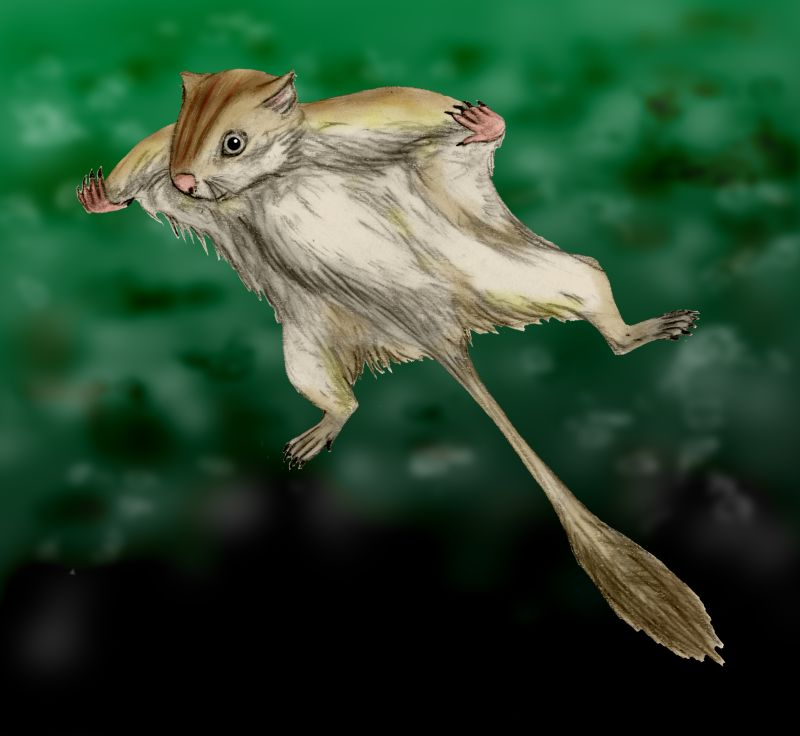
- Artist's impression of Eomys

Scientific classification
- Kingdom: Animalia
- Phylum: Chordata
- Class: Mammalia
- Infraclass: Placentalia
- Order: Rodentia
- Superfamily: †Eomyoidea; Winge, 1887
- Family: †Eomyidae; Winge, 1887

Subfamilies
- †Apeomyinae †Eomyinae †Yoderimyinae

= Eomyidae =

Eomyidae Temporal range: Middle Eocene–Pleistocene

Extinct family of rodents

Eomyidae is a family of extinct rodents from North America and Eurasia related to modern day pocket gophers and kangaroo rats. They are known from the Middle Eocene to the Late Miocene in North America and from the Late Eocene to the Pleistocene in Eurasia. Eomyids were generally small, but occasionally large, and tended to be squirrel-like in form and habits. The family includes the earliest known gliding rodent, Eomys quercyi.

The family includes the following genera:

- Simiacritomys (placement uncertain)
- Symplokeomys
- Subfamily Yoderimyinae
  - Litoyoderimys
  - Yoderimys
  - Zaisaneomys
  - Zemiodontomys
- Subfamily Apeomyinae
  - Apeomyoides
  - Apeomys
  - Arikareeomys
  - Megapeomys
  - Zophoapeomys
- Subfamily Eomyinae
  - Adjidaumo
  - Aguafriamys
  - Asianeomys
  - Aulolithomys
  - Centimanomys
  - Comancheomys
  - Cristadjidaumo
  - Cupressimus
  - Eomyodon
  - Eomyops
  - Eomys
  - Estramomys
  - Japaneomys
  - Kansasimys
  - Keramidomys
  - Leptodontomys
  - Ligerimys
  - Metadjidaumo
  - Metanoiamys
  - Meteomys
  - Montanamus
  - Namatomys
  - Neoadjidaumo
  - Orelladjidaumo
  - Paradjidaumo
  - Paranamatomys
  - Pentabuneomys
  - Protadjidaumo
  - Pseudadjidaumo
  - Pseudotheridomys
  - Rhodanomys
  - Ritteneria
  - Ronquillomys
  - Viejadjidaumo
