= Blainvillimys =

Blainvillimys Temporal range: Bartonian–Rupelian

Scientific classification
- Kingdom: Animalia
- Phylum: Chordata
- Class: Mammalia
- Order: Rodentia
- Family: †Theridomyidae
- Genus: †Blainvillimys; Gervais, 1848

Type species
- Blainvillimys blainvillei Gervais, 1848

Other species
- Blainvillimys avus Stehlin and Schaub, 1951; Blainvillimys gemellus Vianey-Liaud, 1989; Blainvillimys gregarius Schlosser, 1884; Blainvillimys helmeri Vianey-Liaud, 1972; Blainvillimys langei Vianey-Liaud, 1972; Blainvillimys rotundidens Schlosser, 1884

Extinct genus of theridomyid rodent

Blainvillimys is an extinct genus of theridomyid rodents that lived in Europe from the Bartonian stage to the Rupelian stage, during the Eocene and Oligocene epoch.

== Distribution ==
Blainvillimys blainvillei is known from France and Switzerland. Blainvillimys avus is known exclusively from France, as is Blanvillimys gemellus. Blainvillimys gregarius is known from France, Switzerland, and Spain, while Blainvillimys helmeri is known from all the same countries as B. gregarius but is also known from Germany. Blainvillimys langei is known from France and Spain, as is Blainvillimys rotundidens.
