= Synaphodus =

Synaphodus Temporal range: Oligocene (stratigraphic range uncertain)

Scientific classification
- Kingdom: Animalia
- Phylum: Chordata
- Class: Mammalia
- Order: Artiodactyla
- Family: †Dichobunidae
- Subfamily: †Dichobuninae
- Genus: †Synaphodus; Pomel, 1848
- Species: †S. brachygnathus

Binomial name
- †Synaphodus brachygnathus Pomel, 1848

Synonyms
- Sinaphodus brachygnathus Pomel, 1853

Extinct genus of early artiodactyls

Synaphodus is an extinct genus of artiodactyls belonging to the basal family Dichobunidae. It was endemic to western Europe and lived during the Oligocene, although its specific temporal range is uncertain. Despite having only one recognized species S. brachygnathus, it has had a complicated taxonomic history due to the genus name, established by the French palaeontologist Auguste Pomel in 1848, being applied early on for a species that was eventually reclassified under the suoid genus Propalaeochoerus. It was a large-sized member of the Dichobuninae similar to Metriotherium but differed from it by its more bunodont (round and low cusps) dentition among other differences. As one of the few dichobunines of the Oligocene, it would have coexisted with immigrant faunas after the Grande Coupure extinction event and surviving faunas within western Europe.

== Taxonomy ==
In 1848, the secretary of French palaeontologist Jean-Louis Hardouin Michelin de Choisy, named Mr. Bayle, wrote about a presentation given by French palaeontologist Auguste Pomel, who gave mention to an artiodactyl genus named Synaphodus, assigning Anthracotherium gergovianum (originally named by French palaeontologist Jean-Baptiste Croizet) to it without further explanation. The same year, Pomel also erected the genus name Brachygnatus for the same species. He also wrote about the species Synaphodus brachygnathus, explaining that its dentition was similar to that of Anoplotherium and had continuous dentition meaning short diastemata. The etymology of Synaphodus derives from the Ancient Greek words σύναψη (union) and ὀδούς (tooth) in reference to the continuous dentition on the holotype mandible.

In 1848–1852, French palaeontologist Paul Gervais tentatively listed A? gergovianum, explaining that he thought that its molars were more similar to those of Dichobune than Anthracotherium. He noted that the species was listed under three genus names, namely Cyclognathus, Brachygnathus, and Synaphodus. In 1853, Pomel listed the species name Synaphodus gergovianus based on a mandible with dentition, of which Anthracotherium gergovianus and Sinaphodus brachygnathus (the latter name created by him as well) are synonyms. He also defined Cyclognathus as being synonymous with Cainotherium. In 1899, Swiss palaeontologist Hans Georg Stehlin suggested that the synonymous names Synaphodus brachygnathus and Synaphodus gergovianus are invalid and that their specimens can be classified under Palaeochoerus. After Stehlin erected Propalaeochoerus the same year, P. gergovianus as originally named by Croizet has since been assigned to it.

The taxonomic status of Synaphodus had often been overlooked by taxonomists of the 20th century, as noted by Jean Sudre. In 1951, French palaeontologist René Lavocat revived Synaphodus brachygnathus as a valid genus and species belonging to the Dichobunidae based on the mandible studied in 1853 by Pomel. The validity of Synaphodus was followed by Sudre in 1978, who stated that it was distinct enough from its close relative Metriotherium.

=== Classification ===
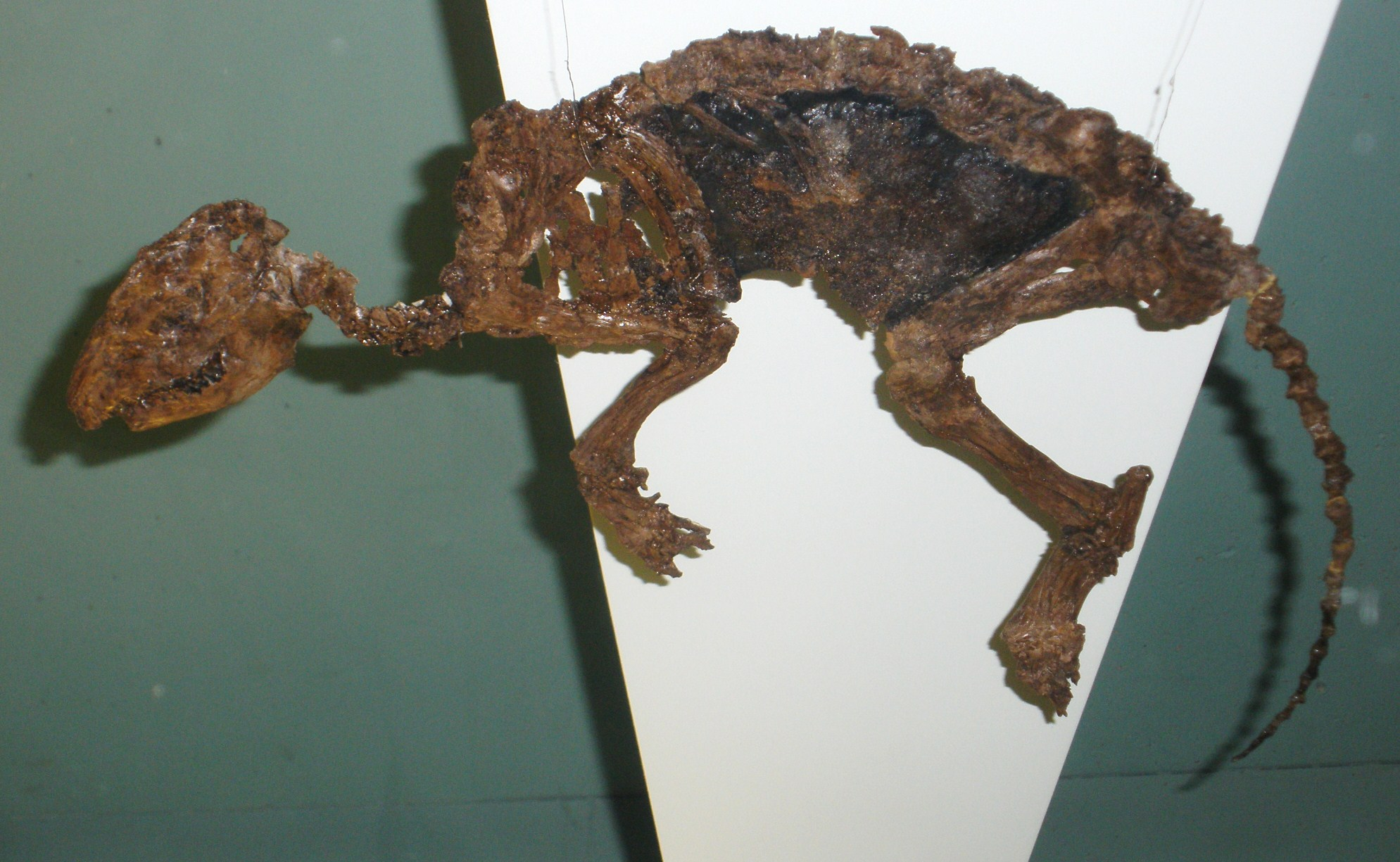
Skeleton of the related Aumelasia cf. gabineaudi, an early dichobunine

Synaphodus belongs to the subfamily Dichobuninae within the Dichobunidae, an extinct early artiodactyl family within the superfamily Dichobunoidea. The Dichobunoidea is a paraphyletic group of basal artiodactyls appearing in the Early Eocene that gave way to various other artiodactyl clades, extant and extinct. The Dichobunoidea is considered by researchers to consist of seven families: Cebochoeridae, Diacodexeidae, Dichobunidae, Helohyidae, Homacodontidae, Leptochoeridae, and Raoellidae (although not all researchers agree that the Raeoellidae is a dichobunoid family). Despite the consensus that the Dichobunoidea is a paraphyletic group, researchers are still investigating the extent to which certain members are stem taxa to other major artiodactyl clades. At least some dichobunoid families are thought to be monophyletic while others are paraphyletic, some of whom may even be polyphyletic; the latter grouping means that some clades need to be reassessed.

Some of the earliest artiodactyls to have appeared in the fossil record by the Early Eocene are dichobunoids that have simultaneously appeared in North America, Europe, and Asia. In both North America and Europe, species classified to Diacodexis are the earliest records of artiodactyls in both continents that extend back to the Wasatchian of the North American land mammal age and MP7 of the Mammal Palaeogene zones of Europe, respectively (Diacodexis and the Diacodexeidae are thought to both be polyphyletic). In Asia, some of the earliest artiodactyl genera, who correlate to equivalent ages, are the possible suiform Wutuhyus and dichobunoid Tsaganohyus. In the Early to Middle Eocene within the three continents, the artiodactyls were common mammals of small to medium sizes that generally had bunodont to bunoselenodont (bunodont plus selenodont) dentitions, thus making them important for biostratigraphy.

The Dichobunidae is a family of artiodactyls known from both Europe and Asia that contains multiple subfamilies: Dichobuninae, Hyperdichobuninae, Eurodexinae, and Lantianiinae. Members of both Europe and Asia appeared as early as the Early Eocene, evident by the early appearance of Eolantianus in Asia and those of other dichobunid genera like Protodichobune and Aumelasia in Europe by MP10. Both of the early dichobunids Protodichobune and Aumelasia, along with Dichobune, are genera belonging to the Dichobuninae. While most species of the subfamily are recorded exclusively from western Europe, one other species pending assessment as "Dichobune sp." is recorded from the Lushi Formation in China, although its status within the Dichobunidae is unclear. The Dichobuninae, and the wider Dichobunidae by extent, lasted up to the Late Oligocene, evident by the range of the dichobunine Metriotherium extending up to MP27.

In 2020, Vincent Luccisano et al. created a phylogenetic tree of the basal artiodactyls, a majority endemic to western Europe, from the Palaeogene. The results found the Dichobunidae, except for Aumelasia, as a paraphyletic stem group in relation to other artiodactyls. Both the Dichobuninae and Hyperdichobuninae are recovered as paraphyletic groups. Luccisano et al. noted the lack of phylogenetic resolution of the dichobunid subfamilies to each other and to other artiodactyl clades, which follows results from earlier studies and means that more research needs to be done for dichobunid phylogenetics. The phylogenetic tree as produced by the authors is shown below:

- Artiodactyla
  - Bunophorus
  - - Gunophorus
    - Diacodexis
  - - - Protodichobune
      - Eurodexis
    - - - Buxobune
        - - Mouillacitherium
          - Meniscodon
        - - - Hyperdichobune
            - - Dichobune robertiana
              - - Dichobune leporina
                - - Homacodon
                  - - Gobiohyus
                    - Suina
                      - - Khirtharia
                        - Entelodon
                      - - Palaeocheorus
                        - Perchoerus
          - - Haplobunodontidae
              - Haplobunodon
              - - Cuisitherium
                - Lophiobunodon
            - - Mixtotherium
              - - Robiacina
                - - - - Dacrytherium
                      - Diplobune
                    - - Xiphodon
                      - Paraxiphodon
                  - - - Cainotherium
                      - Paroxacron
                    - - Archaeomeryx
                      - - Amphimeryx
                        - Pseudamphimeryx
      - - Aumelasia
        - - - Hallebune
            - Amphirhagatherium
          - - Cebochoeridae
              - Cebochoerus
              - Gervachoerus
            - - Choeropotamus
              - Siamotherium

In 2023, Abhay Rautela and Sunil Bajpai created an analysis on the phylogenetic relationships between basal artiodactyls by compiling a matrix of dental remains of 34 artiodactyl species; most of these artiodactyl species are dichobunoids (Diacodexeidae, Dichobunidae, Homacodontidae, Cebochoeridae, Leptochoeridae, Raoellidae), but some are members of the Pakicetidae and one other species is a member of the Helohyidae (the basal placental mammal Protungulatum is the outgroup taxon in the analysis). Below is a cladogram by Rautela and Bajpai of the artiodactyl taxa based on a 50% majority consensus:

- Artiodactyla
  - Protungulatum
  - - Eurodexis
    - - - Diacodexis antunesi
        - - Chorlakkia
          - - Lantianiinae
              - Elaschitotherium
              - - Eolantianius
                - Mouillacitherium
            - Homacodontidae
              - - Asiohomacodon
                - Limeryx
              - - Gobiohyus
                - Dichobuninae
                  - Buxobune
                  - - Dichobune
                    - Homacodon
      - - - Diacodexis varleti
          - - Pakicetidae
              - Pakicetus
              - - Ichthyolestes
                - Nalacetus
            - - Diacodexis gazini
              - - Protodichobune
                - - Aumelasia
                  - - Gervachoerus
                    - - Raoellidae
                        - Khirtharia
                        - - Indohyus
                          - Rajouria
        - - Gujaratia
          - Diacodexeidae
            - - Diacodexis secans
              - - Diacodexis gigasei
                - - Diacodexis ilicis
                  - Simpsonodus
            - - - Diacodexis gracilis
                - Diacodexis morrisi
              - - Bunophorus
                - Diacodexis minutus
                - Leptochoerus

As seen in the above phylogeny, one clade pairs Dichobune with Homacodon, Buxobune, and Gobiohyus based on specific dental traits. Based on the cladogram, Rautela and Bajpai defined Diacodexis, the Diacodexeidae, and Dichobunidae as all polyphyletic taxa. In the case of the dichobunines, this is because they are more closely paired with non-dichobunids than with the lantianiines (Eolantianus, Elaschitotherium) and hyperdichobunines (Mouillacitherium).

In 2022, Weppe conducted a phylogenetic analysis in his academic thesis regarding Palaeogene artiodactyl lineages, focusing most specifically on the endemic European families but also on European dichobunids. He found that the Dichobuninae was more closely related to the Cebochoeridae and species classified to the polyphyletic Choeropotamidae, contrasting with the Hyperdichobuninae, which was paraphyletic in relation to the other endemic European artiodactyl groups (Amphimerycidae, Anoplotheriidae, Xiphodontidae, Mixtotheriidae, and Cainotherioidea). Within the dichobunine clade, which includes Dichobune and Metriotherium, D. robertiana is defined as the plesiomorphic species that makes up the first branch and is followed by those of D. sigei, M. mirabile, and a clade consisting of D. jehennei and D. leporina. He also stated that the species named D. aff. robertiana had even more plesiomorphic traits than the other Dichobune species and supported the idea from prior literature that M. mirabile, D. jehennei, and D. leporina were more derived species within their subfamily. He defined Dichobune as being paraphyletic in relation to Metriotherium.

== Description ==
Dichobunoids are known for having the complete dental formula of 3.1.4.33.1.4.3 for a total of 44 teeth, consistent with the primitive dental formula for early-middle Palaeogene placental mammals. This is the case for the Dichobunidae, whose teeth are not much separated by diastemata and are bunodont (low and rounded cusps). Except for some of the oldest genera, dichobunids are also described as having molars (M/m) that generally have five to six tubercles (or cusps) each. The Dichobuninae is described as having unspecialized and rounded dentition, although it is more bunodont than in the earlier Diacodexeidae. In the upper premolars (P/p), the metaconule cusp is larger than the paraconule cusp. P^{3} has a protocone cusp while P_{4} has a metaconid cusp. P_{1} is premolariform in shape. The upper molars in dichobunines usually have three wide distal cusps along with a hypocone cusp. Within the six-cusped molars, the paracone, metacone, protocone, and metaconule cusps are the major types present while the paraconule and hypocone cusps are the secondary ones. In terms of cranial features, the Dichobuninae is diagnosed as having slightly elongated snouts.

Synaphodus is diagnosed as being a large-sized dichobunine similar to Metriotherium. Only the lower dentition of Synaphodus is known due to the upper dentition never having been found. Unlike with the selenodont (crescent-shaped ridges) Metriotherium, the dentition of Synaphodus is more bunodont (round and low cusps). Its canine is large-sized. The premolars have a paraconid cusp on them individually, and there is a noticeable lack of diastema between P_{2} and P_{3}. P_{4} in Synaphodus is longer than that of Metriotherium and has a well-developed metaconid at the lingual side's centre area.

== Palaeoecology ==
Although the Eocene-Oligocene transition marked long-term drastic cooling global climates, western Eurasia was still dominated by humid climates, albeit with dry winter seasons in the Oligocene. Europe during the Oligocene had environments largely adapted to winter-dry seasons and humid seasons that were composed of three separate vegetational belts by latitude, with temperate needleleaf-broadleaved or purely broadleaved deciduous forests aligning with the northernmost belt between 40°N and 50°N, the middle belt of warmth-adapted mixed mesophytic and evergreen broadleaved forests aligning between 40°N and 30°N, and the last belt containing tropical vegetation aligning below 30°N.

The exact stratigraphic range of Synaphodus, while suggested to be exclusive to the Oligocene, remains uncertain. The Eocene environmental trends and faunal assemblages of western Europe differed dramatically from those of the continent in the Oligocene due to warmer and subtropical climates plus strong levels of endemism given the isolation of western Europe as an archipelago from other landmasses by the early Eocene. The Dichobuninae, which Synaphadus belongs to, was one of the European artiodactyl groups endemic to Europe.

Given that it was most likely exclusive to the Oligocene, it would have coexisted with post-Grande Coupure survivors as well as non-endemic immigrant faunas originating from eastern Eurasia. Examples of immigrant faunas include later anthracotheres, ruminants (Gelocidae, Lophiomerycidae, and Bachitheriidae), rhinocerotoids (Rhinocerotidae, Amynodontidae, and Eggysodontidae), carnivorans (Nimravidae, Ursidae and later Amphicyonidae), eastern Eurasian rodents (Eomyidae, Cricetidae, and Castoridae), and eulipotyphlans (Erinaceidae).
