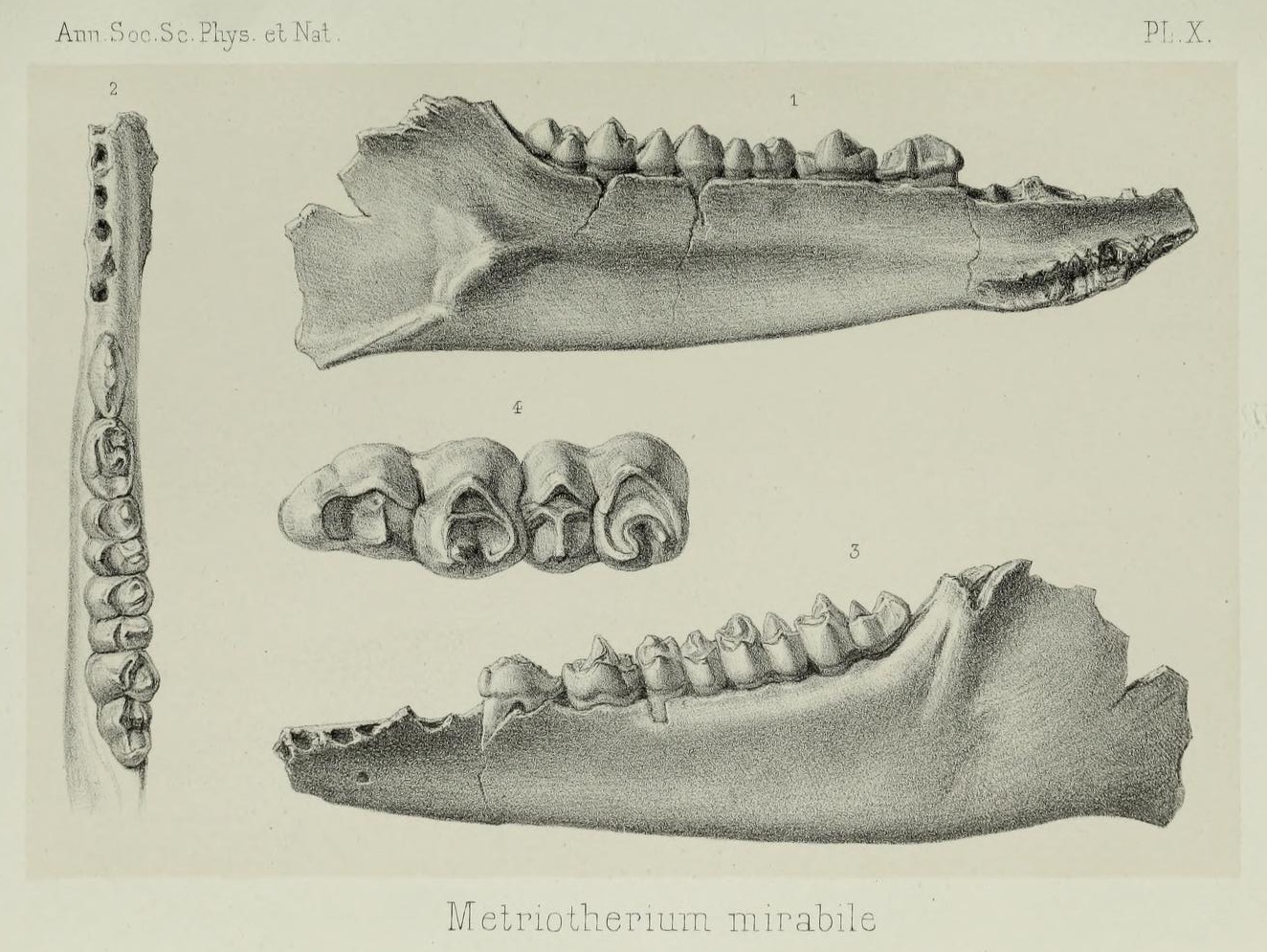
- Illustration of a mandible of M. mirabile

Scientific classification
- Kingdom: Animalia
- Phylum: Chordata
- Class: Mammalia
- Order: Artiodactyla
- Family: †Dichobunidae
- Subfamily: †Dichobuninae
- Genus: †Metriotherium; Filhol, 1882

Type species
- †Metriotherium mirabile Filhol, 1882

Other species
- †M. paulum Stehlin, 1906; †M. minutum Sudre, 1980; †M. sarelense Astruc et al., 2003

Synonyms
- Genus synonymy: Mesotherium Filhol, 1880 (preoccupied); Deilotherium Filhol, 1882; Spaniotherium Filhol, 1882; Synonyms of M. mirabile: Mesotherium mirabile Filhol, 1880; Deilotherium simplex Filhol, 1882; Spaniotherium speciosum Filhol, 1882

= Metriotherium =

Metriotherium Temporal range: Early Oligocene – Late Oligocene 32.5–24.5 Ma

Extinct genus of early artiodactyls

Metriotherium is an extinct genus of artiodactyls belonging to the basal family Dichobunidae. It was endemic to western Europe and lived from the Early to Late Oligocene. Metriotherium and its type species M. mirabile were first named by the French naturalist Henri Filhol in 1882, although it was originally named "Mesotherium" in 1880, a name that had been preoccupied decades prior by a separate mammal genus in South America. In total, there are four valid species assigned to the genus.

In comparison to its likely ancestor Dichobune, Metriotherium consists mainly of larger-sized species relative to other members of the Dichobuninae and had selenodont (crescent-like ridges) dentition. It is defined as a distinct dichobunine genus on the basis of some very specific dental morphologies, with some species being known only from isolated dental remains. Whereas the earliest-appearing species M. minutum and the latest M. sarelense were recorded to be smaller-sized species, M. mirabile, with a temporal range occurring roughly in between the two species, was larger in size. It lived in humid but seasonal climates and only briefly overlapped in range with Dichobune in the Early Oligocene before being the last dichobunid known to have existed in Europe up to the Late Oligocene.

== Taxonomy ==
In 1880, the French palaeontologist Henri Filhol said that he studied a lower maxilla with continuous dentition from the deposits of Caylux, recording that its teeth was similar to that of Anoplotherium but still had specific differences from it. He opted to assign to it the name Mesotherium mirabile. In 1882, Filhol recognized that the name Mesotherium was already used prior to his 1880 naming and hence was preoccupied. Thus, he gave it the new genus name Metriotherium, giving it a more thorough diagnosis based on its lower dentition but noting that the upper dentition was unknown. He confirmed the dental similarities to the anoplotheriids Anoplotherium and Diplobune but also stated its crest arrangements somewhat mirrored those of both Lophiodon and Pachynolophus. Filhol also named two additional genera based on dental fossils similar to that of Dichobune, each with a newly named species: Deilotherium simplex and Spaniotherium speciosum. As explained by American zoologist Theodore Sherman Palmer in 1904, the name Mesotherium as given by Filhol in 1880 was preoccupied due to it already having been used towards a genus of mammal belonging to the suborder Typotheria by the French naturalist Étienne Serres beginning in 1857. The etymology of the name Metriotherium is derived from the Ancient Greek words μέτρῐος (moderate) and θήρ (beast or wild animal) meaning "moderate beast". The other two names Deilotherium and Spaniotherium, in Ancient Greek, mean "cowardly beast" and "rare beast", respectively.

In 1885, British naturalist Richard Lydekker suggested that Metriotherium might be a synonym of Lophiomeryx. On the other hand, multiple other palaeontologists of the 19th century treated Metriotherium as a valid genus, namely the Swiss palaeontologist Ludwig Rütimeyer in 1891 and Karl Alfred von Zittel in 1891–1893. The latter palaeontologist appeared to have questioned the validities of Deilotherium and Spaniotherium, evident by the question marks placed before their names.

In 1906, the Swiss palaeontologist Hans Georg Stehlin discussed the taxonomic status of Metriotherium. Due to the similarities of the dental fossils assigned to the genera, Stehlin synonymized Deilotherium and Spaniotherium with Metriotherium as well as the former two genera's species (D. simplex and S. speciosum) with M. mirabile. He then erected the species M. paulum based on upper molars from the French commune of Bach. In 1980, Michel Brunet and Jean Sudre erected M. minutum based on a right-side mandible with dentition from the French locality of Villebramar. The species name is simply based on the species' small size relative to others in the same genus. In 2003, Jean Guy Astruc et al. listed the new species M. sarelense, a name credited to Sudre, one of the paper's coauthors. M. sarelense is based on dental remains, and its name is derived from its type locality of Sarèle, found in the French department of Gard. According to Jessica M. Theodor in 2007, Metriotherium is "in need of revision" due to some species only being defined by isolated teeth.

=== Classification ===
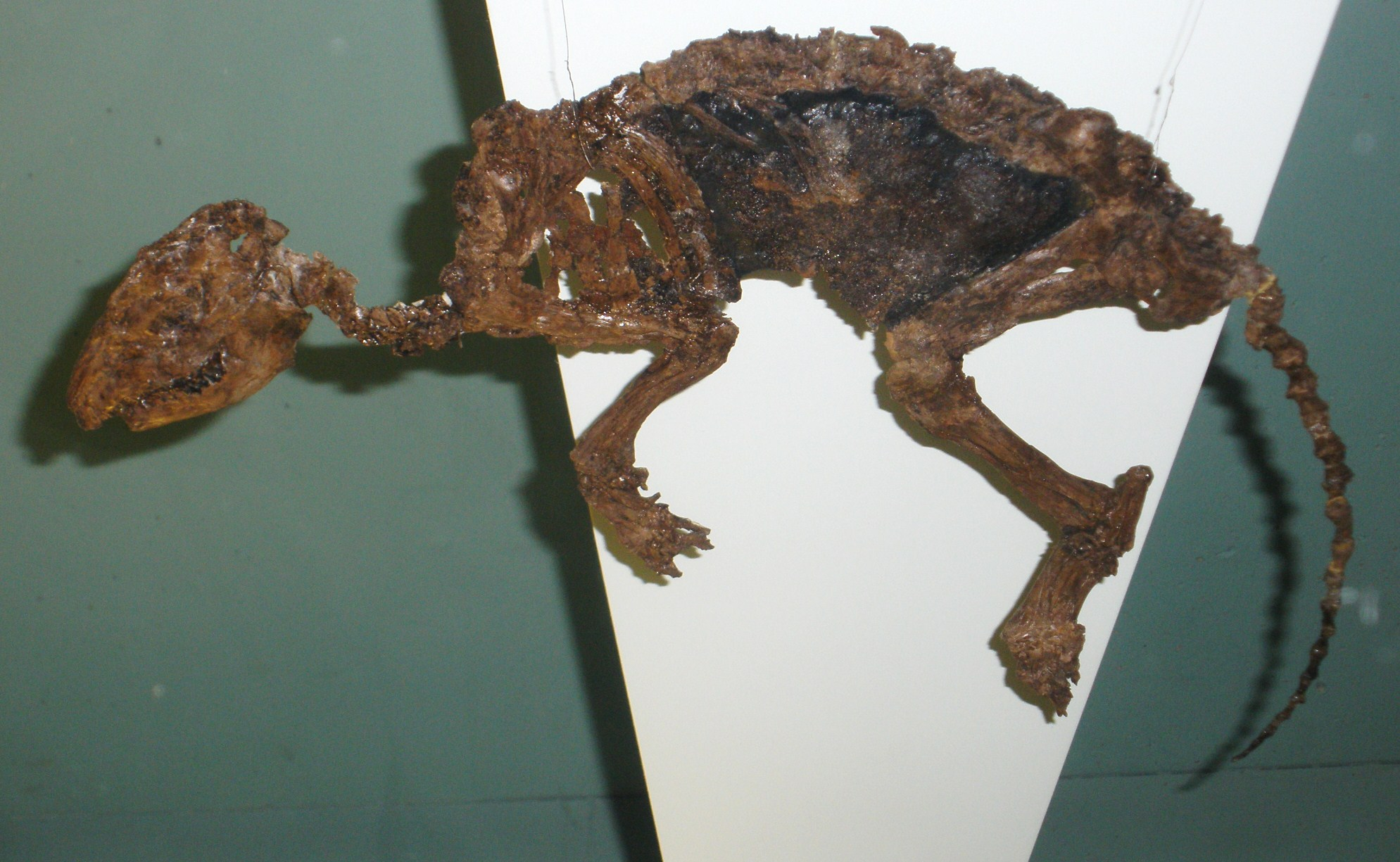
Skeleton of the related Aumelasia cf. gabineaudi, an early dichobunine

Metriotherium belongs to the subfamily Dichobuninae within the Dichobunidae, an extinct early artiodactyl family within the superfamily Dichobunoidea. The Dichobunoidea is a paraphyletic group of basal artiodactyls appearing in the Early Eocene that gave way to various other artiodactyl clades, extant and extinct. The Dichobunoidea is considered by researchers to consist of seven families: Cebochoeridae, Diacodexeidae, Dichobunidae, Helohyidae, Homacodontidae, Leptochoeridae, and Raoellidae (although not all researchers agree that the Raeoellidae is a dichobunoid family). Despite the consensus that the Dichobunoidea is a paraphyletic group, researchers are still investigating the extent to which certain members are stem taxa to other major artiodactyl clades. At least some dichobunoid families are thought to be monophyletic while others are paraphyletic, some of whom may even be polyphyletic; the latter grouping means that some clades need to be reassessed.

Some of the earliest artiodactyls to have appeared in the fossil record by the Early Eocene are dichobunoids that have simultaneously appeared in North America, Europe, and Asia. In both North America and Europe, species classified to Diacodexis are the earliest records of artiodactyls in both continents that extend back to the Wasatchian of the North American land mammal age and MP7 of the Mammal Palaeogene zones of Europe, respectively (Diacodexis and the Diacodexeidae are thought to both be polyphyletic). In Asia, some of the earliest artiodactyl genera, who correlate to equivalent ages, are the possible suiform Wutuhyus and dichobunoid Tsaganohyus. In the Early to Middle Eocene within the three continents, the artiodactyls were common mammals of small to medium sizes that generally had bunodont to bunoselenodont (bunodont plus selenodont) dentitions, thus making them important for biostratigraphy.

The Dichobunidae is a family of artiodactyls known from both Europe and Asia that contains multiple subfamilies: Dichobuninae, Hyperdichobuninae, Eurodexinae, and Lantianiinae. Members of both Europe and Asia appeared as early as the Early Eocene, evident by the early appearance of Eolantianus in Asia and those of other dichobunid genera like Protodichobune and Aumelasia in Europe by MP10. Both of the early dichobunids Protodichobune and Aumelasia, along with Dichobune, are genera belonging to the Dichobuninae. While most species of the subfamily are recorded exclusively from western Europe, one other species pending assessment as "Dichobune sp." is recorded from the Lushi Formation in China, although its status within the Dichobunidae is unclear. The Dichobuninae, and the wider Dichobunidae by extent, lasted up to the Late Oligocene, evident by the range of the dichobunine Metriotherium extending up to MP27.

In 2020, Vincent Luccisano et al. created a phylogenetic tree of the basal artiodactyls, a majority endemic to western Europe, from the Palaeogene. The results found the Dichobunidae, except for Aumelasia, as a paraphyletic stem group in relation to other artiodactyls. Both the Dichobuninae and Hyperdichobuninae are recovered as paraphyletic groups. Luccisano et al. noted the lack of phylogenetic resolution of the dichobunid subfamilies to each other and to other artiodactyl clades, which follows results from earlier studies and means that more research needs to be done for dichobunid phylogenetics. The phylogenetic tree as produced by the authors is shown below:

- Artiodactyla
  - Bunophorus
  - - Gunophorus
    - Diacodexis
  - - - Protodichobune
      - Eurodexis
    - - - Buxobune
        - - Mouillacitherium
          - Meniscodon
        - - - Hyperdichobune
            - - Dichobune robertiana
              - - Dichobune leporina
                - - Homacodon
                  - - Gobiohyus
                    - Suina
                      - - Khirtharia
                        - Entelodon
                      - - Palaeocheorus
                        - Perchoerus
          - - Haplobunodontidae
              - Haplobunodon
              - - Cuisitherium
                - Lophiobunodon
            - - Mixtotherium
              - - Robiacina
                - - - - Dacrytherium
                      - Diplobune
                    - - Xiphodon
                      - Paraxiphodon
                  - - - Cainotherium
                      - Paroxacron
                    - - Archaeomeryx
                      - - Amphimeryx
                        - Pseudamphimeryx
      - - Aumelasia
        - - - Hallebune
            - Amphirhagatherium
          - - Cebochoeridae
              - Cebochoerus
              - Gervachoerus
            - - Choeropotamus
              - Siamotherium

In 2023, Abhay Rautela and Sunil Bajpai created an analysis on the phylogenetic relationships between basal artiodactyls by compiling a matrix of dental remains of 34 artiodactyl species; most of these artiodactyl species are dichobunoids (Diacodexeidae, Dichobunidae, Homacodontidae, Cebochoeridae, Leptochoeridae, Raoellidae), but some are members of the Pakicetidae and one other species is a member of the Helohyidae (the basal placental mammal Protungulatum is the outgroup taxon in the analysis). Below is a cladogram by Rautela and Bajpai of the artiodactyl taxa based on a 50% majority consensus:

- Artiodactyla
  - Protungulatum
  - - Eurodexis
    - - - Diacodexis antunesi
        - - Chorlakkia
          - - Lantianiinae
              - Elaschitotherium
              - - Eolantianius
                - Mouillacitherium
            - Homacodontidae
              - - Asiohomacodon
                - Limeryx
              - - Gobiohyus
                - Dichobuninae
                  - Buxobune
                  - - Dichobune
                    - Homacodon
      - - - Diacodexis varleti
          - - Pakicetidae
              - Pakicetus
              - - Ichthyolestes
                - Nalacetus
            - - Diacodexis gazini
              - - Protodichobune
                - - Aumelasia
                  - - Gervachoerus
                    - - Raoellidae
                        - Khirtharia
                        - - Indohyus
                          - Rajouria
        - - Gujaratia
          - Diacodexeidae
            - - Diacodexis secans
              - - Diacodexis gigasei
                - - Diacodexis ilicis
                  - Simpsonodus
            - - - Diacodexis gracilis
                - Diacodexis morrisi
              - - Bunophorus
                - Diacodexis minutus
                - Leptochoerus

As seen in the above phylogeny, one clade pairs Dichobune with Homacodon, Buxobune, and Gobiohyus based on specific dental traits. Based on the cladogram, Rautela and Bajpai defined Diacodexis, the Diacodexeidae, and Dichobunidae as all polyphyletic taxa. In the case of the dichobunines, this is because they are more closely paired with non-dichobunids than with the lantianiines (Eolantianus, Elaschitotherium) and hyperdichobunines (Mouillacitherium).

In 2022, Weppe conducted a phylogenetic analysis in his academic thesis regarding Palaeogene artiodactyl lineages, focusing most specifically on the endemic European families but also on European dichobunids. He found that the Dichobuninae was more closely related to the Cebochoeridae and species classified to the polyphyletic Choeropotamidae, contrasting with the Hyperdichobuninae, which was paraphyletic in relation to the other endemic European artiodactyl groups (Amphimerycidae, Anoplotheriidae, Xiphodontidae, Mixtotheriidae, and Cainotherioidea). Within the dichobunine clade, which includes Dichobune and Metriotherium, D. robertiana is defined as the plesiomorphic species that makes up the first branch and is followed by those of D. sigei, M. mirabile, and a clade consisting of D. jehennei and D. leporina. He also stated that the species named D. aff. robertiana had even more plesiomorphic traits than the other Dichobune species and supported the idea from prior literature that M. mirabile, D. jehennei, and D. leporina were more derived species within their subfamily. He defined Dichobune as being paraphyletic in relation to Metriotherium.

== Description ==
=== Skull and dentition ===
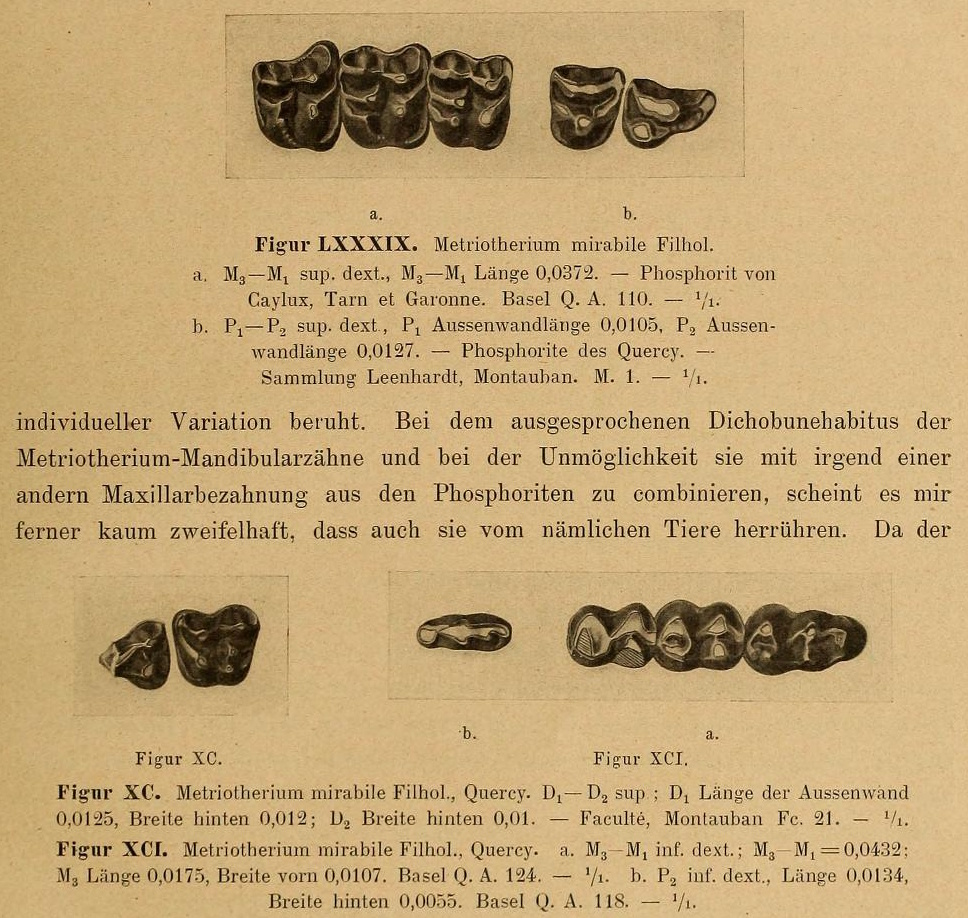
Illustration of the lower dentition of M. mirabile

Dichobunoids are known for having the complete dental formula of 3.1.4.33.1.4.3 for a total of 44 teeth, consistent with the primitive dental formula for early-middle Palaeogene placental mammals. This is the case for genera of the Dichobunidae like Metriotherium, whose teeth are not much separated by diastemata and are bunodont (low and rounded cusps). Except for some of the oldest genera, dichobunids are also described as having molars (M/m) that generally have five to six tubercles (or cusps) each. The Dichobuninae is described as having unspecialized and rounded dentition, although it is more bunodont than in the earlier Diacodexeidae. In the upper premolars (P/p), the metaconule cusp is larger than the paraconule cusp. P^{3} has a protocone cusp while P_{4} has a metaconid cusp. P_{1} is premolariform in shape. The upper molars in dichobunines usually have three wide distal cusps along with a hypocone cusp. Within the six-cusped molars, the paracone, metacone, protocone, and metaconule cusps are the major types present while the paraconule and hypocone cusps are the secondary ones. In terms of cranial features, the Dichobuninae is diagnosed as having slightly elongated snouts.

Metriotherium is diagnosed as being selenodont (crescent-like ridges) dentition, setting it apart from its close relatives with more bunodont (low and rounded cusps) dentition. The upper molars (M/m) are wider than they are long, their buccal (front relative to skull's face) is oblique because the positions of the paracone and metacone cusps have been shifted. They also have strong hypocone cusps with solid crested backs but lack paraconule cusps on them. On the lower molars, the cuspids are crested and have a trigonid region that is slightly higher than the talonid region. A loph-like cristid (or crest) transversely extends from the hypoconid cusp to the entoconid cusp.

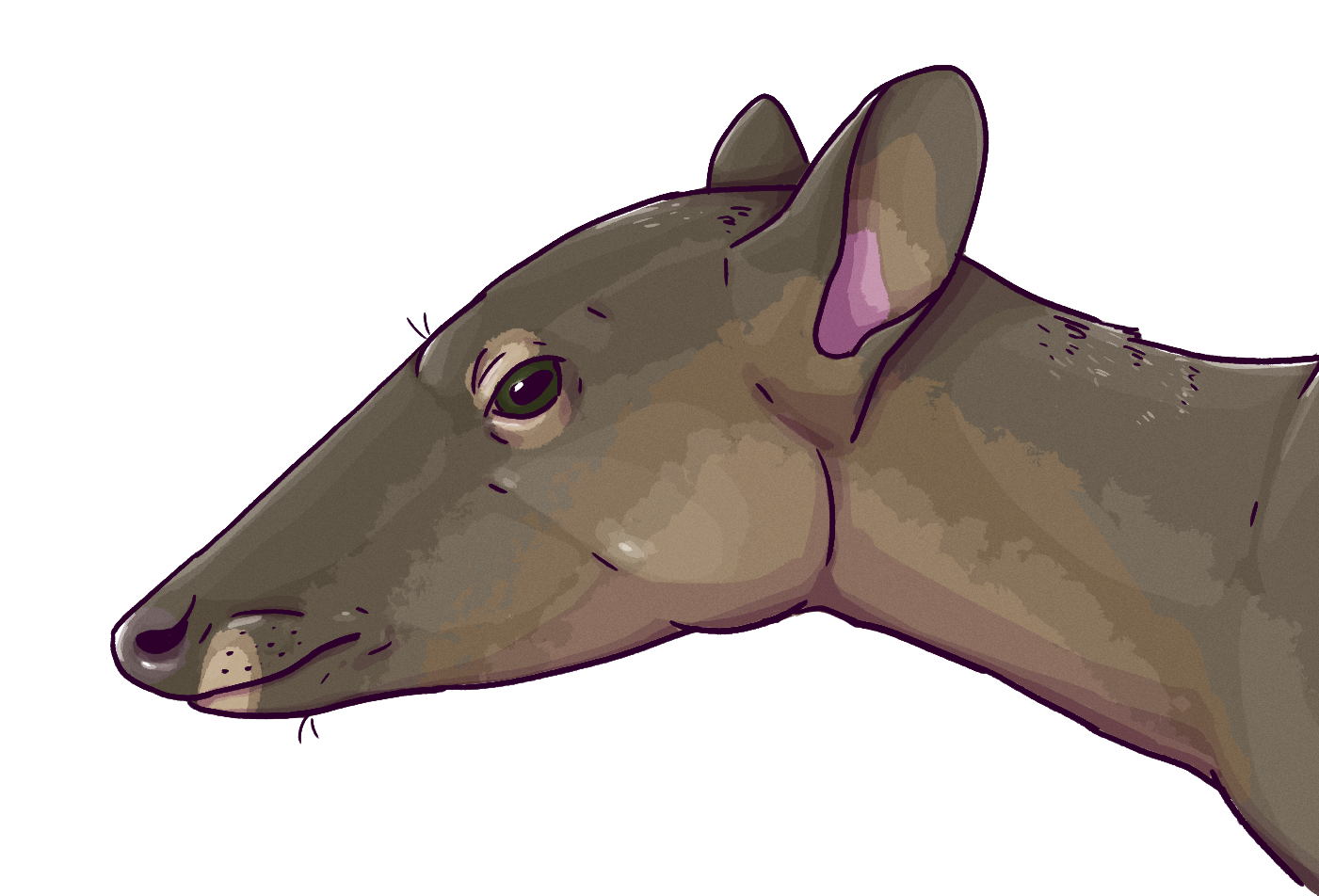
Restoration of the head of M. mirabile

The dental alveoli (tooth sockets) of a mandible of M. minutum suggest that the incisors, canines, and P_{1} are all narrow-shaped and single-rooted teeth while the other three premolars are elongated and double-rooted. M_{1} and M_{2} also are double-rooted while M_{3} has an additional root on its third lobe. Whereas the earlier species M. minutum has no diastemata between its teeth and has a bunoselenodont dentition, the later species M. mirabile has a diastema between M_{2} and M_{3} and is more selenodont in dentition. M. paulum has smaller molars and is less selenodont than M. minutum. The dentition of Metriotherium differs from that of its close relative Synaphodus by several traits, such as less bunodont teeth and a smaller and narrower P_{4} tooth. The dental morphologies of Dichobune and Metriotherium suggest that the former genus split into at least two different evolutionary branches that existed by the Oligocene, with one potentially ending in D. jehennei and the other descending into Metriotherium.

The mandible of M. minutum is narrow, its horizontal branch narrowing from the back end to the front end. The two mental foramina are present on the mandible, one below the area in between the canine and P_{1} and another below the back area of P_{3}. The angle of the mandible is rounded in shape, and the vertical branch is elevated in height immediately after M_{3} and has a larger height compared to that of D. jehennei, among the latest Dichobune species.

=== Size ===
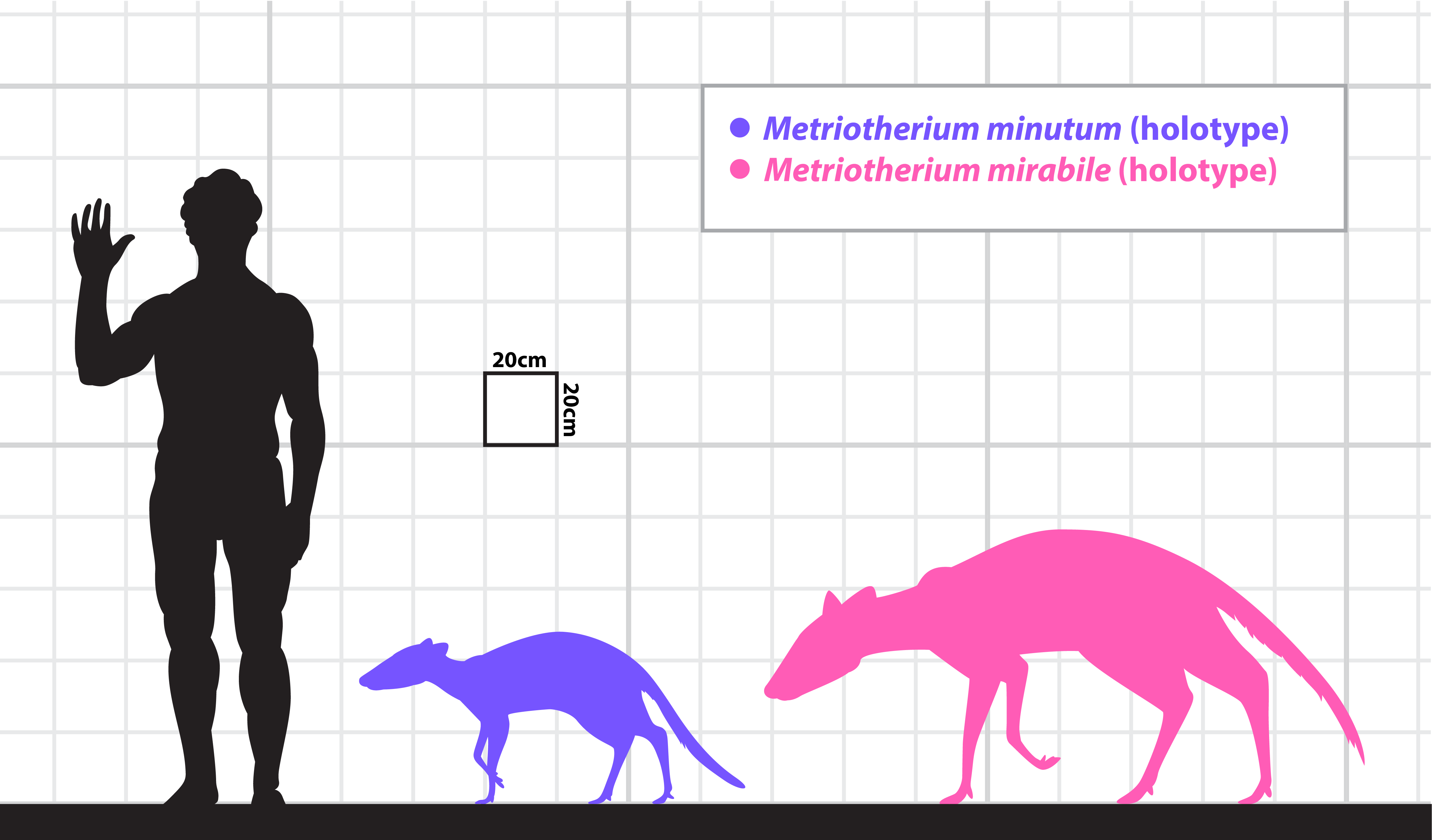
Estimated size comparison of M. minutum and M. mirabile based on known fossil material

The Dichobuninae is described as consisting of larger-sized dichobunids. Metriotherium in particular is defined as being a large-sized dichobunid, a trait that separates it from its likely ancestor Dichobune, which is described as a medium-sized dichobunid. Synaphodus is a close relative to Metriotherium that is also defined as being large-sized similar to it. M. mirabile is larger than both the earlier-appearing M. minutum and the later M. sarelense, both of which were recorded to be of similar sizes. M. mirabile also has larger molars compared to the other species, including M. paulum, which is described as a very small species. According to Theodor et al. in 2007, it is unclear if the older M. mirabile and the younger M. sarelense are actually distinct species or more representative of sexual dimorphism.

In regard to dental row measurements on mandibles belonging to M. minutum and M. mirabile, the former's lengths of the dental rows P_{1} to P_{4} and M_{1} to M_{3} and measure 45 mm (1.8 in) and 36.3 mm (1.43 in), respectively. In comparison, the M_{1} to M_{3} dental row of one mandible of M. mirabile measures 41 mm (1.6 in) long.

== Palaeoecology ==
=== Early Oligocene ===
Although the Eocene-Oligocene transition marked long-term drastic cooling global climates, western Eurasia was still dominated by humid climates, albeit with dry winter seasons in the Oligocene. Europe during the Oligocene had environments largely adapted to winter-dry seasons and humid seasons that were composed of three separate vegetational belts by latitude, with temperate needleleaf-broadleaved or purely broadleaved deciduous forests aligning with the northernmost belt between 40°N and 50°N, the middle belt of warmth-adapted mixed mesophytic and evergreen broadleaved forests aligning between 40°N and 30°N, and the last belt containing tropical vegetation aligning below 30°N.

While the age that M. paulum appeared in is unknown, those of other Metriotherium species have been well-recorded. In the Early Oligocene, M. minutum is the earliest-known species based on it appearing in the French locality of Villebramar, dating back to MP22. Its appearance overlaps with Dichobune, its likely ancestor that is also known from Villebramar. Other fossil mammal genera known from the locality include the cricetid Atavocricetodon, theridomyids Blainvillimys and Elfomys, hyaenodont Hyaenodon, nimravids (Eofelis, Nimravus, and Quercylurus), palaeothere Plagiolophus, eggysodontid Eggysodon, rhinocerotid Ronzotherium, entelodont Entelodon, anthracothere Anthracotherium, gelocid Gelocus, and the lophiomerycid Lophiomeryx. M. minutum is also recorded from Montalban, which dates to MP23.

=== Late Oligocene ===
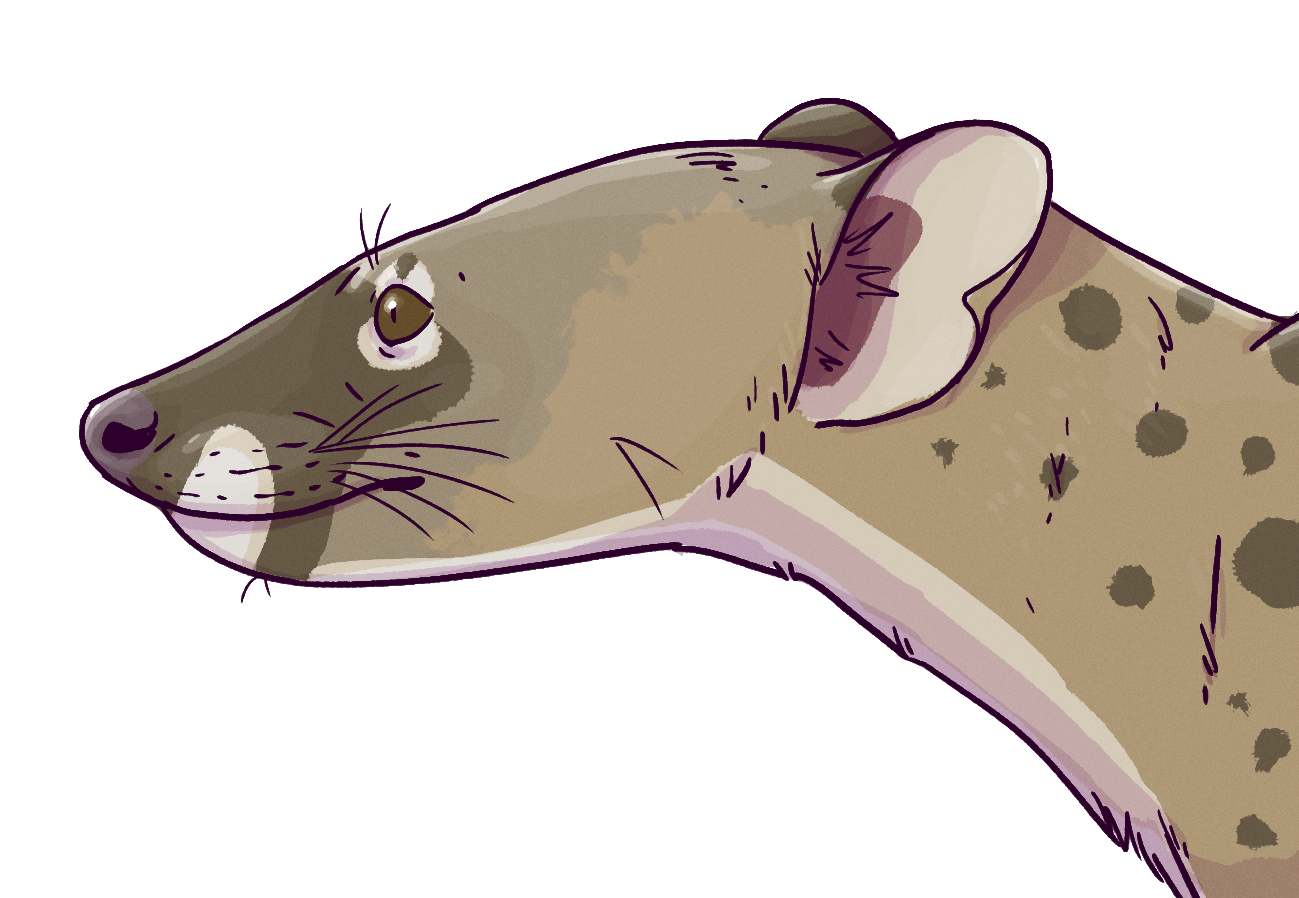
Restoration of Stenoplesictis, which also lived in the Oligocene of western Europe

The next species M. aff. mirabile is recorded from the French locality of Moissac-IV, which dates to MP24. Multiple sites dating to MP25 like Le Garouillas and Carrascosa del Campo records fossil evidence of M. mirabile; the species is known up to MP26 because of its appearance in Saint-André. In addition to M. mirabile, Le Garouillas also records the likes of nimravids (Quercylurus, Nimravus, Dinailurictis), the feliform Stenoplesictis, palaeothere Plagiolophus, rhinocerotid Ronzotherium, eggysodontid Eggysodon, amynodont Cadurcotherium, chalicothere Schizotherium, suoid Doliochoerus, cainothere Caenomeryx, anthracothere Anthracotherium, lophiomerycid Lophiomeryx, and the bachithere Bachitherium.

MP25 (middle Oligocene) records the last appearances of the entelodont Entelodon, amynodont Cadurcotherium, palaeothere Plagiolophus, and all Paleogene European nimravids, the latter of which are suggested to have gone extinct by 28 Ma. These faunal changes brought an end to the dominance of feliforms in Europe in favor of caniforms (amphicyonids and ursids), the complete extinction of the palaeotheres, and the extirpations of the entelodonts and amynodonts from Europe, potentially correlating with increased aridity in Europe.

The later Late Oligocene records both M. cf. sarelense from the MP26 locality of Puycelci (sharing the same occurrence with M. mirabile) and M. sarelense from the MP27 site of Sarèle. Stratigraphically, this makes M. sarelense the temporally latest representative of the Dichobuninae, and by extent the Dichobunidae. Other mammals recorded in Sarèle include the eomyid Eomys, dipodid Plesiosminthus, cricetids Eucricetodon and Heterocricetodon, theridomyid Issiodoromys, amphicyonid Cynelos, tapirid Protapirus, anthracothere Elomeryx, and the cainothere Caenomeryx.
