= Progenitohyus =

Progenitohyus Temporal range: Eocene

Scientific classification
- Kingdom: Animalia
- Phylum: Chordata
- Class: Mammalia
- Order: Artiodactyla
- Family: †Dichobunidae
- Genus: †Progenitohyus; Ducrocq, Chaimanee, Suteethorn & Jaeger, 1997

Species
- P. thailandicus

Extinct genus of mammals

Progenitohyus is a fossil artiodactyl from the Eocene of Bang Pu Dam Coal Pit in Thailand. It was originally assigned to the family Helohyidae, but was reassigned to Dichobunidae in 2019.
