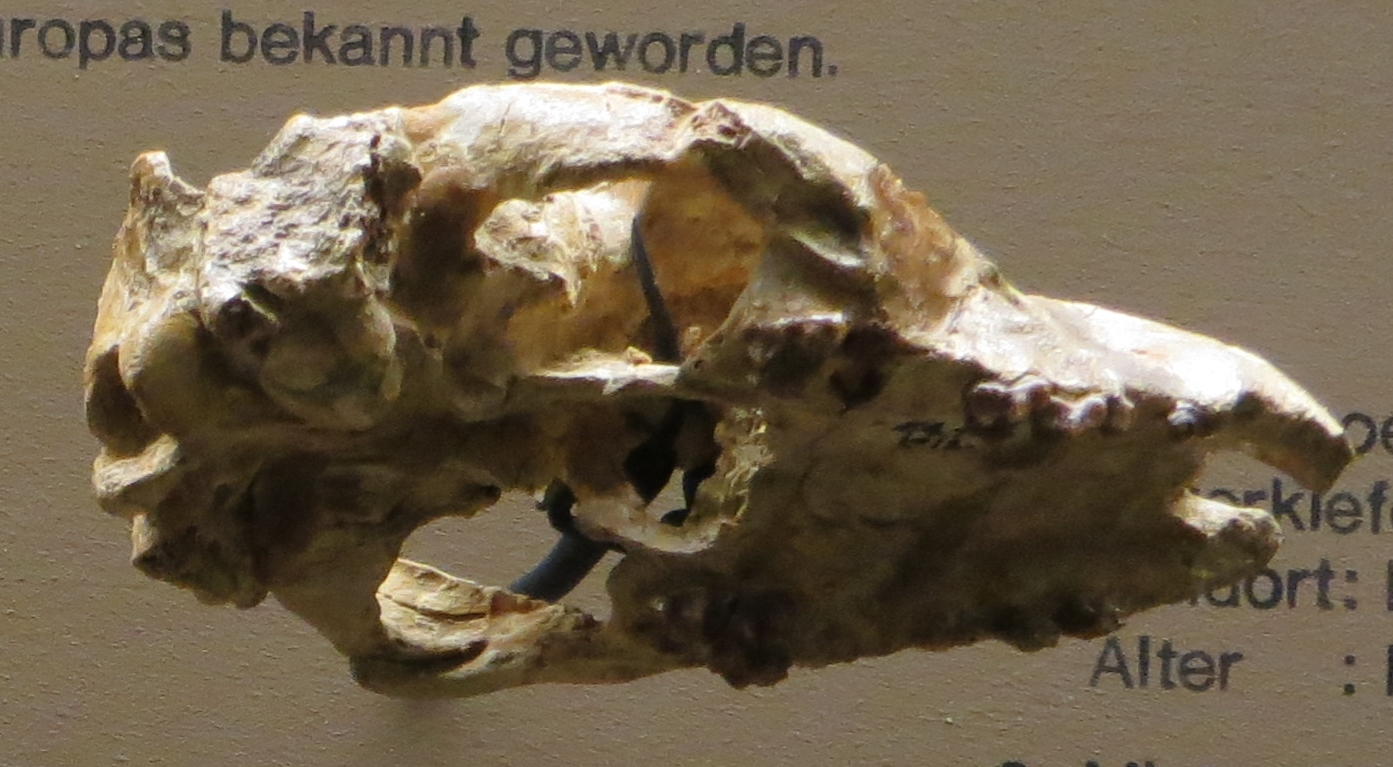
- Mixtotherium priscum cranium, Natural History Museum of Basel

Scientific classification
- Kingdom: Animalia
- Phylum: Chordata
- Class: Mammalia
- Order: Artiodactyla
- Family: †Mixtotheriidae; Pearson, 1927
- Genus: †Mixtotherium; Filhol, 1880

Type species
- †Mixtotherium cuspidatum Filhol, 1880

Other species
- †M. depressum Filhol, 1883; †M. quercyi Filhol, 1888; †M. gresslyi Rütimeyer, 1891; †M. priscum? Stehlin, 1908; †M. leenhardti Stehlin, 1908; †M. infans Stehlin, 1910

Synonyms
- Genus synonymy: Myxtotherium Filhol, 1882; Adrotherium Filhol, 1883; Uphelognatos Filhol, 1888; Adiotherium Earle, 1896; Synonyms of M. depressum: Adrotherium depressum Filhol, 1883; Synonyms of M. quercyi: Uphelognatos quercyi Filhol, 1888

= Mixtotherium =

Mixtotherium Temporal range: Middle – Late Eocene45–37 Ma

Extinct genus of endemic Palaeogene European artiodactyls

Mixtotherium (Latin: mixtus (mixed) + Ancient Greek: θήρ (beast or wild animal) meaning "mixed beast") is an extinct genus of Palaeogene artiodactyls belonging to the monotypic family Mixtotheriidae. Known informally as mixtotheriids or mixtotheres, these artiodactyls were endemic to western Europe and occurred from the middle to late Eocene. The genus and type species were both first established by the French naturalist Henri Filhol in 1880. Several species are well known by good skull fossils, which were informative enough to allow for classifications of the species to their own family. The Mixtotheriidae, first recognized by Helga Sharpe Pearson in 1927, is currently known by 7 valid species, although M. priscum is thought by several authors to be synonymous with M. gresslyi. The affinities of the Mixtotheriidae in relation to other artiodactyl families is uncertain, but it is currently thought to have been related to the Cainotherioidea and Anoplotheriidae.

Mixtotherium had various unusual skull morphologies that no other contemporary Palaeogene artiodactyl shared. In instances of convergent evolution, mixtotheriids shared with adapid primates large sagittal crests (ridges on the top of the skull), wide zygomatic arches (cheek bones), short but wide snouts, and enlarged orbits (eye sockets) that are situated toward the center of the skull's face. It is also thought to have shared with hyraxes proportionally wide mandibles in the horizontal area, likely supported by large muscles of mastication for chewing through food. It also had weak incisors, robust but premolariform canines, and low-crowned plus bunodont-selenodont upper molars. Comparatively, its postcranial skeleton is almost unknown because only two types of foot bone fossils are attributed to it, making its overall anatomy unknown. Mixtotherium varied in size from the earlier-appearing M. gresslyi with an estimated body mass of 2.8 kg (6.2 lb) to the latest mixtotheriid M. cuspidatum with an estimated weight of 11 kg (24 lb).

Mixtotherium is thought to have been purely folivorous or frugivorous plus folivorous. It may have been either a ground dweller or an arboreal locomotor like hyraxes and basal primates, but these behaviors are almost completely speculative due to the lack of complete postcranial material. The genus occurred exclusively in western Europe due to it being a mostly isolated archipelago during much of the Eocene, coexisting with a wide variety of other artiodactyls and perissodactyls in subtropical-tropical environments. The Mixtotheriidae probably went extinct by the Late Eocene, although why is unclear.

== Taxonomy ==
=== Early history ===
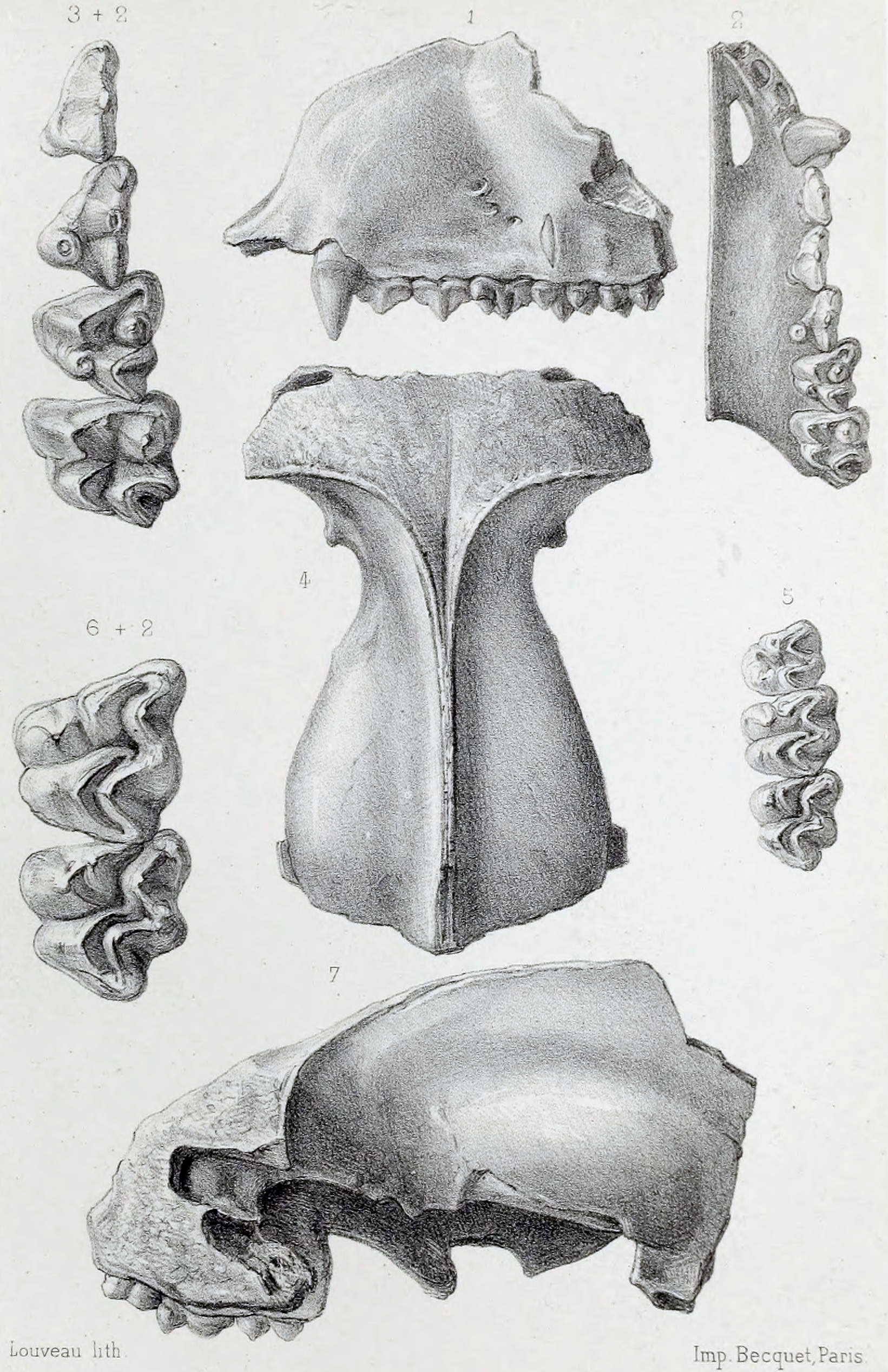
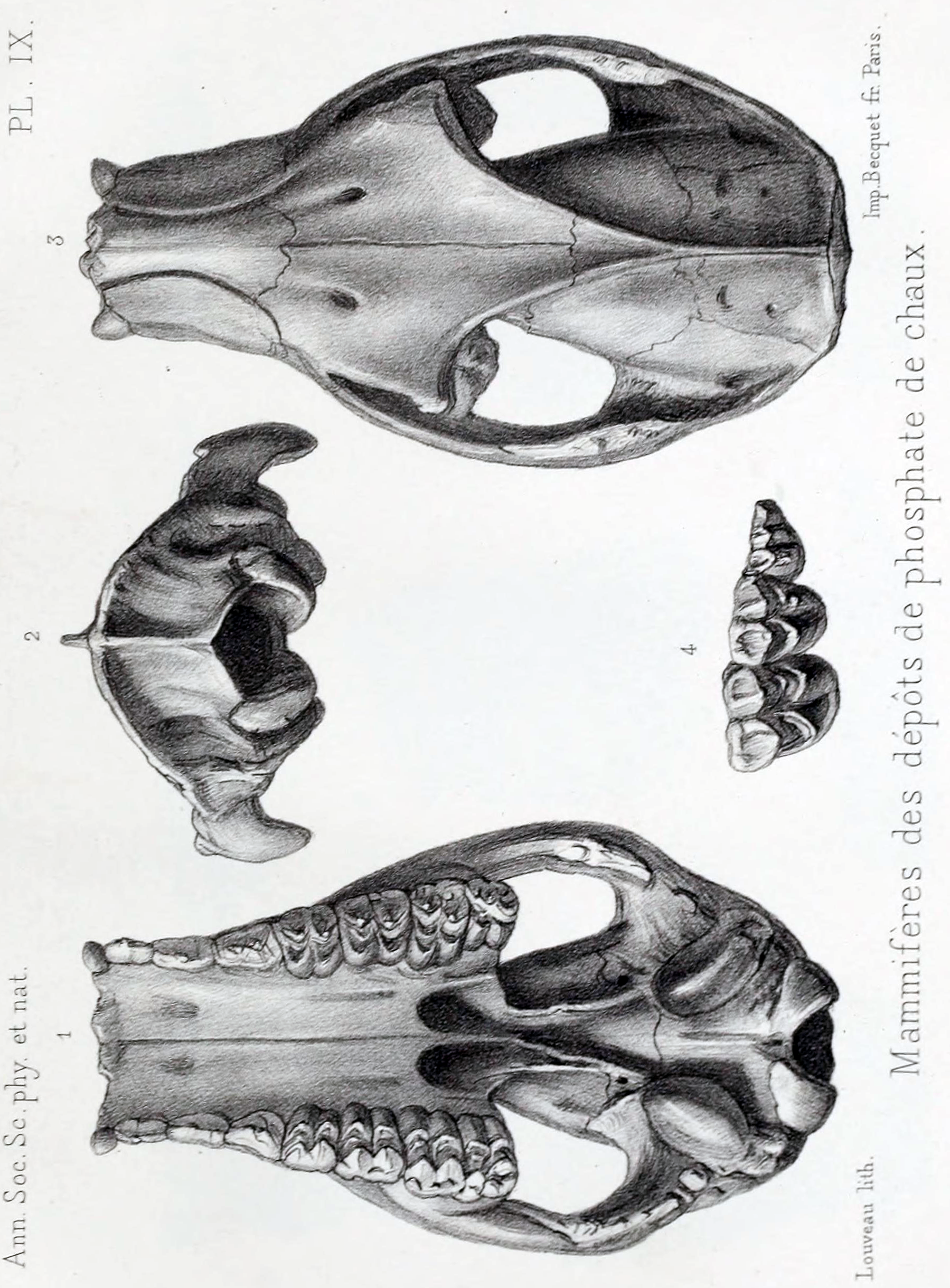
Skull material of Mixtotherium cuspidatum from 1882 (left) and "Adrotherium" (= Mixtotherium) depressum from 1884 (right)

In 1880, the French naturalist Henri Filhol described fossils from the deposits of the French commune of Caylus, Tarn-et-Garonne (formerly "Caylux"). For one species (the other species he described now belong to Metriotherium and Dacrytherium), he designated the binomial name Mixtotherium cuspidatum to a small "pachyderm" with a continuous series of teeth. The specimen had a strong upper canine and upper molars with five sharp points (three in the front area). He also noticed that it had a proportionally enormous sagittal crest. The genus name Mixtotherium derives from both Latin for mixtus (mixed) and Ancient Greek for θήρ (beast or wild animal), meaning "mixed beast".

Filhol described another species from the phosphorite deposits of Quercy in 1883 based on a skull cast that palaeontologist Jean Albert Gaudry gave to him. According to Filhol, the upper incisors were missing and the strong canines stuck out beyond the premolars similar to Mixtotherium. The naturalist stated the premolars were similar to those of Mixtotherium but that it had specific dental differences from it. As a result, he designated another binomial name Adrotherium depressum. Adrotherium derives from the Ancient Greek words αδρος ("stout" or "large") plus θήρ meaning "stout beast".

Henri Filhol provided more detailed descriptions of M. cuspidatum in 1882, confirming he made the genus name Mixtotherium known in 1880. He also provided an image for the skull of the species. Likewise, he reaffirmed the validity of A. depressum in 1884, reproducing an image of the skull cast that he previously described.

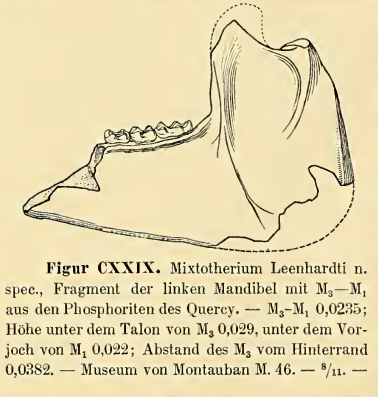
Sketch of the mandible of M. leenhardti with an M_{1}-M_{3} dental series, 1908

In 1888, Filhol described another species from the Quercy lime deposits based on a partial mandible with the 4th premolar and the 3 molars, observing that the dentition was peculiar. He concluded that it must have had affinities with anoplotheriids like Anoplotherium and Diplobune based on dentition and gave another binomial name Uphelognatos quercyi.

In 1891, Swiss palaeontologist Ludwig Rütimeyer erected the species M. gresslyi based on some upper jaw fossils from the Swiss municipality of Egerkingen that were previously classified as "Hyopotamus (= Bothriodon) gresslyi". He recognized that the species name would have drawn attention to the taxonomic confusion resulting from another taxon "H. gresslyi", which in 1908 was synonymized with Haplobunodon lydekkeri by the Swiss palaeontologist Hans Georg Stehlin.

The same year that Rütimeyer erected M. gresslyi, German palaeontologist Karl Alfred von Zittel synonymized Mixtotherium with Diplobune and Adrotherium with Dacrytherium, synonymizing A. depressum with D. cayluxense (= D. ovinum). He did not indicate the status of the species M. cuspidatum. In 1896, palaeontologist Charles Earle objected to von Zittel's synonymy of Mixtotherium with Diplobune, considering it to be a valid genus entirely distinct from both Diplobune and Anoplotherium. He also disagreed with von Zittel's synonymy of Adrotherium with Dacrytherium, suggesting that the genus was instead based on the milk teeth of Mixtotherium. He considered that mixtotheres were intermediate between cebochoerids and anoplotheriids and arose from a common ancestral group of it and merycoidodonts.

Stehlin synonymized both Uphelnognatos and Adrotherium with the revalidated Mixtotherium in 1908, transferring both individual species of the junior synonyms to the senior synonym as M. queryci and M. depressum. He erected two additional species of mixtotheriids. The first was M. priscum from Egerkingen, which he stated was somewhat larger than M. gresslyi. The second was M. Leenhardti from the Quercy phosphorites deposits. In 1910, he erected M. infans from other fossils from Egerkingen, stating that it was a small-sized species.

In 1913, German palaeontologist Martin Schmidt erected the species M. mezi from the Jebel Qatrani Formation of Egypt, making it the first species classified as Mixtotherium from outside Europe. The species was eventually synonymized with Bothriogenys sp. by Patricia A. Holroyd et al. in 2010.

During 1927, British palaeontologist Helga Sharpe Pearson established the family Mixtotheriidae of which Mixtotherium is the only member. Pearson argued that the genus does not form a natural group, or a clade indicating close evolutionary relations, with Cebochoerus or the Anthracotheriidae, although they do possess similar anatomical traits. In 1945, American palaeontologist George Gaylord Simpson demoted the Mixtotheriidae to subfamily rank within the Cebochoeridae as Mixtotheriinae, for which the other listed subfamily was Cebochoerinae.

=== Later taxonomic interpretations ===
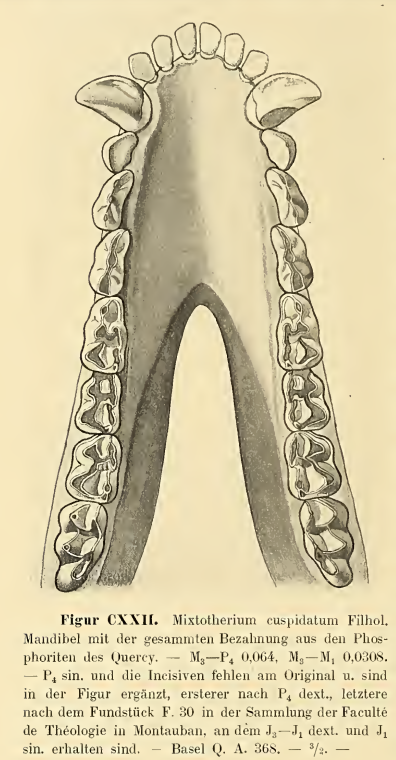
Mandible of M. cuspidatum with a reconstructed complete dental set, 1908

British palaeontologist Jerry J. Hooker in 1986 recognized the validity of the Mixtotheriidae, with Mixtotherium as the only genus classified in the family. He stated that M. cuspidatum was the type species and that the other species included are M. depressum, M. gresslyi, M. quercyi, M. leenhardti, and M. infans as valid species. Hooker also synonymized M. priscum with M. gresslyi on the basis that the two species were difficult to separate from each other. However, he also argued that only M. cuspidatum, M. gresslyi, and M. infans were well-characterized whereas M. quercyi and M. depressum very closely resemble M. cuspidatum. Hooker recognized the possibility of subspecies for Mixtotherium based on Egerkingen material. He stated that a complete revision of the genus would be ideal. Palaeontologists Jean Sudre and Léonard Ginsburg in 1993 supported retaining the Mixtotheriidae as a family but argued for the distinctions of both M. gresslyi and M. priscum, pointing out that the mixtothere species of different localities had significant variations in size.

In 2000, Hooker and Marc Weidmann referenced the 1986 synonymization of M. priscum with M. gresslyi, hence not listing the former as a valid species. They also transferred the species Robiacina lavergnensis, previously erected by Sudre in 1977, to Mixtotherium as M. lavergnense. They also synonymized R. weidmanni, previously named by Sudre in 1978, with M. lavergnense. Damien Becker et al. in 2013 adopted the reclassification of M. lavergnense, but in 2020, Romain Weppe et al. chose to retain in Robiacina the species R. lavergnensis, going contrary to the previous reclassification by Hooker and Weidmann. In 2021, Maëva Judith Orliac et al. suggested based on previous sources that M. priscum was probably synonymous with M. gresslyi and that R. lavergnensis is to be retained within Robiacina.

=== Classification ===
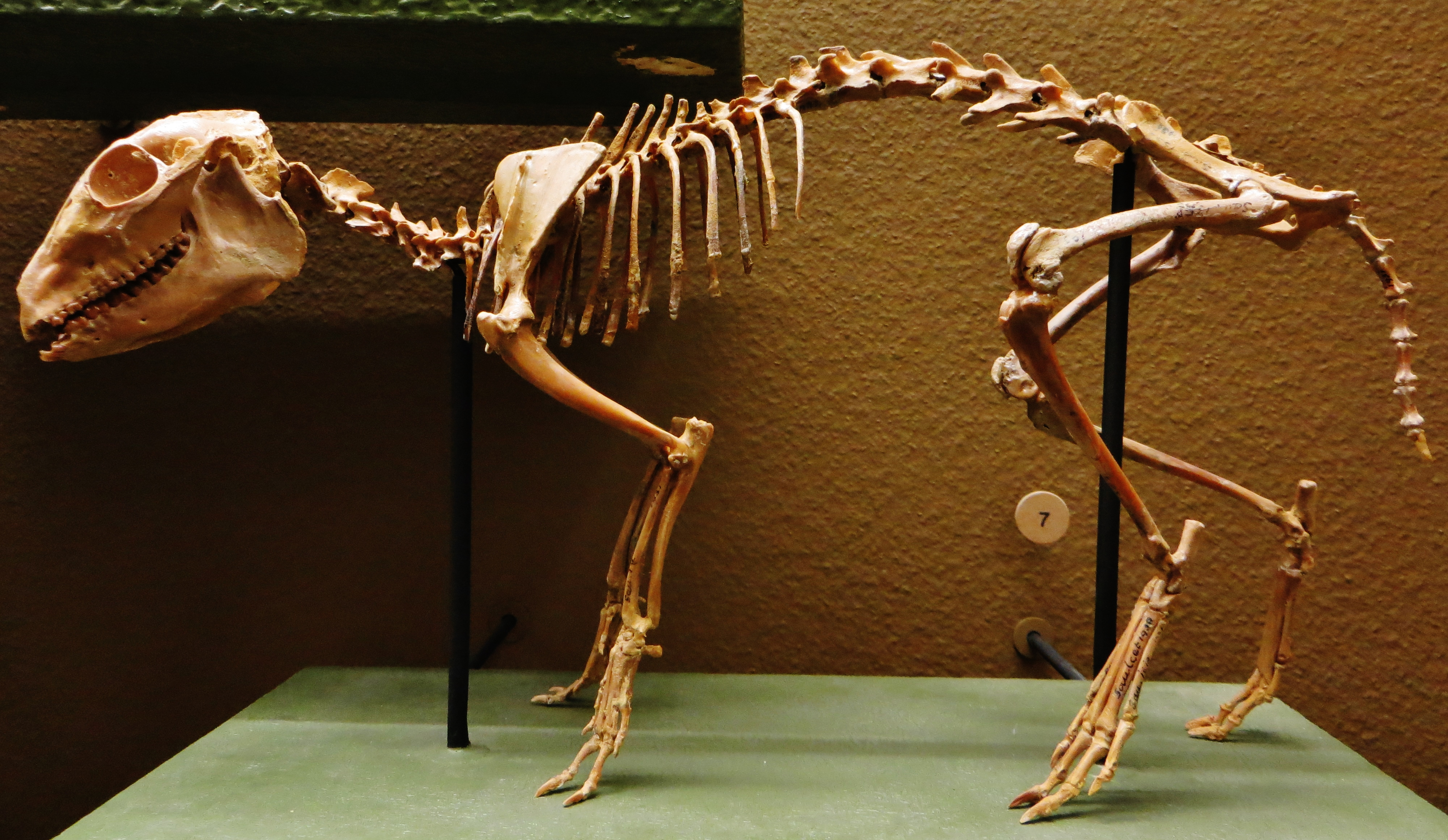
The Mixtotheriidae is thought to be closely related to the Cainotheriidae, including Cainotherium (skeleton at Natural History Museum of Basel)

Mixtotherium is the type and only genus of the artiodactyl family Mixtotheriidae. The genus was endemic to western Europe and lived from the Middle to Late Eocene (~44.9 to 37 Ma). Originally, it was classified as a member of the superfamily Cainotherioidea with the Cainotheriidae by Hooker and Weidmann in 2000. Since 2020, however, the Mixtotheriidae is no longer classified within the superfamily, although it is considered to be a sister group to it. Mixtotheres made their first appearance within western Europe by MP13 of the Mammal Palaeogene Zones along with several other artiodactyl families and ranged up to MP17b based on fossil localities. The evolutionary origin of the Mixtotheriidae is unknown as its sudden appearance by MP13 could not be linked to any prior taxon.

The phylogenetic relations of the Mixtotheriidae as well as the Anoplotheriidae, Xiphodontidae and Cainotheriidae have been elusive due to the selenodont morphologies (or having crescent-shaped ridges) of the molars, which were convergent with tylopods or ruminants. Some researchers considered the selenodont families Anoplotheriidae, Xiphodontidae, and Cainotheriidae to be within Tylopoda due to postcranial features that were similar to the tylopods from North America in the Palaeogene. Other researchers consider them more closely related to ruminants than tylopods based on dental morphology. Different phylogenetic analyses have produced different results for the "derived" (or of new evolutionary traits) selenodont Eocene European artiodactyl families, making it uncertain whether they were closer to the Tylopoda or Ruminantia.

In an article published in 2019, Romain Weppe et al. conducted a phylogenetic analysis of the Cainotherioidea within the Artiodactyla based on mandibular and dental characteristics, specifically in terms of relationships with artiodactyls of the Palaeogene. The results retrieved that the superfamily was closely related to the Mixtotheriidae and Anoplotheriidae. They determined that the Cainotheriidae, Robiacinidae, Anoplotheriidae, and Mixtotheriidae formed a clade that was the sister group to the Ruminantia while Tylopoda, along with the Amphimerycidae and Xiphodontidae split earlier in the tree. The phylogenetic tree published in the article and another work about the cainotherioids is outlined below:

- - Eurodexis russelli
  - Dichobune leporina
  - - - Amphimeryx murinus
      - - Xiphodon castrense
        - Tylopoda
          - Paratoceras coatesi
          - Eotylopus reedi
    - - Ruminantia
        - Parvitragulus priscus
        - - Lophiomeryx chalaniati
          - Archaeomeryx optatus
      - - Mixtotheriidae
          Mixtotherium cuspidatum
        - Anoplotheriidae
          - Anoplotherium latipes
          - Dacrytherium ovinum
        - Cainotherioidea
          - Robiacinidae
            - Robiacina lavergnesis
            - - Robiacina minuta
              - Robiacina quercyi
          - Cainotheriidae
            - Palembertina deplasi
            - - Oxacroninae
                - Paroxacron bergeri
                - - Paroxacron valdense
                  - Oxacron courtoisii
              - Cainotheriinae
                - Cainotherium laticurvatum
                - - Caenomeryx
                    - Caenomeryx filholi
                    - Caenomeryx procommunis
                  - Plesiomeryx
                    - Plesiomeryx cadurcensis
                    - Plesiomeryx huerzeleri

In 2020, Vincent Luccisano et al. created a phylogenetic tree of the basal artiodactyls, a majority endemic to western Europe, from the Palaeogene. In one clade, the "bunoselenodont endemic European" Mixtotheriidae, Anoplotheriidae, Xiphodontidae, Amphimerycidae, Cainotheriidae, and Robiacinidae are grouped together with the Ruminantia. The phylogenetic tree as produced by the authors is shown below:

- Artiodactyla
  - Bunophorus
  - - Gunophorus
    - Diacodexis
  - - - Protodichobune
      - Eurodexis
    - - - Buxobune
        - - Mouillacitherium
          - Meniscodon
        - - - Hyperdichobune
            - - Dichobune robertiana
              - - Dichobune leporina
                - - Homacodon
                  - - Gobiohyus
                    - Suina
                      - - Khirtharia
                        - Entelodon
                      - - Palaeocheorus
                        - Perchoerus
          - - Haplobunodontidae
              - Haplobunodon
              - - Cuisitherium
                - Lophiobunodon
            - - Mixtotherium
              - - Robiacina
                - - - - Dacrytherium
                      - Diplobune
                    - - Xiphodon
                      - Paraxiphodon
                  - - - Cainotherium
                      - Paroxacron
                    - - Archaeomeryx
                      - - Amphimeryx
                        - Pseudamphimeryx
      - - Aumelasia
        - - - Hallebune
            - Amphirhagatherium
          - - Cebochoeridae
              - Cebochoerus
              - Gervachoerus
            - - Choeropotamus
              - Siamotherium

In 2022, Weppe conducted a phylogenetic analysis in his academic thesis regarding Palaeogene artiodactyl lineages, focusing most specifically on the endemic European families. He found that the Anoplotheriidae, Mixtotheriidae, and Cainotherioidea form a clade based on synapomorphic dental traits (traits thought to have originated from their most recent common ancestor). The result, Weppe mentioned, matches up with previous phylogenetic analyses on the Cainotherioidea with other endemic European Palaeogene artiodactyls that support the families as a clade. He determined that the Mixtotheriidae forms a clade with the Cainotherioidea based on close anatomical traits, therefore contradicting previous results supporting the Cainotherioidea being more closely related to the Anoplotheriidae than the Mixtotheriidae.

== Description ==
=== Skull ===
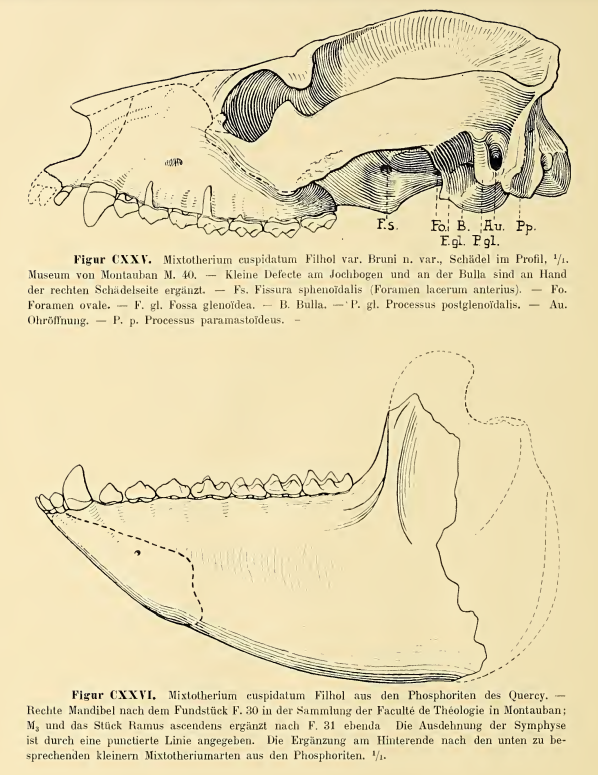
Drawing of a cranium and incomplete mandible of M. cuspidatum by Hans Georg Stehlin, 1908. Colette Dechaseaux used the drawings and redrew the outlines of the incomplete mandible portions to resemble those of hyraxes in 1974.

Mixtotherium is characterized by a low skull roof with a prominent sagittal crest that extends toward the back of the occipital ridge at the skull's back. The front side's frontal bones of the Mixtotheriidae are enlarged. The orbits for the eyes are enlarged and directed forwards to the skull's face, while the postorbital bar did not connect. The mastoid part of the temporal bone between the side portions of the occipital bone (exoccipitals) and the squamosal bone of the skull's back is not exposed. The tympanic part of the temporal bone (an inner bone of the ear) is proportionally small and moderately compressed between the center of the mandibular fossa (a fissure in the tympanic bone) of the temporal bone and a thick tympanic process. The snout (or muzzle) is short and wide. The zygomatic arches are also wide. These traits are also generally observed in large adapine primates like Leptadapis and Magnadapis in an instance of convergent evolution.

Similar to anthracotheres, the lengthy ear canal and the tympanic bone's neck that covers it in the skull of Mixtotherium are compressed by the postglenoid and post-tympanic processes (or projections) of the squamosal bone. The tympanic region of mixtotheres is less specialized than those of anthracotheres, with a less extreme compression and lengthening of the tympanic neck, no sideway shift of the glenoid (or shallow) surface, and a short ear canal. The skull of Mixtotherium can superficially resemble that of Cebochoerus due to the low skull as well as the compositions of the parietal bone and jugal bone at the skull's front as well as the occipital bone at the back. The mixtothere differs from the cebochoerid by having a swollen as opposed to flattened tympanic bone.

The horizontal back portion of the mandible, or the mandibular corpus, is noticeably large, reminiscent of those of hyracoids including extant hyraxes. The horizontal ramus of M. leenhardti is slightly deeper compared to other species, but it could have been the result of an individual's old age. Mandibular fossil evidence is incomplete, leading to the outline not being completely known. Palaeoneurologist Colette Dechaseaux used the drawings of the skull and mandible of M. cuspidatum by Stehlin to adjust them to appear articulated with each other. She reconstructed the mandibular condyle and coronoid process of the mandible, both back portions of the mandible, of Mixtotherium as being similar to hyraxes. Under these conditions, she said, the mandible would have fit perfectly with the skull, the upper and lower teeth being properly in occlusion (full contact) with each other.

=== Endocast anatomy ===
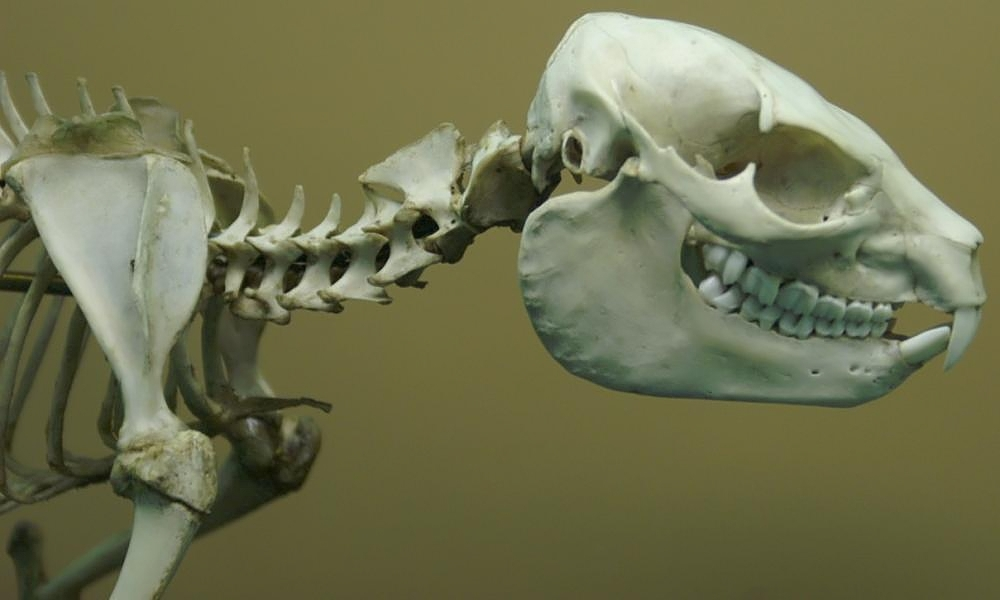
Rock hyrax (Procavia capensis) skull, National Museum of Natural History. The mandibular rami of hyraxes are wide similar to those of Mixtotherium.

M. cuspidatum is known by a plaster brain endocast which was described first by Dechaseaux in 1973 and is today held by the Victor Brun Natural History Museum. The original virtual plaster model as studied by Oliac et al. in 2021 has a volume of 16,500 mm (650 in)^{3} while the second and more complete model with filled missing volumes measures 19,503 mm (767.8 in)^{3}, which they noted was still an underestimation. The olfactory bulbs measure 2,145 mm (84.4 in)^{3}, filling in 13% of the original endocast volume. According to Dechaseaux, the endocast of Mixtotherium differs from other contemporary artiodactyls such as the dichobunids, amphimerycids, cebochoerids, and cainotheres in the elongated brain resulting in pointed olfactory peduncles and olfactory bulbs. The olfactory bulbs are proportionally large and slightly straight although not to the upper surface of the neocortex. In a newer and more complete endocast model, half of the olfactory bulbs meet with each other then diverge. The cribriform plate is located in the frontmost area of the olfactory bulb chamber with a small underside expansion. The bulbs are separated from the cerebrum of the brain by a short and circular fissure.

Dechaseaux noticed that there is a deep and wide space between the neocortex and the cerebellar vermis, therefore revealing an exposed and lowered midbrain, which she considered "remarkable". The maximum height of the forebrain is little more than half its length. Unlike other endemic European artiodactyl endocasts she studied, the cerebrum has a low height but is at a much higher position than the neocortex. Three furrows can be observed on the neocortex: a rectilinear suprasylvia that extends over the back region of the cerebral hemisphere up to the middle of the olfactory part of the brain, a narrow gyrus between the olfactory region and the suprasylvia, and another furrow that is not entirely visible. The suprasylvia fissure is located on the right cerebral hemisphere and appears parallel to the sagittal axis of the endocast. The neocortex itself does not cover the olfactory bulbs or the cerebellum. The frontal lobe is narrow while the temporal lobe is enlarged. The cerebellar vermis is enlarged and rounded, its area in front of the primary fissure of the cerebellum being wider and more swollen. The cerebellar hemispheres are small and not extensive. The characteristics of the hemispheres and vermis led Dechaseaux to conclude that the paleocerebellum was more developed than the neocerebellum.

In Mixtotherium, the positions of the furrows and the circular vermis that protrudes back are similar to what is observed in Diplobune. These traits are derived compared to various other basal artiodactyls with known endocasts and support the close affinities of the Mixtotheriidae and Anoplotheriidae. It differs from Diacodexis and Dichobune by the more square-shaped outlines and divergence of the olfactory bulbs chambers. Similar to the Raoellidae, the location of the brain lies in the back area relative to the orbits, the cerebrum being in the back position to the postorbital process. The brain's location may have to do with the wide zygomatic arches and large sagittal crest, which are evident for large muscles of mastication for grinding food.

=== Dentition ===
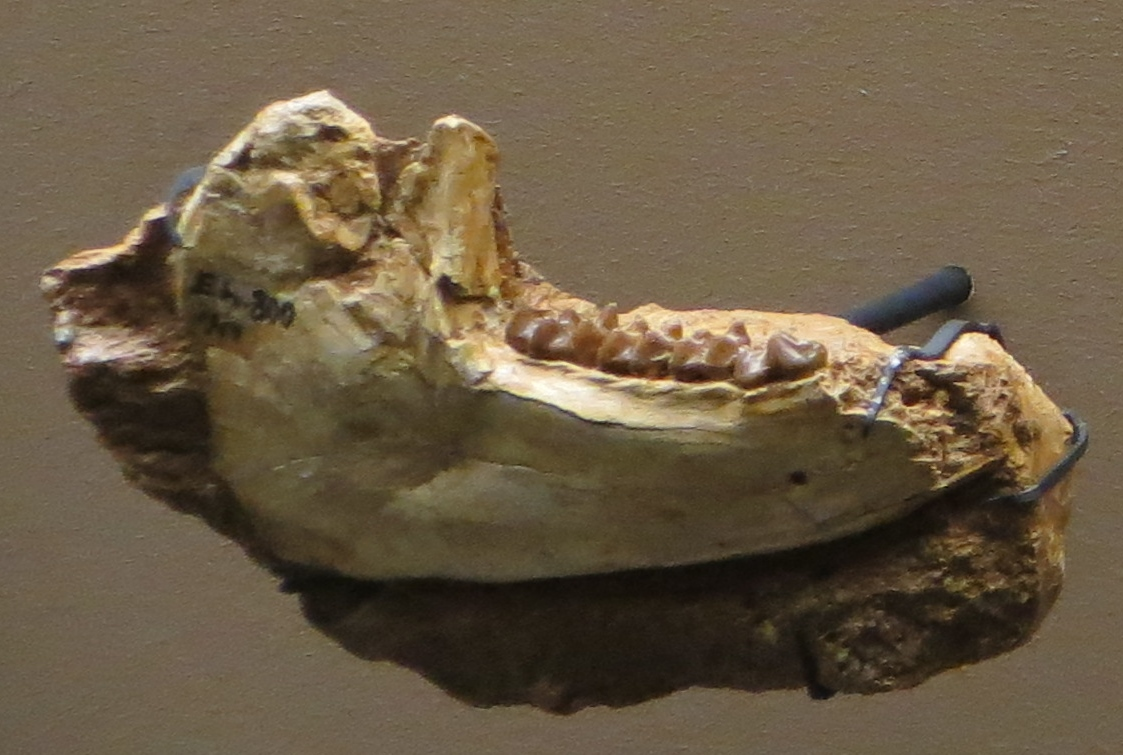
M. priscum mandible, Natural History Museum of Basel

Mixtotherium has a complete set of 3 three incisors, 1 canine, 4 premolars, and 3 molars on each half of the upper and lower jaws, consistent with the primitive placental mammal dental formula of 3.1.4.33.1.4.3 for a total of 44 teeth. The incisors are formatted in a semicircular arc and are separated from each other by small diastemata, or gaps between teeth. The thickness level decreases slightly from the third incisors to the first incisors. The incisors overall are weak, and the I^{3} and canine are separated by a small diastema. The canines are prominent, robust, and have a slightly premolariform shape. P^{1} is narrow and adjacent to the upper canine. P_{1} is seemingly separated from the lower canine by a small diastema as well. P^{2} and P^{3} have well-developed lingual cusps while P_{2} and P_{3} are elongated and have 3 cusps aligned with each other. P^{4} is triangular in outline and molariform in shape but lacks the paraconule cusp.

The upper molars are both brachyodont (low-crowned) and bunoselodont, or bunodont (having rounded cusps) and selenodont, in form. They also appear roughly triangular or roughly trapezoidal in outline at an upper view of the teeth. Their conical paraconule cusps are reduced and are part of the preprotocrista crest (an enamel ridge). The protoconule cusps are weak, and the parastyle cusps and mesostyle cusps appear labially round. M_{1}–M_{2} usually exhibit back-sided cingulids (or lower tooth ridges) that are round lingually and extend to the back of the entoconid cusp. The transverse third lobe of the M_{3} is compressed.

=== Postcranial skeleton ===
In terms of postcranial anatomy, mixtotheriids are known only from astragali and a calcaneus, both foot bones forming the tarsus, from the locality of La Défense in France, otherwise having no other documented postcranial bone. Sudre and Ginsburg listed the postcranial remains as belonging to M. cf. gresslyi (cf. meaning uncertain species identification) because of the common appearance of the species in the locality. Based on one astragalus, the front trochlea (or pulley) is asymmetrical with a high elevation of the inner lip compared to the back trochlea. The astragali characteristics of Mixtotherium appear in all other contemporary primitive artiodactyls with the exception of Dacrytherium, which as an anoplotheriid has specialized morphologies. A calcaneum that may possibly belong to Mixtotherium was described as having a massive beak with a sloping navicular facet.

=== Body mass ===
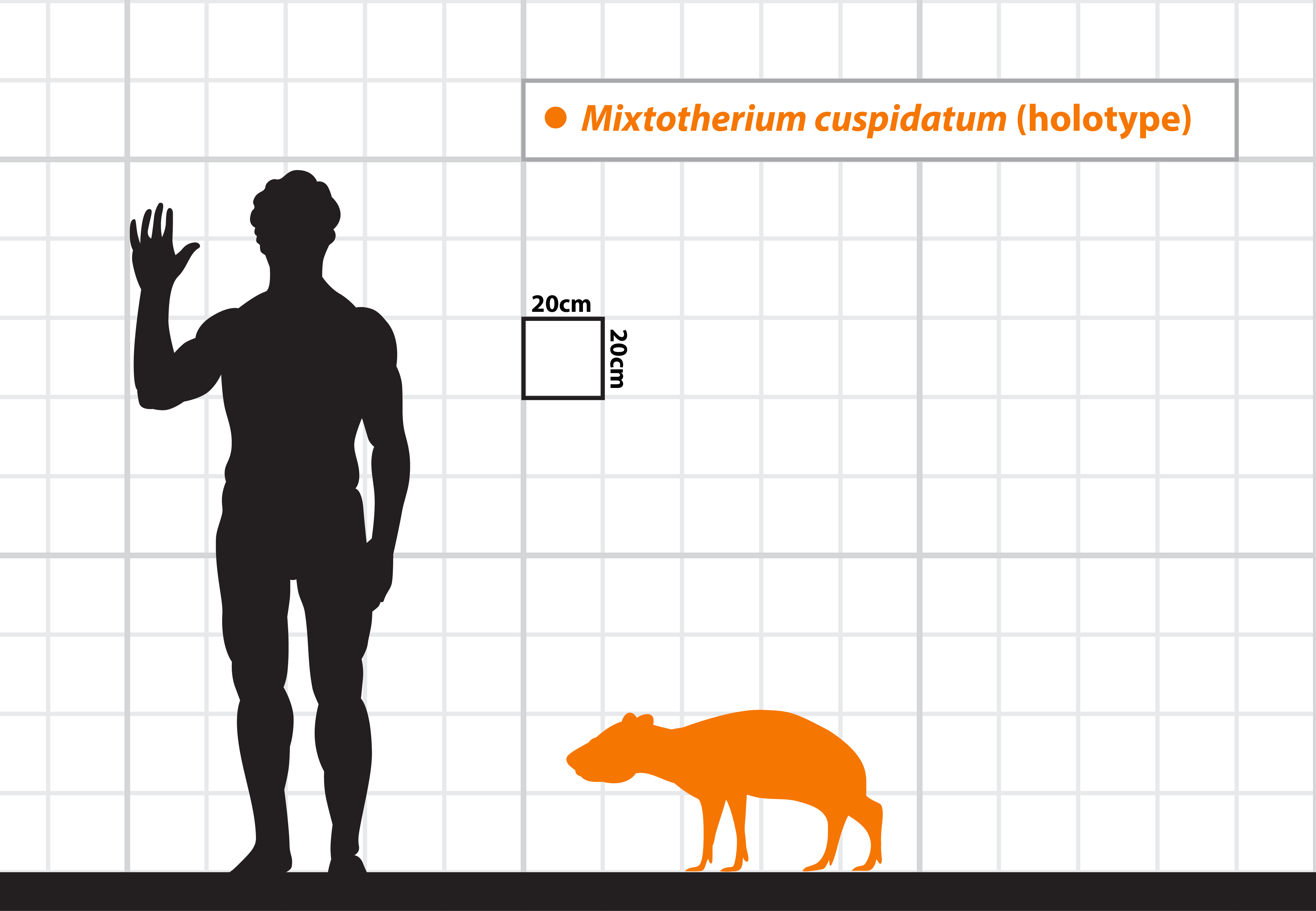
Estimated size comparison of M. cuspidatum with a speculated body build

Helder Gomes Rodrigues et al. estimated the body mass of M. cf. gresslyi on astragali from La Défense, yielding the result of 3 kg (6.6 lb). The body mass formula based on astragali was previously established by Jean-Noël Martinez and Sudre in 1995 for Palaeogene artiodactyls, although Mixtotherium was not included in the initial study. The body mass of two mixtotheriid species have been estimated by Orliac et al. in 2021 based on a formula using dental measurements. They stated that the mixtotheriids ranged from 2.8 kg (6.2 lb) in the case of M. gresslyi to 11 kg (24 lb) regarding M. cuspidatum. They did not offer body mass estimates for other valid species of mixtotheres.

According to Hooker in 1986, M. gresslyi is a medium-sized species; it is smaller than M. cuspidatum but larger than M. infans. Sudre et al. in 1990 stated that M. priscum was smaller than both M. leenhardti and M. cuspidatum, the latter of which they said was much larger. They also reported that M. cf. gresslyi from Quercy deposits was smaller than the Laprade fauna (MP14) species M. priscum. Sudre and Ginsburg in 1993 argued that M. gresslyi as known from Lissieu is smaller than M. priscum from the Laprade fauna.

== Palaeobiology ==
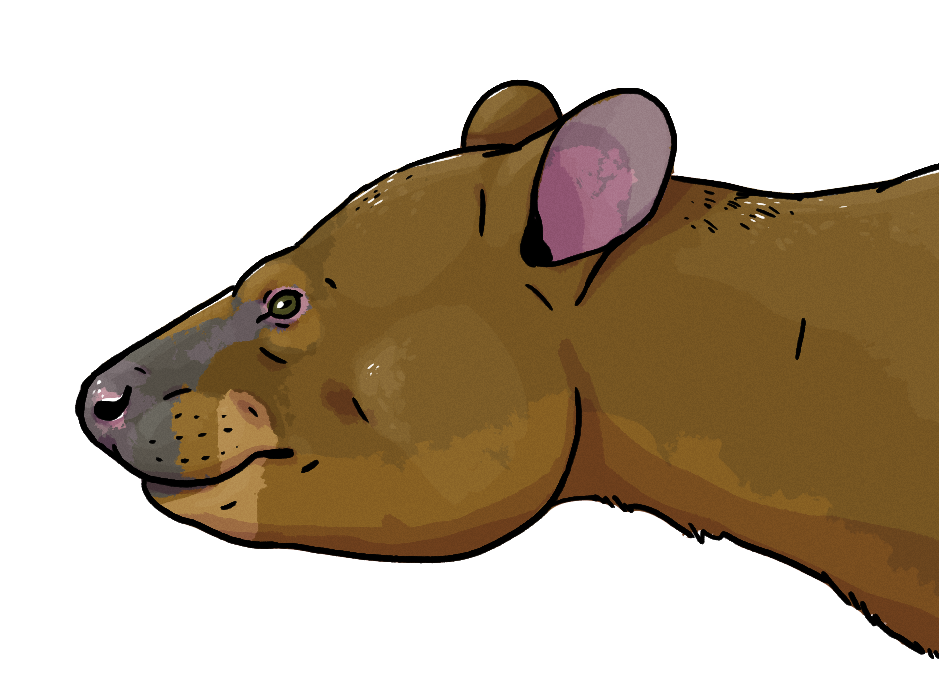
Reconstruction of the head of M. cuspidatum

The Mixtotheriidae is one of the bunoselenodont family artiodactyl groups within western Europe. As a result, it is thought to have had mixed frugivorous-folivorous diets. According to Sudre in 1972, the different dental morphologies of mixtothere species may suggest different ecological habits. He stated that M. priscum has bunodont molars reminiscent of Dacrytherium while M. gresslyi has more selenodont molars and therefore may have had different diets from M. priscum. Hooker in 1986 inferred that because of the dental similarities of Mixtotherium to Dacrytherium, they both therefore may have had folivorous diets similar to indriid lemurs.

The postcranial morphology of Mixtotherium is poorly known because of the overall lack of evidence. On the other hand, it is thought to have shared similar palaeobiologies with hyracoids. One hypothesis was that despite the similar dental morphologies to indriid lemurs, mixtotheriids may have simply been ground-dwelling folivores. Notably, mixtotheriids share similar cranial morphologies with two different arboreal mammal groups, namely the extinct adapine primates and the extant hyraxes. Because of its facial convergence with adapines and mandibular similarities with hyraxes, Weppe in his 2022 thesis speculated that it may have possibly had arboreal habits similar to the other mammal groups.

== Palaeoecology ==
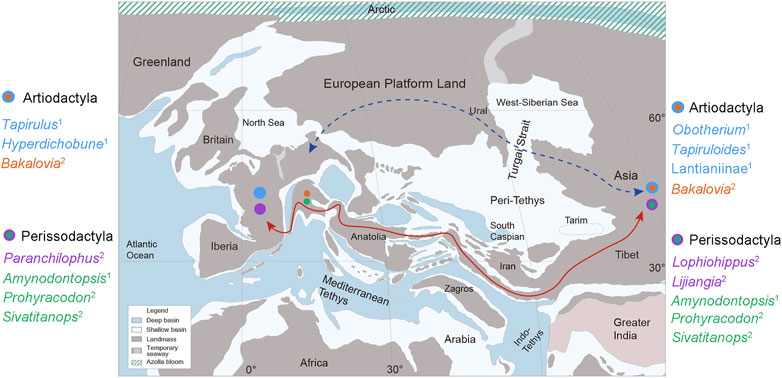
Palaeogeography of Europe and Asia during the Middle Eocene with possible artiodactyl and perissodactyl dispersal routes.

For much of the Eocene, a hothouse climate with humid, tropical environments with consistently high precipitations prevailed. Modern mammalian orders including the Perissodactyla, Artiodactyla, and Primates (or the suborder Euprimates) appeared already by the Early Eocene, diversifying rapidly and developing dentitions specialized for folivory. The omnivorous forms mostly either switched to folivorous diets or went extinct by the Middle Eocene (47–37 Ma) along with the archaic "condylarths". By the Late Eocene (approx. 37–33 Ma), most of the ungulate form dentitions shifted from bunodont cusps to cutting ridges (i.e. lophs) for folivorous diets.

Land-based connections to the north of the developing Atlantic Ocean were interrupted around 53 Ma, meaning that North America and Greenland were no longer well-connected to western Europe. From the Early Eocene up until the Grande Coupure extinction event (56 Ma - 33.9 Ma), the western Eurasian continent was separated into three landmasses, the former two of which were isolated by seaways: western Europe (an archipelago), Balkanatolia, and eastern Eurasia (Balkanatolia was in between the Paratethys Sea of the north and the Neotethys Ocean of the south). The Holarctic mammalian faunas of western Europe were therefore mostly isolated from other continents including Greenland, Africa, and eastern Eurasia, allowing for endemism to occur within western Europe. The European mammals of the Late Eocene (MP17 - MP20 of the Mammal Palaeogene zones) were mostly descendants of endemic Middle Eocene groups as a result.

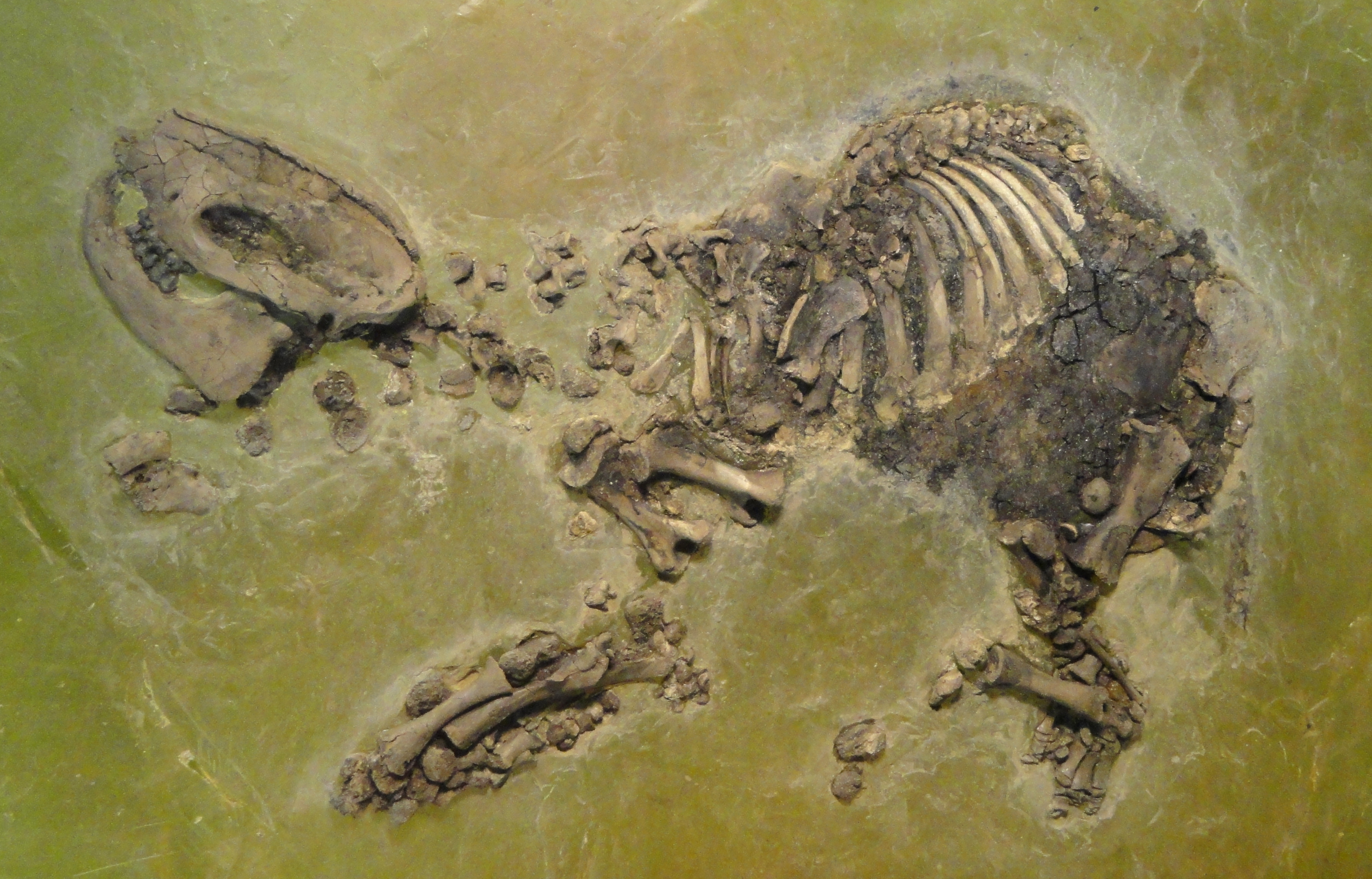
Lophiodon skeleton, Naturmuseum Senckenberg. Mixtotherium cooccurred with lophiodonts for a majority of its existence.

M. cf. gresslyi is the earliest-known representative of its genus in the western European fossil record within the MP13 French locality La Défense. By then, it would have coexisted with perissodactyls (Palaeotheriidae, Lophiodontidae, and Hyrachyidae), non-endemic artiodactyls (Dichobunidae and Tapirulidae), endemic European artiodactyls (Choeropotamidae (possibly polyphyletic, however), Cebochoeridae, and Anoplotheriidae), and primates (Adapidae). Both the Amphimerycidae and Xiphodontidae made their first appearances by the level MP14. The stratigraphic ranges of the early species of Mixtotherium also overlapped with metatherians (Herpetotheriidae), cimolestans (Pantolestidae, Paroxyclaenidae), rodents (Ischyromyidae, Theridomyoidea, Gliridae), eulipotyphlans, bats, apatotherians, carnivoraformes (Miacidae), and hyaenodonts (Hyainailourinae, Proviverrinae). Other MP13-MP14 sites have also yielded fossils of turtles and crocodylomorphs, and MP13 sites are stratigraphically the latest to have yielded remains of the bird clades Gastornithidae and Palaeognathae.

In addition to M. cf. gresslyi, other mammals that made appearances in La Défense include dichobunids (Dichobune, Meniscodon, and Hyperdichobune), cebochoerids Cebochoerus and Gervachoerus, and the lophiodont Lophiodon.

Not all mixtotheriid species are well-correlated with faunal ranges, as some like M. quercyi are not well-documented due to only being described from older fossil collections. M. priscum, M. gresslyi and M. infans are known exclusively from MP14 deposits, and a species described as M. cf. gresslyi from Creechbarrow Limestone is dated to MP16.

After MP16, a faunal turnover occurred, marking the disappearances of the lophiodonts and European hyrachyids as well as the extinctions of all European crocodylomorphs except for the alligatoroid Diplocynodon. The causes of the faunal turnover have been attributed to a shift from humid and highly tropical environments to drier and more temperate forests with open areas and more abrasive vegetation. The surviving herbivorous faunas shifted their dentitions and dietary strategies accordingly to adapt to abrasive and seasonal vegetation. The environments were still subhumid and full of subtropical evergreen forests, however. The Palaeotheriidae was the sole remaining European perissodactyl group, and frugivorous-folivorous or purely folivorous artiodactyls became the dominant group in western Europe.

The largest species M. cuspidatum is known only from MP17b localities like the French site of Perrière. In Perrière, its fossils were found with those of the herpetotheriids Peratherium and Amphiperatherium, pseudorhyncocyonid Pseudorhyncocyon, apatemyid Heterohyus, nyctitheriid Saturninia, various bats, rodents (Gliridae, Theridomyidae), omomyids Pseudoloris and Microchoerus, adapid Leptadapis, hyaenodontid Hyenodon, miacid Quercygale, palaeotheres (Lophiotherium, Palaeotherium, and Plagiolophis), dichobunid Mouillacitherium, cebochoerid Acotherulum, anoplotheriid Dacrytherium, tapirulid Tapirulus, xiphodonts Dichodon and Haplomeryx, and the amphimerycid Pseudamphimeryx.

Both the Mixtotheriidae and the Robiacinidae are monogeneric families that are last recorded by MP17b within western Europe, whereas many other European endemic families that had long coexisted with them persisted. The extinctions of the two families may be correlated with increasingly open and dry environments resulting from changes in climate and vegetation.
