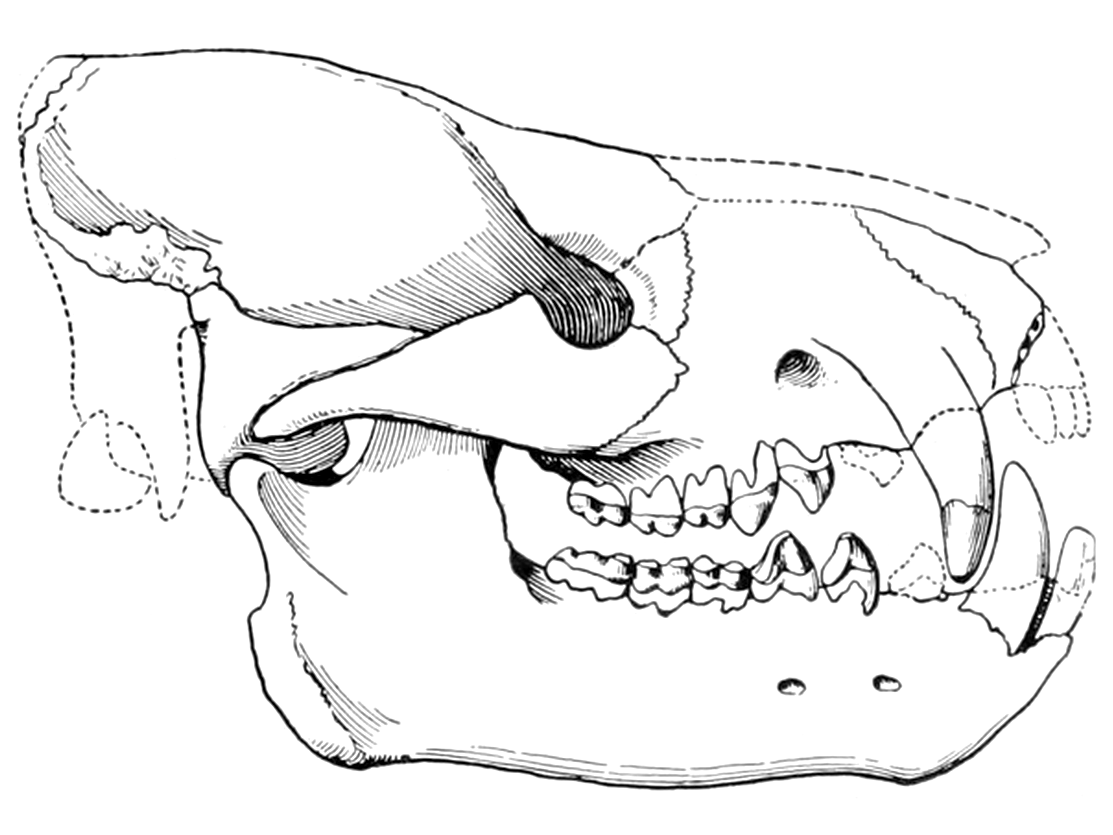
- Reconstruction of the skull of Achaenodon robustus

Scientific classification
- Kingdom: Animalia
- Phylum: Chordata
- Class: Mammalia
- Order: Artiodactyla
- Family: †Helohyidae
- Genus: †Achaenodon; Cope, 1873

Type species
- †Achaenodon insolens Cope, 1873

Other species
- A. robustus Osborn, 1883; A. uintense Osborn, 1895; A. fremdi Lucas et al. 2004

= Achaenodon =

Achaenodon Temporal range: Mid-to-Upper Eocene43–39 Ma

Extinct mammal

Achaenodon is an extinct artiodactyl mammal belonging to the family Helohyidae. It lived in the mid-late Eocene (about 43-39 million years ago) and its fossil remains have been found in North America.

== Description ==
Achaenodon was a large mammal around the size of a pig or a black bear, with a body mass of around 200–285 kilograms (441–628 lb). The skull had a relatively short muzzle and wide (laterally expanded) expanded zygomatic arches, making the skull nearly as wide as it was long. There was a very high sagittal crest, which connected later to an expanded nuchal crest; these two structures, together with the large cheekbone arches, indicate that the musculature of the jaws was extremely powerful. The teeth of Achenodon were bunodont and quite large in size. The dental formula was the primitive (ancestral) condition of artiodactyls with three incisors, a canine, four premolars and three molars; the first lower premolar was present in juveniles but were absent in adults. The upper molars had greatly thickened enamel. The limbs were short, with the forelimbs being slightly shorter than the hind limbs, with the manus having four digits.

== Classification ==
First described in 1873 by Edward Drinker Cope, Achaenodon is best known for fossil remains from the Wyoming Middle Eocene. The type species is Achaenodon insolens. Other species are known, from California, Oregon (A. fremdi), Utah (A. uintense), and Wyoming (A. robustus). Archaenodon has generally either been assigned to the family Helohyidae, or to its own family Achaenodontidae. Some studies have suggested that Achaenodon could be a basal representative of Cetancodontamorpha, and closely related to entelodonts. Older literature placed Achaenodon in Entelodontidae proper, though this is most likely not accurate.

== Ecology ==
Achaeonodon was probably an omnivore that consumed both vegetation as well as possibly carrion.
