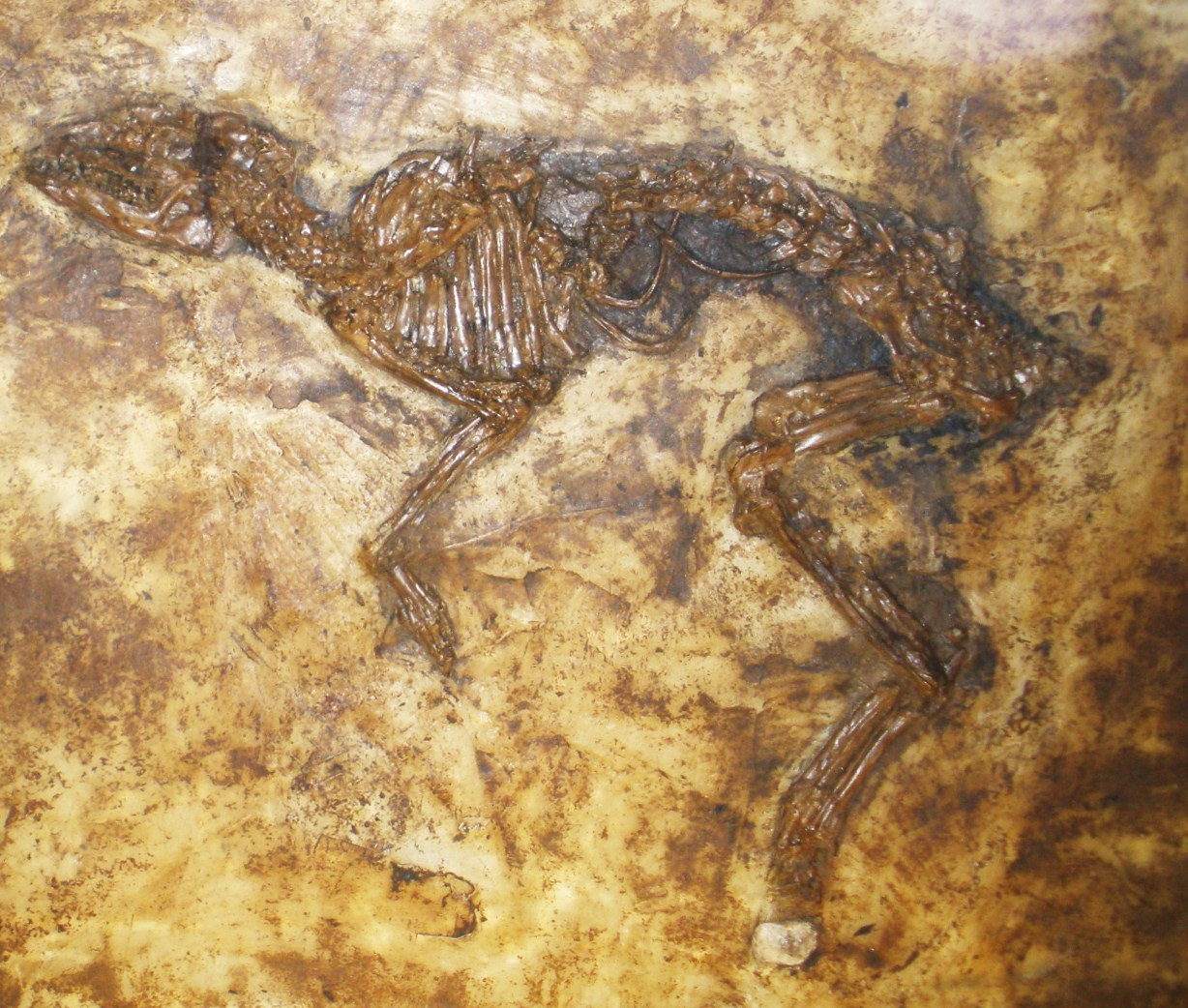
- Messelobunodon schaeferi

Scientific classification
- Kingdom: Animalia
- Phylum: Chordata
- Class: Mammalia
- Infraclass: Placentalia
- Order: Artiodactyla
- Family: †Dichobunidae
- Genus: †Messelobunodon; Franzen, 1980

Species
- †Messelobunodon ceciliensis Franzen and Krumbiegel, 1980; †Messelobunodon schaeferi Franzen, 1980

= Messelobunodon =

Messelobunodon Temporal range: Early Eocene

Extinct genus of mammals

Messelobunodon is an extinct genus of early even-toed ungulate.
