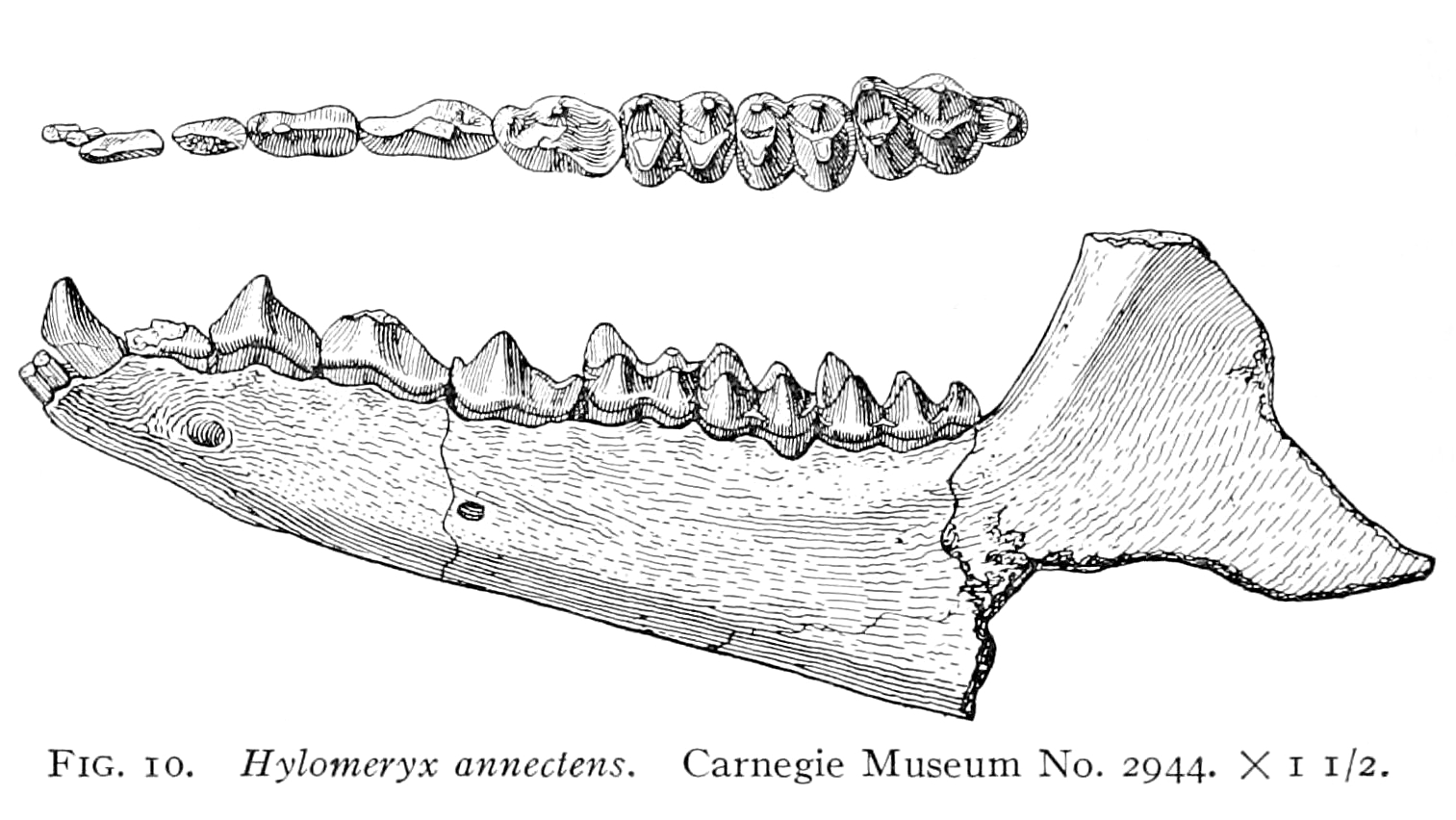
- Hylomeryx annectens

Scientific classification
- Kingdom: Animalia
- Phylum: Chordata
- Class: Mammalia
- Order: Artiodactyla
- Suborder: Tylopoda
- Family: †Homacodontidae; Marsh, 1874

Genera
- see text

= Homacodontidae =

Homacodontidae Temporal range: Early Eocene–Late Oligocene

Extinct family of mammals

Homacodontidae is an extinct family of basal artiodactyl mammals from the early Eocene to late Oligocene of North America, Europe, and Asia.

== Description ==
They were small animals, averaging about the size of a modern rabbit, had many primitive features. In life, they would have resembled a long-tailed muntjac or chevrotain. Dichobunids had four or five toes on each foot, with each toe ending in a small hoof. They had complete sets of teeth, unlike most later artiodactyls, with their more specialist dentitions. The shape of the teeth suggests they were browsers, feeding on small leaves, perhaps in the forest undergrowth. The shape of their bodies and limbs suggests they would have been fast-running animals, unlike most of their contemporaries.

== Taxonomy ==
McKenna and Bell (1997) listed homacodonts as a subfamily of Dichobunidae. However, subsequent authors recognize Homacodontidae as a distinct family in its own right.

The following genera are listed below as per McKenna and Bell (1997), with few additions since:

- Bunomeryx
- Hylomeryx
- Mesomeryx
- Mytonomeryx
- Gagadon
- Pentacemylus
- Hexacodus
- Homacodon
- Microsus
- Texodon
