= Leptochoeridae =

Leptochoeridae Temporal range: Early Eocene–Late Oligocene

Scientific classification
- Kingdom: Animalia
- Phylum: Chordata
- Class: Mammalia
- Order: Artiodactyla
- Family: †Leptochoeridae; Marsh, 1894

Genera
- see text

Extinct family of mammals

Leptochoeridae is an extinct family of basal artiodactyl mammals from the early Eocene to late Oligocene of North America.

== Taxonomy ==
Leptochoeridae was considered a subfamily of Dichobunidae by McKenna and Bell (1997). However, Theodor et al. (2007) treat leptochoerids as a distinct family.

=== Genera ===
- Ibarus
- Laredochoerus
- Leptochoerus
- Stibarus
