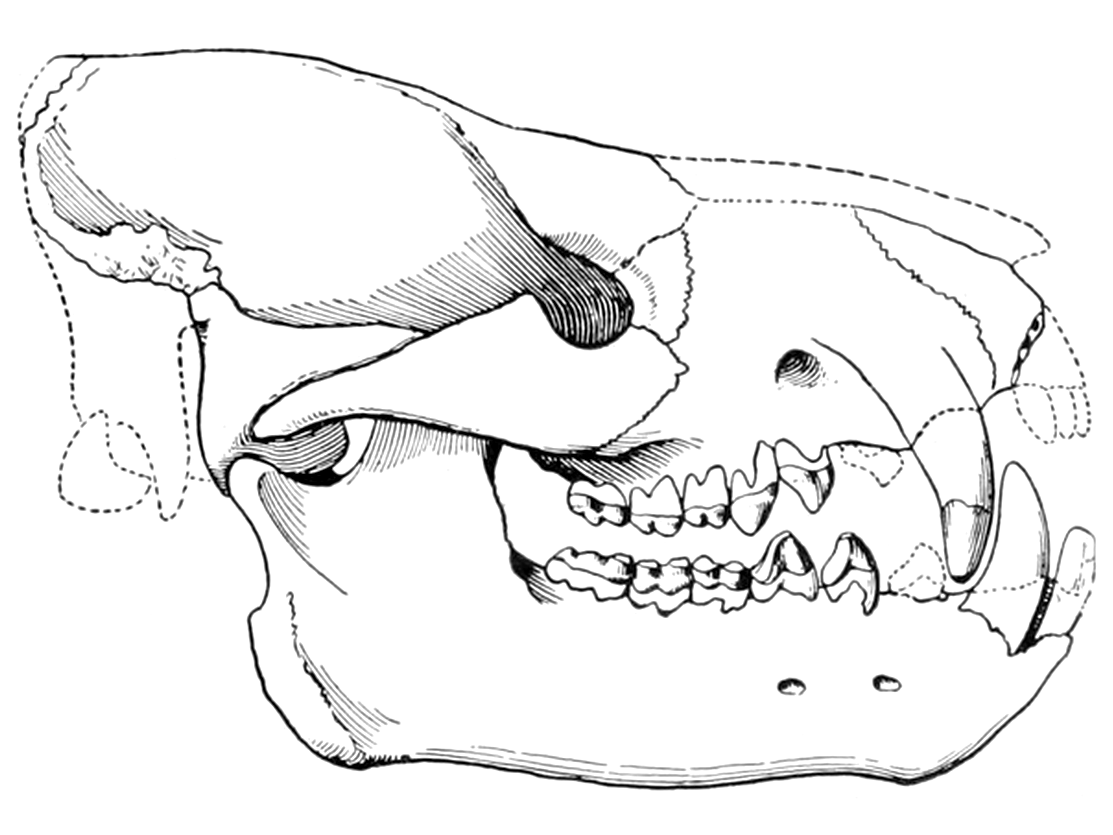
- Reconstruction of the skull of Achaenodon

Scientific classification
- Kingdom: Animalia
- Phylum: Chordata
- Class: Mammalia
- Order: Artiodactyla
- Family: †Helohyidae; Marshall, 1877

Species
- †Achaenodon; †Gobiohyus; †Helohyus; †Pakkohyus; †Parahyus

= Helohyidae =

Helohyidae Temporal range: Middle Eocene–Late Eocene

Family of extinct artiodactyl mammals

Helohyidae is a group of artiodactyl mammals. They were most prominent in the mid-to-upper Eocene (~50 to 39 million years ago).

== Description ==
Helohyids looked somewhat similar to present-day pigs, though were more slender. They possessed prominent canines and molars with bunodont cusps, bulging dental wreaths, and wrinkled enamel. Helohyid upper molars were usually square–shaped due to the enlargement and displacement of the metaconule, but there was also a small hypocone and hypoconule. The paraconule was reduced and there was no mesostyle. Their lower molars increased in size from the front to the back of the jaw, and the paraconid was small or absent. Some genera (like Gobiohyus) possessed small diastemas that separated the premolars from each other. The snout was usually elongated (as in Helohyus), but in some genera (Achaenodon), the snout was very short. Compared to other primitive artiodactyls such as dichobunids, helohyids possessed higher sagittal ridges; the genus Achaenodon, in particular, possessed a large sagittal crest and its size was much larger than those of other helohyids.

== Classification ==
The family Helohyidae was established by Marshall in 1877 to accommodate some forms of early artiodactyl mammals of the American Eocene. In addition to the genus Helohyus, the North American Parahyus and Achaenodon were later ascribed to this family. Other forms come from the Upper-Middle-East Eocene of Asia: Gobiohyus of Inner Mongolia, and Pakkokuhyus of Myanmar. The latter form may be close to the origin of the family of hippo-like anthracotheres. The artiodactyl Simojovelhyus was once thought to be an unusually late-surviving genus of helohyid from the Upper Oligocene (extending the families temporal range by around 10 million years), however recent studies consider it a peccary.

Helohyids have been variously classified as relatives of archaic dichobunids or as close to the origin of anthracotheres. Some authors consider them close relatives of dichobunids, while other have considered at least some members of the family as close relatives of the entelodonts as part of Cetancodontamorpha.
