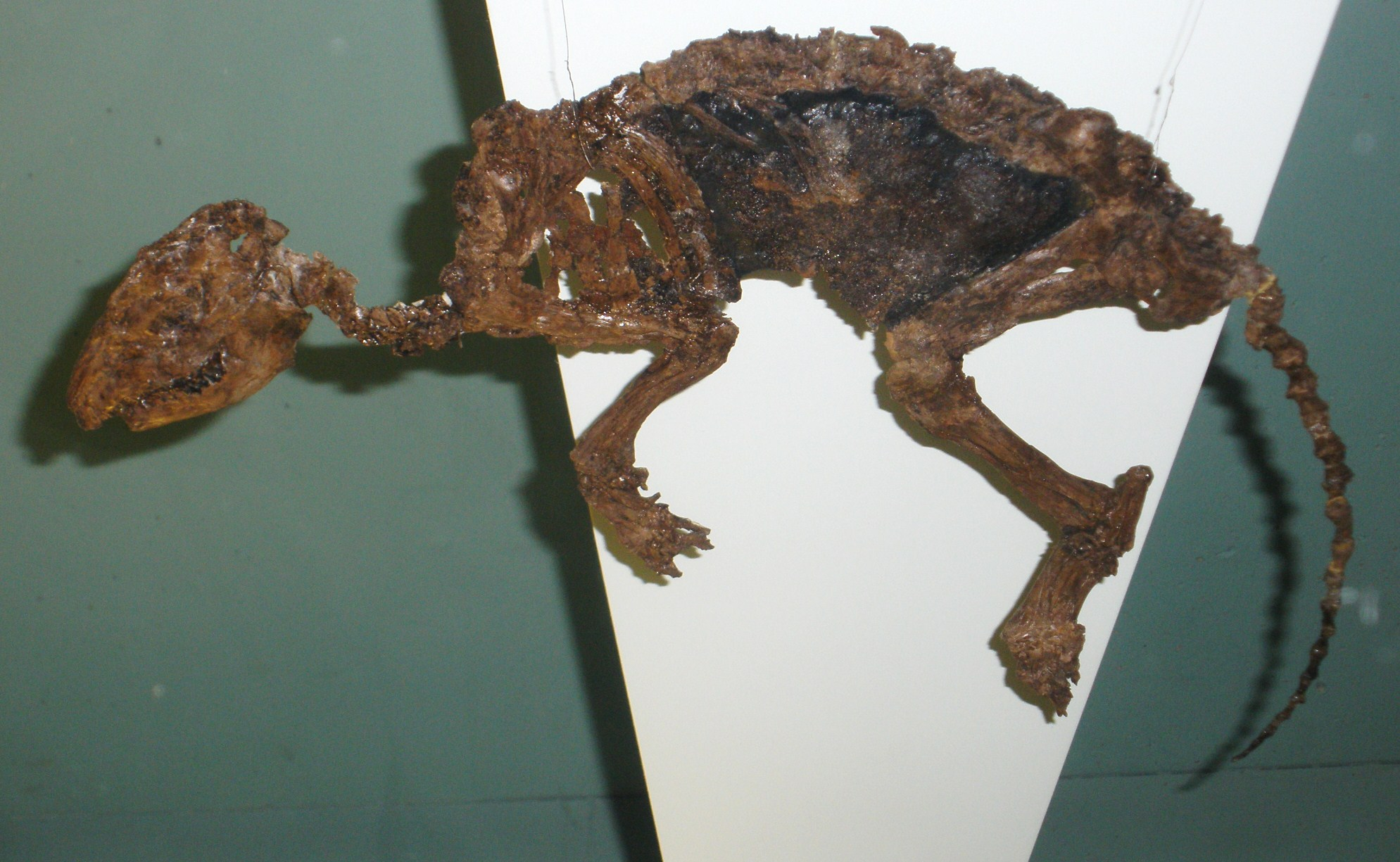
- Aumelasia sp.

Scientific classification
- Kingdom: Animalia
- Phylum: Chordata
- Class: Mammalia
- Infraclass: Placentalia
- Order: Artiodactyla
- Family: †Dichobunidae; Turner, 1849

Genera
- see text

= Dichobunidae =

Dichobunidae Temporal range: Early Eocene–Late Oligocene

Extinct family of mammals

Dichobunidae is an extinct family of basal artiodactyl mammals from the early Eocene to late Oligocene of North America, Europe, and Asia. The Dichobunidae include some of the earliest known artiodactyls, such as Diacodexis.

== Description ==
They were small animals, averaging about the size of a modern rabbit, and had many primitive features. In life, they would have resembled a long-tailed muntjac or chevrotain. Dichobunids had four or five toes on each foot, with each toe ending in a small hoof. They had complete sets of teeth, unlike most later artiodactyls, with their more specialist dentitions. The shape of the teeth suggests they were browsers, feeding on small leaves, perhaps in the forest undergrowth. The shape of their bodies and limbs suggests they would have been fast-running animals, unlike most of their contemporaries.

== Taxonomy ==
Classification of dichobunids following McKenna and Bell:

- † Family Dichobunidae
  - Paraphenacodus
  - Dulcidon
  - Chorlakkia
  - Pakibune
  - Pakkokuhyus
  - Progenitohyus
  - Haqueina
  - Subfamily Dichobuninae
    - Tribe Hyperdichobunini
      - Mouillacitherium
      - Hyperdichobune
    - Tribe Dichobunini
      - Aumelasia
      - Meniscodon
      - Messelobunodon
      - Dichobune
      - Buxobune
      - Neufferia
      - Metriotherium
      - Synaphodus
  - Subfamily Eurodexeinae
    - Eurodexis
    - Eygalayodon
    - Lutzia
    - Parahexacodus
  - Subfamily Diacodexeinae
    - Diacodexis
    - Bunophorus
    - Protodichobune
    - Tapochoerus
    - Neodiacodexis
