= Hans Georg Stehlin =

Swiss paleontologist (1870–1941)

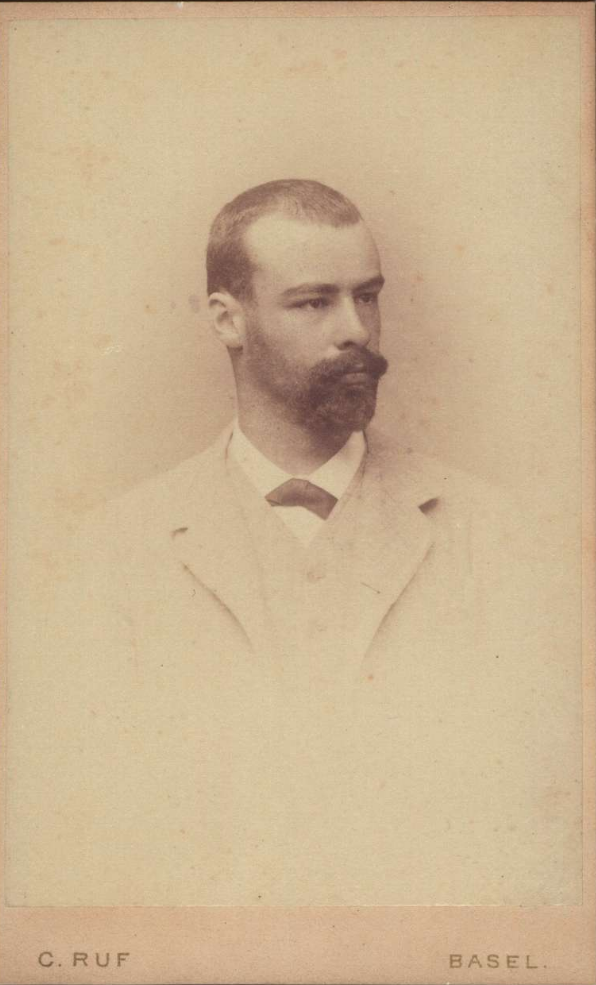
- Born: 13 January 1870
- Died: 18 December 1941 (aged 71)
- Known for: Grande Coupure
- Scientific career
- Fields: Paleontology, Geology
- Workplaces: Museum of Basel

Hans Georg Stehlin (1870–1941) was a Swiss paleontologist and geologist.

Stehlin specialized in vertebrate paleontology, particularly the study of Cenozoic mammals. He published numerous scientific papers on primates and ungulates. He was president of the commission of the Natural History Museum of Basel.

In 1910 Stehlin coined the term Grande Coupure to refer to the extinction event which occurred 33.9 millions of years ago, which defines the Eocene-Oligocene limit. It originated a huge change in organisms, especially the mammals of Europe.

Stehlin is commemorated in the scientific name of a species of lizard, Gallotia stehlini.

== Bibliography ==
- Le Tensorer, Jean-Marie (1998). Le Paléolithique en Suisse. Jérôme Millon. ISBN 978-2-84137-063-4.
