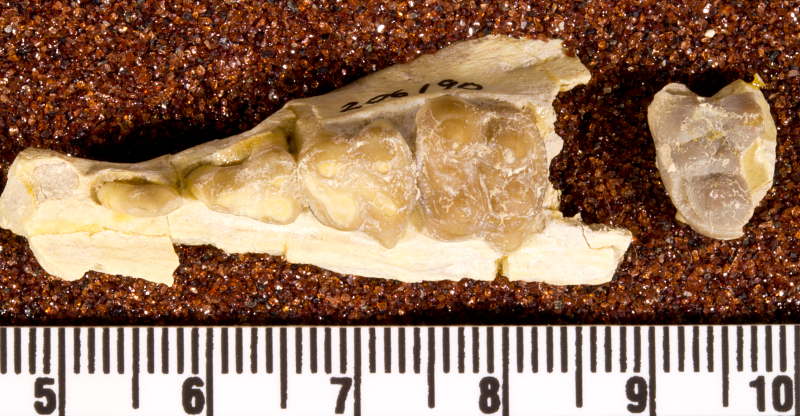
- Left maxilla fragments of P. minor (specimen USNM 206190)

Scientific classification
- Kingdom: Animalia
- Phylum: Chordata
- Class: Mammalia
- Order: Artiodactyla
- Family: Tayassuidae
- Genus: †Perchoerus; Leidy, 1869

Type species
- Palaeochoerus probus Leidy, 1856

Species
- P. minor Cook, 1922; P. nanus Marsh, 1894; P. probus (Leidy, 1856)

Synonyms
- Bothrolabis Cope, 1888; Chaenohyus Cope, 1879

= Perchoerus =

Perchoerus Temporal range: Late Eocene - Early Oligocene 36–30 Ma

Extinct genus of peccary

Perchoerus is an extinct genus of suine (pig-like mammal) from the Eocene and Oligocene of North America. Three species are known. While often considered one of the earliest peccaries (Tayassuidae), other studies have recovered it to be a basal suine outside of either peccaries or Suidae (Old World pigs). Perchoerus is a rare component of the White River fauna, and the largest species, P. probus, also occurs in the John Day Formation of Oregon.

== Description ==
Perchoerus had a steeply-sloped skull with a short snout. It was similar in some respects to Thinohyus, another peccary-like suine from the Oligocene of the John Day Formation. Both are rare, and historically Perchoerus and Thinohyus have often been confused for each other. There are still some clear differences: Perchoerus has a shorter snout, stronger sagittal crests, and more lightly-built zygomatic and occipital areas. In addition, its M3 (upper third molar) is simpler and shorter from front-to-back, and there is less of a gap (diastema) between its canines and premolars.

As reported by Scott (1913), the molars of Perchoerus are generally quadrituberculate (four-cusped) and lack any of the accessory cuspules (minor cusps) present in modern peccaries. The feet bore 4 functional digits and had free metacarpals. The bones in the forearm were separate rather than fused.

=== Species ===
- P. minor is the oldest and smallest known species of Perchoerus, only the size of a house cat. It is known from skull and tooth material from the Chadronian (latest Eocene, 36-34 Ma) of Nebraska, South Dakota, and Wyoming. Apart from its minuscule size, the jaw more slender and the molars more simple than other Perchoerus species.
- P. nanus was slightly younger and larger, from the Orellan (earliest Oligocene, 34-32 Ma) of Nebraska, South Dakota, and Colorado. It was intermediate between the other two species in anatomy.
- P. probus was the latest and largest species, from the Whitneyan to early Arikareean (Oligocene, 32-30 Ma) of Nebraska, South Dakota, and Oregon. The type species of Perchoerus, P. probus was about as large as living peccaries (~35 kg (77 lb)), and is known from more remains than the other species. Apart from its larger size, it also had larger cheek teeth and a more complex structure of its third molars (m3 and M3).

== Palaeoecology ==
Low δ^{13}C values from the teeth of P. probus suggest that it was an inhabitant of dense riparian habitats. The rarity of its fossils also support a preference for forests (where fossil preservation is difficult), and its tooth structure implies that it was a browser of tough vegetation.
