= Thaumastognathus =

Thaumastognathus Temporal range: Middle Eocene – Late Eocene 40–37.5 Ma

Scientific classification
- Kingdom: Animalia
- Phylum: Chordata
- Class: Mammalia
- Order: Artiodactyla
- Family: †Choeropotamidae
- Genus: †Thaumastognathus; Filhol, 1890
- Species: †T. quercyi

Binomial name
- †Thaumastognathus quercyi Filhol, 1890

Synonyms
- Taumastognathus Filhol, 1890; Taumastognatus Filhol, 1890

Extinct genus of endemic Palaeogene European artiodactyls

Thaumastognathus is an extinct genus of Paleogene artiodactyls within the Choeropotamidae family. It was endemic to western Europe and lived from the Middle to Late Eocene. The genus and its only species T. quercyi were first described by French palaeontologist Henri Filhol in 1890. Thaumastognathus is best known from several mandibles with largely complete dental sets, with one larger mandible probably being an intraspecific variation. Although it was large in size in relation to its family, it was smaller than Choeropotamus and differed from it by several traits like thinner tooth enamel and longer diastemata; both genera share traits such as a caniniform first premolar.

== Taxonomy ==
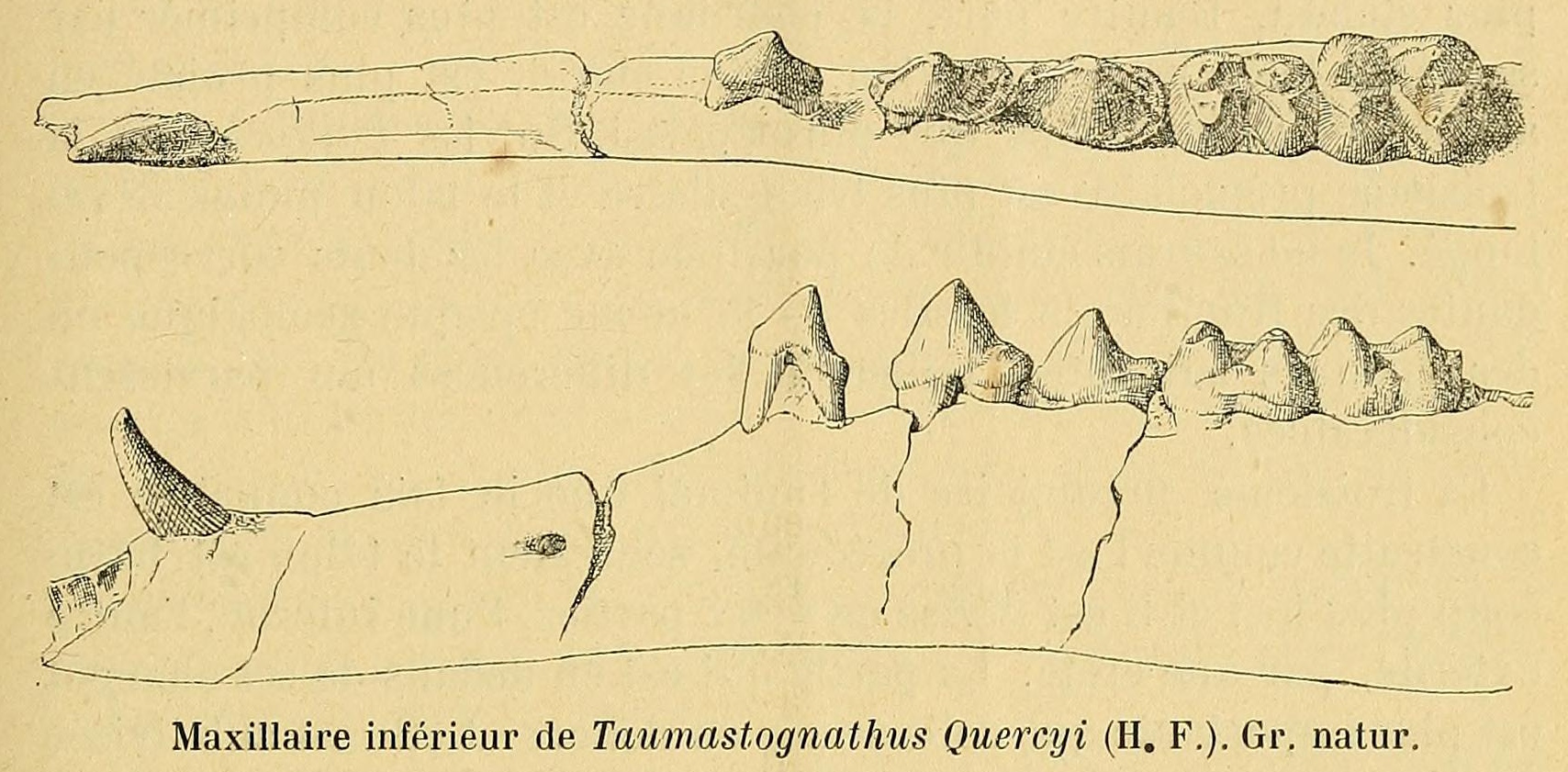
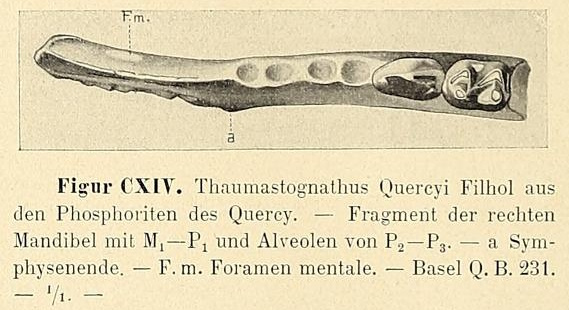
Illustrations of the left (1890, left) and right (1908, right) mandibles of Thaumastognathus quercyi with dentitions

In 1890, French palaeontologist Henri Filhol stated that he was to introduce a new genus of mammal from the phosphorite deposits of Quercy, represented by a partial left mandible with a canine, premolars, and molars. He pointed out that the incisors increased in size from the first to the third in a row. He compared its dentition with those of other fossil artiodactyls, suggesting that it was distinct from most of them but that the premolars were somewhat similar to those of anthracotheres like Microbunodon. Filhol stated that given that it did not seemingly have a close analogue among artiodactyl groups like ruminants, he designated it the genus name Taumastognatus and the species name Taumastognathus Quercyi (the genus name being spelled differently).

The genus name, for unclear reasons, was subsequently emended to Thaumastognathus starting from later 19th century taxa indexes onward. In 1908, Swiss palaeontologist Hans Georg Stehlin confirmed the validity and spelling of the genus Thaumastognathus, suggesting that it is related to the other artiodactyls Haplobunodon and Lophiobunodon. He additionally described a less complete right mandible from the Quercy phosphorites that were held in a Basel fossil collection. Stehlin suggested that a caniniform tooth being similar to that of the ruminant Bachitherium means that it was actually a first premolar rather than a canine.

=== Classification ===
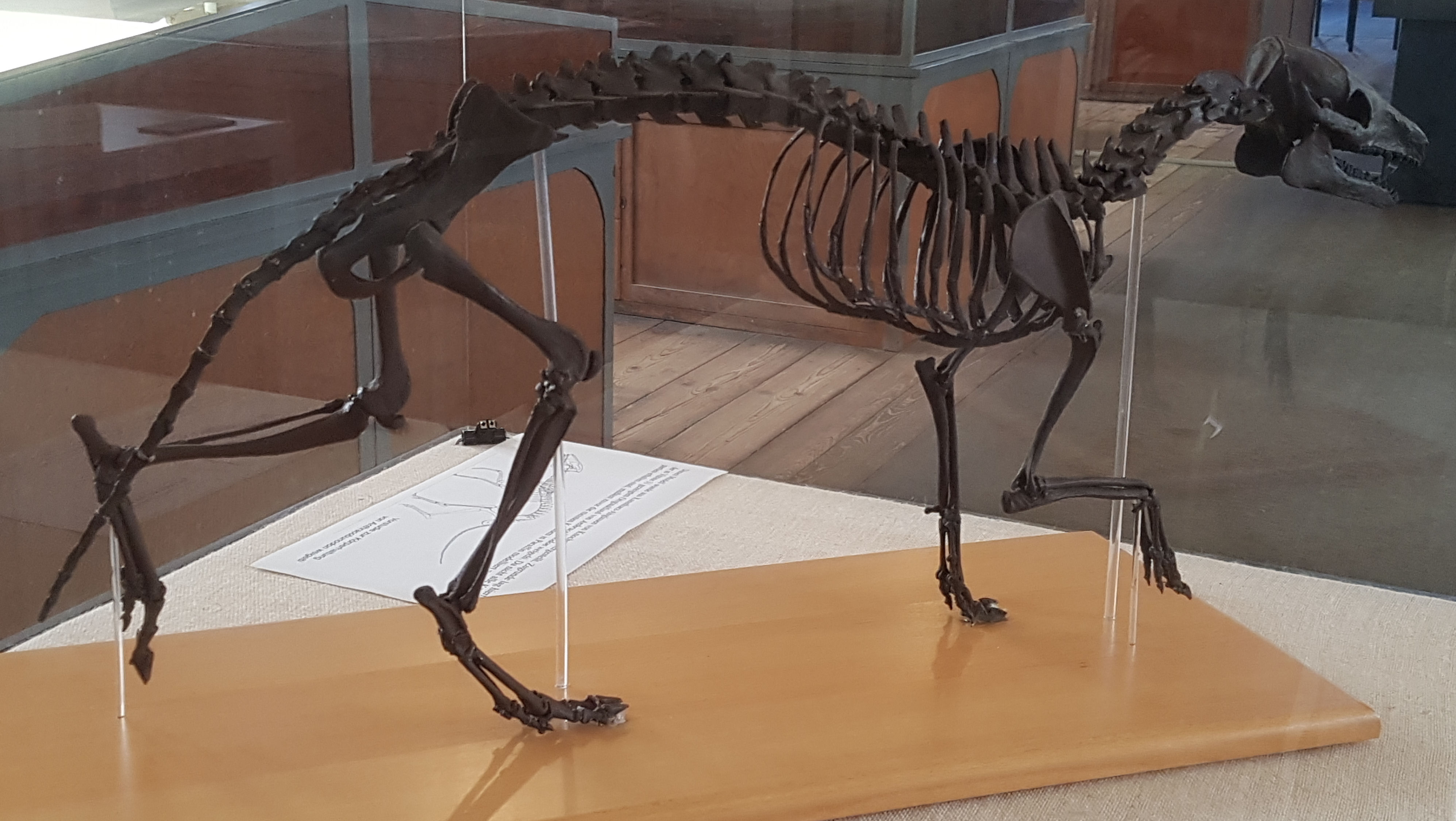
Reconstructed skeleton of Amphirhagatherium, an endemic European artiodactyl genus classified within the Choeropotamidae. The polyphyletic nature of the Choeropotamidae makes the placements of its genera uncertain and inadequately defined.

Thaumastognathus is classified within the Choeropotamidae, a Palaeogene artiodactyl family endemic to western Europe that lived from the Middle Eocene to the Early Oligocene. Choeropotamidae had a particularly complicated taxonomic history, as many genera now classified in the family, other than Choeropotamus, were not originally recognized as such in the 20th century. In particular, many genera like Haplobunodon, Lophiobunodon, and Rhagatherium were classified in a separate family called the "Haplobunodontidae". As a result, Choeropotamidae had, by some sources, been considered a monotypic family, meaning that Choeropotamus was the only genus classified in it. However, the Haplobunodontidae had been synonymized by later taxonomists, its genera being reclassified into the Choeropotamidae. However, some authors have suggested that the Haplobunodontidae should be revived due to questions relating to the polyphyly of the Choeropotamidae.

The Choeropotamidae as currently defined is polyphyletic. This is because cladistic analyses of "choeropotamids" based on dental anatomy reveal that not all genera share close synapomorphies (or traits of the latest common ancestor) to prove close relations between them. However, disagreements remain on whether or not Haplobunodon lies within the Choeropotamidae sensu stricto (in a strict sense) to justify a separate Haplobunodontidae family. Because the definition of the Choeropotamidae is polyphyletic and not agreed upon, the Choeropotamidae requires further analyses.

Regardless of taxonomic problems, the Choeropotamidae has been well-defined as one of the endemic European Palaeogene artiodactyl groups that lived primarily during the Eocene. The Choeropotamidae itself from the middle Eocene up to the earliest Oligocene. Masillabune, arguably the oldest choeropotamid, made its first appearance during the unit MP11 of the Mammal Palaeogene zones. It was followed by the likes of Haplobunodon and Amphirhagatherium in MP12 and Hallebune in MP13. Two of the latest-appearing choeropotamids, Choeropotamus and Thaumastognathus, made their first appearances in MP16. Both Choeropotamus and Amphirhagatherium, the latest-surviving choeropotamids, extended up to MP20, coinciding with the Grande Coupure extinction event in western Europe. They are generally regarded as close relatives of the Cebochoeridae, another endemic European artiodactyl family. One phylogenetic tree example of the Choeropotamidae and Haplobunodontidae being defined as separate families according to Vincent Luccisano et al. in 2020 is shown below:

- Artiodactyla
  - Bunophorus
  - - Gunophorus
    - Diacodexis
  - - - Protodichobune
      - Eurodexis
    - - - Buxobune
        - - Mouillacitherium
          - Meniscodon
        - - - Hyperdichobune
            - - Dichobune robertiana
              - - Dichobune leporina
                - - Homacodon
                  - - Gobiohyus
                    - Suina
                      - - Khirtharia
                        - Entelodon
                      - - Palaeocheorus
                        - Perchoerus
          - - Haplobunodontidae
              - Haplobunodon
              - - Cuisitherium
                - Lophiobunodon
            - - Mixtotherium
              - - Robiacina
                - - - - Dacrytherium
                      - Diplobune
                    - - Xiphodon
                      - Paraxiphodon
                  - - - Cainotherium
                      - Paroxacron
                    - - Archaeomeryx
                      - - Amphimeryx
                        - Pseudamphimeryx
      - - Aumelasia
        - - - Hallebune
            - Amphirhagatherium
          - - Cebochoeridae
              - Cebochoerus
              - Gervachoerus
            - - Choeropotamus
              - Siamotherium

In 2022, Weppe conducted a phylogenetic analysis in his academic thesis regarding Palaeogene artiodactyl lineages, focusing most specifically on the endemic European families. One monophyletic set consisted of the Dichobuninae, Cebochoeridae, and two clades of the polyphyletic Choeropotamidae. He suggested that Cuisitherium and Lophiobunodon were not very closely related to the true clade of choeropotamids, consisting of Thaumastognathus, Choeropotamus, Amphirhagatherium, Rhagatherium, and the polyphyletic Haplobunodon; his analysis disagrees with other sources suggesting that some genera like Haplobunodon were not closely related to Choeropotamus and states that the Haplobunodontidae is therefore not valid. More specifically, he defined Thaumastognathus, Choeropotamus, Haplobunodon lydekkeri, and "H." solodurense as forming one specific clade of the Choeropotamidae sensu stricto.

== Description ==
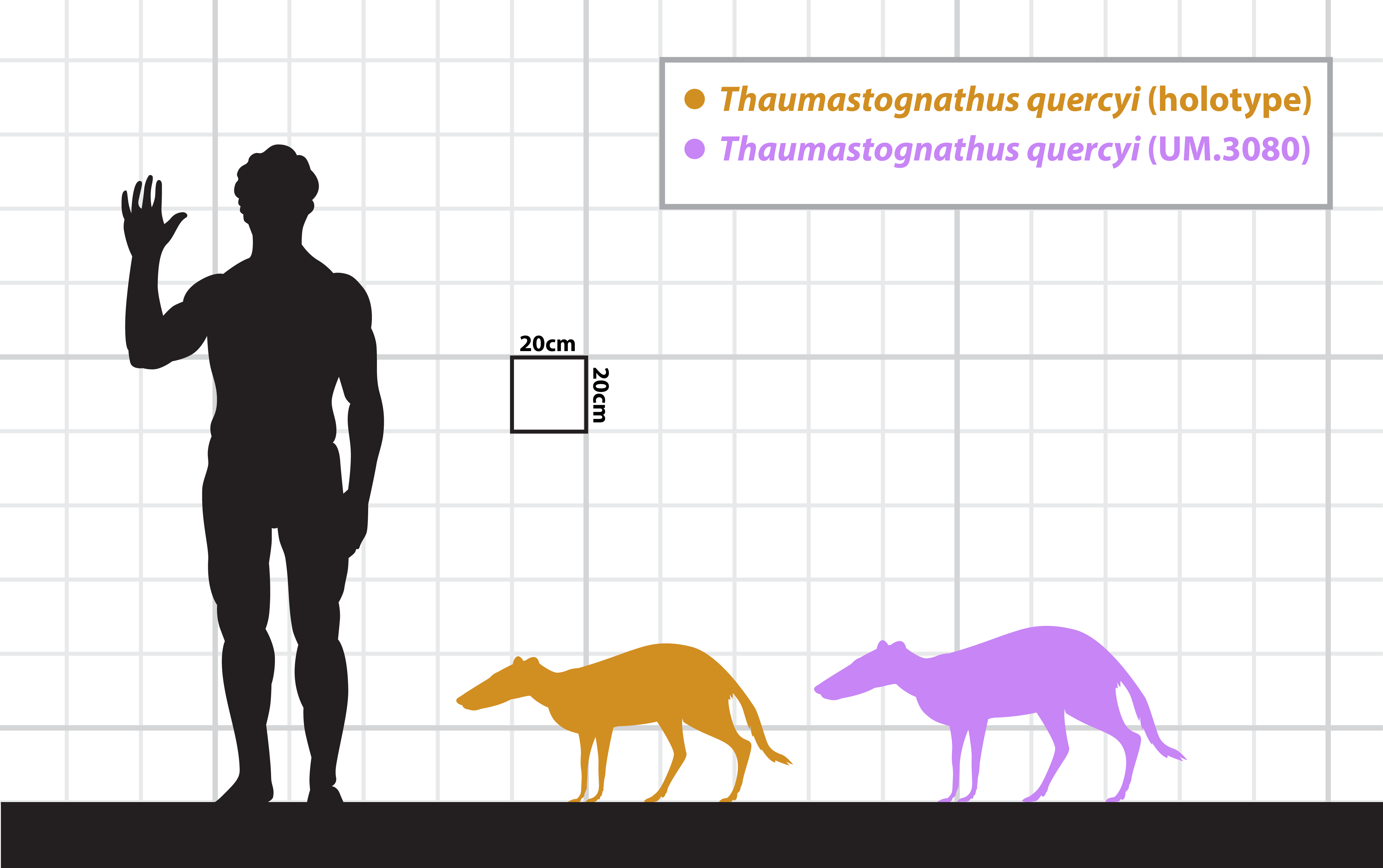
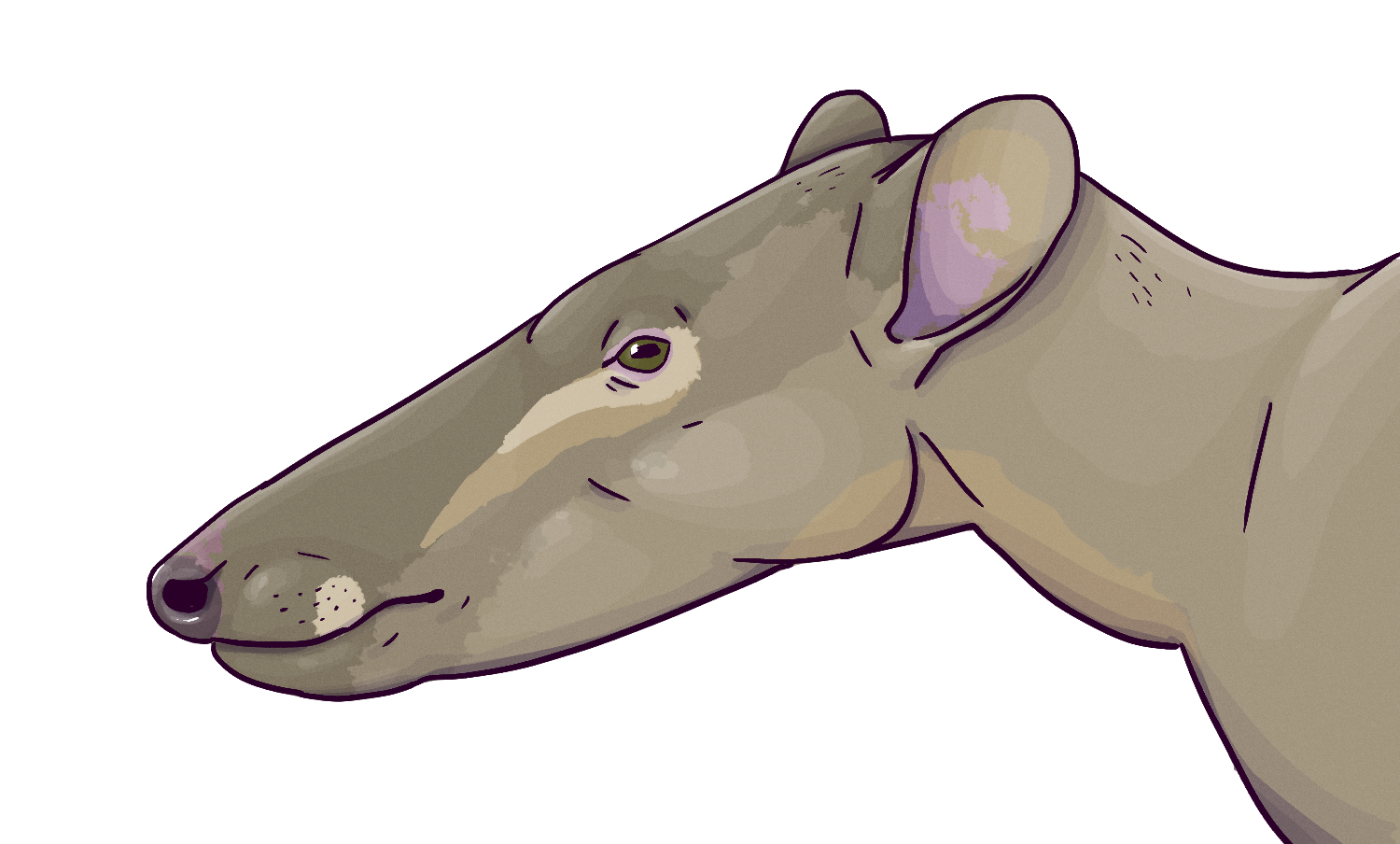
Size comparison of Thaumastognathus based on known remains (left) and a restoration of the head of Thaumastognathus (right)

In addition to mandibles described by Filhol in 1890 and Stehlin in 1908, Thaumastognathus is also known by a nearly complete mandible from the French commune of Euzet that was first assigned to Choeropotamus depereti by Jean Sudre in 1978 then reclassified to the former by Jerry J. Hooker and Katherine M. Thomas in 2001. The two latter authors. While mostly known from lower dentition as opposed to upper ones, Hooker and Katherine also reclassified an upper molar that was previously classified to Haplobunodon sp. into Thaumastognathus. Like Choeropotamus, Thaumastognathus is diagnosed in part in having an elongated snout and a horizontal ramus of the mandible that is low, its height being about equal from the P_{3} (third molar premolars (P/p)) to M_{3} (molar (M/m)) teeth. The mandibular symphysis is elongated, extending all the way to the front part of P_{3}.

Its dentition is bunoselenodont (bunodont (low and rounded) plus selenodont (crescent-shaped ridges)). The diastema between P_{1} and P_{2} is about a quarter of the total length of the mandible, with one of them measuring 34 mm (1.3 in) long. P_{1} is caniniform (canine-like) while P_{3} and P_{4} do not have molarized (molar-like) forms. Both Thaumasognathus and Choeropotamus have long diastemata and caniniform P_{1} teeth. Thaumastognathus differs from Choeropotamus in its thinner tooth enamel, the lack of any mesoconid and entostylid cusps in its lower molars, and the presence of a unicuspid (one-cusped) M_{3} with a hypoconulid cusp on it. The P_{4} of Thaumastognathus is similar to that of "Haplobunodon" solodurense in lacking some cusps like the metaconid. The holotype of Thaumastognathus suggests that its diastemata, four times longer than M_{1}, is longer than those of other choeropotamids. The diastemata of the Euzet mandible, itself probably the result of intraspecific variation, is slightly shorter.

Thaumastognathus quercyi is described as a large-sized choeropotamid (with a few other genera like Choeropotamus also being described as large-sized members), the M_{2} tooth measuring 10 mm (0.39 in) long and 8 mm (0.31 in) wide. The length of the mandible up to the alveolus of P_{1} measures 140 mm (5.5 in) long while its ascending ramus is 60 mm (2.4 in) high. The larger-sized mandible from Euzet has length measurements of 50 mm (2.0 in) from P_{4} to M_{3} and 35 mm (1.4 in) from M_{1} to M_{3}. Although this individual specimen is larger than other Thaumastognathus fossils, it is still smaller than the contemporary C. depereti, which is found in the same locality as it.

== Palaeoecology ==
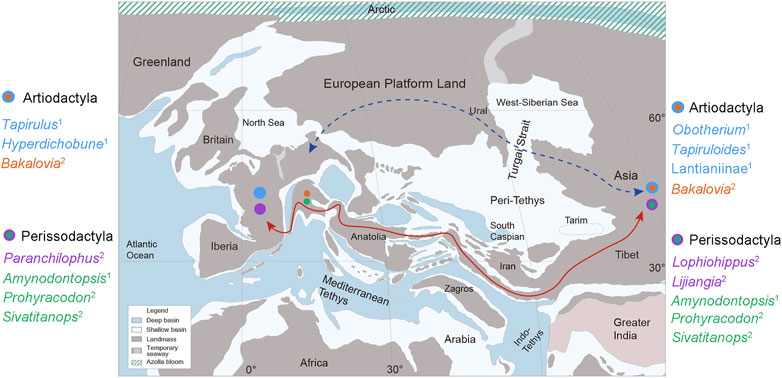
Palaeogeography of Europe and Asia during the Middle Eocene with possible artiodactyl and perissodactyl dispersal routes.

For much of the Eocene, a hothouse climate with humid, tropical environments with consistently high precipitations prevailed. Modern mammalian orders including the Perissodactyla, Artiodactyla, and Primates (or the suborder Euprimates) appeared already by the Early Eocene, diversifying rapidly and developing dentitions specialized for folivory. The omnivorous forms mostly either switched to folivorous diets or went extinct by the Middle Eocene (47–37 Ma) along with the archaic "condylarths". By the Late Eocene (approx. 37–33 mya), most of the ungulate form dentitions shifted from bunodont (or rounded) cusps to cutting ridges (i.e. lophs) for folivorous diets.

Land connections between western Europe and North America were interrupted around 53 Ma. From the Early Eocene up until the Grande Coupure extinction event (56–33.9 mya), western Eurasia was separated into three landmasses: western Europe (an archipelago), Balkanatolia (in-between the Paratethys Sea of the north and the Neotethys Ocean of the south), and eastern Eurasia. The Holarctic mammalian faunas of western Europe were therefore mostly isolated from other landmasses including Greenland, Africa, and eastern Eurasia, allowing for endemism to develop. Therefore, the European mammals of the Late Eocene (MP17–MP20 of the Mammal Palaeogene zones) were mostly descendants of endemic Middle Eocene groups.

The stratigraphic range of Thaumastognathus quercyi is not as clear due to having been best known from old Quercy fossil collections with no clear temporal range documentations. It is listed in localities dating back to MP16 like Robiac and Eclépens A. By then, it would have coexisted with perissodactyls (Palaeotheriidae, Lophiodontidae, and Hyrachyidae), non-endemic artiodactyls (Dichobunidae and Tapirulidae), endemic European artiodactyls (Choeropotamidae, Cebochoeridae, Mixtotheriidae, Anoplotheriidae, Amphimerycidae, and Xiphodontidae), and primates (Adapidae, Omomyidae). It also cooccurred with metatherians (Herpetotheriidae), rodents (Ischyromyidae, Theridomyoidea, Gliridae), eulipotyphlans, bats, apatotherians, carnivoraformes (Miacidae), and hyaenodonts (Hyainailourinae, Proviverrinae).

Other fossil mammals found from the deposits of Robiac include the herpetotheriids Amphiperatherium and Peratherium, apatemyid Heterohyus, nyctithere Saturninia, omomyids (Necrolemur, Pseudoloris, and Microchoerus), adapid Adapis, ischyromyid Ailuravus, glirid Glamys, pseudosciurid Sciuroides, theridomyids Elfomys and Pseudoltinomys, hyaenodonts (Paracynohyaenodon, Paroxyaena, and Cynohyaenodon), carnivoraformes (Simamphicyon, Quercygale, and Paramiacis), cebochoerids Cebochoerus and Acotherulum, choeropotamid Haplobunodon, tapirulid Tapirulus, anoplotheriids Dacrytherium, Catodontherium, and Robiatherium, dichobunid Mouillacitherium, robiacinid Robiacina, xiphodonts (Xiphodon, Dichodon, Haplomeryx), amphimerycid Pseudamphimeryx, lophiodont Lophiodon, hyrachyid Chasmotherium, and palaeotheres (Palaeotherium, Plagiolophus, Leptolophus, Anchilophus, Metanchilophus, Lophiotherium, Pachynolophus, Eurohippus).

By MP16, a faunal turnover occurred, marking the disappearances of the lophiodonts and European hyrachyids as well as the extinctions of all European crocodylomorphs except for the alligatoroid Diplocynodon. The causes of the faunal turnover have been attributed to a shift from humid and highly tropical environments to drier and more temperate forests with open areas and more abrasive vegetation. The surviving herbivorous faunas shifted their dentitions and dietary strategies accordingly to adapt to abrasive and seasonal vegetation. The environments were still subhumid and full of subtropical evergreen forests, however. The Palaeotheriidae was the sole remaining European perissodactyl group, and frugivorous-folivorous or purely folivorous artiodactyls became the dominant group in western Europe.

The latest known appearance of Thaumastognathus is in the MP17a locality of Euzet. A large majority of other mammal faunas including artiodactyls have continued to coexist with it at the same time, although some other migrant mammals have arrived there as well.
