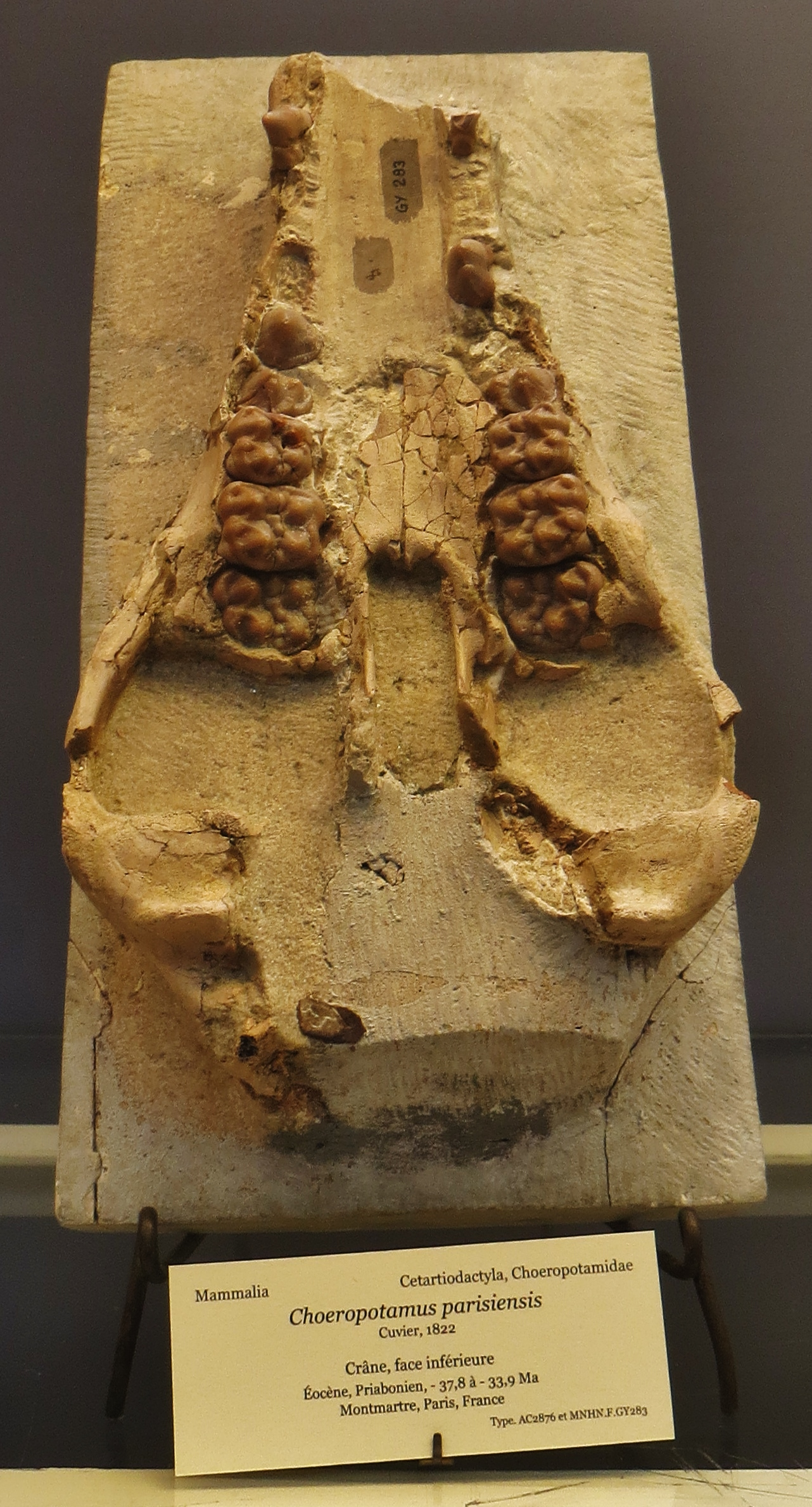
- Choeropotamus parisiensis cranium, National Museum of Natural History, France

Scientific classification
- Kingdom: Animalia
- Phylum: Chordata
- Class: Mammalia
- Order: Artiodactyla
- Family: †Choeropotamidae
- Genus: †Choeropotamus; Cuvier, 1822

Type species
- †Choeropotamus parisiensis Cuvier, 1824

Other species
- †C. affinis Gervais, 1852; †C. lautricensis Noulet, 1870; †C. depereti Stehlin, 1908; †C. sudrei Casanovas-Cladellas, 1975

Synonyms
- Genus synonymy: Chaeropotame Cuvier, 1822; Cheropotame Cuvier, 1822; Cheropotames Cuvier, 1822; Chaeropotamus Desmarest, 1822; Cheiropotamus Ritgen, 1824; Cheropotomus Swainson, 1835; Cheropotamus von Meyer, 1838; Chöropotamus Roger, 1896; Synonyms of C. parisiensis: Chaeropotamus Gypsorum Desmarest, 1822; Choeropotamus Cuvieri Owen, 1841; Synonyms of C. affinis: Choeropotamus Matritensis von Meyer, 1840

= Choeropotamus =

Choeropotamus Temporal range: Middle Eocene – Early Oligocene 40–33.4 Ma

Extinct genus of endemic Palaeogene European artiodactyls

Choeropotamus is an extinct genus of Palaeogene artiodactyls and the type genus of the family Choeropotamidae. It was endemic to western Europe and lived from the Middle Eocene up to the earliest Oligocene. Choeropotamus was first described and named in 1822 by the French naturalist George Cuvier, who noted its distinct morphology from other contemporary fossil artiodactyls. Cuvier reused the name Choeropotamus, first applied by the 17th century Venetian physician Prospero Alpini to describe stuffed hippopotamuses that he incorrectly thought to be distinct species. There are currently five described species of Choeropotamus, with C. parisiensis being the type species.

Choeropotamus had a broad and low, yet elongated skull, with a similarly elongated but narrow mandible. Its cheek teeth generally possessed diastemata (or gaps) in between them. Although mostly known from dental fossils and mostly lacking in postcranial evidence, its skull anatomy and evolutionary history have both been well-recorded, with sufficient evidence of the five species forming a progressive lineage that gained cusps in the molars and increased in size; from the earliest and smallest C. lautricensis to the latest-appearing and largest C. parisiensis, which may have weighed about 58.8 kg (130 lb), sizeable compared to many contemporary artiodactyls. The bunodont (round-cusped) molars of Choeropotamus point towards either a frugivorous or omnivorous diet, in which it could have occasionally consumed meat. The sharp front teeth on Choeropotamus may had also been used for sparring with other individuals as part of intraspecific competition in addition to possibly enabling it to consume meat.

During the time that Choeropotamus was extant, western Europe was an archipelago with a tropical-subtropical climate that was isolated from the rest of Eurasia, the artiodactyl having lived alongside various other animals which were also highly endemic. It went extinct by the Grande Coupure extinction/faunal turnover event, coinciding with shifts towards further glaciation and seasonality plus dispersals of Asian immigrant faunas into western Europe.

== Taxonomy ==
=== Research history ===
==== Early history ====
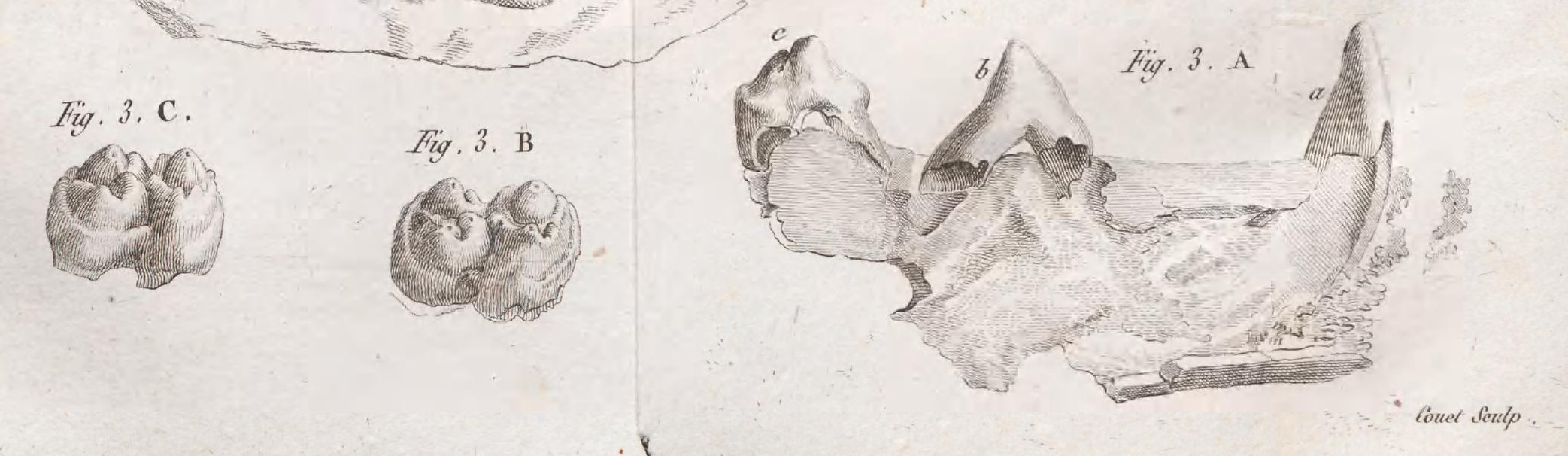
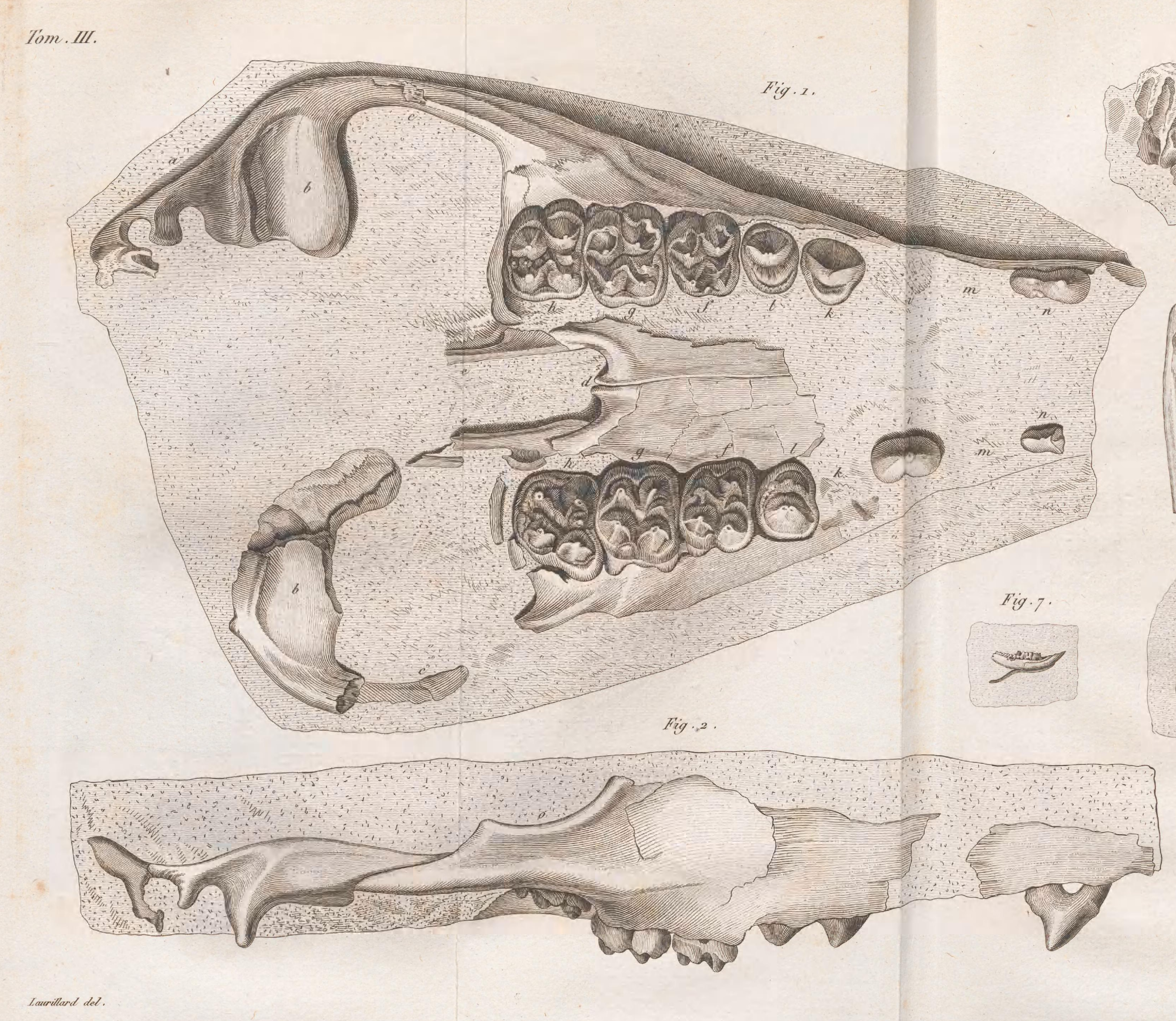
1822 illustrations of cranial and dental remains of Choeropotamus parisiensis by Georges Cuvier

In 1822, French palaeontologist Georges Cuvier described cranial and dental fossil remains of what he called a distinct "pachyderm" genus. The first fossils in his possession consisted of molars and canines, and were delivered to him by itinerary author Vaysse de Villiers, who had found them in the gypsum quarries of the French commune of Villejuif. He noted that the canines were small like that of a peccary but that this new pachyderm species would have been larger-bodied than a peccary. He later studied partial dental and skull remains from Montmartre, which include the palatine bone, zygomatic arches, and a lower edge of an orbit on one of the sides. He noted that the molars were roughly square-shaped, were slightly wider than long, and had four main cusps that were blunt along with two smaller ones in between. Cuvier additionally pointed out that the zygomatic arches were different in form from both suids and peccaries. Theorizing that the extinct animal was related to pigs, he provisionally assigned the bones to the new genus Chæropotame, alternatively spelled by Cuvier as "Cheropotame" and "Cheropotames."

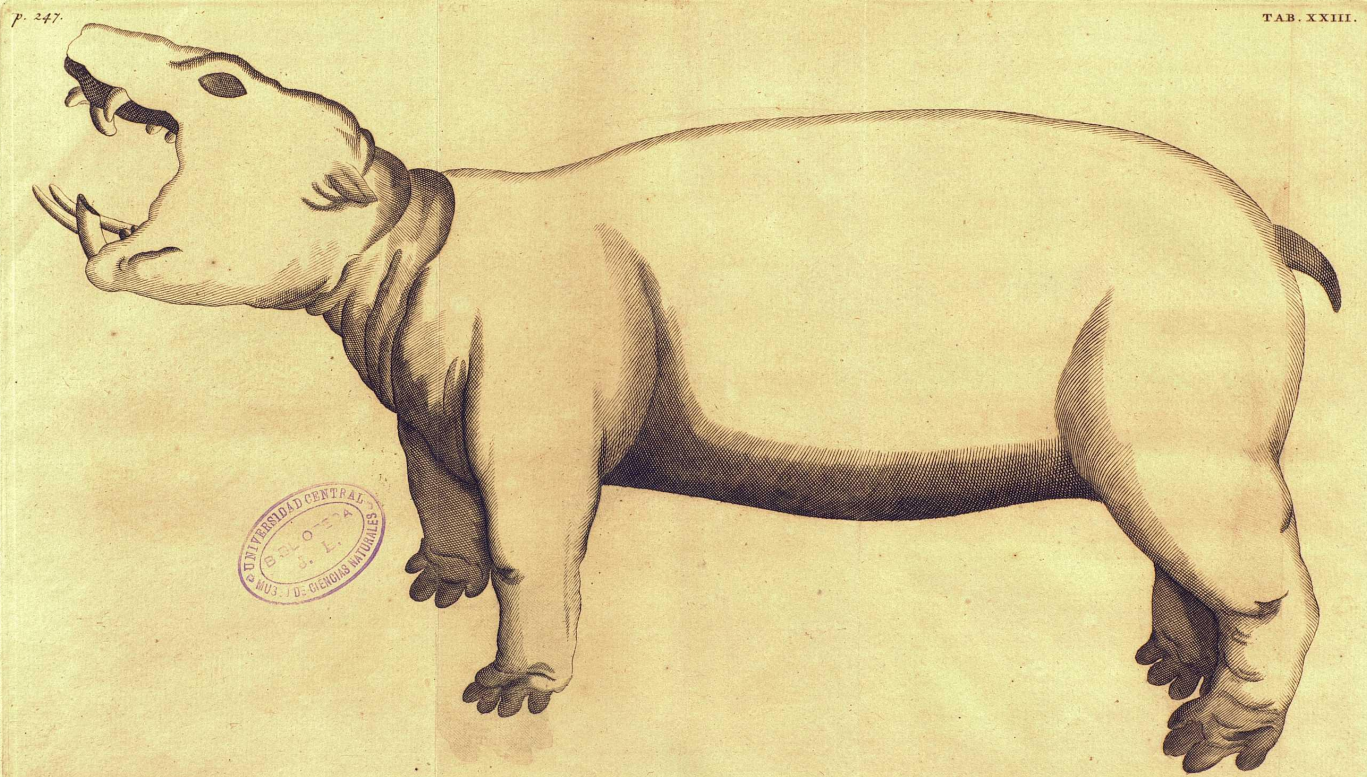
A 17th century sketch of a hippopotamus based on stuffed specimens from Egypt. The name "choeropotamus" was used informally for a few stuffed hippopotamuses by Prospero Alpini and was later reused as a genus name by Cuvier in 1822.

The same year, French zoologist Anselme Gaëtan Desmarest acknowledged the genus as valid but emended the name to Chæropotamus and erected the species name Chæropotamus Gypsorum. In 1824, Cuvier emended the genus name to Chœropotamus and listed the first species name Chœropotamus parisiensis. The genus name Choeropotamus means "river pig," which is a compound of the Greek prefix χοίρος ('choíros') meaning "pig" and the suffix ποτάμι ('potámi') meaning "river." Prior to his publication on the genus Choeropotamus, Cuvier had noted that the name Chœropotame had previously been used in the written scientific account Historiae AEgypti naturalis by Venetian physician Prospero Alpini (his work being published in 1735, over a century after his death). Alpini applied the names "Cheropotamo," "Chœropotame", and "Cheropotamus" to two stuffed hippopotamuses from the Egyptian part of the Nile River that he mistakenly thought were distinct animals because of the two individuals' dentitions being supposedly unique from other hippopotamuses. In addition, Alpini said that the name was used by ancient Greeks, but Cuvier was unable to confirm such. Cuvier in 1822 directly confirmed in a footnote that he borrowed the genus name from Alpini's work.

In 1829, German palaeontologist Christian Erich Hermann von Meyer said that German physician Samuel Thomas von Sömmerring gave him fossil remains from the German municipality of Georgensgmünd, among them molars and canines that were similar to those of the babirusa. He designated the species name Chaeropotamus Sömmeringii in honor of von Sömmerring. The palaeontologist then erected the second species C. Meissneri based on dental fossils from the Swiss locality of Rappehfluh (near Aarberg). Later in 1834, von Meyer described a fragmentary lower jaw that he found back in 1805 at Rappehfluh, noting again that the dentition was similar to that of the babirusa in size, shape, and wear patterns. He cited a monography of fossil from the Molasse basin written by Swiss geologist Bernhard Studer regarding why he placed C. Meissneri in Choeropotamus. He then wrote about teeth of C. Sömmeringii from Georgensgmünd, noting that the species placement could be problematic. He explained that unlike C. Sömmeringii, C. Parisiensis seemingly lacked a lower molar in its lower jaw and did not closely match up in dental arrangement. He also erected the suid genus Hyotherium and reassigned C. Sömmeringii to it as H. Sömmeringii. In 1840, He referenced another erected species C. Matritensis based on molars from the Spanish locality of Cerro de San Isidro without further specifying about them. Von Meyer later reassigned C. Meissneri to Hyotherium in 1841.

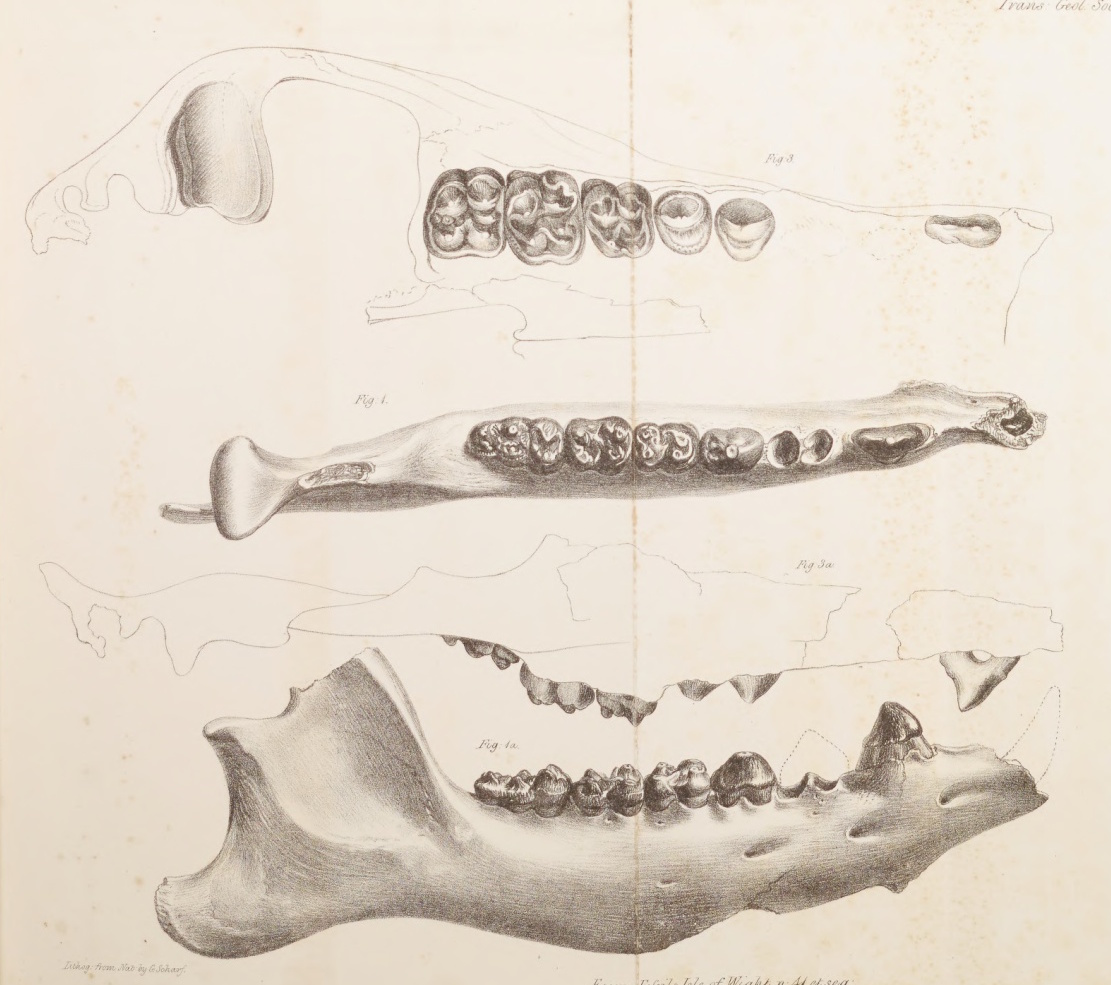
Illustrations of the fossil jaws of C. parisiensis from Montmartre and the Isle of Wight, 1841

In 1841, British palaeontologist Richard Owen described a right ramus of a mandible of Choeropotamus from the fossil collection belonging to fellow naturalist William Darwin Fox that was uncovered from the Isle of Wight. He renamed the species C. Cuvieri, having sought to synonymize the names C. Parisiensis and C. Gypsorum. He suggested that some of the traits of Choeropotamus were similar to suines but that some others were more convergent with carnivorans. In an 1839–1864 osteography, the French naturalist Henri Marie Ducrotay de Blainville prioritized the name C. parisiensis for the first recognized species.

In an 1848–1852 work, French palaeontologist Paul Gervais erected C. affinis based on a partial lower jaw with three molars that was found in the French locality of La Débruge. French naturalist Jean-Baptiste Noulet erected C. lautricensis in 1870, naming the species after the French commune of Lautrec. He specified that the lower jaw specimens were found from a rich fossil deposit in Castres accidentally discovered at a railway project from Castres to Albi and that C. lautricensis was half the size of C. parisiensis. In addition, he did a brief review of some of the previously named species, considering C. parisiensis and C. affinis to be valid and accepting that the two species, C. Sömmeringii and C. Meissneri were reassigned to Hyotherium. The same year, German palaeontologist Oscar Fraas recognized another species named C. steinheimensis, its fossils having been found in the German municipality of Steinheim am Albuch. While British palaeontologist Richard Lydekker in 1885 listed C. cuvieri, C. parisiensis, and C. affinis as synonyms of C. gypsorum and suggested that C. steinheimensis belonged to Hyotherium, Karl Alfred von Zittel in a 1891-1893 handbook suggested that both C. parisiensis and C. affinis were valid species.

==== Later history ====
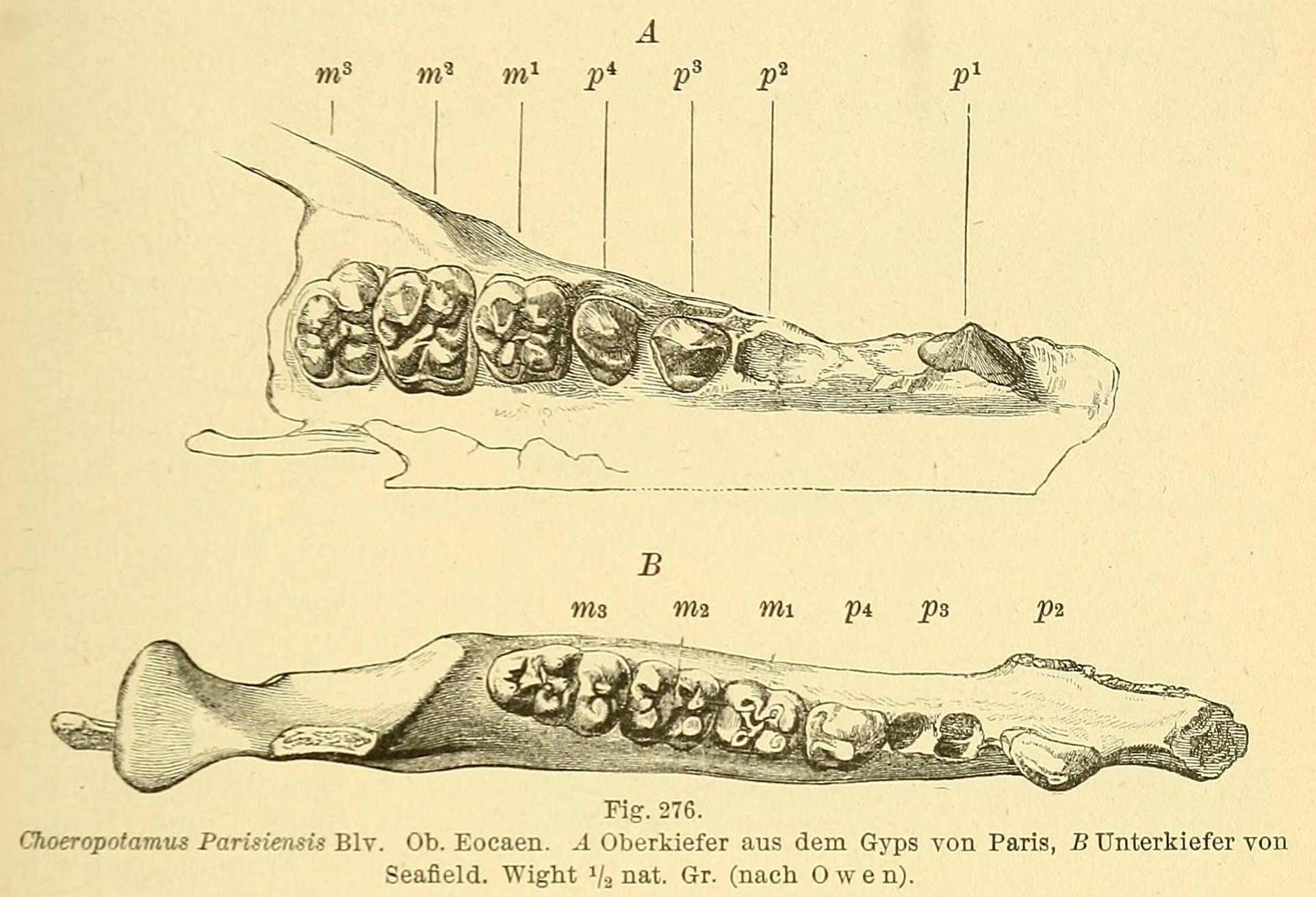
Illustrations of the upper and lower dentitions of C. parisiensis with labels, 1891–1893

In 1908, Swiss palaeontologist Hans Georg Stehlin confirmed the validities of C. parisiensis, C. affinis, and C. lautricensis in his review of Choeropotamus. He also erected C. Depéreti, which he said was based on a mandibular fragment from a Basel collection that was originally uncovered from the French commune of Saint-Hippolyte-de-Caton. He additionally provisionally recognized C. parisiensis var. minor, named for a small-sized mandible from a gypsum in the French commune of Argenteuil. Stehlin also stated that it was intermediate in size between the small-sized C. lautricensis and the larger C. affinis and C. parisiensis. French palaeontologist Charles Depéret in 1917 listed a species variation named C. lautricensis mut. major without further elaboration. In 1930, American zoologist Glover M. Allen designated C. matritensis as both a nomen nudum (inadequately defined name) and a synonym of C. affinis.

In 1975, Spanish palaeontologist María Lourdes Casanovas Cladellas explained in her thesis that C. lautricensis mut. major was applied to an upper jaw and a left hemimandible, both of which were found in the French locality of Robiac. In both her thesis and research paper, she recognized the new species C. sudrei based on multiple mandible fragments from the Spanish locality of Roc de Santa 1; the species was named after French palaeontologist Jean Sudre. "C." steinheimensis was eventually reclassified and moved to the genus Parachleuastochoerus, first recognized in the 20th century.

=== Classification ===
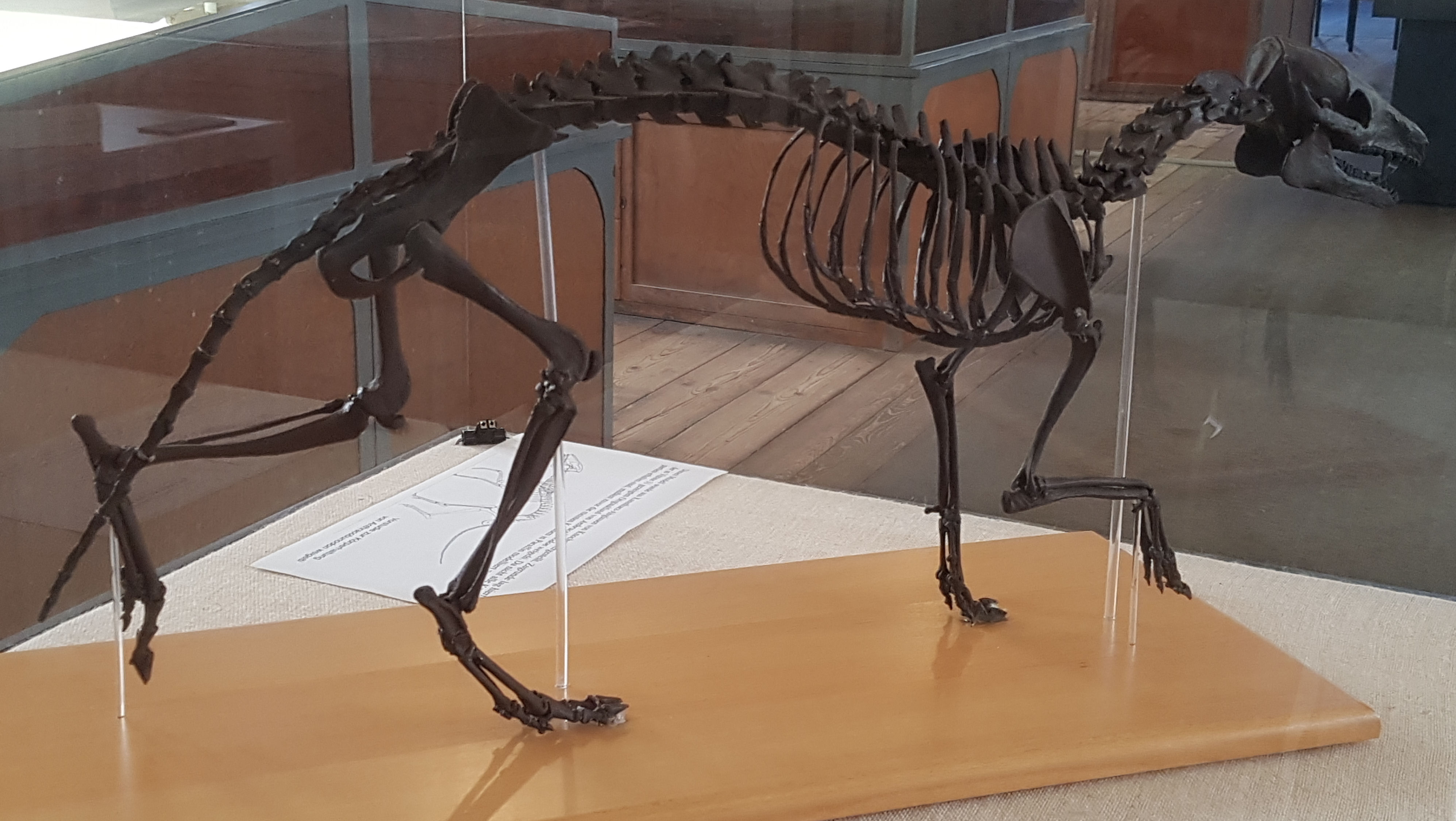
Reconstructed skeleton of Amphirhagatherium, an endemic European artiodactyl genus classified within the Choeropotamidae. The polyphyletic nature of the Choeropotamidae makes the placements of its genera uncertain and inadequately defined.

Choeropotamus is the type genus of the Choeropotamidae, a Palaeogene artiodactyl family endemic to western Europe that lived from the Middle Eocene to the Early Oligocene. Choeropotamidae had a particularly complicated taxonomic history, as many genera now classified in the family, other than Choeropotamus, were not originally recognized as such in the 20th century. In particular, many genera like Haplobunodon, Lophiobunodon, and Rhagatherium were classified in a separate family called the "Haplobunodontidae." As a result, Choeropotamidae had, by some sources, been considered a monotypic family, meaning that Choeropotamus was the only genus classified in it. However, the Haplobunodontidae was synonymized with Choerpotamidae by later taxonomists, though other authors have suggested that the Haplobunodontidae should be revived due to questions relating to the polyphyly (lacking in relations from closest ancestors) of the Choeropotamidae.

The Choeropotamidae as currently defined is polyphyletic; cladistic analyses of "choeropotamids" based on dental anatomy reveals that not all genera share close synapomorphies (or traits of the latest common ancestor) to prove close relations between them. However, disagreements remain on whether or not Haplobunodon lies within the Choeropotamidae sensu stricto (in a strict sense) to justify a separate Haplobunodontidae family. Because the current definition of the Choeropotamidae is polyphyletic and not agreed upon, the Choeropotamidae requires further analyses.

Regardless of taxonomic problems, the Choeropotamidae has been well-defined as one of the endemic European Palaeogene artiodactyl groups that lived primarily during the Eocene but extended up to the earliest Oligocene. Masillabune, arguably the oldest choeropotamid, first appeared during the unit MP11 of the Mammal Paleogene zones. It was followed by the likes of Haplobunodon and Amphirhagatherium in MP12 and Hallebune in MP13. Two of the latest-appearing choeropotamids, Choeropotamus and Thaumastognathus, made their first appearances in MP16. Both Choeropotamus and Amphirhagatherium, the latest-surviving choeropotamids, extended up to MP20, coinciding with the Grande Coupure extinction event in western Europe. They are generally regarded as close relatives of the Cebochoeridae, another endemic European artiodactyl family. One phylogenetic tree example of the Choeropotamidae and Haplobunodontidae being defined as separate families according to Vincent Luccisano et al. in 2020 is shown below:

- Artiodactyla
  - Bunophorus
  - - Gunophorus
    - Diacodexis
  - - - Protodichobune
      - Eurodexis
    - - - Buxobune
        - - Mouillacitherium
          - Meniscodon
        - - - Hyperdichobune
            - - Dichobune robertiana
              - - Dichobune leporina
                - - Homacodon
                  - - Gobiohyus
                    - Suina
                      - - Khirtharia
                        - Entelodon
                      - - Palaeocheorus
                        - Perchoerus
          - - Haplobunodontidae
              - Haplobunodon
              - - Cuisitherium
                - Lophiobunodon
            - - Mixtotherium
              - - Robiacina
                - - - - Dacrytherium
                      - Diplobune
                    - - Xiphodon
                      - Paraxiphodon
                  - - - Cainotherium
                      - Paroxacron
                    - - Archaeomeryx
                      - - Amphimeryx
                        - Pseudamphimeryx
      - - Aumelasia
        - - - Hallebune
            - Amphirhagatherium
          - - Cebochoeridae
              - Cebochoerus
              - Gervachoerus
            - - Choeropotamus
              - Siamotherium

In 2022, Weppe conducted a phylogenetic analysis in his academic thesis regarding Palaeogene artiodactyl lineages, focusing most specifically on the endemic European families. One monophyletic set consisted of the Dichobuninae, Cebochoeridae, and two clades of the polyphyletic Choeropotamidae. He suggested that Cuisitherium and Lophiobunodon were not very closely related to the true clade of choeropotamids, consisting of Thaumastognathus, Choeropotamus, Amphirhagatherium, Rhagatherium, and the polyphyletic Haplobunodon; his analysis disagrees with other sources suggesting that some genera like Haplobunodon were not closely related to Choeropotamus and states that the Haplobunodontidae is therefore not valid. More specifically, he defined Thaumastognathus, Choeropotamus, Haplobunodon lydekkeri, and "H." solodurense as forming one specific clade of the Choeropotamidae sensu stricto.

All five Choeropotamus species are part of a singular lineage of anagenesis, in part proven by the addition of cuspules (or small cusps) in later species and the lack of temporal overlap between the species. C. lautricensis was the earliest species of Choeropotamus and was followed evolutionarily by C. sudrei, C. depereti, C. affinis, and finally C. parisiensis.

== Description ==
=== Skull ===
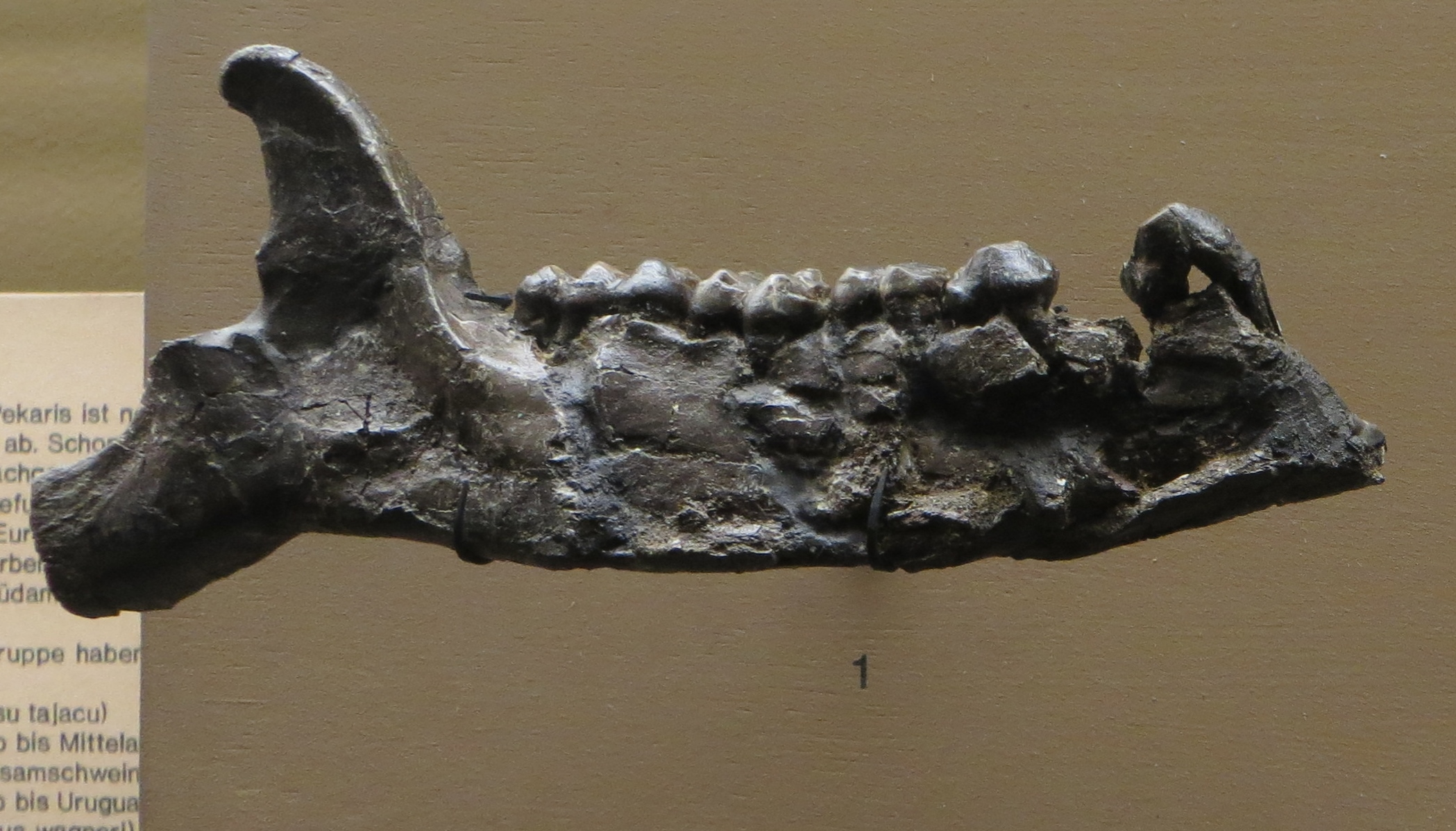
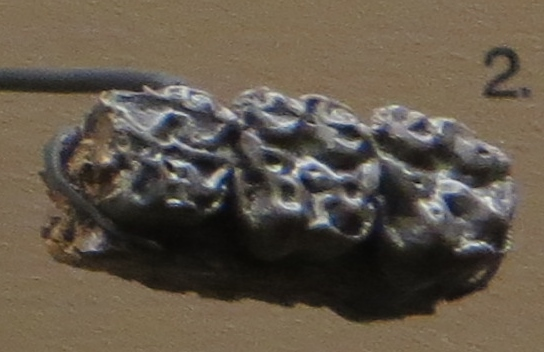
C. affinis mandible (left) and C. depereti dentition (right), Natural History Museum of Basel

The skull of Choeropotamus is elongated but low and broad, its snout and zygomatic arches being narrow with sideway projections and its crest on the parietal bone being very high. The neurocranium is elongated, and the mastoid part of the temporal bone is amastoid, or lacking a surface exposure. The amastoid trait is evolutionarily derived in relation to the mastoid trait of Haplobunodon in which the mastoid part has a surface exposure (making the skull "mastoid"). The postglenoid process, found on the temporal bone, is separated from a different post-tympanic process, the latter of which the paroccipital process projects far behind. The projection of the paroccipital process contrasts with the Anthracotheriidae, in which the process is attached to the post-tympanic process.

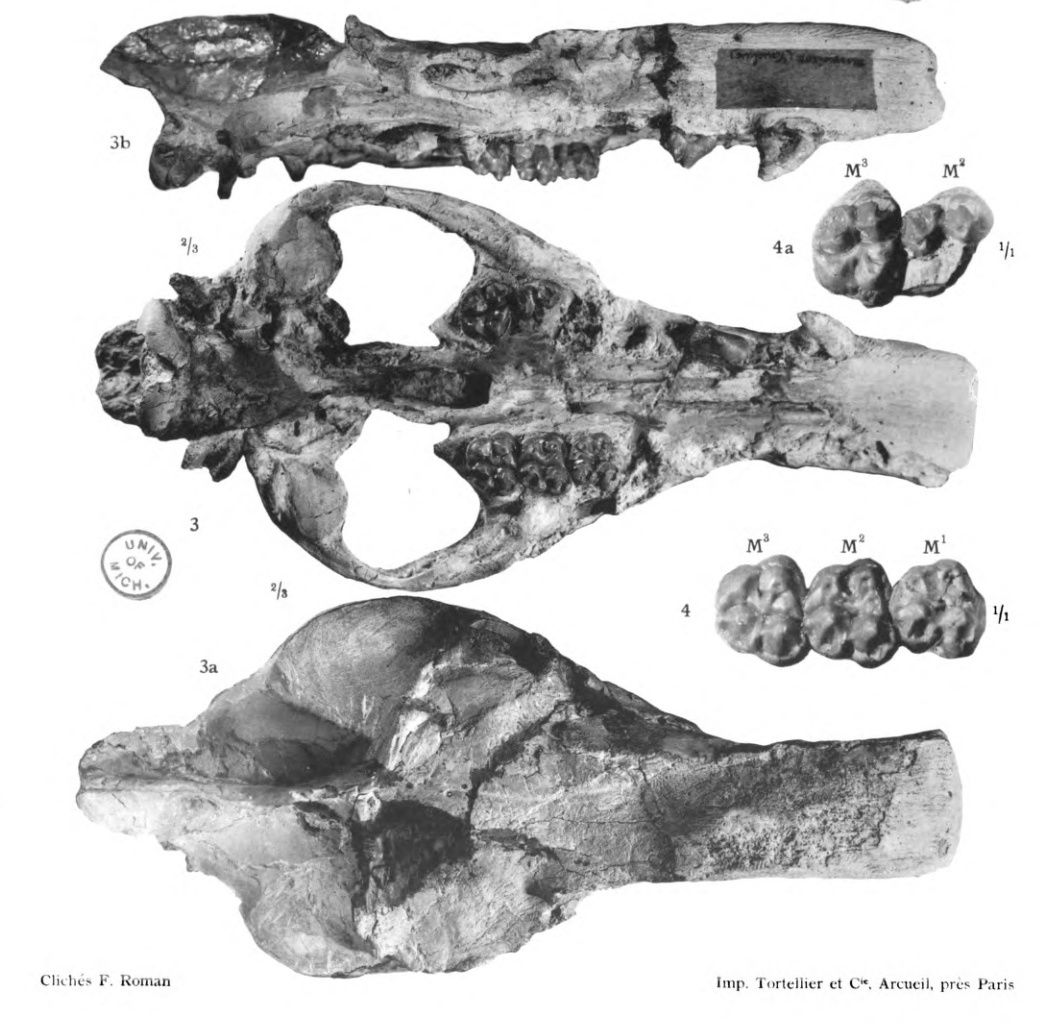
C. affinis skull and dentition from Mormoiron

In addition to cranial material from Montmartre, Choeropotamus is also known from a complete but crushed skull from the gypsum deposits of Mormoiron in France assigned to C. affinis and first described in 1922. The skull is noted for its elongation, its front portion narrowing. At the position of M^{1} (the first upper molar), the skull suddenly widens to the front part of the orbit. Although the orbit has been crushed, Austrian geologist Frédéric Roman suggested that it must have been wide. There are two strong and very wide ridges that are behind the orbit, border the fronts of the temporal fossae, and converge at the skull's middle. At the area where the two ridges connect, the skull rises, revealing a very strong sagittal crest, which then stops at the occipital crest. The back of the skull has a more triangular shape, is very small, and has a rounded upper angle. The occipital condyles are oval-shaped and are next to the transverse foramen magnum, itself taller than wide. The palate bone, like in suids, is narrow and elongated. The nasal cavities are bordered by prominent ridges and are both elongated and wide, its front end reaching between M^{2} and M^{3}. The mandibular fossa is circular, flattened, and very wide, bordering a thick and low transverse eminence. The temporal styloid processes are poorly developed compared to in suids but are much larger than in peccaries. The processes appear slightly flattened transversely and lean slightly backwards, their tips curving slightly forward.

The mandible is both narrow and elongated, the angle of the mandible being prominent. The ascending ramus of the mandible is low but relatively vertical and very wide. The mandibular symphysis is lengthy, extending all the way back to the area of P_{2} or P_{3} (bottom second or third premolars). The anatomy of the raoellid Khirtharia inflata has been recorded as similar to Choeropotamus in part due to the similar mandible shapes, such as the well-developed angular region and non-straight lower edge.

=== Dentition ===
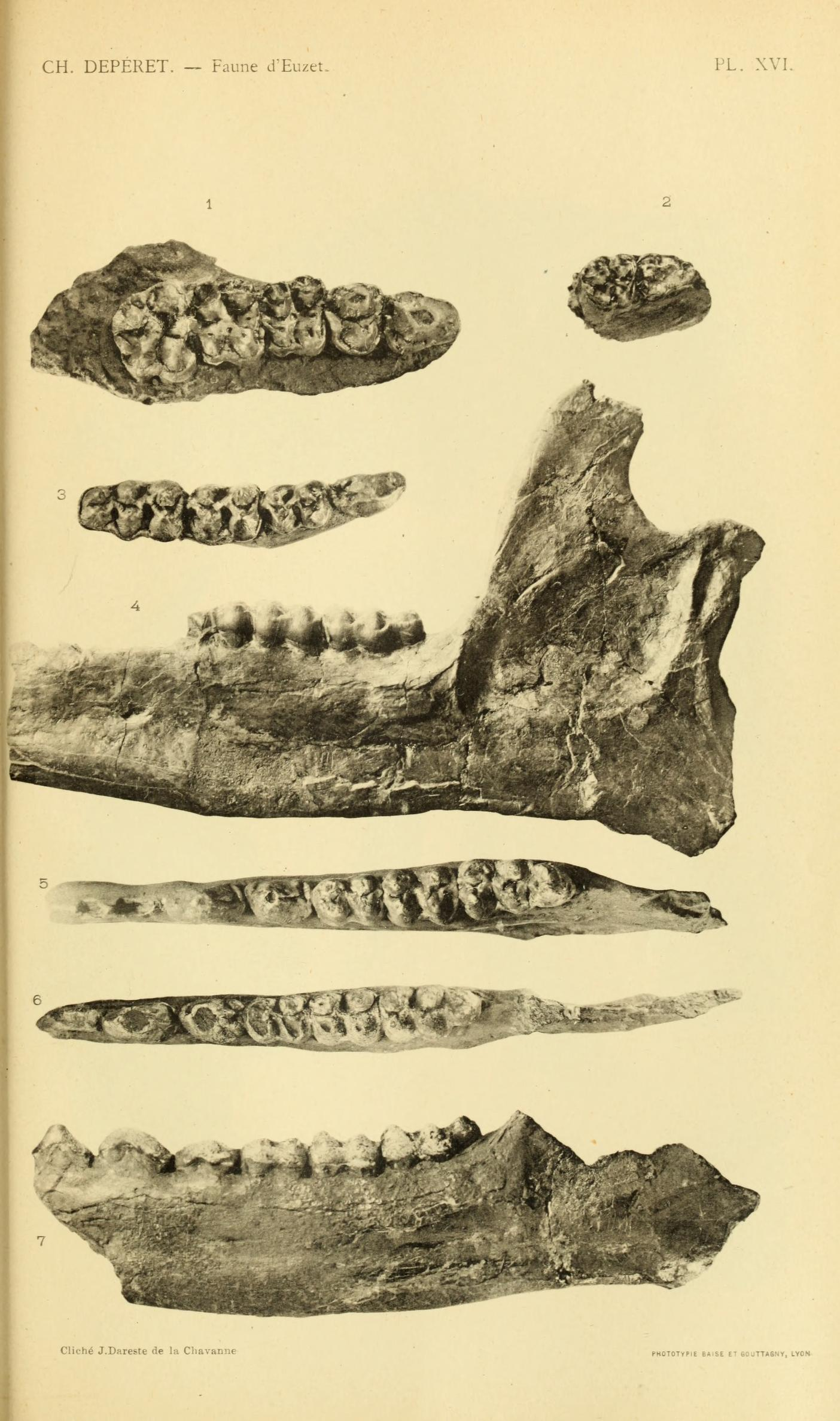
Image of the right maxilla (fig. 1–2) and left mandible (fig. 3–7) of C. depereti

Choeropotamus was originally described as having an incomplete lower dental set in comparison to its upper counterpart, the P_{1} (first lower premolar (P/p)) likely being the tooth that was evolutionarily lost. Thus, its dental formula was originally defined as 3.1.4.33.1.3.3 for a total of 42 teeth. However, Jerry J. Hooker and Marc Weidmann pointed out that the enlarged tooth that was separated from P_{2} was misinterpreted by some authors like Jean Viret and Sudre as a canine (C/c). Instead, as Stehlin in 1908 suggested, the enlarged tooth was actually P_{1}, evident by a C. affinis fossil from La Débruge that has four equal-sized dental alveoli for the canines and three incisors (I/i) that were in front of the P_{1} tooth. Therefore, it has the complete dental formula of 3.1.4.33.1.4.3 for a total of 44 teeth, consistent with the primitive dental formula for early-middle Palaeogene placental mammals. The dental anatomy of primitive Choeropotamus species is best represented by C. depereti, but the derived C. affinis and C. parisiensis remain the best-known species in terms of such.

The premolars and molars (M/m) possessed strong cingula. The incisors (I/i) have a diminished form and are shaped upright, the first incisors being caniniform (canine-shaped). The upper canine (C/c) is vertical, compressed, and is sharp at its rear, forming a dagger-like shape. The lower canine in comparison is incisiform (incisor-shaped). P^{1} is separated from P^{2} by a diastema. P^{2} is slightly more elongated than P^{3}, which is triangular, has a simple form consisting of a single tubercle (or cusp), and lacks a protocone cusp. P^{4} has a metacone cusp on the short postprotocrista ridge. P_{1} is caniniform and is separated from P_{2} by a long diastema. P_{2} and P_{3} are both one-cusped and compressed in shape, whereas P_{4} can be one-cusped or two-cusped. The upper molars, shaped similarly to those of anthracotheres in their lowness and bunodont (low and rounded) cusps, increase in size from the first to third upper molars. More derived species have an accessory cusp that appears in the tooth's centre. The lower molars are elongated and have bunodont internal cusps along with external cusps that have V-shaped crests. M_{3} has two main cusps on the hypoconulid lobe. Choeropotamus has been compared to the cebochoerid Cebochoerus due to their shared caniniform first incisors, dagger-shaped upper canines, and incisiform lower canines. C. sudrei enamel was characterised by anastomosis in the Hunter-Schreger bands, which were well defined and had a straight orientation with a transverse configuration.

Both Choeropotamus and its relative Thaumastognathus have long diastemata and caniniform P_{1} teeth. The dentition of Choeropotamus had been compared to other artiodactyls such as "Haplobunodon" solodurense and the Anthracotheriidae due to similarities in molar morphology, seemingly the result of parallel evolution. Both Khirtharia inflata and Choeropotamus have been compared in dental anatomy due to the presence of diastemata in between their premolars, but the former has more bunodont dentition than C. lautricensis and C. depereti and has similarly bunodonty to that of C. parisiensis. However, the evolutionary relation of Choeropotamus to Palaeogene artiodactyls endemic to Asia remain uncertain, the similarity of the former to other artiodactyls like Khirtharia probably being a case of parallel evolution.

=== Postcranial skeleton ===
In terms of postcranial remains, Choeropotamus is only known from leg bone remains like the astragalus. Such remains were first by Depéret in 1917, who attributed an astragalus and calcaneum to C. depereti. However, in 1947, Jean Viret and J. Prudant stated that the astragalus originally attributed to Choeropotamus actually belonging to Dacrytherium while the astragalus assigned initially to the latter actually belonging to the former. The calcaneum attributed to Choeropotamus has been described as being similar to those of the pig Sus and the anthracotheres Anthracotherium and Brachyodus, differing by the more compressed transverse surface and the articular surface for the fibula being narrower and more elongated; this suggests that at least the lower end of the fibula was proportionally large. The astragalus has a trochleated (pulley-like) and slightly bent head along with a distally (situated away from the center) extensive sustentacular facet. Depéret described it as being narrow plus slender in shape similar to those of the anthracothere Elomeryx and the wild boar (Sus scrofa).

=== Size ===
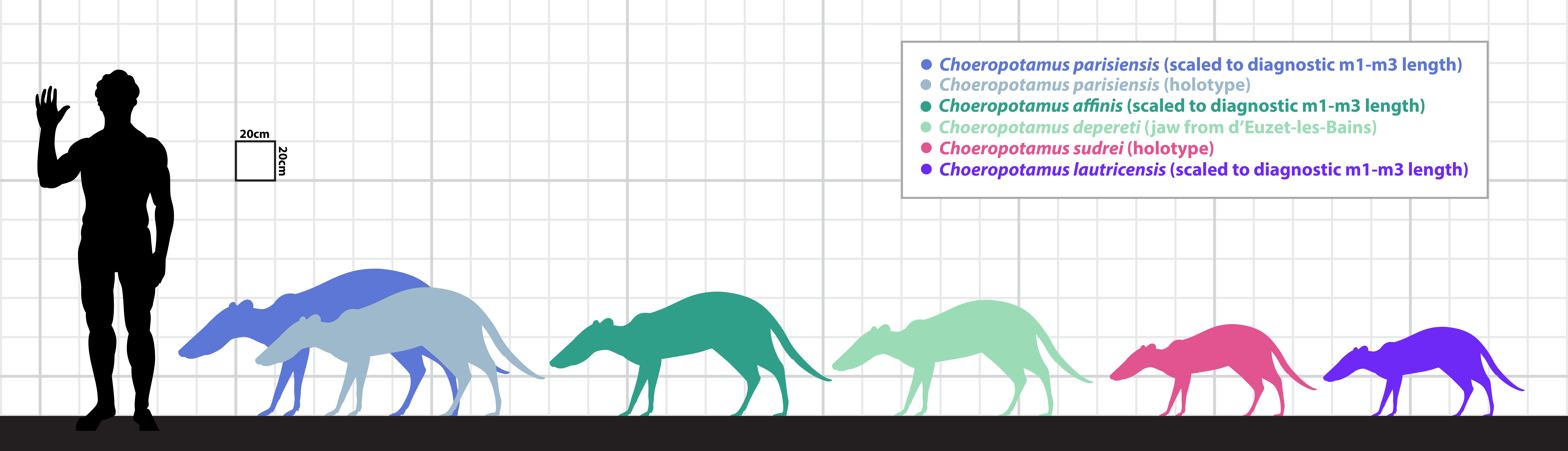
Estimated size comparison of all Choeropotamus species based on known fossil remains

The species of Choeropotamus are described as medium to large in size, the genus being one of the larger representatives of its family. Choeropotamus could have been about the size of a domestic pig. The linear evolutionary stage, beginning from C. lautricensis and ending up to C. parisiensis, shows a progressive increase in size. For C. lautricensis, the length of M^{1}-M^{3} is 30 mm (1.2 in) while that of M_{1}-M_{3} ranges from 28 mm (1.1 in) to 33 mm (1.3 in). The second earliest species C. sudrei has M^{1}-M^{3} and M_{1}-M_{3} lengths that measure 31 mm (1.2 in) and 33.5 mm (1.32 in), respectively. The M^{1}-M^{3} of C. depereti ranges in length from 33 mm (1.3 in) to 36 mm (1.4 in) while its M_{1}-M_{3} ranges from 38 mm (1.5 in) to 45 mm (1.8 in). The M^{1}-M^{3} length of the second-latest species C. affinis ranged from 42 mm (1.7 in) to 46 mm (1.8 in), and its M_{1}-M_{3} length is 54 mm (2.1 in). As for the latest species C. parisiensis, its M^{1}-M^{3} and M_{1}-M_{3} dental rows measured 52 mm (2.0 in) and 62 mm (2.4 in) long, respectively. An M_{2} of C. parisiensis individually measures 14 mm (0.55 in) long.

The estimated body mass of C. parisiensis has been calculated by Helder Gomes Rodrigues et al. in 2019 based on an astragalus from the National Museum of Natural History, France that measured 40 mm (1.6 in) long and 19 mm (0.75 in) wide, yielding a weight of 58.8 kg (130 lb). The body mass formula based on astragali was previously established by Jean-Noël Martinez and Sudre in 1995 for Palaeogene artiodactyls, although Choeropotamus was not included in the initial study.

== Palaeobiology ==
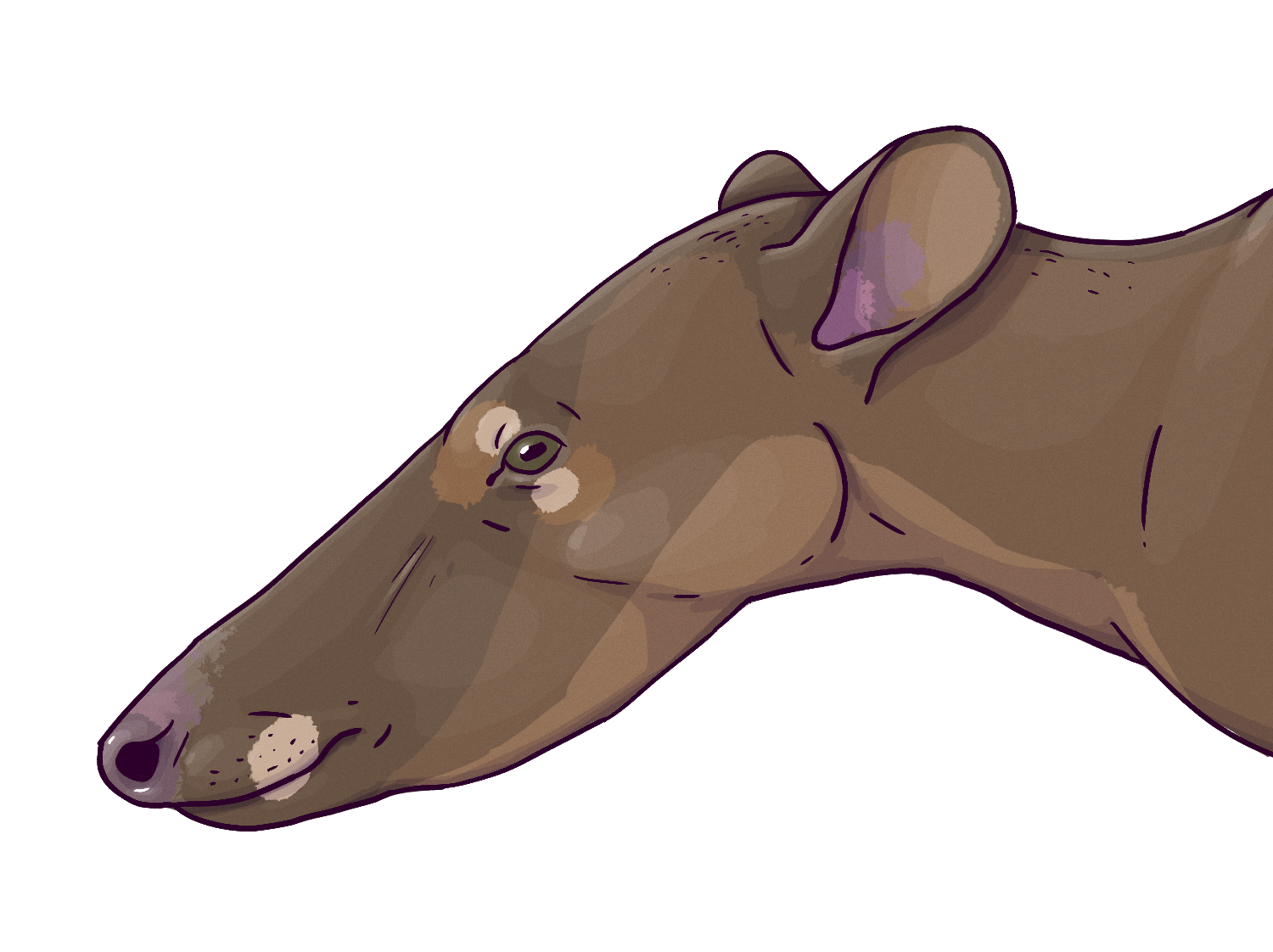
Life restoration of the head of C. parisiensis

Choeropotamids are among the early artiodactyls that have brachyodont (low-crowned) and bunodont cheek teeth, suggesting that they had either frugivorous or omnivorous diets. Choeropotamus specifically is a large-sized bunodont artiodactyl of western Europe that had elongated skulls, long diastemata, caniniform P_{1} teeth, and molars with additional cusps. Given that the molars were used to grind food, Choeropotamus could have possibly been an "unspecialized" omnivore. Jörg Erfurt and Grégoire Métais also suggested the possibility that choeropotamids probably had robust limbs.

The sharp anterior teeth on choeropotamids like Choeropotamus infers occasional carnivorous dietary habits and/or sparring in intraspecific competition. The possibility of Choeropotamus feeding on hard fruits is supported by the thick enamel on its teeth like in similar modern mammals. The feeding behaviours would have differed from other purported choeropotamids like Amphirhagatherium, which would have been a ground feeder of fruits and leaves, and Masillabune, which based on gut contents consumed plants of the family Lauraceae and other unidentified plants. Weppe in his thesis proposed his hypothesis in which the cranial and dental morphologies of Choeropotamus, comparable to members of the Hippopotamoidea (i.e. their diastemata and incisors), could possibly point to more semi-aquatic behaviours of the former just like with behaviours of some members of the latter.

== Palaeoecology ==
=== Middle Eocene ===
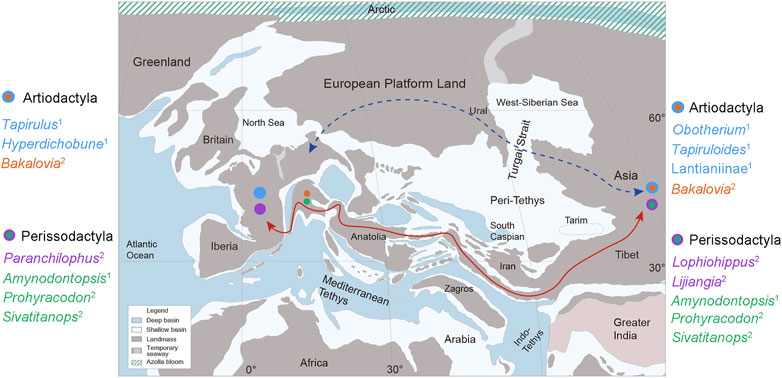
Palaeogeography of Europe and Asia during the Middle Eocene with possible artiodactyl and perissodactyl dispersal routes.

For much of the Eocene, a hothouse climate with humid, tropical environments with consistently high precipitations prevailed. Modern mammalian orders including the Perissodactyla, Artiodactyla, and Primates (or the suborder Euprimates) appeared already by the Early Eocene, diversifying rapidly and developing dentitions specialized for folivory. The omnivorous forms mostly either switched to folivorous diets or went extinct by the Middle Eocene (47–37 Ma) along with the archaic "condylarths". By the Late Eocene (approx. 37–33 mya), most of the ungulate form dentitions shifted from bunodont (or rounded) cusps to cutting ridges (i.e. lophs) for folivorous diets.

Land connections between western Europe and North America were interrupted around 53 Ma. From the Early Eocene up until the Grande Coupure extinction event (56–33.9 mya), western Eurasia was separated into three landmasses: western Europe (an archipelago), Balkanatolia (in-between the Paratethys Sea of the north and the Neotethys Ocean of the south), and eastern Eurasia. The Holarctic mammalian faunas of western Europe were therefore mostly isolated from other landmasses including Greenland, Africa, and eastern Eurasia, allowing for endemism to develop. Therefore, the European mammals of the Late Eocene (MP17–MP20 of the Mammal Palaeogene zones) were mostly descendants of endemic Middle Eocene groups.

The five known species of Choeropotamus form a single successive evolutionary line beginning with C. lautricensis, which is exclusive to MP16 based on its appearances in the contemporary localities of Le Castrais and Robiac. By then, it would have coexisted with perissodactyls (Palaeotheriidae, Lophiodontidae, and Hyrachyidae), non-endemic artiodactyls (Dichobunidae and Tapirulidae), endemic European artiodactyls (Choeropotamidae, Cebochoeridae, Mixtotheriidae, Anoplotheriidae, Amphimerycidae, and Xiphodontidae), and primates (Adapidae, Omomyidae). It also cooccurred with metatherians (Herpetotheriidae), rodents (Ischyromyidae, Theridomyoidea, Gliridae), eulipotyphlans, bats, apatotherians, carnivoraformes (Miacidae), and hyaenodonts (Hyainailourinae, Proviverrinae).

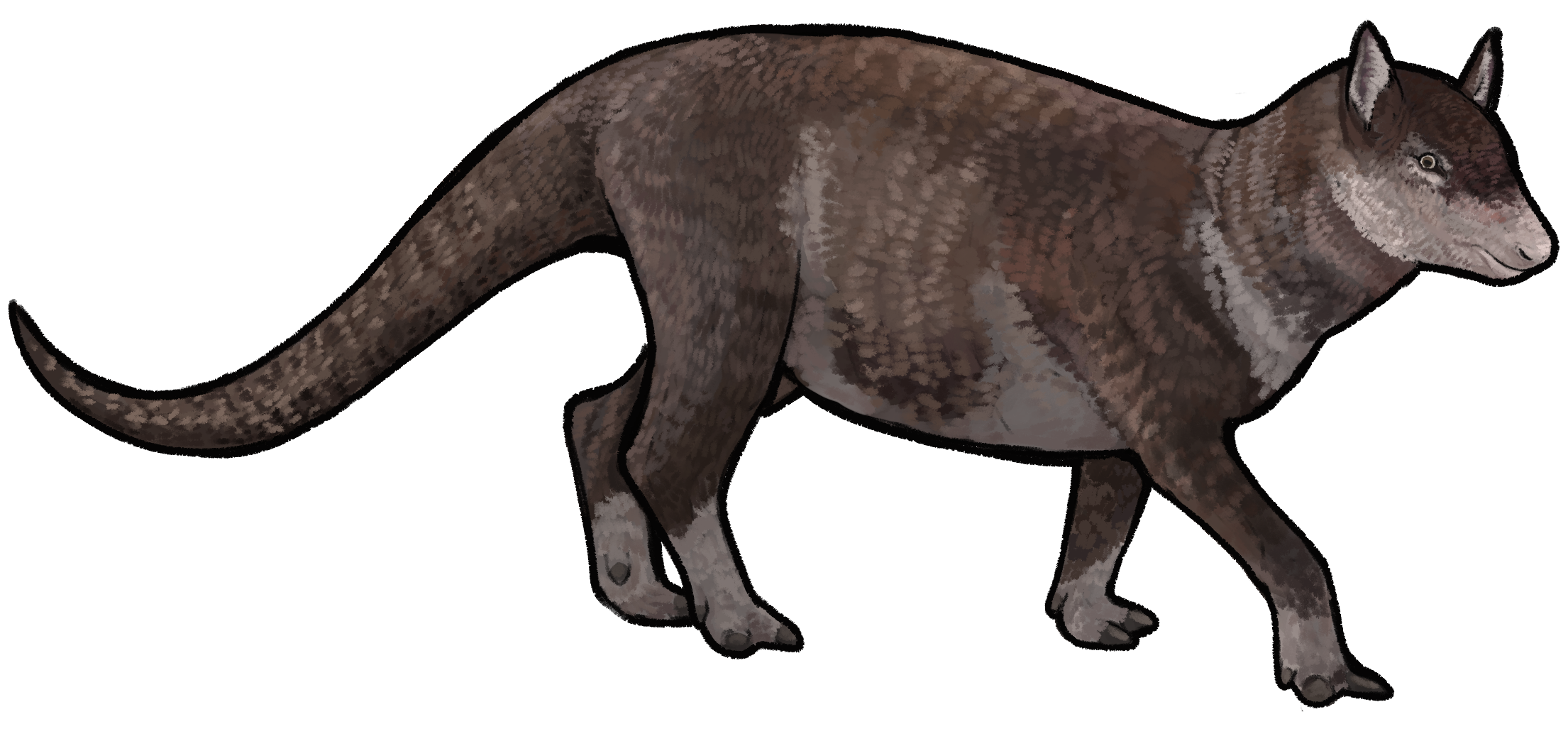
Restoration of Acotherulum, a contemporary artiodactyl that would have coexisted with Choeropotamus in the Middle and Late Eocene

Other fossil mammals found from the deposits of Robiac include the herpetotheriids Amphiperatherium and Peratherium, apatemyid Heterohyus, nyctithere Saturninia, omomyids (Necrolemur, Pseudoloris, and Microchoerus), adapid Adapis, ischyromyid Ailuravus, glirid Glamys, pseudosciurid Sciuroides, theridomyids Elfomys and Pseudoltinomys, hyaenodonts (Paracynohyaenodon, Paroxyaena, and Cynohyaenodon), carnivoraformes (Simamphicyon, Quercygale, and Paramiacis), cebochoerids Cebochoerus and Acotherulum, choeropotamid Haplobunodon, tapirulid Tapirulus, anoplotheriids Dacrytherium, Catodontherium, and Robiatherium, dichobunid Mouillacitherium, robiacinid Robiacina, xiphodonts (Xiphodon, Dichodon, Haplomeryx), amphimerycid Pseudamphimeryx, lophiodont Lophiodon, hyrachyid Chasmotherium, and palaeotheres (Palaeotherium, Plagiolophus, Leptolophus, Anchilophus, Metanchilophus, Lophiotherium, Pachynolophus, Eurohippus).

By MP16, a faunal turnover occurred, marking the disappearances of the lophiodonts and European hyrachyids as well as the extinctions of all European crocodylomorphs except for the alligatoroid Diplocynodon. The causes of the faunal turnover have been attributed to a shift from humid and highly tropical environments to drier and more temperate forests with open areas and more abrasive vegetation. The surviving herbivorous faunas shifted their dentitions and dietary strategies accordingly to adapt to abrasive and seasonal vegetation. Despite the turnover, the environments still consisted of subhumid, subtropical evergreen forests. The Palaeotheriidae was the sole remaining European perissodactyl group, and frugivorous-folivorous or purely folivorous artiodactyls became the dominant group in western Europe.

=== Late Eocene ===
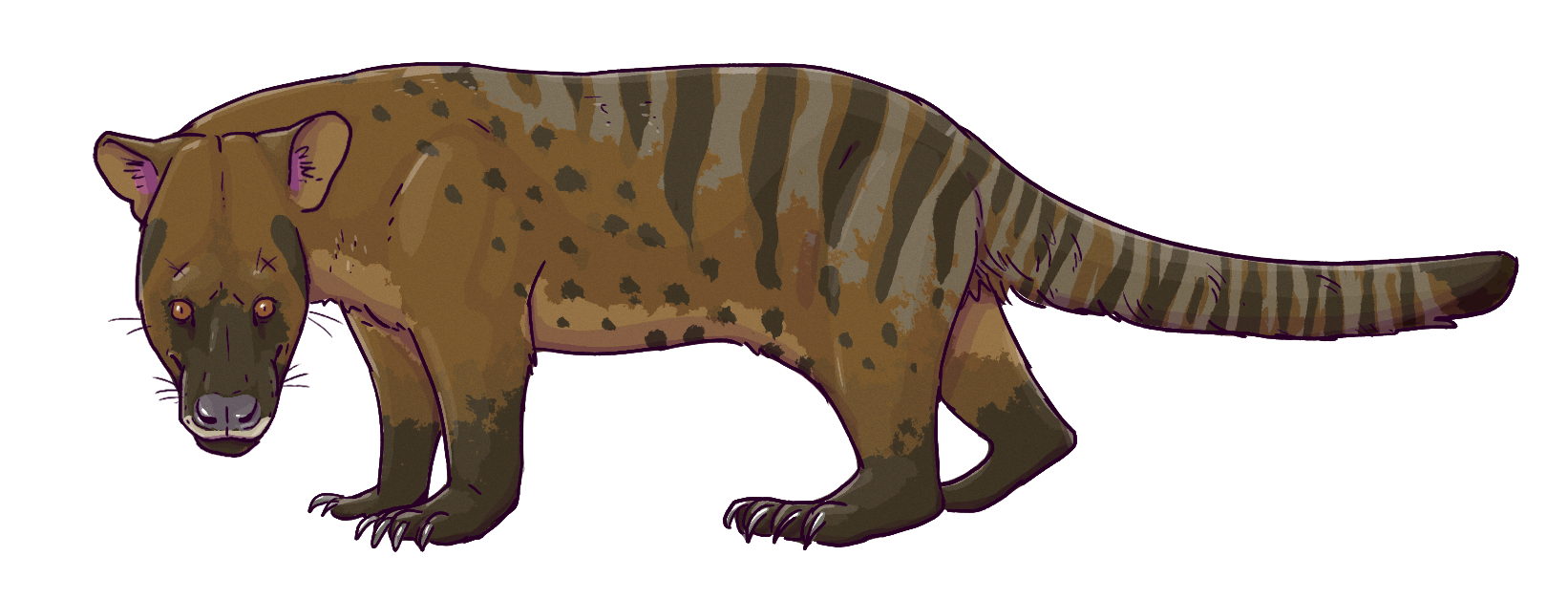
Restoration of Pterodon, which appeared in the Late Eocene and coexisted with later Choeropotamus species

Two species of Choeropotamus made their appearances in the Late Eocene: C. sudrei and C. depereti, the latter arguably descending from the former. Whereas C. sudrei is exclusively recorded from MP17a localities, C. depereti is recorded from both MP17a and MP17b, and the two do not overlap in their fossil localities. Choeropotamus in the Late Eocene largely coexisted with the same artiodactyl families as well as the Palaeotheriidae within western Europe, although the Cainotheriidae and the derived anoplotheriids Anoplotherium and Diplobune all made their first fossil record appearances by MP18. In addition, several migrant mammal groups had reached western Europe by MP17a-MP18, namely the Anthracotheriidae, Hyaenodontinae, and Amphicyonidae. In addition to snakes, frogs, and salamandrids, rich assemblage of lizards are known in western Europe as well from MP16-MP20, representing the Iguanidae, Lacertidae, Gekkonidae, Agamidae, Scincidae, Helodermatidae, and Varanoidea, most of which were able to thrive in the warm climate of western Europe.

Other mammals found in the MP17a locality of Fons 4 with C. sudrei include the herpetotheriids Amphiperatherium and Peratherium, glirid Glamys, theridomyids (Paradelomys, Theridomys, Estellomys, Elfomys, Remys), pseudosciurid Treposciurus, omomyid Necrolemur, adapid Leptadapis, hyaenodont Hyaenodon, palaeotheres (Anchilophus, Pachynolophus, Plagiolophus, Palaeotherium), dichobunid Mouillacitherium, amphimerycid Pseudamphimeryx, cebochoerid Cebochoerus, anoplotheriid Dacrytherium, and xiphodonts (Xiphodon, Dichodon, Haplomeryx, Paraxiphodon).

The last two species of Choeropotamus to have made their appearances were C. affinis at MP18 and its descendent C. parisiensis at MP18, MP19, and MP20, the two species only overlapping at the MP18 locality of La Débruge. At the MP20 locality of Saint-Capraise-d'Eymet, fossils of C. parisiensis have been found along with those of the theridomyid Patriotheridomys, hyainailourid Pterodon, palaeotheres Plagiolophus and Palaeotherium, anoplotheriids Anoplotherium and Diplobune, xiphodont Xiphodon, and the gelocid Paragelocus.

== Extinction ==
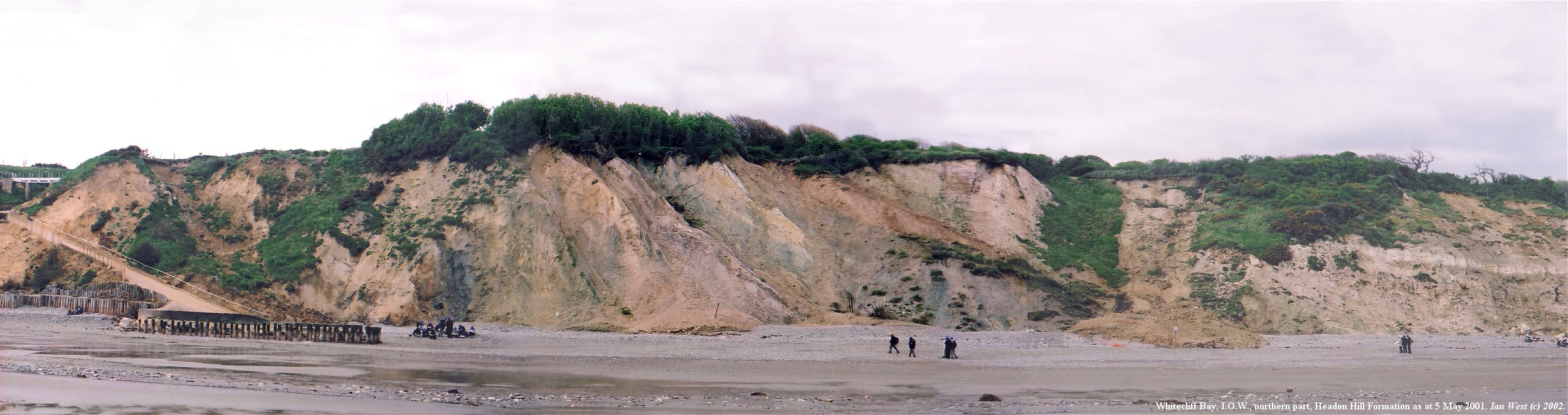
A panorama of the Headon Hill Formation in the Isle of Wight. The stratigraphy of both it and the Bouldnor Formation led to better understandings of faunal chronologies from the Late Eocene up to the Grande Coupure.

The Grande Coupure event during the latest Eocene to earliest Oligocene (MP20-MP21) is one of the largest and most abrupt faunal turnovers in the Cenozoic of Western Europe and coincident with climate forcing events of cooler and more seasonal climates. The event led to the extinction of 60% of western European mammalian lineages, which were subsequently replaced by Asian immigrants. The Grande Coupure is often dated directly to the Eocene-Oligocene boundary at 33.9 Ma, although some estimate that the event began slightly later, at 33.6–33.4 mya. The event occurred during or after the Eocene-Oligocene transition, an abrupt shift from a hot greenhouse world that characterised much of the Palaeogene to a coolhouse/icehouse world from the Early Oligocene onwards. The massive drop in temperatures results from the first major expansion of the Antarctic ice sheets that caused drastic pCO_{2} decreases and an estimated drop of ~70 m (230 ft) in sea level.

Many palaeontologists agree that glaciation and the resulting drops in sea level allowed for increased migrations between Balkanatolia and western Europe. The Turgai Strait, which once separated much of Europe from Asia, is often proposed as the main European seaway barrier prior to the Grande Coupure, but some researchers challenged this perception, arguing that it completely receded already by 37 Ma, long before the Eocene-Oligocene transition. In 2022, Alexis Licht et al. suggested that the Grande Coupure could have possibly been synchronous with the Oi-1 glaciation (33.5 Ma), which records a decline in atmospheric CO_{2}, boosting the Antarctic glaciation that already started by the Eocene-Oligocene transition.

The Grande Coupure event also marked a large faunal turnover marking the arrivals of later anthracotheres, entelodonts, ruminants (Gelocidae, Lophiomerycidae), rhinocerotoids (Rhinocerotidae, Amynodontidae, Eggysodontidae), carnivorans (later Amphicyonidae, Amphicynodontidae, Nimravidae, and Ursidae), eastern Eurasian rodents (Eomyidae, Cricetidae, and Castoridae), and eulipotyphlans (Erinaceidae).

While the presence of Amphirhagatherium in the German locality of Bohnerz and the British Bouldnor Formation may infer possible survival of the Choeropotamidae at MP21, the latest-surviving Choeropotamus species, C. parisiensis, is not recorded from any site that may overlap with the MP21 unit. Many other artiodactyl genera from western Europe disappeared also as a result of the Grande Coupure extinction event. The extinctions of Choeropotamus and many other mammals have been attributed to negative interactions with immigrant faunas (competition, predations), environmental changes from cooling climates, or some combination of the two.
