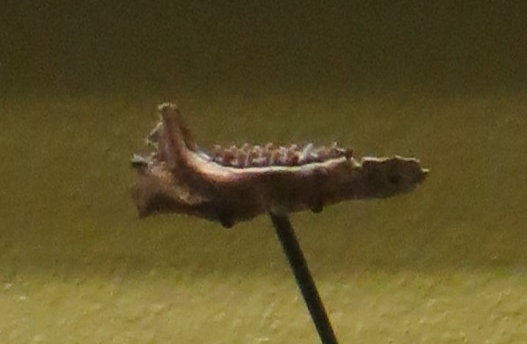
- Pseudamphimeryx renevieri mandible, Natural History Museum of Basel

Scientific classification
- Kingdom: Animalia
- Phylum: Chordata
- Class: Mammalia
- Order: Artiodactyla
- Family: †Amphimerycidae
- Genus: †Pseudamphimeryx; Stehlin, 1910

Type species
- †Pseudamphimeryx renevieri Pictet & Humbert, 1869

Other species
- †P. schlosseri Ruetimeyer, 1891; †P. valdensis? Stehlin, 1910; †P. pavloviae Stehlin, 1910; †P. hantonensis Forster-Cooper, 1928; †P. salesmei Sudre, 1978

= Pseudamphimeryx =

Pseudamphimeryx Temporal range: Middle Eocene to Late Eocene 43.5–37 Ma

Extinct genus of endemic Palaeogene European artiodactyls

Pseudamphimeryx is an extinct genus of Palaeogene artiodactyls belonging to the Amphimerycidae that was endemic to the central region of western Europe and lived from the Middle to Late Eocene. It was first erected in 1910 by the Swiss palaeontologist Hans Georg Stehlin, who assigned to it multiple species and noted specific differences from another amphimerycid, Amphimeryx. As of present, it is known by six species, although the validity of P. valdensis has been questioned while the earliest-appearing species P. schosseri has been suggested to not be an amphimerycid.

Pseudamphimeryx is very similar to Amphimeryx with its selenodont (crescent-like ridges) dentition and its fused "cubonavicular bone" (cuboid bone and navicular bone) of its hind legs, both of which are recorded in ruminants in an instance of parallel evolution. Both amphimerycid genera had large orbits and long snouts. Pseudamphimeryx has very specific differences with Amphimeryx such as the occipital crest forms. Its selenodont dentition suggests that it had a preference for leaf-eating diets. Pseudamphimeryx was a tiny-sized artiodactyl that likely weighed less than 1 kg (2.2 lb).

It inhabited western Europe back when it was an archipelago that was isolated from the rest of Eurasia, meaning that it lived in a tropical-subtropical environment with various other faunas that also evolved with strong levels of endemism. This meant that it coexisted with a wide variety of other artiodactyls and perissodactyls. Although it survived a major faunal turnover by the Middle Eocene, it was eventually replaced by Amphimeryx in the Late Eocene.

== Taxonomy ==
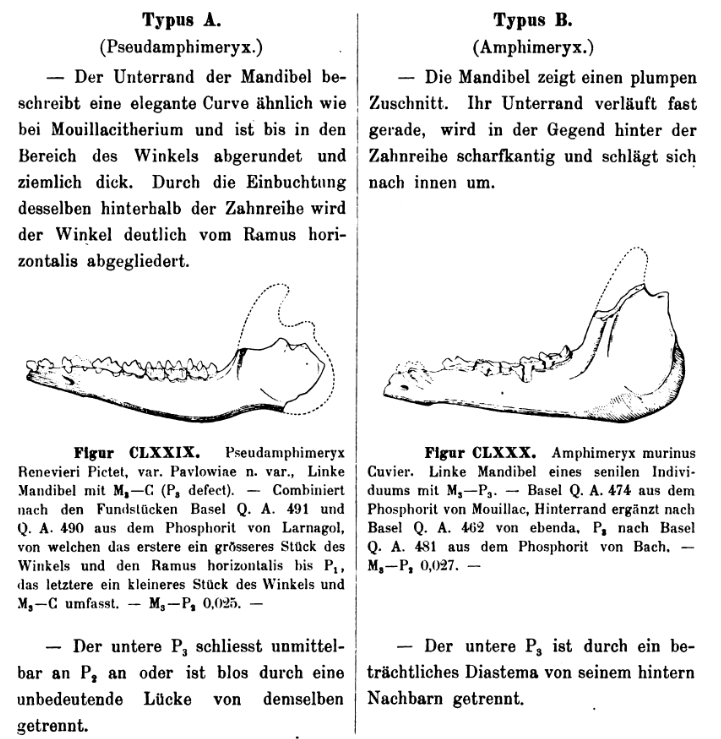
Mandibles of Pseudamphimeryx renevieri (left) and Amphimeryx murinus (right), 1910

In 1910, the Swiss palaeontologist Hans Georg Stehlin erected the genus Pseudamphimeryx, introducing it as an artiodactyl that differed from Amphimeryx by specific cranial and dental traits. He first recognized the species Pseudamphimeryx Renevieri, which was previously classified as Cainotherium then Xiphodontherium (the latter genus of which he synonymized with Amphimeryx); "C." renevieri was previously named by the naturalists François Jules Pictet de la Rive and Aloïs Humbert in 1869. The second species that he classified to Pseudamphimeryx was P. Schlosseri, first named as a species of Xiphodontherium by Ludwig Ruetimeyer in 1891. Stehlin then named the species P. valdensis based on lower fossil molars from the Swiss locality of Mormont, stating that it was smaller than P. renevieri in size. He also recognized two additional taxa from the Phosphorites du Quercy site: P. Renevieri var. Pavlowiae and P. decedens. (Note: Due to archaic species naming conventions, authors of the 19th and 20th centuries tended to capitalize species names based on individuals or places. "Var." as used in taxonomy stands for "variety" and is most typically used in botany.)

In 1928, English palaeontologist Clive Forster-Cooper erected P. hantonensis based on two upper molars from Hordle in England. In 1978, French palaeontologist Jean Sudre recognized P. pavloviae as a distinct species whose name he emended from P. pavlowiae and erected another species named P. salesmei based on a mandible from the French locality of Salesmes.

In 1974, the French palaeontologist Colette Dechaseaux noted that P. decedens had notably large orbits along with preorbital fossae in front of them like in deer. She cast doubt that the species actually belonged to Pseudamphimeryx because of the molar forms. Similarly in 1978, Sudre expressed that P. decedens actually belonged to Pseudamphimeryx, stating that the short premolars, large orbits, and preorbital fossae are not present in any other skull of other amphimerycids. In 1984, Sudre tentatively reassigned P. decedens to the tragulid genus Cryptomeryx as C? decedens, building on to Dechaseaux's study by confirming that the by then lost skull would have belonged to a small ruminant. In 1986, however, Geneviève Bouvrain, Denis Geraads and Sudre revised Cryptomeryx as a synonym of Lophiomeryx, but it was alternatively considered a synonym of Iberomeryx by Bastien Mennecart et al. in 2010. C? decedens had tentatively been placed in Iberomeryx in a 2012 PhD thesis by Mennecart. (Note: The species "L." gaudryi, formerly the type species of the now-invalid Cryptomeryx, is pending reassessment to another genus.)

In 2000, the palaeontologists Jerry J. Hooker and Marc Weidmann suggested that P. pavloviae be emended back to P. pavlowiae based on Stehlin's original spelling and argued that P. valdensis was either a nomen dubium or a junior synonym of P. renevieri. In 2007, palaeontologists Jörg Erfurt and Grégoire Métais listed P. valdensis as a valid species without referencing Hooker and Weidmann's invalidation of the species.

=== Classification ===
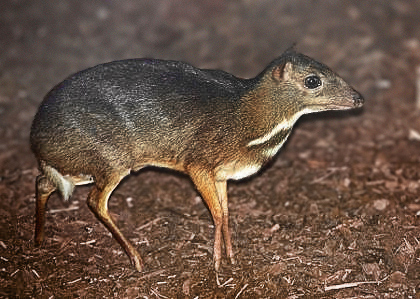
Because of some similar anatomical traits of the amphimerycids to those of ruminants (like the Java mouse-deer (Tragulus javanicus), pictured), they were previously considered ruminants by biologists. Today, their evolutionary relationship to ruminants and other artiodactyls proves unclear.

Pseudamphimeryx belongs to the Amphimerycidae, a Palaeogene artiodactyl family endemic to western Europe that lived from the middle to the earliest Oligocene (~44 to 33 Ma). Like the other contemporary endemic artiodactyl families of western Europe, the evolutionary origins of the Amphimerycidae are poorly known. The family is generally thought to have made its first appearance by the unit MP14 of the Mammal Palaeogene zones, making them the first artiodactyls with selenodont (crescent-shaped ridge form) dentition to have appeared in the landmass along with the Xiphodontidae. The first representative of the Amphimerycidae to have appeared was Pseudamphimeryx, lasting from MP14 to MP17. Amphimeryx made its first appearance in MP18 as the only other known amphimerycid genus and lasted up to MP21, after the Grande Coupure faunal turnover event.

Because of its similar anatomical traits with ruminants, some palaeontologists had originally included the Amphimerycidae within the suborder Ruminantia while some others rejected the placement. Today, its similarities with ruminants is thought to have been an instance of parallel evolution, in which amphimerycids and ruminants independently gained similar traits. While amphimerycids have typically been excluded from the Ruminantia due to dental characteristics, it does not eliminate the possibility of them being sister taxa to ruminants by the latter independently gaining longer legs and more selenodont (crescent-shaped) dentition. The affinities of the Amphimerycidae, along with those of other endemic European artiodactyls, are unclear; the Amphimerycidae, Anoplotheriidae, Xiphodontidae, Mixtotheriidae, and Cainotheriidae have been determined to be closer to either tylopods (i.e. camelids and merycoidodonts) or ruminants. Different phylogenetic analyses have produced different results for the "derived" (or evolutionarily recent) selenodont Eocene European artiodactyl families, making it uncertain whether they were closer to the Tylopoda or Ruminantia.

In an article published in 2019, Romain Weppe et al. conducted a phylogenetic analysis on the Cainotherioidea within the Artiodactyla based on mandibular and dental characteristics, specifically in terms of relationships with artiodactyls of the Palaeogene. The results found that the superfamily was closely related to the Mixtotheriidae and Anoplotheriidae. They determined that the Cainotheriidae, Robiacinidae, Anoplotheriidae, and Mixtotheriidae formed a clade that was the sister group to the Ruminantia while Tylopoda, along with the Amphimerycidae and Xiphodontidae split earlier in the tree. The phylogenetic tree used for the journal and another published work about the cainotherioids is outlined below:

- - Eurodexis russelli
  - Dichobune leporina
  - - - Amphimeryx murinus
      - - Xiphodon castrense
        - Tylopoda
          - Paratoceras coatesi
          - Eotylopus reedi
    - - Ruminantia
        - Parvitragulus priscus
        - - Lophiomeryx chalaniati
          - Archaeomeryx optatus
      - - Mixtotheriidae
          Mixtotherium cuspidatum
        - Anoplotheriidae
          - Anoplotherium latipes
          - Dacrytherium ovinum
        - Cainotherioidea
          - Robiacinidae
            - Robiacina lavergnesis
            - - Robiacina minuta
              - Robiacina quercyi
          - Cainotheriidae
            - Palembertina deplasi
            - - Oxacroninae
                - Paroxacron bergeri
                - - Paroxacron valdense
                  - Oxacron courtoisii
              - Cainotheriinae
                - Cainotherium laticurvatum
                - - Caenomeryx
                    - Caenomeryx filholi
                    - Caenomeryx procommunis
                  - Plesiomeryx
                    - Plesiomeryx cadurcensis
                    - Plesiomeryx huerzeleri

In 2020, Vincent Luccisano et al. created a phylogenetic tree of the basal (or evolutionarily early) artiodactyls, including a majority endemic to western Europe, from the Palaeogene. In one clade, the "bunoselenodont endemic European" Mixtotheriidae, Anoplotheriidae, Xiphodontidae, Amphimerycidae, Cainotheriidae, and Robiacinidae are grouped together with the Ruminantia. The phylogenetic tree as produced by the authors, including Pseudamphimeryx, is shown below:

- Artiodactyla
  - Bunophorus
  - - Gunophorus
    - Diacodexis
  - - - Protodichobune
      - Eurodexis
    - - - Buxobune
        - - Mouillacitherium
          - Meniscodon
        - - - Hyperdichobune
            - - Dichobune robertiana
              - - Dichobune leporina
                - - Homacodon
                  - - Gobiohyus
                    - Suina
                      - - Khirtharia
                        - Entelodon
                      - - Palaeocheorus
                        - Perchoerus
          - - Haplobunodontidae
              - Haplobunodon
              - - Cuisitherium
                - Lophiobunodon
            - - Mixtotherium
              - - Robiacina
                - - - - Dacrytherium
                      - Diplobune
                    - - Xiphodon
                      - Paraxiphodon
                  - - - Cainotherium
                      - Paroxacron
                    - - Archaeomeryx
                      - - Amphimeryx
                        - Pseudamphimeryx
      - - Aumelasia
        - - - Hallebune
            - Amphirhagatherium
          - - Cebochoeridae
              - Cebochoerus
              - Gervachoerus
            - - Choeropotamus
              - Siamotherium

In 2022, Weppe conducted a phylogenetic analysis in his academic thesis regarding Palaeogene artiodactyl lineages, focusing most specifically on the endemic European families. One large monophyletic (group with no evolutionarily descendants) set consisted of the Hyperdichobuninae, Amphimerycidae, Xiphodontidae, and Cainotherioidea based on dental synapomorphies (exclusive anatomical traits shared from an ancestral group), of which the hyperdichobunines are paraphyletic in relation to the other clades. In terms of the amphimerycids, while the clade consisting of P. renevieri and A. murinus was recovered as a sister group to the other endemic artiodactyl clades, the placement of P. schlosseri has rendered the Amphimerycidae paraphyletic (group with descendants) in relation to the derived amphimerycid species and other families. He argued that the Amphimerycidae thus needs a systemic revision for which P. schlosseri would be assigned to a new genus and removed from the Amphimerycidae.

== Description ==
=== Skull ===
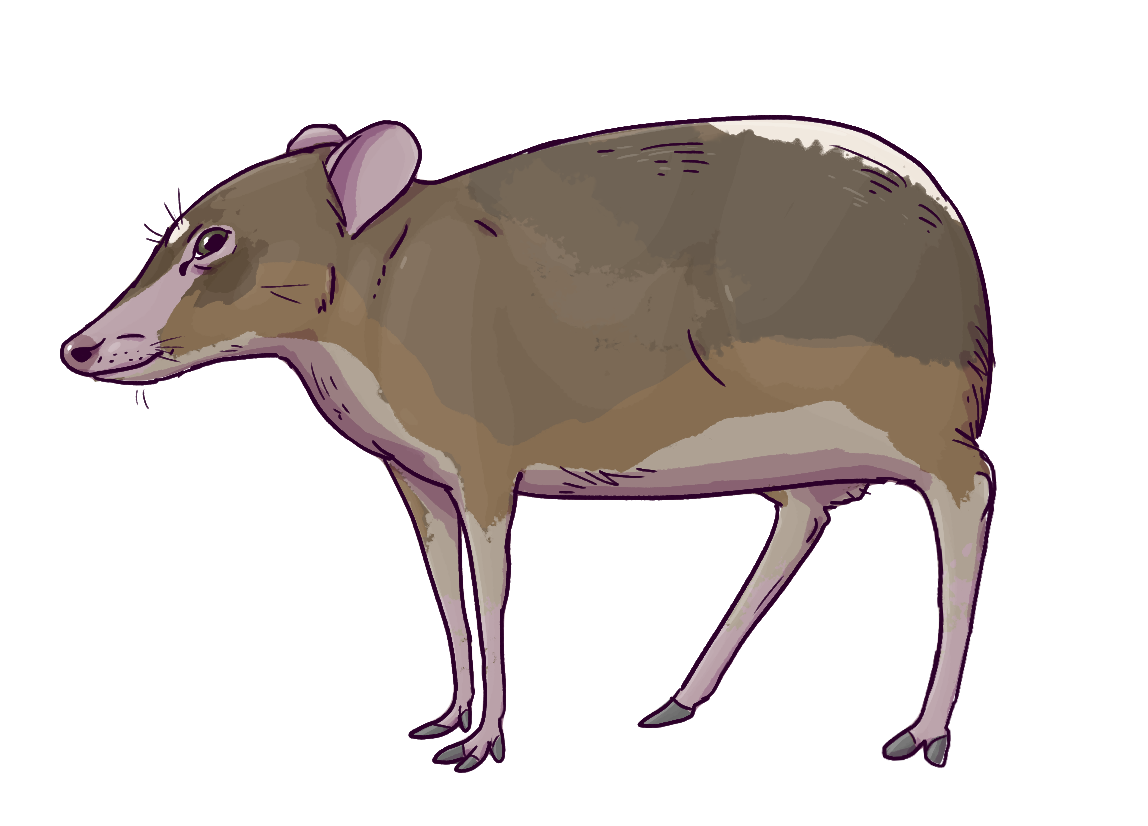
Restoration of P. renevieri based on known fossil material

The Amphimerycidae is defined in part as having an elongated snout and large orbits that are widened in their backs. Pseudmphimeryx specifically is described as having a skull whose peak appears initially concave at the occipital crest's front, ascends slightly, and then finally slopes down. The skull is also diagnosed as having strong body orifices in its basicranium and projecting occipital crests. Pseudamphimeryx and Amphimeryx, both known by multiple skull specimens, have very similar forms but differ based on a few characteristics. Amphimeryx is also distinguished from Pseudamphimeryx by the more well-developed occipital crest. Its skull additionally resembles those of both Dacrytherium and Tapirulus.

The overall skull of Pseudamphimeryx is very elongated especially in comparison to Mouillacitherium but falls short of that of Amphimeryx. The parietal bone and squamosal bone both make up a prominent portion of the cranial cavity's wall. Both amphimerycid genera have especially prominent occipital and sagittal crests, the latter of which each divide into two less prominent branches behind the fronto-parietal suture that extend up to the supraorbital foramen. This is unlike Mouillacitherium where the crest's extension only goes up to the foramen's back. The glenoid surface of Pseudamphimeryx is positioned slightly above the overall base of the skull and has a slightly convex form as opposed to a flat one like in primitive ruminants. The glenoid region of the skull also has a deep concavity above it like in ruminants but unlike in anoplotheriids. The zygomatic arch, or cheek bone, is thin. The orientation of the occipital crest differs by amphimerycid genus, with that of Pseudamphimeryx being straight and vertical. Amphimerycids have primitive "mastoid" forms (in which the periotic bone of the ear is exposed to the skull's surface) akin to those of the dichobunids Dichobune and Mouillacitherium.

The frontal bones of both amphimerycid genera are large and flat, being particularly sizeable in their supraorbital portions; this trait is more pronounced in Amphimeryx. The frontal bones of Amphimeryx is close to the orbits' upper edges and is more prominent in position between the two orbits than that of Pseudamphimeryx. The supraorbital foramen of Amphimeryx is wider than it is long and is proportionally larger than that of Pseudamphimeryx. It is also more perpendicular to the sagittal plane in its back edge, which is not oriented backwards like in Pseudamphimeryx. The lacrimal bone of both amphimerycids, but especially in Amphimeryx, has an extensive pars facialis (underside of the orbit) and is quadrangular in shape, narrowing at its front. The orbit is large, is positioned back in relation to the overall skull, is wide at its back area, and is more curved at its upper compared to lower edge. There is no difference between both amphimerycids in terms of the orbits. The optic foramen, located in the sphenoid bone, extends more forward in Amphimeryx than in Pseudamphimeryx. While the nasal bone is not as well-preserved in Amphimeryx fossils, the frontonasal suture is implied by research to have formed a W shape on the skull's upper surface like that of Pseudamphimeryx. Both amphimerycid genera also have similar, although not identical, medial positions of the infraorbital foramen in the maxilla. The palatine bones of Amphimeryx and Pseudamphimeryx are narrower at their front than back ends.

The mandible of Pseudamphimeryx is undulated at the lower edge of its horizontal branch, or the mandibular corpus, and, like in Amphimeryx, has a large and slightly rounded angular border. The coronoid process of the mandible is positioned lower in relation to the overall skull unlike in ruminants, and the temporomandibular joint is also lower than in Amphimeryx.

Pseudamphimeryx is also known from a brain endocast, although the endocasts of it and Amphimeryx were not well-studied. Its neocortex was described by Dechaseaux as being of a primitive and simple type in the larger evolutionary scale of artiodactyls.

=== Dentition ===
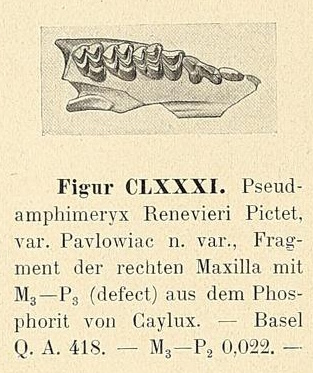
P. renevieri lower dentition, 1910

The dental formula of the Amphimerycidae is 3.1.4.33.1.4.3 for a total of 44 teeth, consistent with the primitive dental formula for early-middle Palaeogene placental mammals. The canines (C/c) are incisiform (incisor (I/i) form) and therefore differ little from the incisors themselves. The premolars (P/p) are elongated and may generally be separated by diastemata (gaps between teeth). The lower premolars have three lobes, or developed areas on their crowns. The upper molars (M/m) are more developed in form and are generally subtriangular in shape, although some may be more rectangular. They have five crescent-shaped (selenodont) tubercles and sometimes a partial hypocone cusp that may be present in all species. Amphimerycids differ from ruminants, particularly the basal clade Tragulina, in the retentions of their first premolars and their high levels of specialization in their selenodonty and number of cusps in their molars. Their dentitions more closely resemble those of xiphodonts or dacrytheriines than of ruminants.

Pseudamphimeryx specifically is diagnosed in part as having moderate diastemata between P^{1} and P^{2}. P_{1} is similarly separated from P_{2} by a diastema but is closer to the lower canine. Its upper molars have five tubercles along with a single front cingulum each. In the lower molars, the labial cuspids are crescent-shaped whereas the lingual cuspids are subconical. The peak of the crescent formed by the metaconid and entoconid cusps is rounder in the molars of Pseudamphimeryx than in those of Amphimeryx, a diagnostic trait separating the two genera.

In terms of non-diagnostic features of the amphimerycids, both genera have somewhat asymmetrical incisors that are shovel-shaped and have sharp edges on their crowns. The canines are similar to incisors but differ by their slightly more asymmetrical shapes. P^{1} and P^{2} have both been described as narrow and elongated, but the former tooth is larger than the latter. The overall selenodonty and brachyodonty (low-crowned teeth) of amphimerycids suggest that they were adapted towards folivorous (leaf-eating) dietary habits.

=== Postcranial skeleton ===
According to Sudre and Cécile Blondel in 1995 and Erfurt and Métais in 2007, there are three reports of postcranial fossils assigned to Pseudamphimeryx: a "cubonavicular" bone (fused cuboid bone and navicular bone of the hind legs) of P. pavloviae from La Bouffie plus P. salesmei from Salesmes and an astragalus of P. renevieri from the French commune of Euzet. The latter fossil is suggested to prove the presence of a fused cubonavicular bone in P. renevieri. The fused cubonavicular bone trait has also been reported in Amphimeryx, which appeared after Pseudamphimeryx and is also generally a defining trait of ruminants in an instance of parallel evolution.

The later relative Amphimeryx, unlike Pseudamphimeryx, is known by complete hind leg evidence including the cubonavicular bone. The overall morphology of the hind leg's bones are reminiscent of those of derived (including extant) ruminants such as in tragulids. More specifically, Amphimeryx was functionally didactyl (two-toed) because, as in derived ruminants, its two middle toes, making up a single cannon bone, are elongated while its two side digits are greatly reduced. On the other hand, Amphimeryx differs from ruminants by the primitive morphology of the astragalus.

=== Size ===
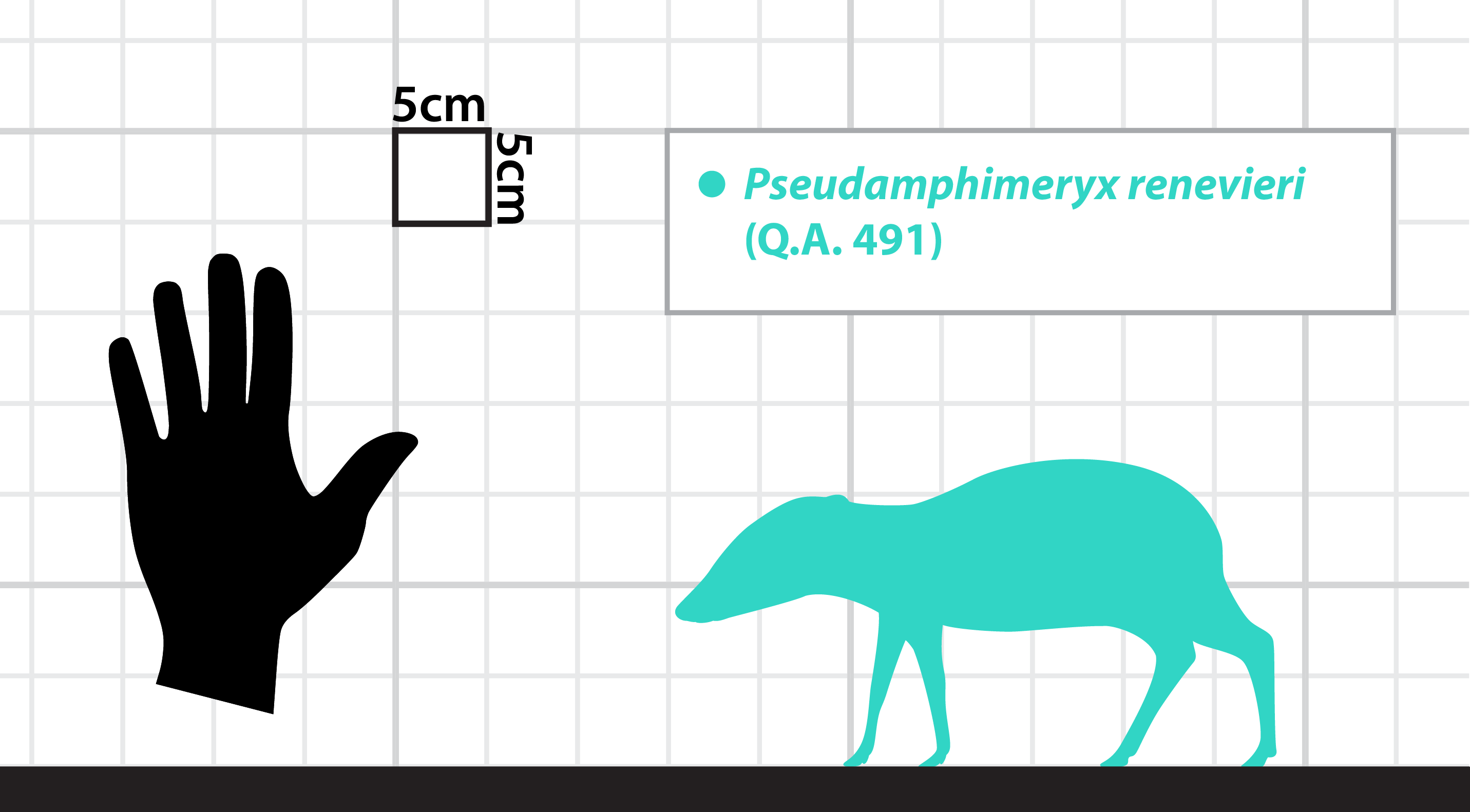
Estimated size comparison of P. renevieri based on known fossil remains

The Amphimerycidae consists only of small-sized species within Amphimeryx and Pseudamphimeryx. According to Blondel, amphimerycid species would have ranged from 0.4 kg (0.88 lb) to 1.5 kg (3.3 lb) total. Similarly, Hooker et al. stated that Pseudamphimeryx was a tiny artiodactyl genus that weighed less than 1 kg (2.2 lb) total. In comparison, Amphimeryx, while still small-sized compared to most other Palaeogene artiodactyls, was larger with estimated weights of 1.846 kg (4.07 lb) based on its M_{1} and 1.511 kg (3.33 lb) based on the astragalus.

Some species of Pseudamphimeryx had been differentiated based on size in addition to morphology, with Sudre differentiating P. pavloviae from P. renevieri (which coexisted) by the former being larger in size and having more elongated premolars. Hooker and Weidmann suggested that Sudre's measures for proportional sizes between the two species could be potentially challenged by the variations in dental morphology and gaps in quantitative analyses. Therefore, they argued that additional statistical analyses need to be conducted that identify and separate different molar types (first to third molars) to better represent species size differences.

== Palaeoecology ==
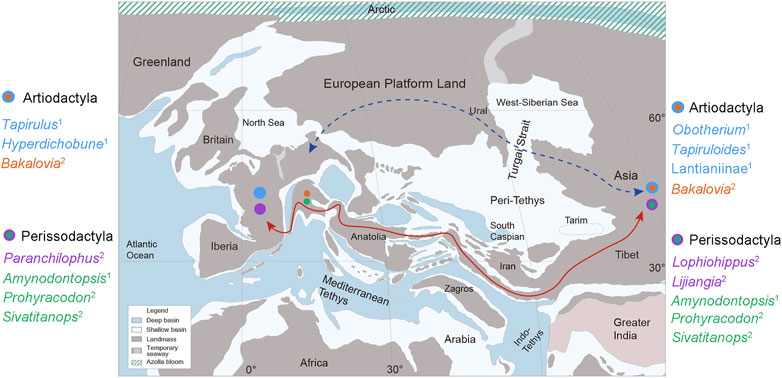
Palaeogeography of Europe and Asia during the Middle Eocene with possible artiodactyl and perissodactyl dispersal routes.

For much of the Eocene, a hothouse climate with humid, tropical environments with consistently high precipitations prevailed. Modern mammalian orders including the Perissodactyla, Artiodactyla, and Primates (or the suborder Euprimates) appeared already by the Early Eocene, diversifying rapidly and developing dentitions specialized for folivory. The omnivorous forms mostly either switched to folivorous diets or went extinct by the Middle Eocene (47–37 Ma) along with the archaic "condylarths". By the Late Eocene (approx. 37–33 mya), most of the ungulate form dentitions shifted from bunodont (or rounded) cusps to cutting ridges (i.e. lophs) for folivorous diets.

Land connections between western Europe and North America were interrupted around 53 Ma. From the Early Eocene up until the Grande Coupure extinction event (56–33.9 mya), western Eurasia was separated into three landmasses: western Europe (an archipelago), Balkanatolia (in-between the Paratethys Sea of the north and the Neotethys Ocean of the south), and eastern Eurasia. The Holarctic mammalian faunas of western Europe were therefore mostly isolated from other landmasses including Greenland, Africa, and eastern Eurasia, allowing for endemism to develop. Therefore, the European mammals of the Late Eocene (MP17–MP20 of the Mammal Palaeogene zones) were mostly descendants of endemic Middle Eocene groups.

The Amphimerycidae, and by extent the older genus Pseudamphimeryx, is first recorded by the appearance of P. schlosseri in the Swiss locality of Egerkingen α + β, dating back to MP14. Both families would have coexisted with perissodactyls (Palaeotheriidae, Lophiodontidae, and Hyrachyidae), non-endemic artiodactyls (Dichobunidae and Tapirulidae), endemic European artiodactyls (Choeropotamidae, Cebochoeridae, and Anoplotheriidae), and primates (Adapidae). The stratigraphic ranges of the early species of Amphimeryx also overlapped with metatherians (Herpetotheriidae), cimolestans (Pantolestidae, Paroxyclaenidae), rodents (Ischyromyidae, Theridomyoidea, Gliridae), eulipotyphlans, bats, apatotherians, carnivoraformes (Miacidae), and hyaenodonts (Hyainailourinae, Proviverrinae). Other MP13-MP14 sites have also yielded fossils of turtles and crocodylomorphs, and MP13 sites are stratigraphically the latest to have yielded remains of the bird clades Gastornithidae and Palaeognathae.

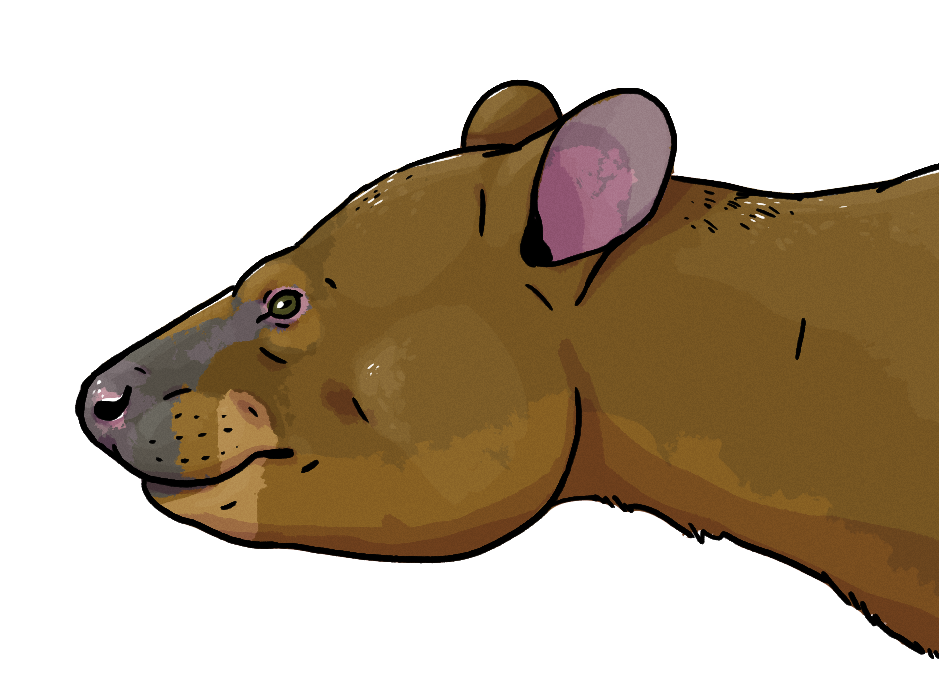
Restoration of Mixtotherium, which coexisted with Pseudamphimeryx for much of the Eocene

In addition to P. schlosseri, other mammals that appeared in Egerkingen α + β include the herpetotheriid Amphiperatherium, ischyromyids Ailuravus and Plesiarctomys, pseudosciurid Treposciurus, omomyid Necrolemur, adapid Leptadapis, proviverrine Proviverra, palaeotheres (Propalaeotherium, Anchilophus, Lophiotherium, Plagiolophus, Palaeotherium), hyrachyid Chasmotherium, lophiodont Lophiodon, dichobunids Hyperdichobune and Mouillacitherium, choeropotamid Rhagatherium, anoplotheriid Catodontherium, cebochoerid Cebochoerus, tapirulid Tapirulus, mixtotheriid Mixtotherium, and the xiphodonts Dichodon and Haplomeryx.

The unit MP16 records the appearances of P. renevieri and P. pavloviae, both of which are known from the MP16 French locality of Robiac. Other mammal genera that cooccur in the site include the herpetotheriids Amphiperatherium and Peratherium, apatemyid Heterohyus, nyctitheriid Saturninia, rodents (Glamys, Elfomys, Plesiarctomys, Ailuravus, Remys), omomyids Pseudoloris and Necrolemur, adapid Adapis, hyaenodonts Paroxyaena and Cynohyaenodon, carnivoraformes Paramiacis and Quercygale, palaeotheres (Propalaeotherium, Anchilophus, Plagiolophus, Pachynolophus, Palaeotherium), lophiodont Lophiodon, hyrachyid Chasmotherium, cebochoerids Acotherulum and Cebochoerus, choeropotamid Choeropotamus, tapirulid Tapirulus, anoplotheriids (Dacrytherium, Catodontherium, Robiatherium), robiacinid Robiacina, and xiphodonts (Xiphodon, Dichodon, Haplomeryx).

After MP16, a faunal turnover occurred, marking the disappearances of the lophiodonts and European hyrachyids as well as the extinctions of all European crocodylomorphs except for the alligatoroid Diplocynodon. The causes of the faunal turnover have been attributed to a shift from humid and highly tropical environments to drier and more temperate forests with open areas and more abrasive vegetation. The surviving herbivorous faunas shifted their dentitions and dietary strategies accordingly to adapt to abrasive and seasonal vegetation. However, the environments were still subhumid and covered by subtropical evergreen forests. The Palaeotheriidae was the sole remaining European perissodactyl group, and frugivorous-folivorous or purely folivorous artiodactyls became the dominant group in western Europe.

The Late Eocene unit MP17 records as many as four species of Pseudamphimeryx: P. renevieri, P. havloviae, P. salesmei, and P. hantonensis. MP17a confirms the continued occurrence of P. renevieri in the French locality of Fons 4; MP17b is the latest unit that Pseudamphimeryx occurs and records both P. renevieri and P. pavloviae from another French locality of Perrière. Starting at MP18, Amphimeryx makes its first appearance and therefore succeeds Pseudamphimeryx. In Perrière, Pseudamphimeryx fossils have been found along with those of the herpetotheriids Peratherium and Amphiperatherium, pseudorhyncocyonid Pseudorhyncocyon, apatemyid Heterohyus, nyctitheriid Saturninia, various rodents and bats, omomyids Pseudoloris and Microchoerus, adapid Leptadapis, hyaenodontid Hyenodon, miacid Quercygale, palaeotheres (Lophiotherium, Palaeotherium, and Plagiolophus), dichobunid Mouillacitherium, cebochoerid Acotherulum, mixtothere Mixtotherium, anoplotheriid Dacrytherium, tapirulid Tapirulus, and the xiphodonts Dichodon and Haplomeryx.
