= Pseudoloris =

Pseudoloris Temporal range: Ypresian–Rupelian

Scientific classification
- Kingdom: Animalia
- Phylum: Chordata
- Class: Mammalia
- Order: Primates
- Suborder: Haplorhini
- Family: †Omomyidae
- Genus: †Pseudoloris; Stehlin, 1916

Species
- Pseudoloris crusafonti Louis and Sudre, 1975 Pseudoloris cuestai Minwer-Barakat et al., 2012 Pseudoloris erenensis Wang, 2008 Pseudoloris godinoti Köhler and Moyá-Solá, 1999 Pseudoloris isabenae Crusafont Pairó, 1967 Pseudoloris parvulus Filhol, 1890 Pseudoloris pyrenaicus Minwer-Barakat et al., 2010 Pseudoloris reguanti Crusafont Pairó, 1967

Extinct genus of primate

Pseudoloris is an extinct genus of omomyid primate that lived in Eurasia during the Eocene and Oligocene epochs.

== Palaeobiology ==
=== Palaeoecology ===
Dental microwear evidences that Pseudoloris parvulus had a strictly insectivorous diet.
