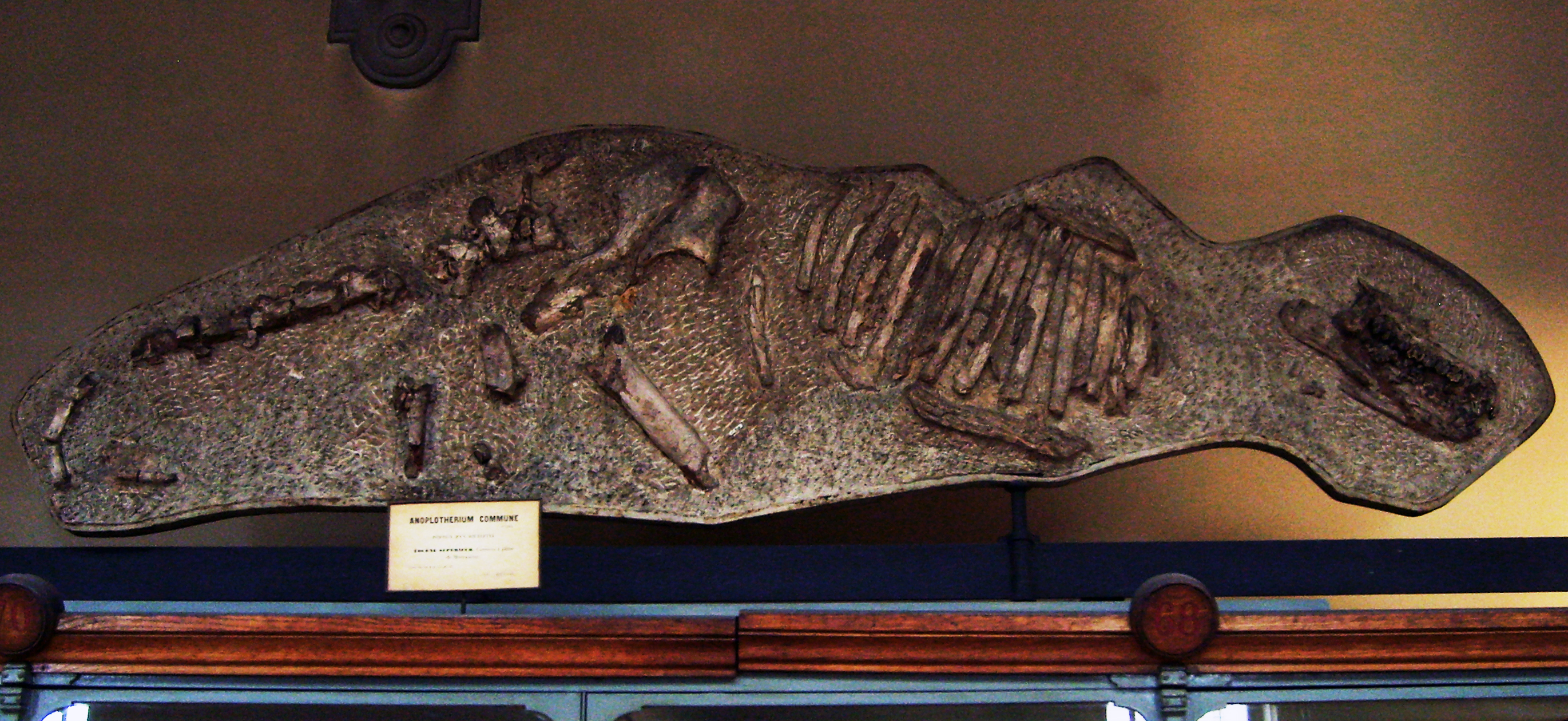
- Anoplotherium commune incomplete skeleton from the commune of Pantin, National Museum of Natural History, France
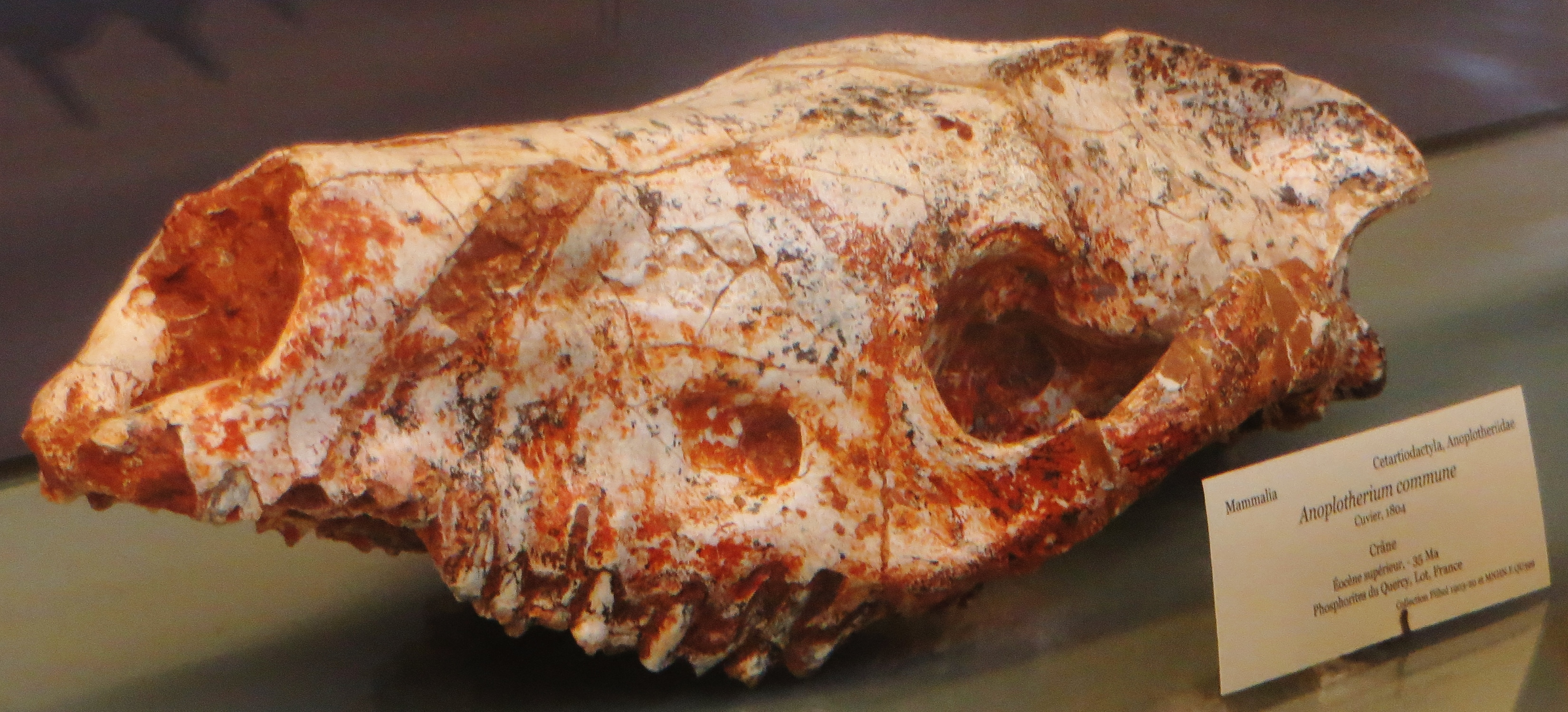
- Skull of Anoplotherium commune at the National Museum of Natural History, France

Scientific classification
- Kingdom: Animalia
- Phylum: Chordata
- Class: Mammalia
- Order: Artiodactyla
- Family: †Anoplotheriidae
- Subfamily: †Anoplotheriinae
- Genus: †Anoplotherium; Cuvier, 1804

Type species
- †Anoplotherium commune Cuvier, 1804

Other species
- †A. laurillardi Pomel, 1851; †A. latipes Gervais, 1852; †A. pompeckji Dietrich, 1922

Synonyms
- Genus synonymy: Eurytherium Gervais, 1852; Synonyms of A. commune: Anoplotherium duvmoyi Pomel, 1851; Synonyms of A. latipes: Anoplotherium platypus Pomel, 1851; Anoplotherium tridactylum Kovalevsky, 1873; Synonyms of A. laurillardi: Anoplotherium cuvieri Pomel, 1851

= Anoplotherium =

Anoplotherium Temporal range: Late Eocene – early Oligocene 37–33.4 Ma

Extinct genus of endemic Paleogene European artiodactyls

Anoplotherium is the type genus of the extinct Palaeogene artiodactyl family Anoplotheriidae, which was endemic to Western Europe. It lived from the Late Eocene to the earliest Oligocene. It was the fifth fossil mammal genus to be described with official taxonomic authority, with a history extending back to 1804 when its fossils from Montmartre in Paris, France were first described by the French naturalist Georges Cuvier. Discoveries of incomplete skeletons of A. commune in 1807 led Cuvier to thoroughly describe unusual features for which there are no modern analogues. His drawn skeletal and muscle reconstructions of A. commune in 1812 were amongst the first instances of anatomical reconstructions based on fossil evidence. Cuvier's contributions to palaeontology based on his works on the genus were revolutionary for the field, not only proving the developing ideas of extinction and ecological succession but also paving the way for subfields such as palaeoneurology. Today, there are four known species.

Anoplotherium was amongst the largest non-whippomorph artiodactyls of the Palaeogene period, weighing on average 115 kg (254 lb) to 271 kg (597 lb) and measuring at least 2.5 m (8 ft 2 in) in head and body length and 1.25 m (4 ft 1 in) in shoulder height. It was an evolutionarily advanced and unusual artiodactyl, sporting three-toed feet in certain species like A. latipes, a long and robust tail, and a highly-developed brain with strong support for both sense of smell and sensory perception. Its overall robust build and elongate tail has been suggested to have allowed it to stand bipedally like a gerenuk to browse on plants at greater heights, reaching approximately 3 m (9.8 ft) tall, effectively competing with the few other medium to large herbivores it lived with. The full extent of its bipedalism needs to be confirmed by more research, however. The larger, two-toed A. commune and slightly smaller, three-toed A. latipes may be sexual dimorphs in that the former is female and the latter male, but this idea remains speculative. Its closest relative was Diplobune, which similarly is hypothesized to have had specialized behaviours.

The artiodactyl lived in western Europe back when it was an archipelago that was isolated from the rest of Eurasia, meaning that it lived in an environment with various other faunas that also evolved with strong levels of endemism. Its exact origins are unknown, but it arose long after a shift towards drier but still subhumid conditions that led to abrasive plants and the extinctions of the large-sized Lophiodontidae, achieving gigantism and establishing itself as a dominant herbivore throughout the entirety of the western European region given its abundant fossil evidence.

Anoplotherium was recorded up to the earliest Oligocene, which largely coincided with shifts towards further glaciation and seasonality as part of the Grande Coupure extinction and faunal turnover event in the earliest Oligocene of western Europe. Tropical and subtropical forests were rapidly replaced by more temperate environments, and most ocean barriers previously separating western Europe from eastern Eurasia closed, allowing for large faunal dispersals from Asia. Although the specific causes are uncertain, Anoplotherium was likely unable to adapt to these major changes for long and succumbed to extinction.

== Taxonomy ==
=== Research history ===
==== Identifications ====
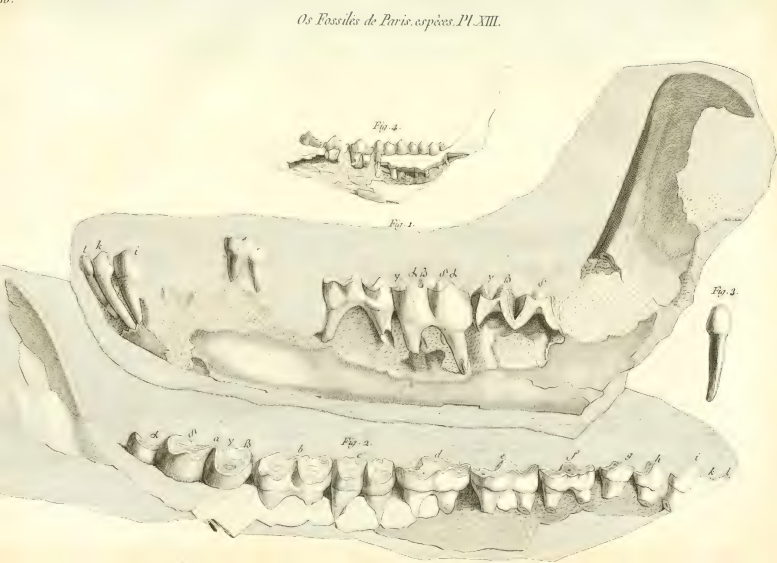
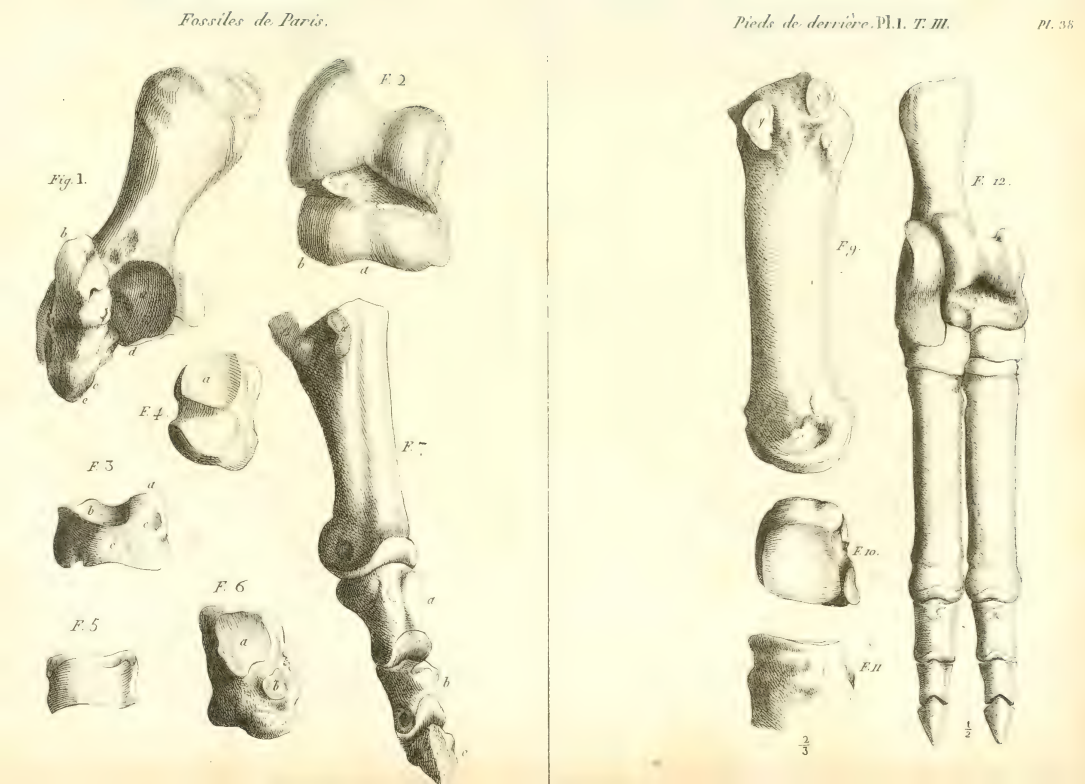
Sketches of dental, cranial, and limb remains of Anoplotherium commune by Georges Cuvier, 1804

While Georges Cuvier knew about fossil bones from the gypsum quarries of the outskirts of Paris (known as the Paris Basin) as early as at least 1800, it was not until 1804 that he would describe them. After describing Palaeotherium, he wrote about the next set of fossils that he was able to discern as being different from Palaeotherium based on dentition form, including the apparent lack of canines that left a large gap between the incisors and premolars. He observed that the hemimandible (half a mandible) had three lower incisors instead of four incisors or none which he said characterized other "pachyderms". Cuvier, basing the name on its apparent lack of suitable arms and canines for offensive attacks, erected the name Anoplotherium.

The genus name Anoplotherium means "unarmed beast" and is a compound of the Greek words αν- (an, 'not'), ὅπλον (hóplon, 'armor, large shield'), and θήρ (thēr, 'beast, wild animal').

Cuvier named three species of Anoplotherium in the same year, the first of which was the "sheep-sized" A. commune and the other three of which were "smaller species" that he named A. medium, A. minus, and A. minimum. The etymology of the species name A. commune refers to how "common" fossils of the species were while the etymologies of the other two species were based on sizes compared to A. commune. (Note: Latin commune is the neuter form of communis, which translates in English to 'common'.) He also attributed a cloven hoof (or didactyl hoof) to A. commune since the specimen appeared to be large-sized. He thought that Anoplotherium had didactyl hooves instead of tridactyl hooves, which would have separated it from Palaeotherium. Based on the hooves and dentition, he concluded that Anoplotherium was similar to ruminants or camelids. However, in 1807, Cuvier found out that Anoplotherium commune had three toes on its hind limbs, although the third index toes were of smaller sizes compared to the other two.

==== Skeletons ====
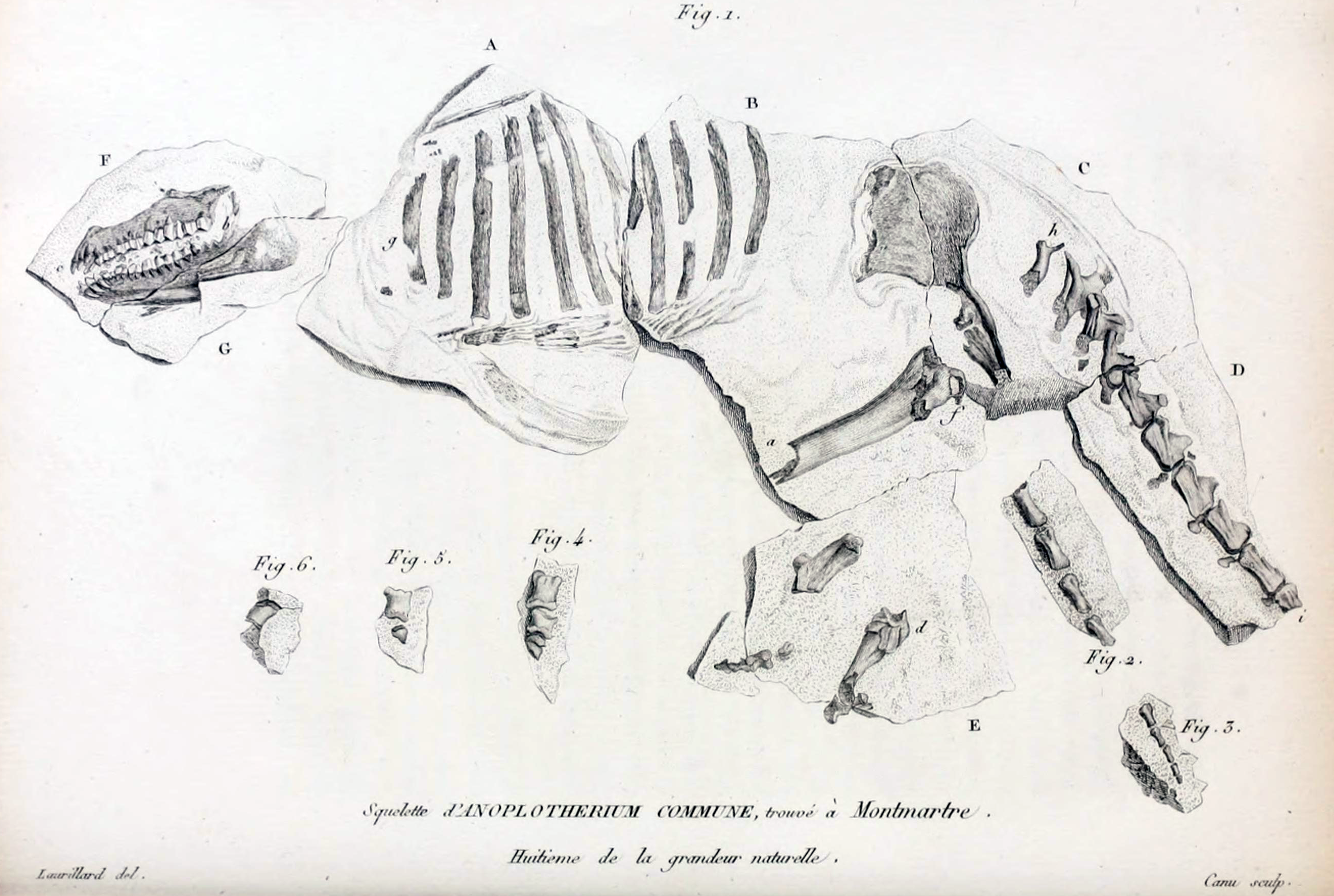
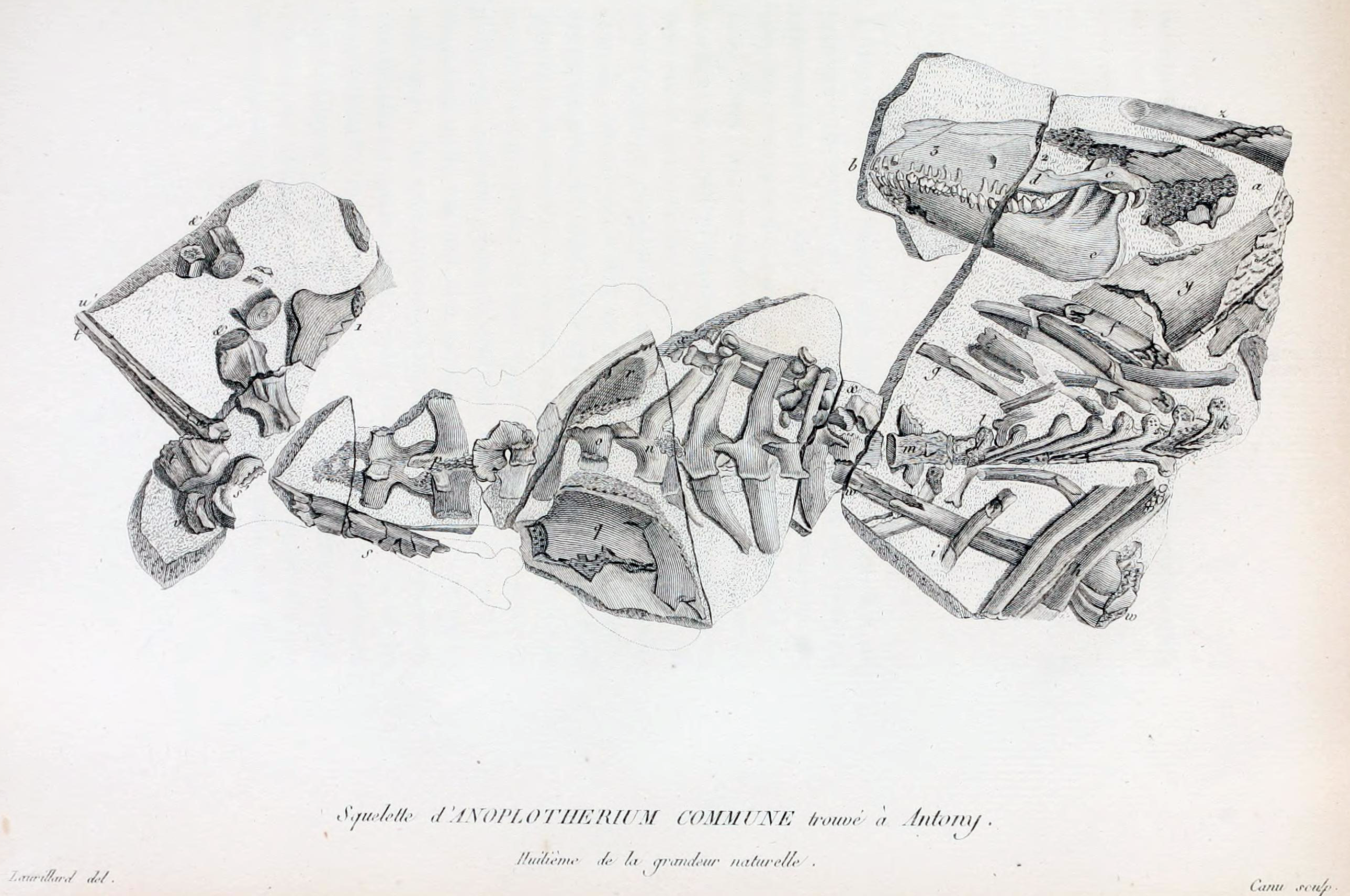
Sketches of two incomplete, embedded skeletons of Anoplotherium commune, found in the communes of Pantin (left skeleton) and Antony (right skeleton)

In 1807, Cuvier wrote about two incomplete skeletons that were recently uncovered, although the first was partially damaged because it was not collected carefully (which he expressed as having frustrated his understanding of the skeletal anatomy of Anoplotherium initially). The first skeleton, found in the quarries of Montmartre in the commune of Pantin, helped to confirm Cuvier's earlier diagnoses of Anoplotherium as correct. The embedded skeleton was the size of a small horse and helped to confirm the large didactyl feet and the 44 total teeth that it had (11 in each side of its jaw). It also had 11 complete ribs and a fragment of a 12th, matching with the number of ribs of camelids. The most surprising element to Cuvier, however, was the enormous tail with 22 vertebrae in the skeleton, a feature that he said he would not have known about previously, as there are no modern analogues of the elongated and thick tail in any large quadrupedal mammal.

The second incomplete skeleton came from Antony, this time more carefully removed with supervision from experts than the first skeleton. In it, he was able to confirm six lumbar vertebrae and three sacral vertebrae, all of which were extremely strong and probably supported the long tail. Most notable to Cuvier was the confirmation that Anoplotherium had two large fingers and one small finger on its front legs, which was unusual for mammals related to it.

==== Significance in palaeontological history ====
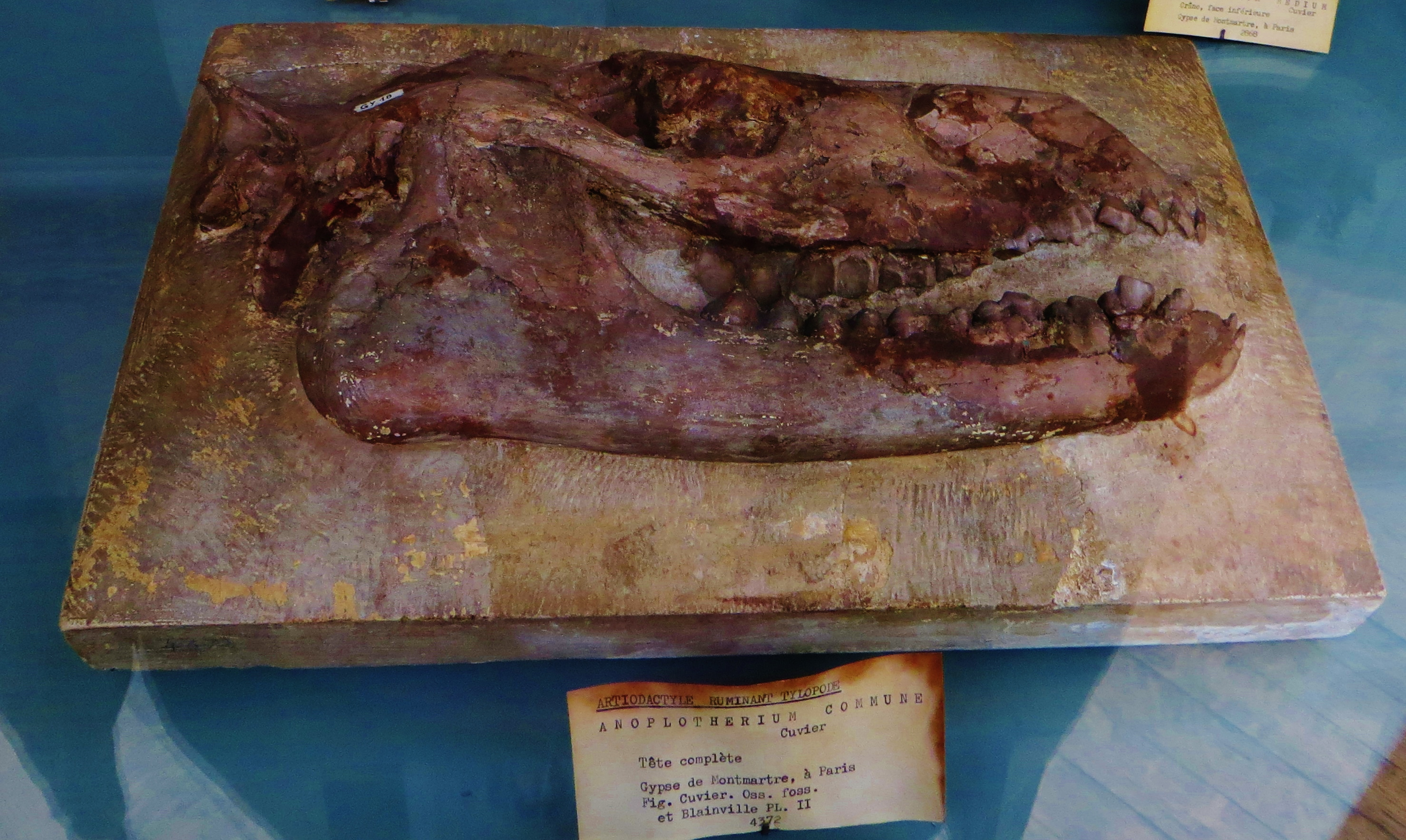
Anoplotherium commune skull, National Museum of Natural History, France

Although Palaeotherium and Anoplotherium are not well-recognized compared to fossil animals of other periods (i.e. Mesozoic dinosaurs and Neogene-Quaternary mammals), their fossil discoveries in Montmartre and formal descriptions by Cuvier are recognized as critical moments that pioneered palaeontology to the modern era. Unlike Pleistocene fossil genera in the Americas in early palaeontological history such as Megatherium and Mammut, Palaeotherium and Anoplotherium were not found in surface-level deposits but embedded in deeper, harder rock deposits dating to the Eocene. People in Paris had been previously familiar with animal skeletons being in their area for centuries, some of which were later kept and formally described. However, it was Cuvier who formally erected two fossil genera that came from older deposits, and from his homeland in the continent of Europe instead of the Americas where Megatherium and Mammut were found. The Palaeogene-aged fossils left no evidence of any later descendants, extinct or extant, although the similarities of Palaeotherium to tapirs made proving the theory more difficult. He noticed that below the gypsum was older sediments of seashells and reptiles like what Cuvier described as a giant "crocodile", which would later be known as Mosasaurus. Cuvier knew then that the world that Anoplotherium and Palaeotherium came from was a different span of time before that of the preceding time of sea reptiles and the proceeding times of Megatherium and Mammut, thereby proving the concept of natural extinction.

Cuvier's descriptions of an endocast (fossilized brain case) of a cerebral hemisphere belonging to a broken skull of A. commune from Montmartre, starting from 1804 up to 1822, are recognized as the first true instance of palaeoneurology, the study of brain evolution. The very first definition of an "endocast" dates back to 1822 when Cuvier described a mould of the brain of A. commune, noticing that it offered hints to the true shape of the brain of the now-extinct mammal (although it was later found to be a portion of the brain rather than the entirety of it). Since the first endocast study, many other brain studies were conducted for other fossil mammals throughout the second half of the 19th century onward. An 1822 description by Cuvier of a healed fractured femur of A. commune is cited as an early instance of palaeopathology, the study of ancient diseases and injuries on prehistoric organisms.

==== Early depictions ====
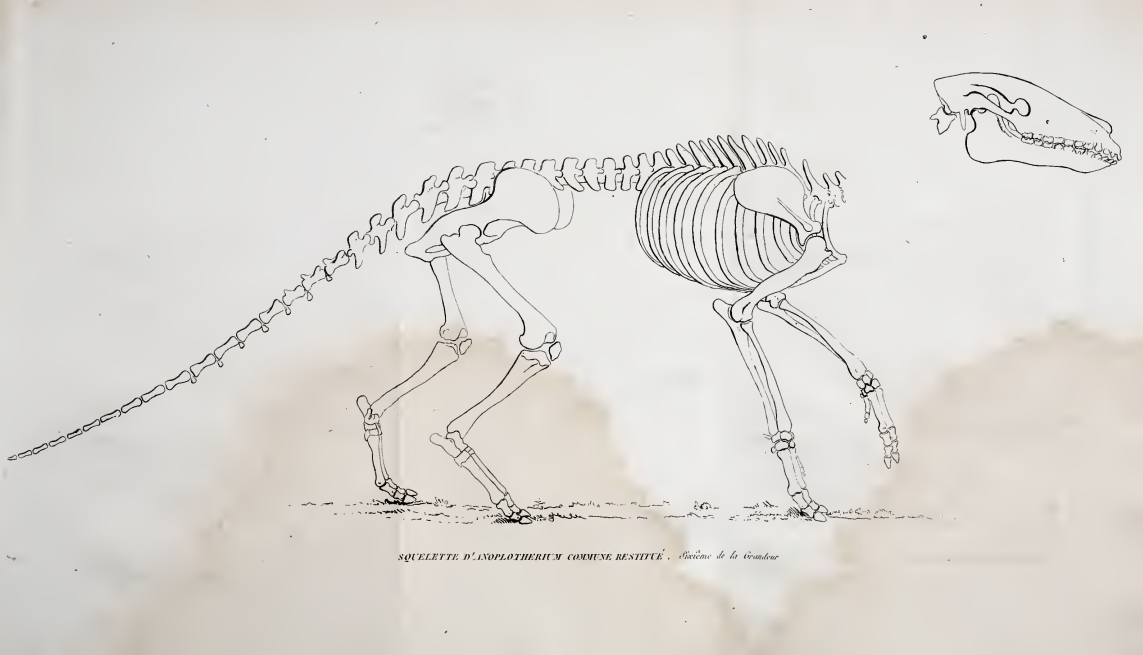
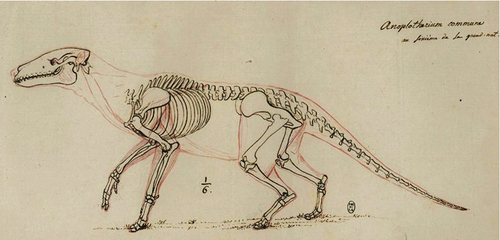
Georges Cuvier's published sketch (left) and unpublished sketch with outline (right) of an incomplete skeletal reconstruction of Anoplotherium commune, ~1812.

In 1812, Cuvier published his drawing of a skeletal reconstruction of A. commune based on known fossil remains of the species including the aforementioned incomplete skeletons. Based on the robust build of the mammal species, he hypothesized that its body structure was similar to otters except for its legs, that it was adapted for semi-aquatic life by swimming for consumption of aquatic plants, lacking long ears similar to semi-aquatic mammals, and living in marshy environments. Cuvier suggested that its lifestyle was therefore similar to semi-aquatic quadrupedal mammals like hippopotamuses and muroid rodents. He thought that in comparison, other species of Anoplotherium such as A. medium and A. minus were adapted for terrestrial behaviours and mixed feeding (browsing and grazing). Today, the reconstruction for the skeletal anatomy has aged well, mostly standing the test of time since 1812. Anoplotherium and Palaeotherium were also depicted in 1822 drawings by the French palaeontologist Charles Léopold Laurillard under the direction of Cuvier, although the restorations were not as detailed as Cuvier's.

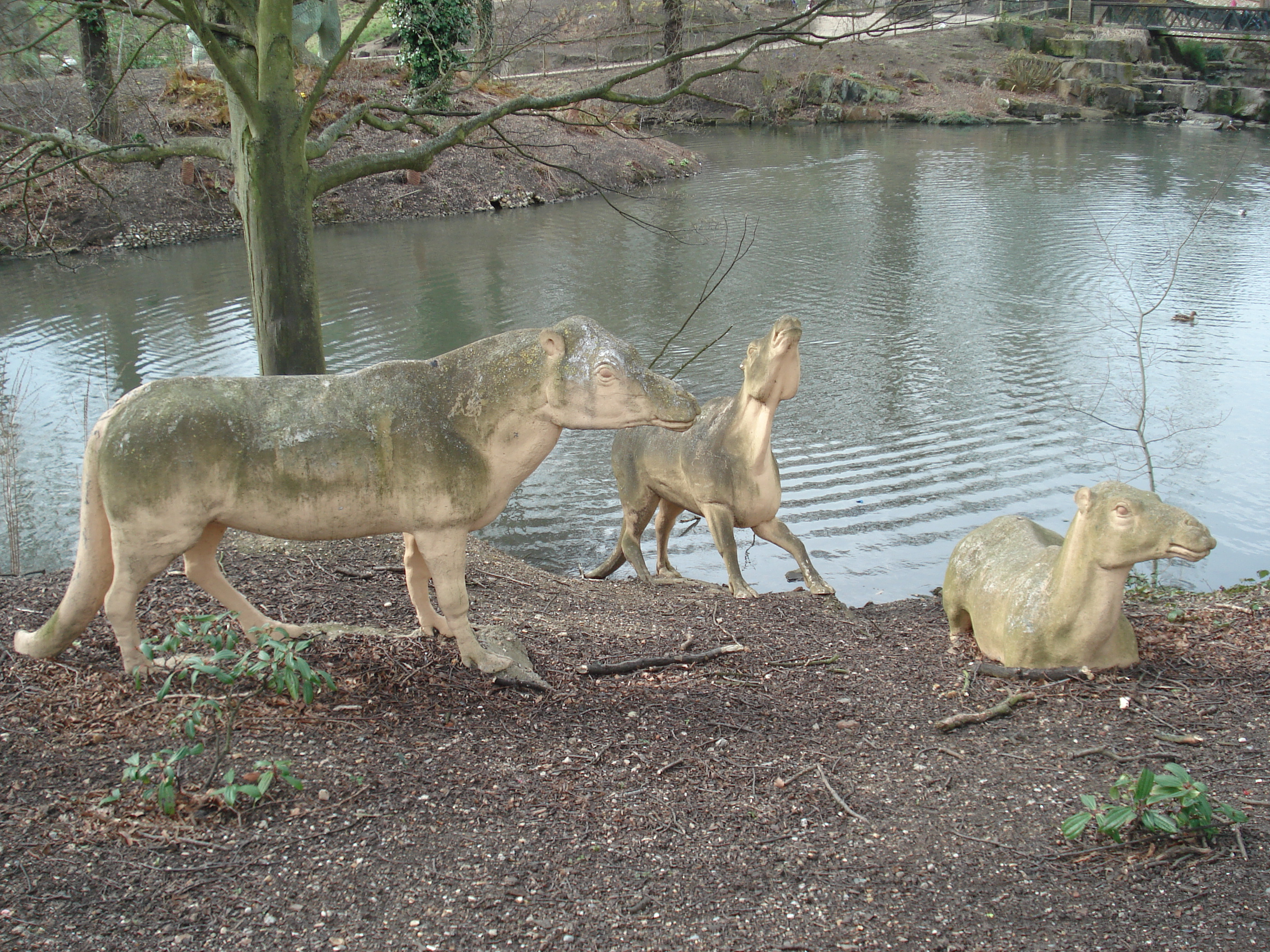
Sculptures of an Anoplotherium commune herd as part of the Crystal Palace Dinosaurs sculptures on the Tertiary Island of the Crystal Palace Park, United Kingdom

The reconstruction of Anoplotherium as an aquatic swimmer was supported by multiple 19th century European palaeontologists and persisted for over a century until 1938 when M. Dor rejected the theory of the genus as being aquatic-adapted based on anatomical differences from otters and hippopotamuses that contradict semi-aquatic behaviours and are more consistent with terrestrial life. This rejection was supported by Jerry J. Hooker in 2007 and Svitozar Davydenko et al. in 2023 based on anatomical traits, although the former disagreed with Dor's observations on the tail. Hooker argued that although the distal caudal vertebrae of the anoplothere are less prominent than those of kangaroos (Macropus), the vertebrae patterns of Anoplotherium are more similar to Macropus than ungulates like Bos or Equus. Today, Anoplotherium is thought to be a terrestrial browser with specialized behaviours.

A. commune was notably depicted in the Crystal Palace Dinosaurs attraction in the Crystal Palace Park in the United Kingdom, open to the public since 1854 and constructed by English sculptor Benjamin Waterhouse Hawkins. More specifically, three statues of A. commune were made, two of which are standing and the third of which is in a reposed position. These statues resemble hybrids of deer and big cats and measure 3.6 m (12 ft) long. Its inclusion in the Crystal Palace Park reflects the popularity and public interest in Anoplotherium in the 19th century, as it was an icon of palaeontology, geology, and natural history that it was regularly incorporated in palaeontological texts and classrooms (its popularity diminished since the 20th century).

The sculptures of A. commune were overall based on Hawkins closely following Cuvier's description of the genus based on known remains, including Cuvier's unpublished robust muscle speculations which are seen as accurate by modern-day standards. Hawkins did also deviate outside of Cuvier's descriptions, however, likely basing its facial designs and the inaccurate presence of tetradactyl limbs (four toes on each foot) instead of didactyl or tridactyl limbs on extant camelids. Besides these errors, the statues have largely been accurate to modern-day depictions of Anoplotherium.

==== Confusions with other mammal groups ====
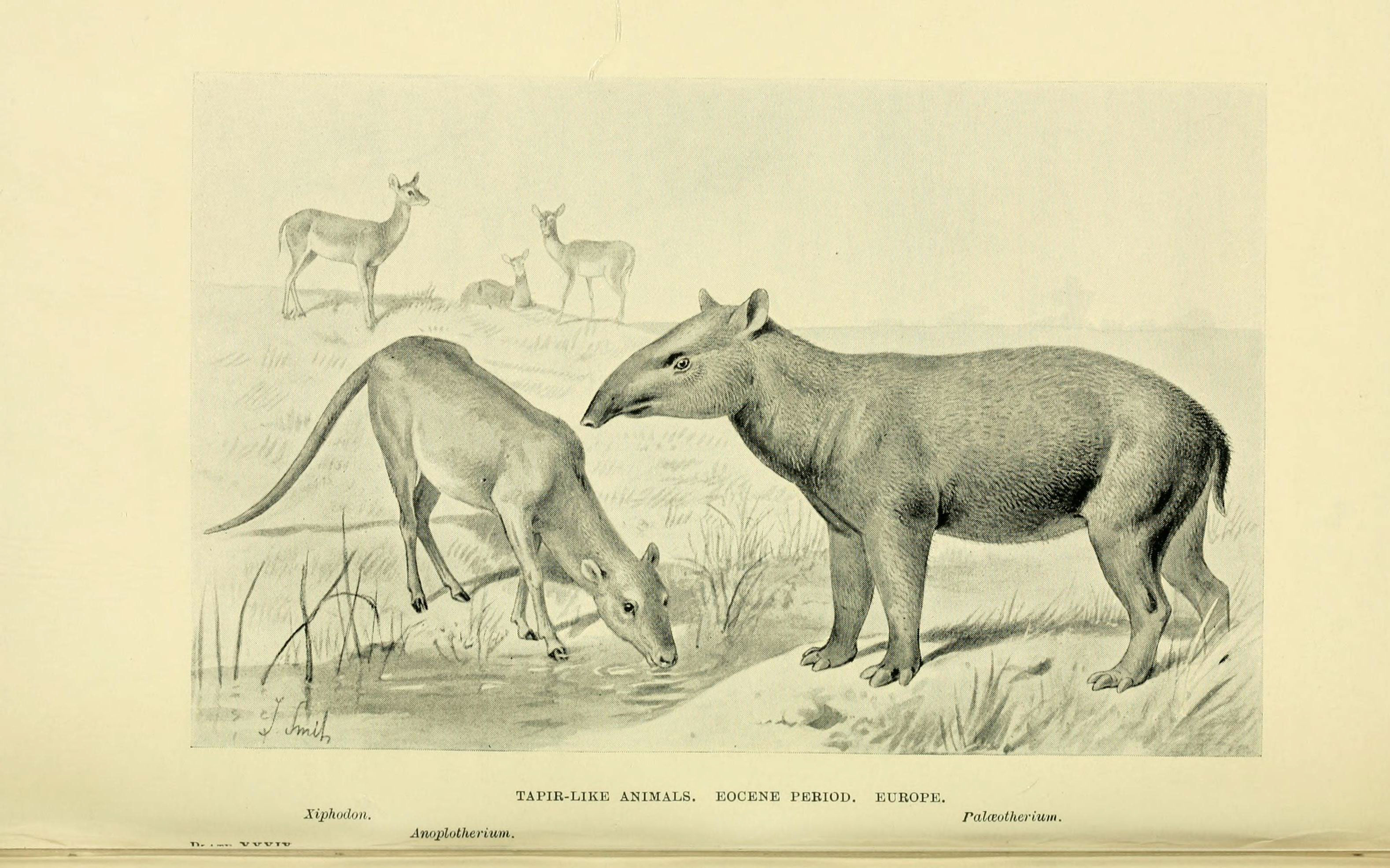
Illustrations of Anoplotherium (foreground left), Xiphodon (background left), and Palaeotherium (right)

For much of the 19th century, palaeontologists confused mammals of other families with Anoplotherium largely due to palaeontology being at its early stages. One of the earlier examples is 1822, when Cuvier erected the names A. gracile, A. murinum, A. obliquum, A. leporinum, and A. secundaria, replacing earlier species names within Anoplotherium outside of A. commune. In A. gracile, he noticed differences in the molars that he erected the subgenus Xiphodon. For A. leporinum, A. murinum, and A. obliquum, the subgenus Dichobune was created by Cuvier based on its small size. In 1848, French palaeontologist Auguste Pomel promoted the 2 subgenera to genus ranks and erected an additional genus Amphimeryx for A. murinus and A. obliquus. The revised taxonomies were followed by subsequent palaeontologists like French naturalist Paul Gervais. Therefore, the species are no longer classified as Anoplotherium but distant genera.

Other mammals initially confused with the genus Anoplotherium but eventually reclassified within the 19th century represented the endemic European artiodactyl family Cainotheriidae (Cainotherium), European and Indian subcontinental members of the perissodactyl family Chalicotheriidae (Anisodon and Nestoritherium), and even endemic South American members of the order Litopterna (Scalabrinitherium and Proterotherium).

==== Revisions within the Anoplotheriidae ====
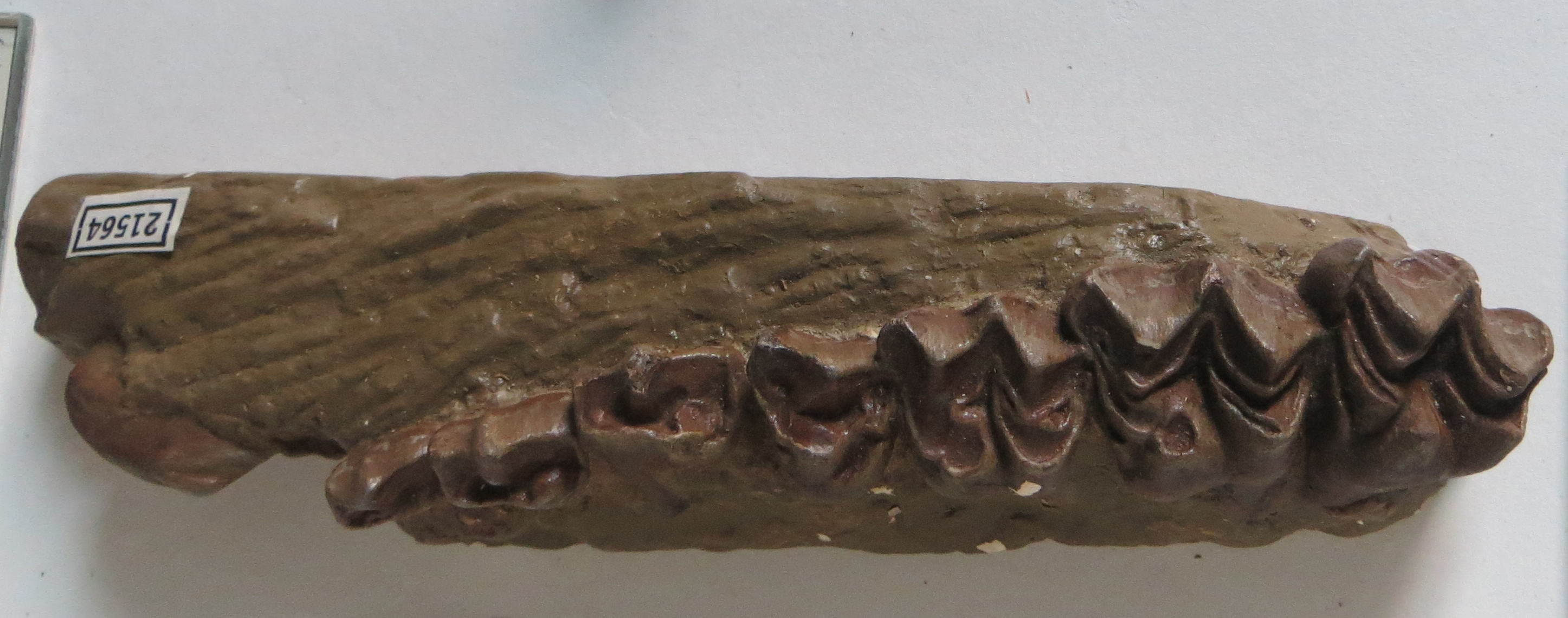
A. commune jaw fragment, Teylers Museum

In 1851, Pomel observed that Anoplotherium species could be determined as having either didactyl hooves (lessened third index) or tridactyl hooves (greater-developed third index) and that the only previously erected species that are valid are A. commune and A. secundaria. In addition, he erected three new species based on additional remains: A. duvmoyi (based on Cuvier's fossil illustrations of A. commune), A. platypus, A. laurillardi (convex incisors on the anterior surface), and A. cuvieri. A. laurillardi derives as a species name from Charles Laurillard.

French palaeontologist Paul Gervais in 1852 named the genus Eurytherium based on its presence of tridactyl hooves instead of didactyl hooves, for he made the new species E. latipis the type species and A. platypus a synonym of the former. Henri Filhol would follow Gervais by erecting E. quercyi and E. minus based on dental sizes and reclassifying A. secundarium (or A. secundaria) to Eurytherium.

In 1862, Ludwig Rütimeyer erected the subgenus Diplobune for the genus Dichobune on the basis that it was an evolutionary transition between Anoplotherium secundarium and the dichobunid. It was promoted to a distinct genus with one species D. bavaricum being placed into the genus by Oscar Fraas by 1870, however.

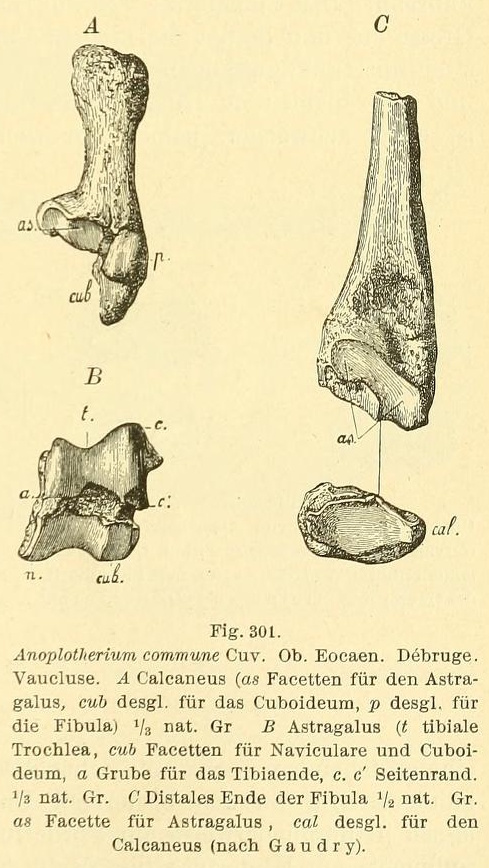
Illustrations of the calcaneum, astragalus, and partial fibula of A. commune

In 1883, Max Schlosser made Eurytherium a synonym of Anoplotherium because he argued that the limb anatomies and dentitions were specific differences in characteristics rather than major ones that defined an entire genus. Sclosser pointed out that all species of Anoplotherium in some form had three indexes despite A. commune having less developed third indexes than A. latipes. He also reinforced the idea that "A. platypus" is a synonym of A. latipes. The name A. latipes takes priority over A. platypus to the modern day because Pomel in 1851 did not list any specimen for the species, effectively making it a nomen dubium. He also mentioned that the status of A. duvmoyi was not stable due to being based on illustrations, which he considered to be a "hopeless effort". He also supported Diplobune being a valid genus in that he argued that A. secundaria should be renamed to D. secundaria based on dentition and smaller sizes. Schlosser also said that A. cuvieri was an invalid species because the diagnosis based on isolated metatarsal bones was valid-enough.

Richard Lydekker erected the species A. cayluxense in 1885 based on its smaller size and unique variations in the molar cusps. He also demoted the genus Diplobune as a synonym of Anoplotherium, meaning that the former's species were added/readded to Anoplotherium as A. secundarium, A. quercyi, A. modicum, A. bavaricum, and A. minus (= A. minor, Filhol 1877). The synonymy of Diplobune with Anoplotherium was not supported by Hans Georg Stehlin in 1910, as he argued that the former was generically distinct from the latter despite their close relations, thus restoring the previous species into Diplobune (with the exception of D. modicum, which he synonymized with D. bavarica) and adding "A. secundarium" into Diplobune as D. secundaria. He also wrote that A. cayluxense was a synonym of D. secundaria. Stehlin also tentatively referred "A." obliquum to the genus Haplomeryx as H? obliquum. As a result of the revisions, the only valid species of Anoplotherium were A. commune, A. latipes, and A. laurillardi.

In 1922, German palaeontologist Wilhelm Otto Dietrich erected the fourth species A. pompeckji from the locality of Mähringen in Germany, named in honor of German palaeontologist Josef Felix Pompeckj. The species was described as a medium-sized tridactyl species with 4-fingered front limbs and 3-toed hind limbs with slimmer hand bone proportions and a smaller astragalus. A. pompeckji is the least characterized species and has similar dentition to A. laurillardi, making its status less certain compared to the three other species.

In 1964, palaeontologist Louis de Bonis reviewed briefly the taxonomic synonyms of Anoplotherium, considering that A. duvernoyi was based on a young individual with incisor characteristics that Pomel did not specify and that A. cuvieri does not differ in metacarpal dimensions from A. laurillardi. He followed Stehlin in recognizing the three main species of Anoplotherium, although he did not mention A. pompeckji in his review.

=== Classification ===
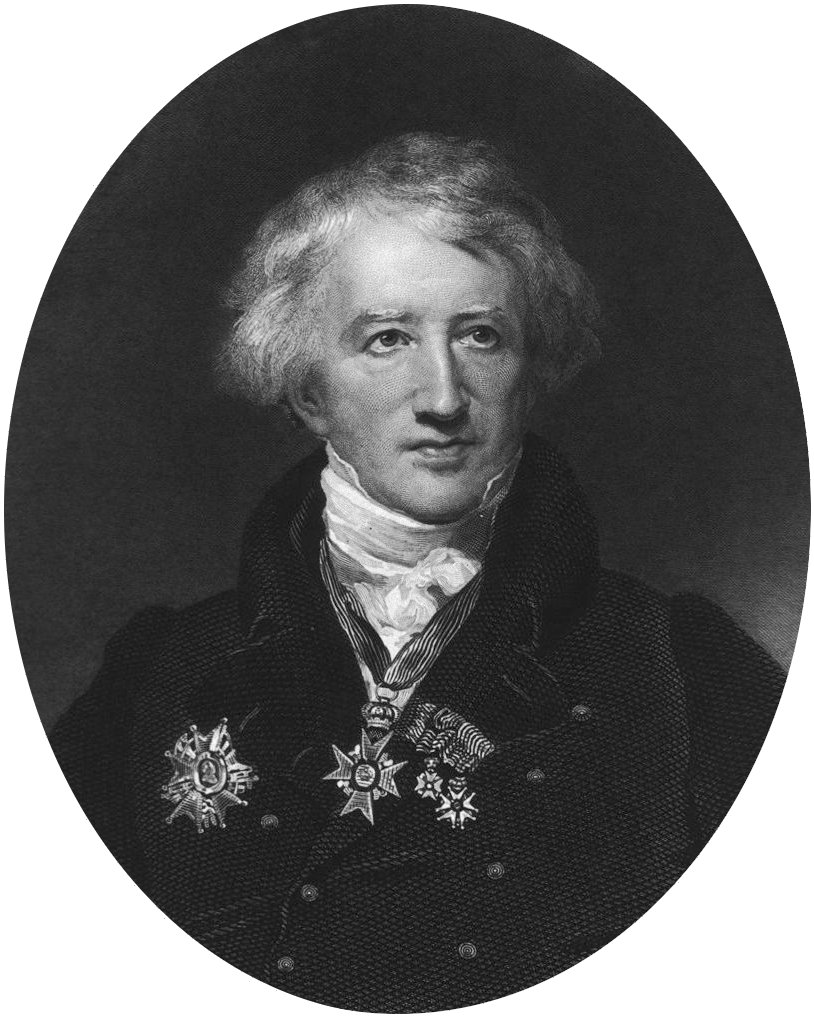
Portrait of Georges Cuvier, the French naturalist who described Palaeotherium and Anoplotherium in 1804

Anoplotherium is the type genus of the Anoplotheriidae, a Palaeogene artiodactyl family endemic to western Europe that lived from the Middle Eocene to the Early Oligocene (~44 to 30 Ma, possible earliest record at ~48 Ma). The exact evolutionary origins and dispersals of the anoplotheriids are uncertain, but they exclusively resided within the continent when it was an archipelago that was isolated by seaway barriers from other regions such as Balkanatolia and the rest of eastern Eurasia. The Anoplotheriidae's relations with other members of the Artiodactyla are not well-resolved, with some determining it to be either a tylopod (which includes camelids and merycoidodonts of the Palaeogene) or a close relative to the infraorder and some others believing that it may have been closer to the Ruminantia (which includes tragulids and other close Palaeogene relatives).

The Anoplotheriidae consists of two subfamilies, the Dacrytheriinae and Anoplotheriinae, the latter of which is the younger subfamily that Anoplotherium belongs to. The Dacrytheriinae is the older subfamily of the two that first appeared in the Middle Eocene (since the Mammal Palaeozone Zones unit MP13, possibly up to MP10), although some authors consider them to be a separate family in the form of the Dacrytheriidae. Anoplotheriines made their first appearances by the Late Eocene (MP15-MP16), or ~41-40 Ma, within western Europe with Duerotherium and Robiatherium. By MP17a-MP17b, however, there is a notable gap in the fossil record of anoplotheriines overall as the former two genera seemingly made their last appearances by the previous MP level MP16.

By MP18, Anoplotherium and Diplobune made their first appearances in western Europe, but their exact origins are unknown. The two genera were widespread throughout western Europe based on abundant fossil evidence spanning from Portugal, Spain, United Kingdom, France, Germany, and Switzerland for much of pre-Grande Coupure Europe (prior to MP21), meaning that they were typical elements of the Late Eocene up until the earliest Oligocene. The earlier anoplotheriines are considered to be smaller species whereas the later anoplotheriines were larger. Anoplotherium and Diplobune are considered the most derived (or evolutionarily recent) anoplotheriids based on dental morphology and achieved gigantism amongst non-whippomorph artiodactyls, making them some of the largest non-whippomorph artiodactyls of the Palaeogene as well as amongst the largest mammals to roam western Europe at the time (all species of Anoplotherium were large to very large whereas not all species of Diplobune were large).

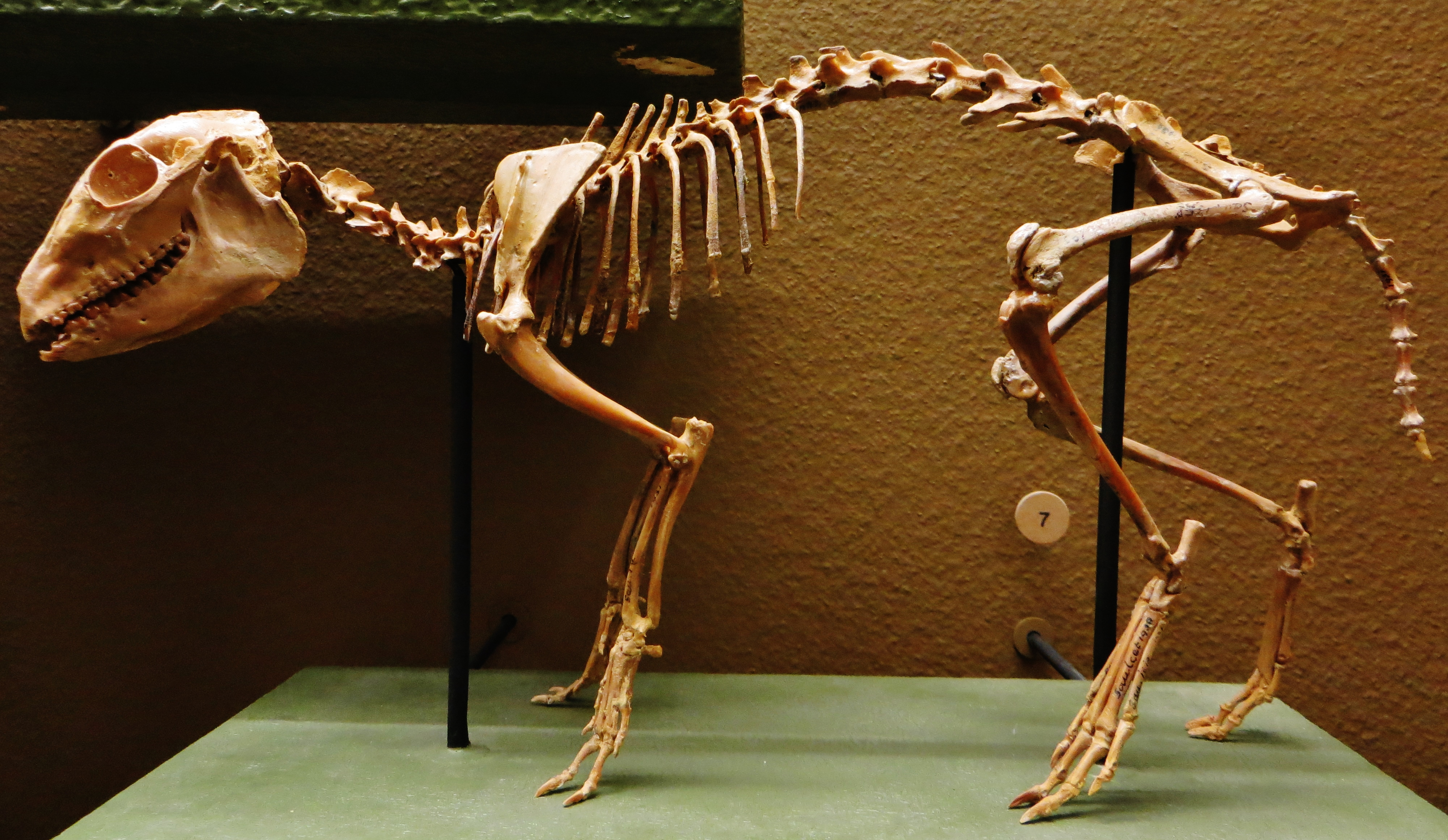
Reconstructed skeleton of the related Cainotherium

Conducting studies focused on the phylogenetic relations within the Anoplotheriidae has proven difficult due to the general scarcity of fossil specimens of most genera. The phylogenetic relations of the Anoplotheriidae as well as the Xiphodontidae, Mixtotheriidae, and Cainotheriidae have also been elusive due to the selenodont morphologies of the molars, which were convergent with tylopods or ruminants. Some researchers considered the selenodont families Anoplotheriidae, Xiphodontidae, and Cainotheriidae to be within Tylopoda due to postcranial features that were similar to the tylopods from North America in the Palaeogene. Other researchers tie them as being more closely related to ruminants than tylopods based on dental morphology. Different phylogenetic analyses have produced different results for the "derived" selenodont Eocene European artiodactyl families, making it uncertain whether they were closer to the Tylopoda or Ruminantia.

In an article published in 2019, Romain Weppe et al. conducted a phylogenetic analysis on the Cainotherioidea within the Artiodactyla based on mandibular and dental characteristics, specifically in terms of relationships with artiodactyls of the Palaeogene. The results retrieved that the superfamily was closely related to the Mixtotheriidae and Anoplotheriidae. They determined that the Cainotheriidae, Robiacinidae, Anoplotheriidae, and Mixtotheriidae formed a clade that was the sister group to the Ruminantia while Tylopoda, along with the Amphimerycidae and Xiphodontidae split earlier in the tree. The phylogenetic tree used for the journal and another published work about the cainotherioids is outlined below:

- - Eurodexis russelli
  - Dichobune leporina
  - - - Amphimeryx murinus
      - - Xiphodon castrense
        - Tylopoda
          - Paratoceras coatesi
          - Eotylopus reedi
    - - Ruminantia
        - Parvitragulus priscus
        - - Lophiomeryx chalaniati
          - Archaeomeryx optatus
      - - Mixtotheriidae
          Mixtotherium cuspidatum
        - Anoplotheriidae
          - Anoplotherium latipes
          - Dacrytherium ovinum
        - Cainotherioidea
          - Robiacinidae
            - Robiacina lavergnesis
            - - Robiacina minuta
              - Robiacina quercyi
          - Cainotheriidae
            - Palembertina deplasi
            - - Oxacroninae
                - Paroxacron bergeri
                - - Paroxacron valdense
                  - Oxacron courtoisii
              - Cainotheriinae
                - Cainotherium laticurvatum
                - - Caenomeryx
                    - Caenomeryx filholi
                    - Caenomeryx procommunis
                  - Plesiomeryx
                    - Plesiomeryx cadurcensis
                    - Plesiomeryx huerzeleri

In 2020, Vincent Luccisano et al. created a phylogenetic tree of the basal artiodactyls, a majority endemic to western Europe, from the Palaeogene. In one clade, the "bunoselenodont endemic European" Mixtotheriidae, Anoplotheriidae, Xiphodontidae, Amphimerycidae, Cainotheriidae, and Robiacinidae are grouped together with the Ruminantia. The phylogenetic tree as produced by the authors is shown below:

- Artiodactyla
  - Bunophorus
  - - Gunophorus
    - Diacodexis
  - - - Protodichobune
      - Eurodexis
    - - - Buxobune
        - - Mouillacitherium
          - Meniscodon
        - - - Hyperdichobune
            - - Dichobune robertiana
              - - Dichobune leporina
                - - Homacodon
                  - - Gobiohyus
                    - Suina
                      - - Khirtharia
                        - Entelodon
                      - - Palaeocheorus
                        - Perchoerus
          - - Haplobunodontidae
              - Haplobunodon
              - - Cuisitherium
                - Lophiobunodon
            - - Mixtotherium
              - - Robiacina
                - - - - Dacrytherium
                      - Diplobune
                    - - Xiphodon
                      - Paraxiphodon
                  - - - Cainotherium
                      - Paroxacron
                    - - Archaeomeryx
                      - - Amphimeryx
                        - Pseudamphimeryx
      - - Aumelasia
        - - - Hallebune
            - Amphirhagatherium
          - - Cebochoeridae
              - Cebochoerus
              - Gervachoerus
            - - Choeropotamus
              - Siamotherium

In 2022, Weppe created a phylogenetic analysis in his academic thesis regarding Palaeogene artiodactyl lineages, focusing most specifically on the endemic European families. The phylogenetic tree, according to Weppe, is the first to conduct phylogenetic affinities of all anoplotheriid genera, although not all individual species were included. He found that the Anoplotheriidae, Mixtotheriidae, and Cainotherioidea form a clade based on synapomorphic dental traits (traits thought to have originated from their most recent common ancestor). The result, Weppe mentioned, matches up with previous phylogenetic analyses on the Cainotherioidea with other endemic European Palaeogene artiodactyls that support the families as a clade. As a result, he argued that the proposed superfamily Anoplotherioidea, composing of the Anoplotheriidae and Xiphodontidae as proposed by Alan W. Gentry and Hooker in 1988, is invalid due to the polyphyly of the lineages in the phylogenetic analysis. However, the Xiphodontidae was still found to compose part of a wider clade with the three other groups. Anoplotherium and Diplobune compose a clade of the Anoplotheriidae because of their derived dental traits, supported by them being the latest-appearing anoplotheriids.

== Description ==
=== Size ===
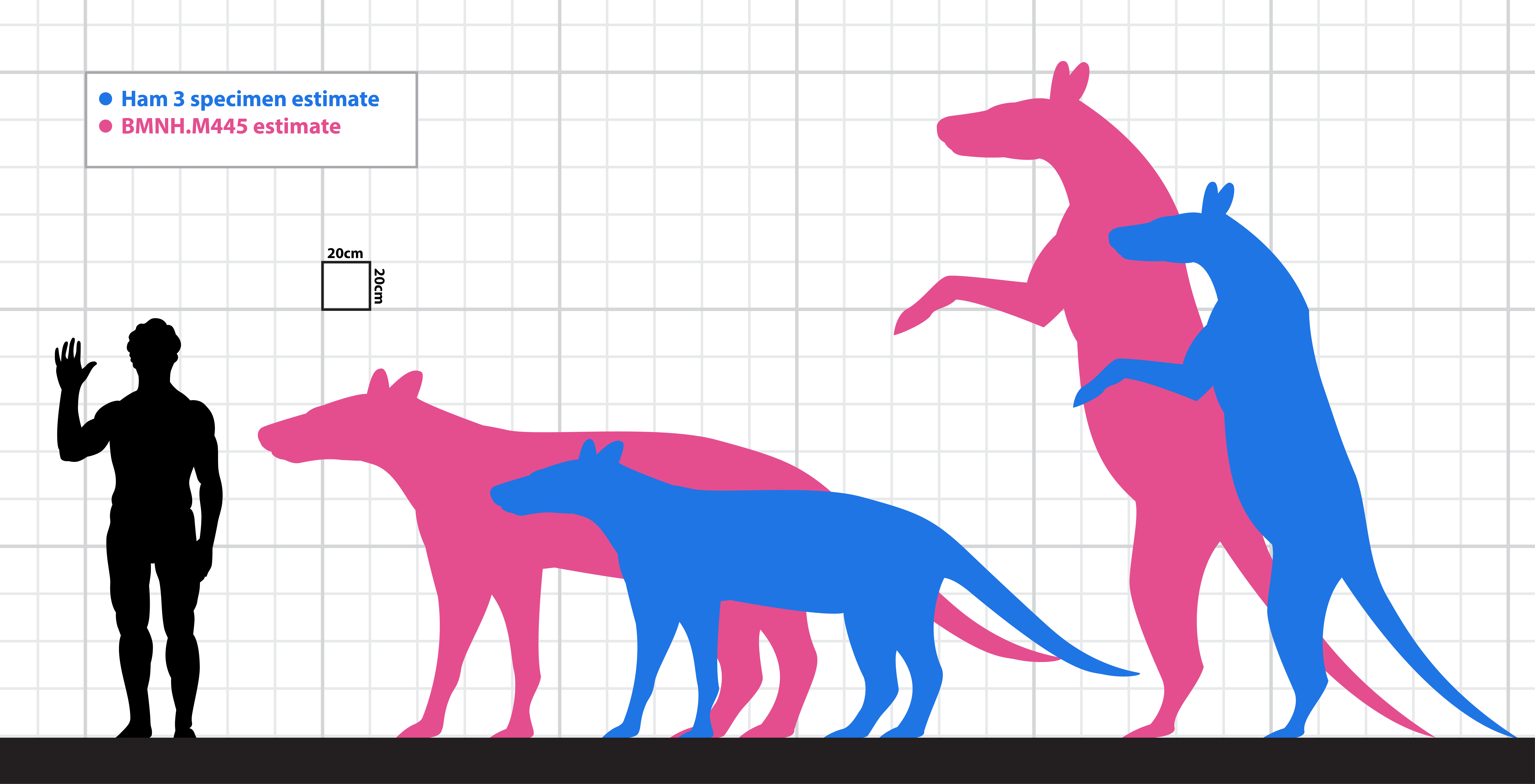
Estimated Anoplotherium size comparisons based on known fossil material

Anoplotherium species were particularly large in the Late Eocene, reaching sizes unusual for most artiodactyl groups in the Palaeogene. The large size estimates began in 1995 when Martinez and Sudre made weight estimates of Palaeogene artiodactyls based on the dimensions of their astragali and M_{1} teeth. The astragali are common bones in fossil assemblages due to their reduced vulnerability to fragmentation as a result of their stocky shape and compact structure, explaining their choice for using it. The two measurements for A. commune yielded different results, with the M_{1} giving the body mass of 312.075 kg (688.01 lb) and the astragalus yielding 265.967 kg (586.36 lb). These estimates are far larger than those of most other Palaeogene artiodactyls in the study, although the researchers pointed out that the M_{1} measurements could be overestimated compared to the astragalus estimate.

In 2014, Takehisa Tsubamoto reexamined the relationship between astragalus size and estimated body mass based on extensive studies of extant terrestrial mammals, reapplying the methods to Palaeogene artiodactyls previously tested by Sudre and Martinez. The researcher used linear measurements and their products with adjusted correction factors. The recalculations resulted in somewhat lower estimates compared to the 1995 results (with the exception of Diplobune minor, which as a shorter astragalus proportion than most other artiodactyls), displayed in the below graph:

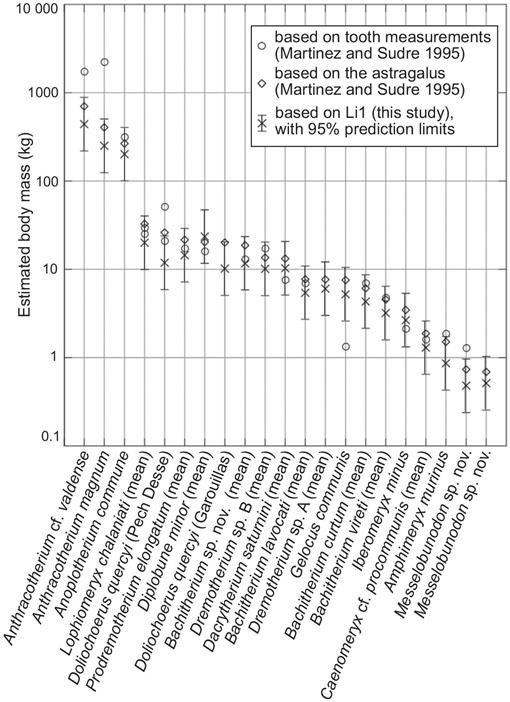
Estimated body masses (kg) of Palaeogene artiodactyls based on recalculated trochlear widths (Li1) in comparison to estimates from Martinez and Sudre (1995)

In 2022, Weppe calculated the body mass of A. commune, yielding 360 kg (790 lb). In 2023, Ainara Badiola et al. estimated that the weight of Anoplotherium ranges between 115 kg (254 lb) and 271 kg (597 lb). In their calculations, A. laurillardi was the smaller anoplotheriid that weighed on average 157 kg (346 lb). A. latipes was larger and has an average weight estimate of 229 kg (505 lb), and A. commune has the heaviest weight estimates at 271 kg (597 lb).

In 2007, Hooker made size estimates of A. latipes based on an incomplete skeleton of an immature individual from the Hamstead Member of the Bouldnor Formation in the Isle of Wight, United Kingdom. The reconstructed Hamstead level 3 individual gave size measurements of 2 m (6 ft 7 in) in head and body length. The immature Anoplotherium individual's humerus measures 330 mm (13 in) long, so the humeri of mature individuals may have measured about 410 mm (16 in) long. As a result, adult A. latipes may have measured 2.5 m (8 ft 2 in) in head and body length and 1.25 m (4 ft 1 in) in shoulder height. When standing up bipedally on its hind limbs with the back, neck and head at an angle of about 15°, the Hamstead level 3 individual might have reached 2.5 m (8 ft 2 in) when browsing while more mature A. latipes individuals might have stood just over 3 m (9.8 ft).

=== Skull ===
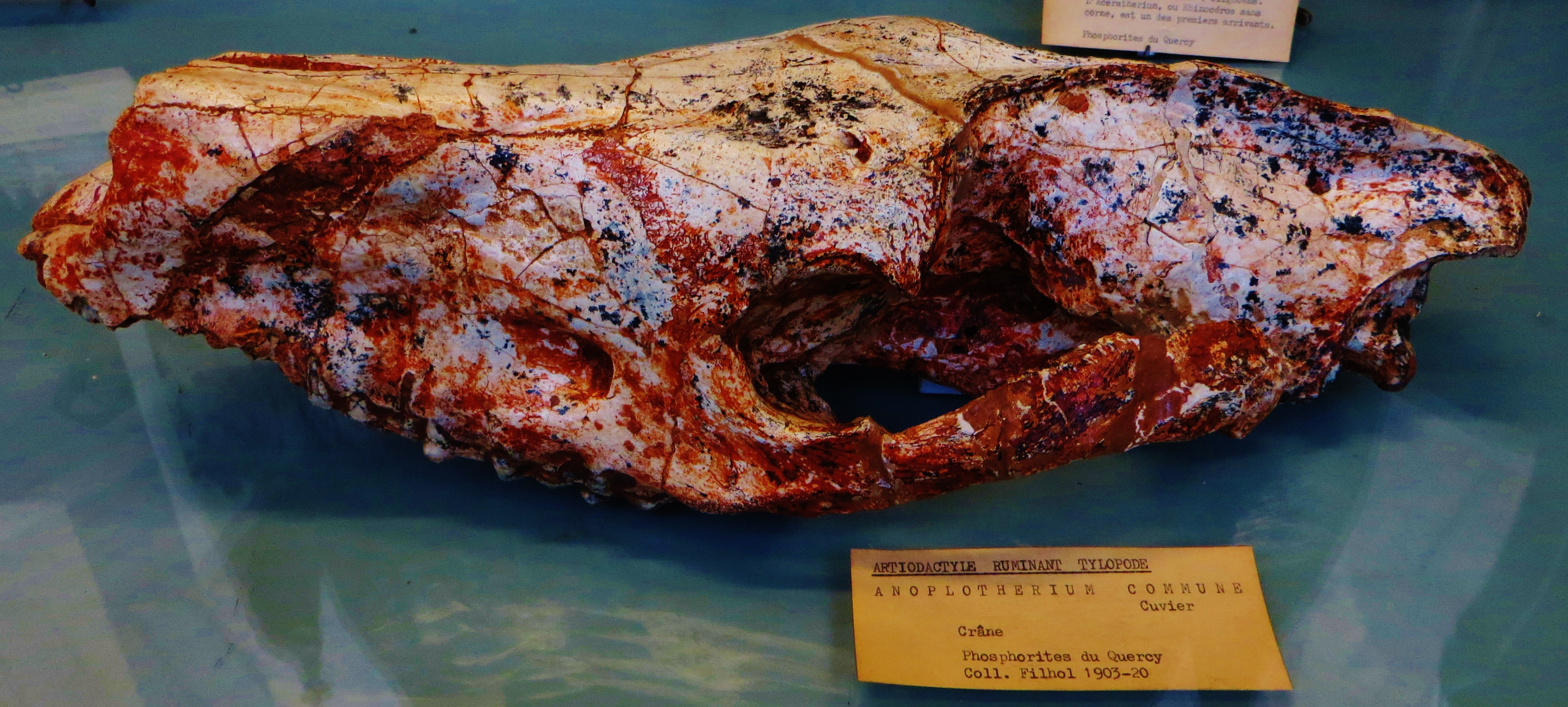
Upper part of the skull of Anoplotherium commune, National Museum of Natural History, France

The Anoplotheriidae is characterized in part by low-proportioned skulls with elongated muzzles (the muzzle aligns with the top of the cranium in the case of Anoplotherium), and orbits that are widely open from behind. The skull's upper profile is straight and nearly transversely flat from the parietal bones of the skull's back to the front area of the nasals; this trait along with another of the orbit being above the second upper molar (M^{2}) is shared with Diplobune. Anoplotheriids have large paroccipital processes, formed from the mastoid and exoccipital bones. Anoplotherium lacks lacrimal fossae unlike in dacrytheriines. The skull of Anoplotherium is narrow and elongated, with a constricted postorbital bone. It features robust sagittal and nuchal lines, the former having high elevations and emerging from low postorbital ridges and the latter having complicated elevation shifts. The back has a circular foramen magnum and large occipital condyles. The lambdoid crest is well-developed and large. The underside has an elongated palate with glenoid surfaces and strong glenoid processes of the squamosal bone. The skull's bones are robust, with the spongy diploë bone being greatly developed. The skull's strength is attributed to massive temporal muscles as part of an overall strong body build. The skull has a shallow sella turcica, a pear-shaped cranial fossa, extensive parietal bones, large squamosal bone, narrow occipital bone, and two small occipital buns for muscle attachment. Many cranial traits seen in Anoplotherium are also found in the closely related Diplobune. The nuchal lines of the occipital bone are prominent, overhanging at the skull's back. The zygomatic arch is overall straight and, at its rear, is oblique. Anoplotherium also has a narrow postglenoid process at the temporal bone and a strong and elongated jugular process at the occipital bone.

In the auditory region (including the temporal bones), the periotic bone of the inner ear is extensive, the internal auditory meatus and facial canal openings of the temporal bone being visible in the lower triangular area of the periotic bone. The tympanic part of the temporal bone is connected partially to the squamosal bone, remains separate from the periotic bone, and consists of a small but thick auditory bulla (hollow bony structure of the auditory region), which projects underneath the petrous part of the temporal bone. The mandible is elongated, its lower edge being nearly straight. The angle of the mandible is prominent and rounded. The coronoid process of the mandible is strong.

In a skull fragment of A. laurillardi with incisors and canine alveoli, the known length of the nasal region is large, measuring 38.1 mm (1.50 in). The trait of large nasals is similar to what was observed in a skull of Diplobune secundaria, which are recorded to be massive, elongated, and connected to each other and the maxilla. Cyril Gagnaison and Jean-Jacques Leroux proposed in the case of D. secundaria that the elongated nasal region supports the presence of a very tapered tongue, which similar to giraffes may have allowed it to pull plant branches.

=== Endocast anatomy ===
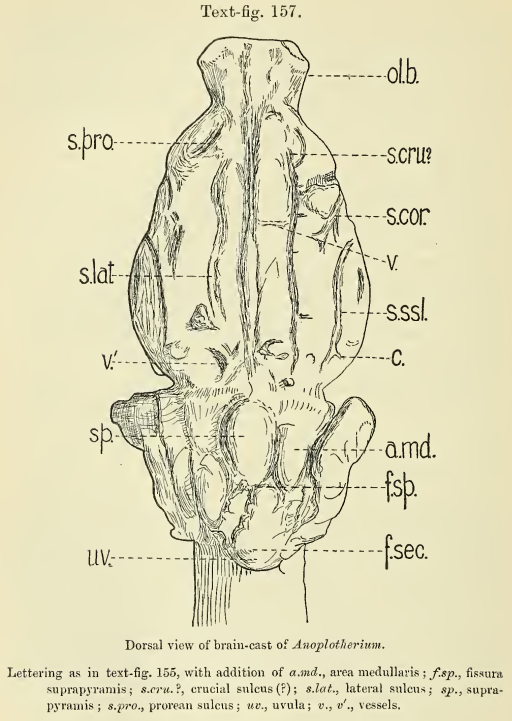
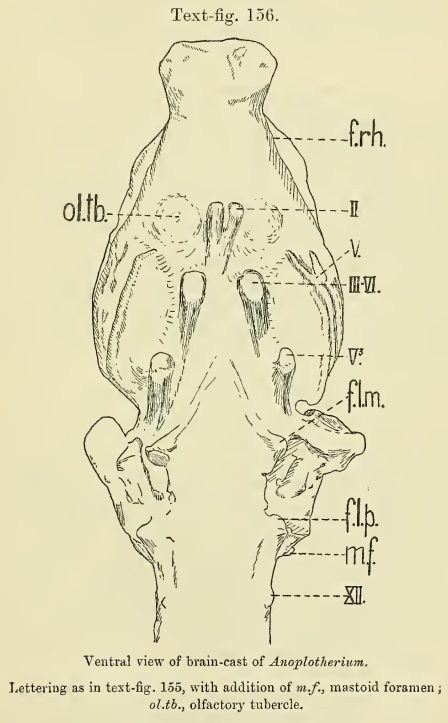
Illustrations of a brain cast of Anoplotherium in dorsal (top) and ventral (botton) views, 1913

In 1913, R.W. Palmer conducted studies on the brain cast from a cranium of Anoplotherium commune, originating from the Phosphorites of Quercy within the British Museum collections (the endocast is now in the National Museum of Natural History, France as the specimen BMNH 3753). The individual in question was estimated to have weighed 80 kg (180 lb) by its death similar to extant llamas, weighing considerably less than typical estimates of adult Anoplotherium. The total length of the brain is under 10 cm (3.9 in), its volume measuring approximately 230 ml (8.1 imp fl oz; 7.8 US fl oz).

The form of the brain is naturally narrow and elongated. The cerebellum and cerebrum are both at high positions compared to modern ungulates that have brain hemispheres located above the cerebellum. Palmer noticed that the brain was similar to the modern aardvark (Orycteropus afer). The highly-developed cerebrum that enables a strong sense of smell from Anoplotherium makes it macrosmatic (derived in sense of smell), as also indicated by the enlarged olfactory bulbs and the small size of the neocortex. In both Anoplotherium and Diplobune, the rhinal fissure divides the brain hemisphere horizontally and equally in half. The cerebellar vermis of the cerebellum is divided almost equally by the primary fissure of cerebellum (or "fissura prima").

Additionally, the olfactory bulbs are thick, and the olfactory tubercles take the form of smooth circular elevations that are curved more backwards than the aardvark and are easily noticeable. In another endocast for Anoplotherium, the olfactory bulbs compose 7.5% of the total volume of the brain, above average for both extinct and extant artiodactyls.

The neocortex area of the brain, responsible for sensory perception and other sensory brain functions, covers 28% of the medium-sized A. commune endocast's surface area. Another endocast, which belongs to Anoplotherium sp., measures 7,173.92 mm (282.438 in)^{2} in the cerebrum surface, 4,419.56 mm (173.998 in)^{2} in neopallium surface, and 416.09 cm (163.81 in)^{3} in endocranial volume. The former two data when calculated together (neopallium surface/cerebrum surface) compose 61.6% in the total neocortical surface area of the brain, meaning that adult Anoplotherium has massive brain and neocortical surface area measurements compared to most Palaeogene artiodactyls, the latter measurement being on par with or less than those of modern artiodactyls.

Anoplotherium and other anoplotheriids share traits of generally elongated and parallel sulci (shallow furrows) in the cerebral cortex, as well as a vertical (cordial) sulcus corresponding to the lateral (side) sulcus. The fissures (deep furrows) on the surface of the central area of the brain show clear formations of a complex lateral sulcus (also known as the Sylvian fissure) in a process known as operculization. The operculization of the brain of anoplotheriids is similar to the Anthracotheriidae but does not indicate any close phylogenetic relation, which means that the similarities are an instance of parallel evolution. The measurements of the endocasts of Anoplotherium are larger than those of other Palaeogene artiodactyls in a 2015 study by Ghislain Thiery and Stéphane Ducrocq.

=== Dentition ===
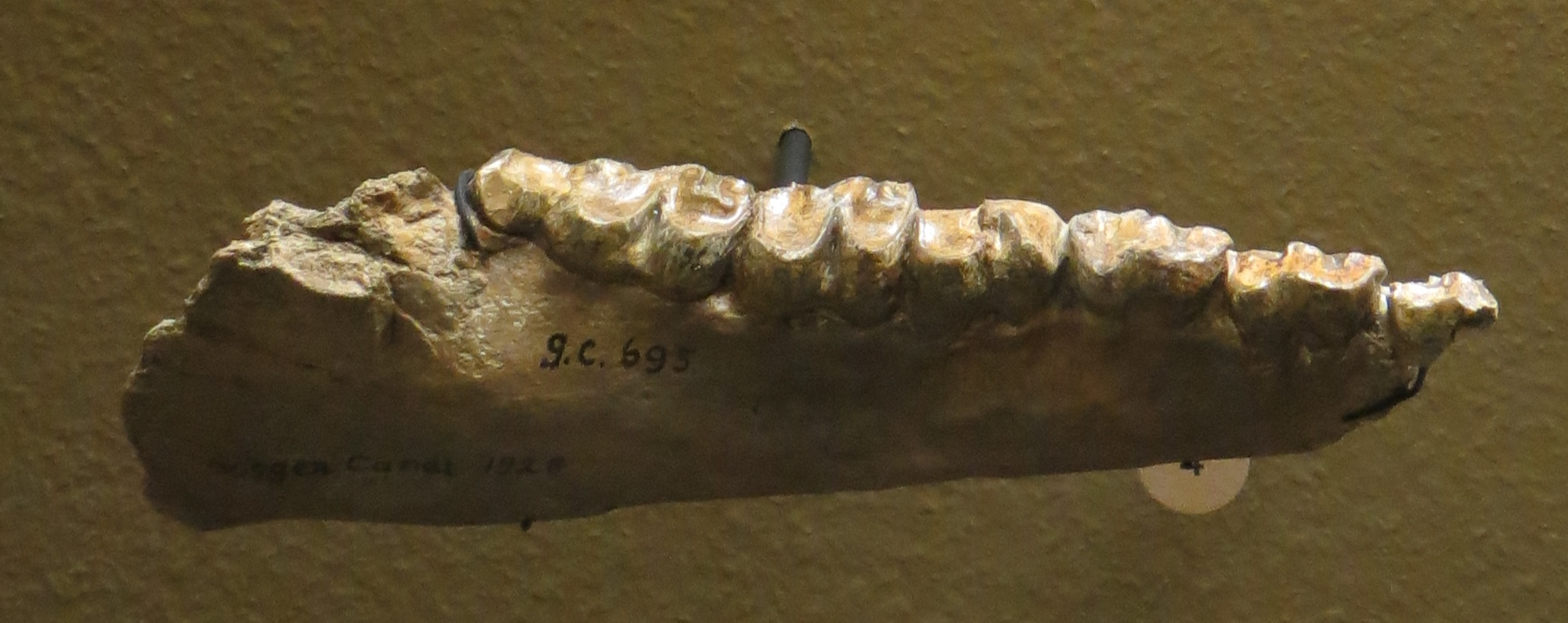
Anoplotherium laurillardi lower dental remains, Natural History Museum of Basel

Unlike most mammal fossil genera, Anoplotherium is diagnosed mainly based on postcranial morphology than dental morphology, but it does have diagnoses based on the latter. The dental formula of Anoplotherium and other anoplotheriids is 3.1.4.33.1.4.3 for a total of 44 teeth, consistent with the primitive dental formula for early-middle Palaeogene placental mammals. Anoplotheriids have selenodont (crescent-shaped ridge form) or bunoselenodont (bunodont and selenodont) premolars (P/p) and molars (M/m) made for leaf-browsing diets. The canines (C/c) of the Anoplotheriidae are overall undifferentiated from the incisors (I/i). The lower premolars of the family are piercing and elongated. The upper molars are bunoselenodont in form while the lower molars have selenodont labial cuspids and bunodont (or rounded) lingual cuspids. The subfamily Anoplotheriinae differs from the Dacrytheriinae by the lack of both molariform upper premolars with crescent-shaped paraconules and the lower molars with a third cusp between the metaconid and entoconid.

The upper molars of Anoplotherium are characterized by trapezoidal outlines in occlusal views (or top views of the tooth enamel), W-shaped ectolophs (crests or ridges of upper molar teeth), and specific differences in cusps. More specifically, the upper molars of the genus contain near-central and conical protocone cusps closely aligned with the mesostyle cusps, conical paraconules that are connected to the parastyle by posterior crests, and compressed parastyles and mesostyles. The lower molars of the anoplotheriid contains the paraconid and metaconid cusps which have pronounced separations by a valley between them.

=== Vertebrae and ribs ===
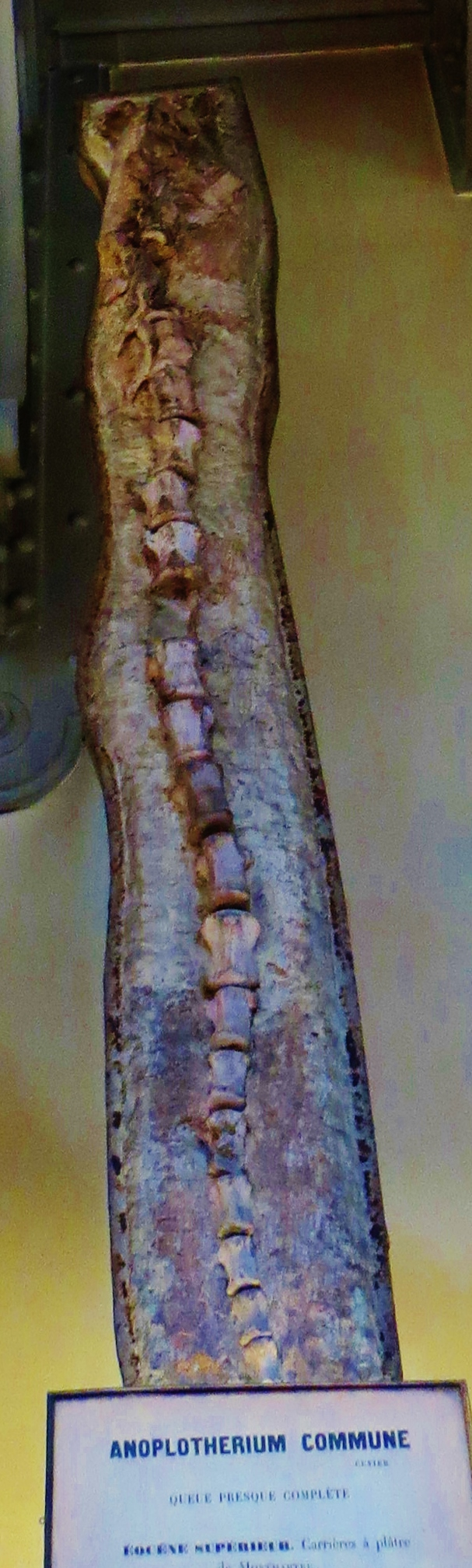
A. commune tail, NMHN, France

Anoplotherium has 7 total cervical vertebrae for a series of C1-C7, typical of most mammals. The atlas (C1) is similar to those of camelids such as Lama in form as well as the position of the "alar foramina" in association with facet joint connections involving the axis (C2). An axis that was attributed to A. commune (but also possibly belonging to its close relative Diplobune secundaria) is elongated in length and has a diminished spinous process. The vertebrae C3-C7 are analogous to Cainotherium. The C4 vertebra appears slanted, which hints towards the neck changing in orientation from vertebra C3 to C4 as a potential bending in the front area of the neck, similar to modern bears. As a result of the neck vertebrae morphology, Anoplotherium likely had a sloped, upward position of the neck.

Anoplotherium also had 12 thoracic vertebrae, 6 lumbar vertebrae, and 3 sacral vertebrae. The lumbar vertebrae, especially L4-L6, contain transverse processes that are wide, long, and point slightly towards a forward direction. The 3 sacral vertebrae are robust and contain apophyses for strong attachments to the long tail. The vertebrae of the anoplotheriid genus are built for typical ungulate movement.

The most unusual postcranial aspect of Anoplotherium compared to other artiodactyls is the long and thick tail, which is made up of 22 caudal vertebrae for strong muscle support. The frontal vertebrae had well-pronounced process, and all vertebrae except for the farthest distal ones have haemal arches on them.

Like the chalicothere Chalicotherium and unlike other mammals like caprines of the genus Ovis and Cainotherium, the ribs curve in wider areas and their tubercles do not project as much in the dorsal direction. The ribs of Anoplotherium form a barrel-shaped trunk, meaning that the rib cage is much wider than those of modern ruminants. The ribs generally project sideways due to the very curved positions of them, the position of the tubercle, and the thoracic vertebrae projecting on the upper sides.

=== Limbs ===
Anoplotherium has short limbs and is thought to have been unguligrade in limb positions, with most species having three toes on both their front and hind limbs. A. commune is differentiated from the similar A. latipes as well as A. laurillardi by its didactyl ("two-toed") as opposed to tridactyl ("three-toed") digits.

==== Front limbs ====
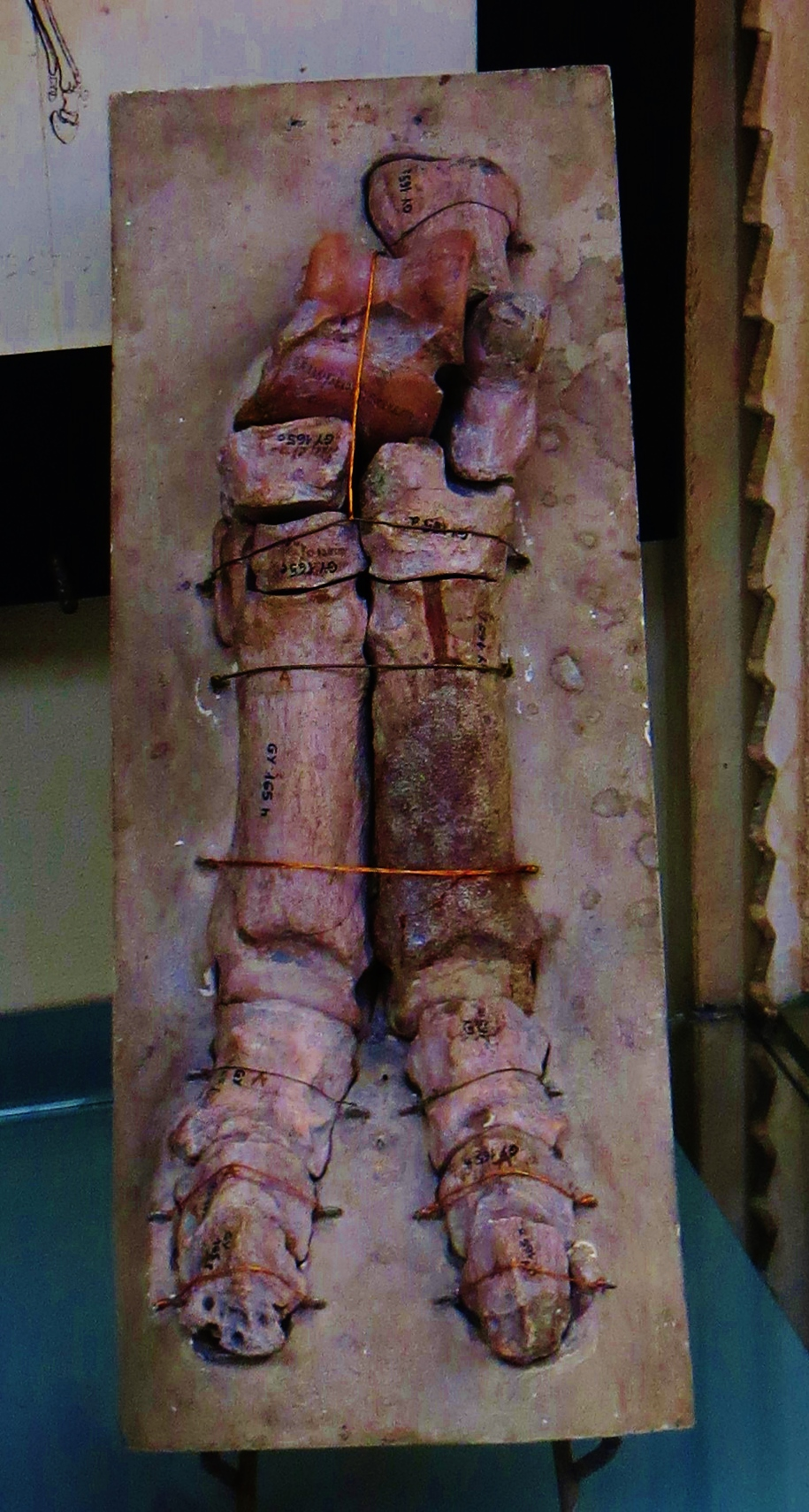
Foot of A. commune at the National Museum of Natural History, France

The scapula (or shoulder blade) has a convex coracoid border and is similar to that of Diplobune. Similar to camels (Camelus), the supraspinous fossa is broader than the infraspinous fossa, but camels have narrower scapulae, especially in distal (back) ends of the supraspinous fossa. The scapular spine is robust, thick, and gradually rises in height distally up until it reaches the edge of the glenoid cavities like camels but unlike most other modern artiodactyls. The coracoid process (normally resembling a small hooklike structure) is reduced to a blunt knob that only slightly projects. The wide supraspinous fossa and broadly curved coracoid edge of the scapulae of Anoplotherium are unlike Cainotherium and Merycoidodon because Anoplotherium shares neither any triangular shape of the shoulder blades nor narrow supraspinous fossae.

The elbow morphology of Anoplotherium, based on the structures and articulations of elbow bones like the humerus, radius, and ulna, shows evidence of adaptations to moving the elbow up and down in supination-pronation rotations by 13° maximum. A fully extended elbow could make an angle between the ulna and humerus that measures approximately 135°, indicating high flexibility compared to other artiodactyls, including the already semi-flexible elbows of Cainotherium.

Similar in wrist morphology to pigs of the genus Sus, the hooves of Anoplotherium spread out by ~16° when downward, supported by footprint morphology. The wrist may have been able to rotate up and down but only to a limited degree and nowhere near the flexible wrist morphologies of primates, suggesting that the adaptation was not a main feature of the artiodactyl genus but the result of regaining a primitive trait.

The carpus consists of the scaphoid, lunate, triquetrum, and pisiform in its first row and the trapezium, trapezoid, capitate, and hamate in its second. Anoplotherium has four digit bones, but those of digit V and, in the case of A. commune, digit II are poorly developed. The second finger (digit II) of Anoplotherium has no capability of rotation or flexible movements, which signifies that it does not play any thumb-like role like in primates or the giant panda.

==== Hind limbs ====
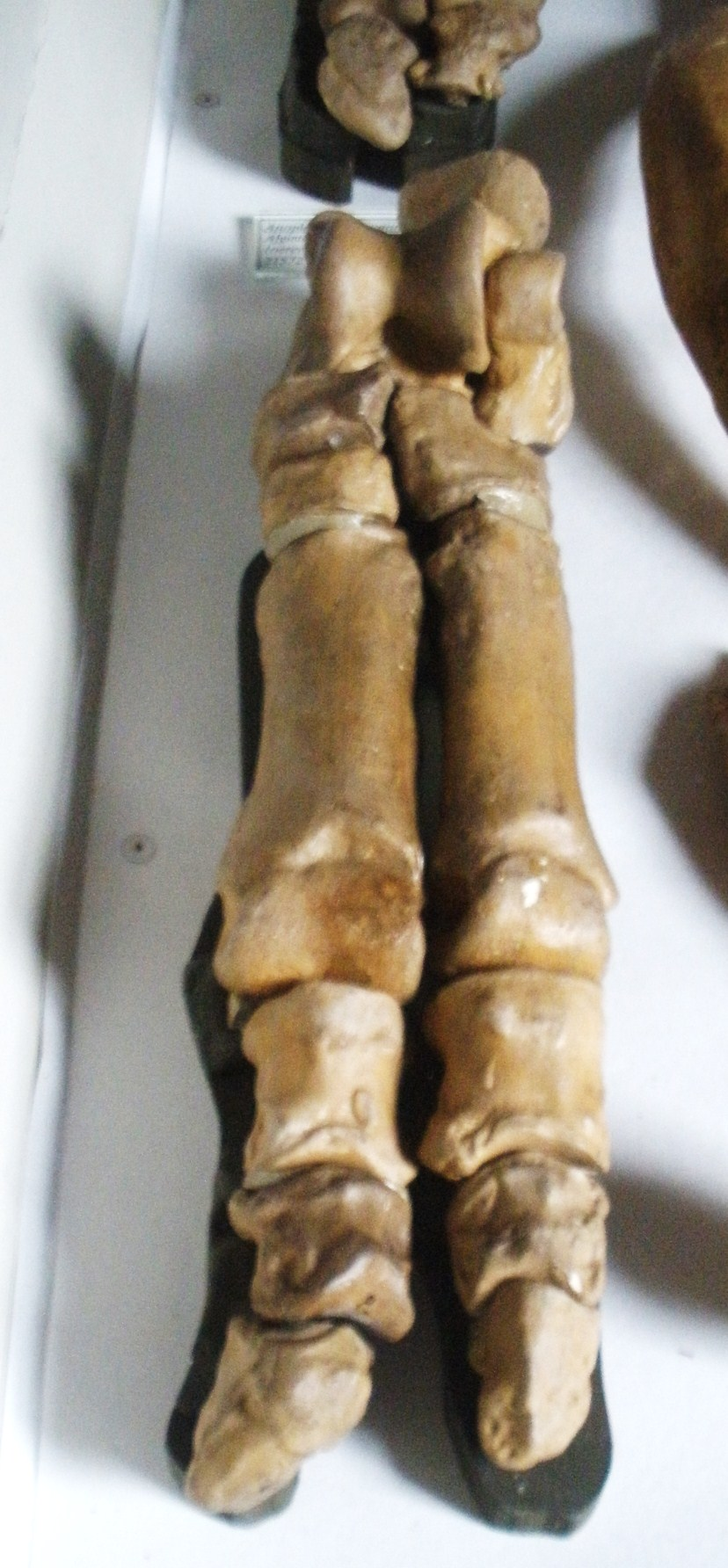
A. commune foot, Teylers Museum

The ilium, part of the hip bone of the greater pelvis bone, is broad and has a firmly rounded iliac crest that meets with the concave underside edge at a sharp angle. The ilium of Anoplotherium can be differentiated from Palaeotherium by the shorter iliac body, the longer ischium (the lower and back area of the hip bone), and a straighter back edge of pelvis that results in a longer pubic symphysis. The acetabular fossa region of the acetabulum surface of the pelvis is large, its acetabular notch being in a posterior (or back) position similar to that in Chalicotherium.

The femur is larger than the tibia, has only two trochanters similar to other basal artiodactyls, has a narrow gap between its femoral head and greater trochanter, and has a long femoral neck. The trochanteric fossa, a hollow at the surface of the greater trochanter, is wide in depth and narrow in shape, deepening by the sides. The tibia is robust, strongly supporting muscle attachments based on its crests and processes. The distal end of the fibula plus the medial malleolus prominence of the tibia enclose the center area of the astragalus in order to prevent it from moving sideways.

Anoplotheriids with known postcranial fossils have proportionally wide, stocky, and oblique astragali (or talus or ankle bone), differing widely from other artiodactyls. A. latipes differs from A. commune in part by morphologies of the facets plus fossae of the astragalus and a shorter and more robust calcaneum (heel bone). The astragali of anoplotheres share levels of elevations and positions of specific facets with the merycoidodonts that no modern artiodactyls share, possibly an instance of convergent evolution. The medial (sustentacular) facet of Anoplotherium and Diplobune is concave, contrasting with the flat to slightly convex facet of Dacrytherium.

The tarsus consists of the navicular, three cueniform bones, and a cuboid bone. The foot of A. commune consisted of two toes, as indicated by the relatively small outermost and middle cuneiform bones.

=== Footprints ===
Large-sized footprints from southern France and north Spain that date to the Late Eocene may have been from Anoplotherium. The ichnogenus is named Anoplotheriipus and was first described from the department of Gard in France by Paul Ellenberger in 1980. The derivation of the genus name refers to the ichnotaxon being closest in affinity to the Anoplotheriidae. The ichnogenus is diagnosed as belonging to a very large artiodactyl, the autopod area exceeding that of A. commune by ~33%, the subparallel position of the two hooves, and the posterior area of the pedal sole being as transversely wide as the anterior area of the pedal sole. Anoplotheriipus is round to rectangular in shape with broad and anteriorly-pronounced cloven digit imprints that resemble poorly-preserved camel tracks. The similar artiodactyl ichnogenus Diplartiopus differs from it by the parallelism of the two fingers that are more elongated.

The type species is Anoplotheriipus lavocati, which Ellenberger named in honor of palaeontologist René Lavocat and considered the "most majestic" of the three ichnospecies due to the displayed specific mobility of the metatarsals. It measures 170 mm (6.7 in) to 180 mm (7.1 in) in length and 120 mm (4.7 in) in width, is stocky in shape, and measures 12° in toe divergence. The two fingers are nearly equal in length and, at minimum, measure 115 mm (4.5 in) without the metatarsal bones being taken into account and 225 mm (8.9 in) with the metatarsals. The measurements are considerably higher than typical measurements of the toes of A. commune, which are 85 mm (3.3 in) without the metatarsals and 170 mm (6.7 in) with.

Anoplotheriipus similicommunis, deriving in species etymology from "similis" (similar in Latin) and A. commune, is similar to the type ichnospecies but is smaller, corresponding more directly to typical foot measurements of A. commune by its length of 140 mm (5.5 in) and width of 105 mm (4.1 in). The angle of divergence between the two main toes is 10°, and the minimum lengths of the fingers are 90 mm (3.5 in) without the metatarsals and 180 mm (7.1 in) with.

Anoplotheriipus compactus is the third ichnospecies, which in species etymology derives from the Latin word "compactus" meaning "compact" in English due to the short and rounded autopod. It has a less definitive diagnosis compared to the other two ichnotaxa but is similar in size to A. similicommunis and has a nearly circular pedal sole for supporting slightly shorter fingers. Its length is 120 mm (4.7 in) while the width is 100 mm (3.9 in), and the finger lengths measure 70 mm (2.8 in) - 80 mm (3.1 in) without the metatarsals and 140 mm (5.5 in) - 150 mm (5.9 in) with. The footprints may have been produced by A. latipes although the answer is still uncertain.

== Palaeobiology ==
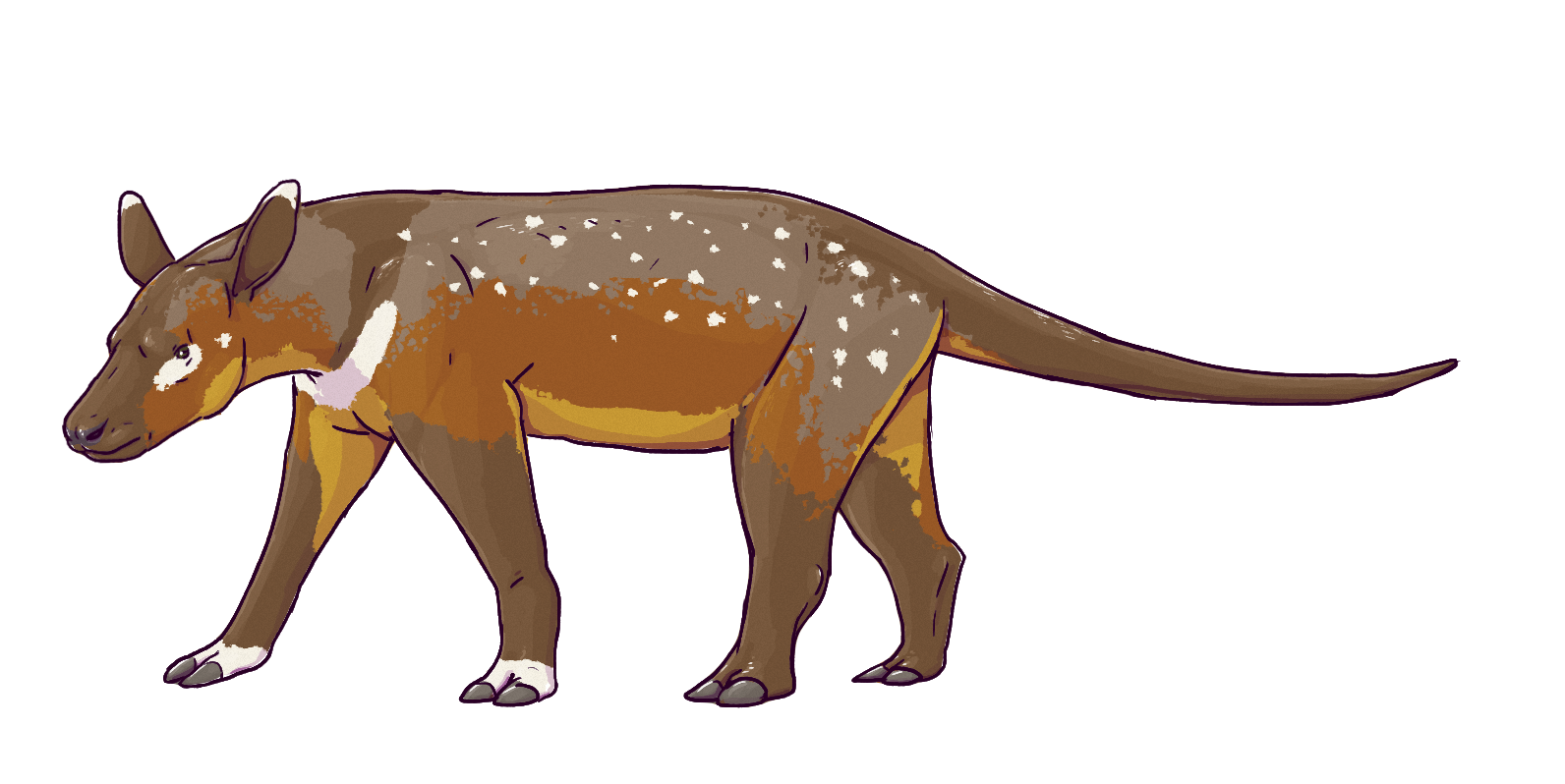
Reconstruction of A. commune in a quadrupedal position

Since 2007, Anoplotherium is thought to have been a quadruped that could have stood on its hind legs as a bipedal browser thanks to the strong pelvis, long and robust tail for balance, and splayed hind legs. The bipedal adaptations show some instance of convergence with other animals like chalicotheres, various genera of ground sloths, giant pandas (Ailuropoda melanoleuca), gorillas (Gorilla), and the gerenuk (Litocranius walleri). Otherwise, the general body form appears to resemble those of the Canidae. As a result of the bend C3-C4 cervical vertebrae, the neck and head could have maintained horizontal orientations while standing bipedally. The forelimbs could have extended horizontally beyond the snout while the individual stood bipedally, although it could not have reached upward and did not have claws or prehensile organs on the manus unlike Chalicotherium. Therefore, the forearms may have not been used for ripping and tearing plants but as bipedal support. It may have browsed while standing up at a steep angle more comparable to the gerenuk than to Chalicotherium.

Its large size and ability to bipedally browse may have given Anoplotherium few sources of terrestrial competition other than from Palaeotherium magnum, a large-sized palaeothere with a long neck that may have reached 240.3 kg (530 lb) in body mass. The subspecies P. magnum magnum would have reached just over 2 m (6 ft 7 in) in browsing height in quadruped stance, and there is no evidence for any bipedal adaptation in palaeotheres. Anoplotherium likely engaged in degrees of niche partitioning with the Late Eocene palaeotheres and Diplobune. While all were folivorous browsers, the palaeotheres Plagiolophus and Palaeotherium may have had small degrees of frugivory while Diplobune was likely adapted to arborealism. How well-adapted Anoplotherium was to abrasive leaves and drier but still subhumid conditions in the Late Eocene is not well-known and requires future research in dentition for answers.

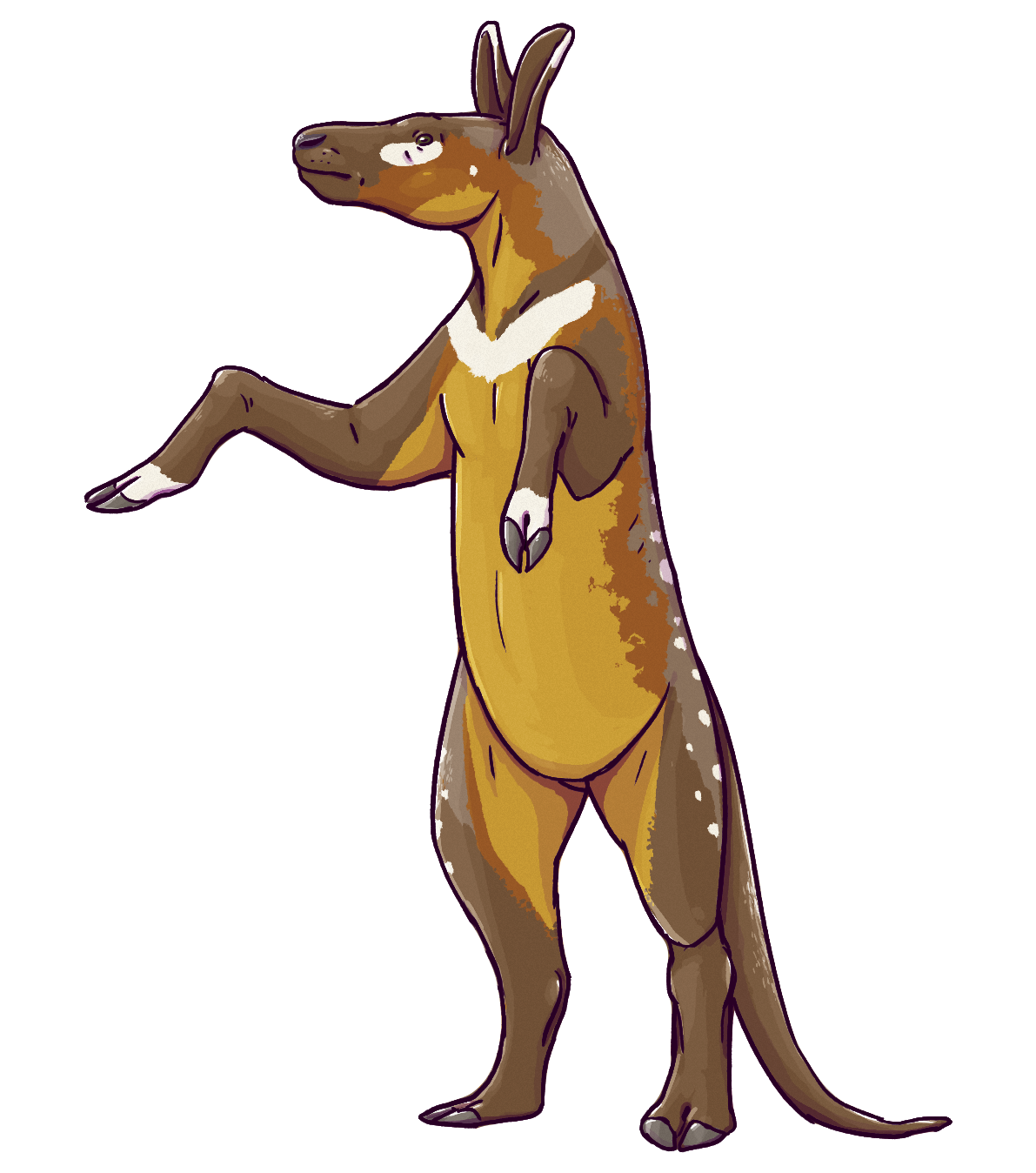
Reconstruction of A. commune in a bipedal position, most likely to browse on taller vegetation

Hooker proposed the possibility that the didactyl A. commune and tridactyl A. latipes may have been sexual dimorphs of the same species (in which A. latipes would be a synonym of A. commune). There are little consistent differences in dental morphology between the two species, with any small differences potentially accounting for individual variations. The differences in toe number between the species may have reflected A. latipes being three-toed and A. commune being two-toed. The palaeontologist explained that while there is no evidence for the extra digit touching the ground while the individual was walking, the extra digit of A. latipes may have served as extra balance while browsing bipedally.

The third digit might have also served as part of sparring in intraspecific competition between male individuals. However, he noted that despite the apparent "advantage" of A. latipes in bipedal browsing, there is no evidence of sexual differences in dietary behaviours or preferences. In addition, both species are found in the same localities of Bouldnor in the United Kingdom plus La Débruge and Montmartre in France, that although A. latipes is more common in La Débruge than Montmartre, this may be the results of behavioural and/or taphonomic factors. Grégoire Métais expressed being unconvinced that the third toe of A. latipes is a sexually dimorphic adaptation for bipedal browsing, instead suggesting that they were used in male sparring if A. latipes and A. commune were sexual dimorphs.

Some evidence of the morphologies of Anoplotherium have been criticized by some sources. In their study of the morphology of the gerenuk that allows for bipedal, researchers Matt Cartmill and Kaye Brown argued that several postcranial features that were supposedly adaptations of Litocranius and other bipedal genera does not distinguish the gerenuk from other bovids. Ciaran Clark et al. (including J.J. Hooker) found from micro-CT scans that Anoplotherium being a facultative bipedal browser was not supported by the trabecular architecture of the proximal area of the femur. This may have been the result of poor data results from the micro-CT scans and the smaller sample size, which higher-contrast micro-CT data may better answer in postural information.

The footprint track patterns of Anoplotheriipus suggest that Anoplotherium walked in very similar movement speeds as each other. Based on groupings of the footprint ichnotaxon within the locality of Fondota in the municipality of Abiego in Spain, Anoplotherium may have commonly walked in small groups which may imply some gregarious (or sociable) behaviour.

== Palaeoecology ==
=== Early pre–Grande Coupure Europe ===
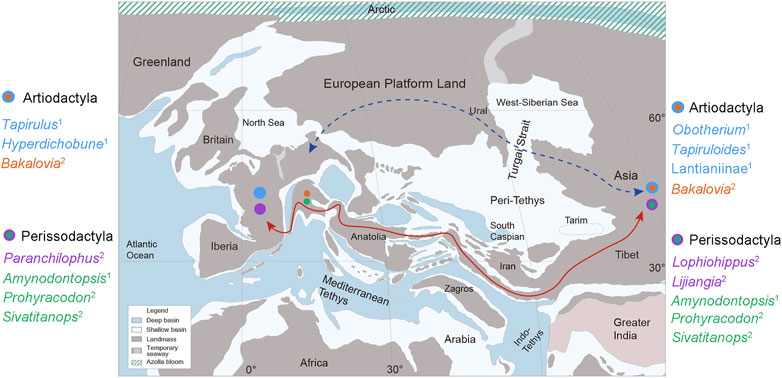
Palaeogeography of Europe and Asia during the Middle Eocene with possible artiodactyl and perissodactyl dispersal routes.

For much of the Eocene, a hothouse climate with humid, tropical environments with consistently high precipitations prevailed. Modern mammalian orders including the Perissodactyla, Artiodactyla, and Primates (or the suborder Euprimates) appeared already by the Early Eocene, diversifying rapidly and developing dentitions specialized for folivory. The omnivorous forms mostly either switched to folivorous diets or went extinct by the Middle Eocene (47–37 million years ago) along with the archaic "condylarths". By the Late Eocene (approx. 37–33 mya), most of the ungulate form dentitions shifted from bunodont (or rounded) cusps to cutting ridges (i.e. lophs) for folivorous diets.

Land connections between western Europe and North America were interrupted around 53 Ma. From the Early Eocene up until the Grande Coupure extinction event (56–33.9 mya), western Eurasia was separated into three landmasses: western Europe (an archipelago), Balkanatolia (in-between the Paratethys Sea of the north and the Neotethys Ocean of the south), and eastern Eurasia. The Holarctic mammalian faunas of western Europe were therefore mostly isolated from other landmasses including Greenland, Africa, and eastern Eurasia, allowing for endemism to develop. Therefore, the European mammals of the Late Eocene (MP17–MP20 of the Mammal Palaeogene zones) were mostly descendants of endemic Middle Eocene groups.

The appearances of derived anoplotheriines by MP18 occurred long after the extinction of the endemic European perissodactyl family Lophiodontidae in MP16, including the largest lophiodont Lophiodon lautricense, likely the result of a shift from humid and highly tropical environments to drier and more temperate forests with open areas and more abrasive vegetation. The surviving herbivorous faunas shifted their dentitions and dietary strategies accordingly to adapt. The environments were still subhumid and full of subtropical evergreen forests, however. The Palaeotheriidae was the sole remaining European perissodactyl group, and frugivorous-folivorous or purely folivorous artiodactyls became the dominant group in western Europe. MP16 also marked the last appearances of most European crocodylomorphs, of which the alligatoroid Diplocynodon was the only survivor due to seemingly adapting to the general decline of tropical climates of the Late Eocene.

=== Late Eocene ===
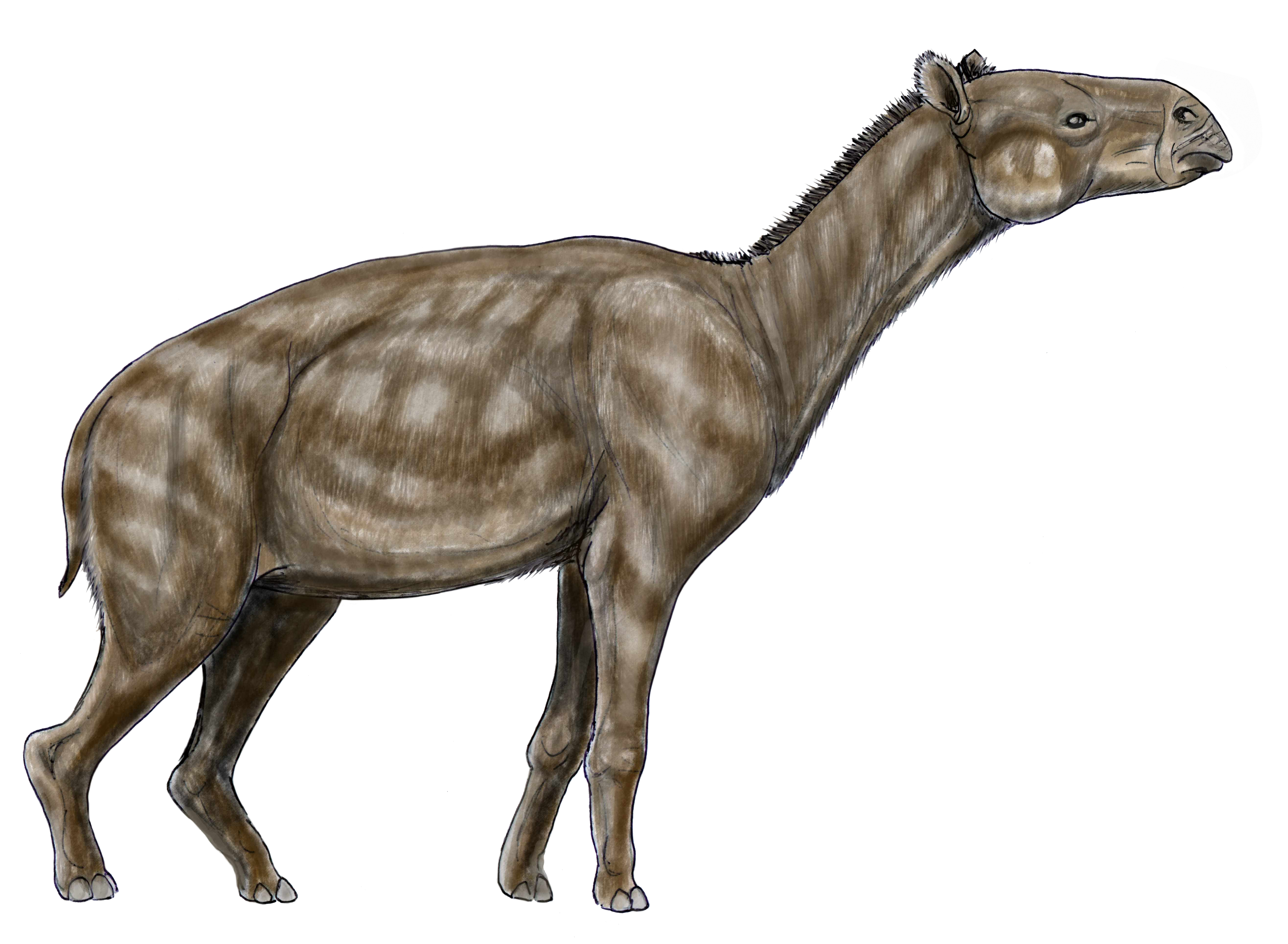
Restoration of Palaeotherium magnum, which coexisted with Anoplotherium

After a considerable gap in anoplotheriine fossils in MP17a and MP17b, the derived anoplotheriines Anoplotherium and Diplobune made their first known appearances in the MP18 unit. They were exclusive to the western European archipelago, but their exact origins and dispersal routes are unknown. By then, Anoplotherium and Diplobune lived in Central Europe (then an island) and the Iberian Peninsula, only the former genus of which later dispersed into southern England by MP19 due to the apparent lack of ocean barriers. Whereas A. latipes and A. commune had temporal ranges lasting from MP18 up to MP21, A. laurillardi was recorded from MP18 to MP20 and A. pompeckji from MP19 to MP21.

Anoplotherium coexisted with a wide diversity of artiodactyls in western Europe by MP18, ranging from the more widespread Dichobunidae, Tapirulidae, and Anthracotheriidae to many other endemic families consisting of the Xiphodontidae, Choeropotamidae, Cebochoeridae, Amphimerycidae, and Cainotheriidae. Anoplotherium also coexisted with the Palaeotheriidae, the remaining perissodactyl family of western Europe. Late Eocene European groups of the clade Ferae represented predominantly the Hyaenodonta (Hyaenodontinae, Hyainailourinae, and Proviverrinae) but also contained Carnivoramorpha (Miacidae) and Carnivora (small-sized Amphicyonidae). Other mammal groups present in the Late Eocene of western Europe represented the leptictidans (Pseudorhyncocyonidae), primates (Adapoidea and Omomyoidea), eulipotyphlans (Nyctitheriidae), chiropterans, herpetotheriids, apatotherians, and endemic rodents (Pseudosciuridae, Theridomyidae, and Gliridae). The alligatoroid Diplocynodon, present only in Europe since the upper Paleocene, coexisted with pre-Grande Coupure faunas as well. In addition to snakes, frogs, and salamandrids, rich assemblage of lizards are known in western Europe as well from MP16-MP20, representing the Iguanidae, Lacertidae, Gekkonidae, Agamidae, Scincidae, Helodermatidae, and Varanoidea.

In the MP18 locality of Zambrana in Spain, A. laurillardi and A. sp. remains were found with undetermined frog and squamate groups, alligatoroid Diplocynodon, the herpetotheriid Peratherium, rodents (Theridomys, Elfomys, Pseudoltinomys, Remys), omomyid Microchoerus, carnivoraformes Quercygale and Paramiacis, dichobunid Dichobune, xiphodonts Xiphodon and Haplomeryx, and palaeotheres (Palaeotherium, Leptolophus, Iberolophus, Pachynolophus, Paranchilophus).

As part of a separate landmass at the time, La Débruge of France, dating to MP18, yielded slightly different faunas that coexisted with A. commune, A. latipes, and A. laurillardi, namely the herpetotheriid Peratherium, rodents (Blainvillimys, Theridomys, Plesiarctomys, Glamys), hyaenodonts (Hyaenodon and Pterodon), amphicyonid Cynodictis, palaeotheres (Plagiolophus, Anchilophus, Palaeotherium), dichobunid Dichobune, choeropotamid Choeropotamus, cebochoerids Cebochoerus and Acotherulum, anoplotheriids Dacrytherium and Diplobune, tapirulid Tapirulus, xiphodonts Xiphodon and Dichodon, cainothere Oxacron, amphimerycid Amphimeryx, and anthracothere Elomeryx.

== Extinction ==
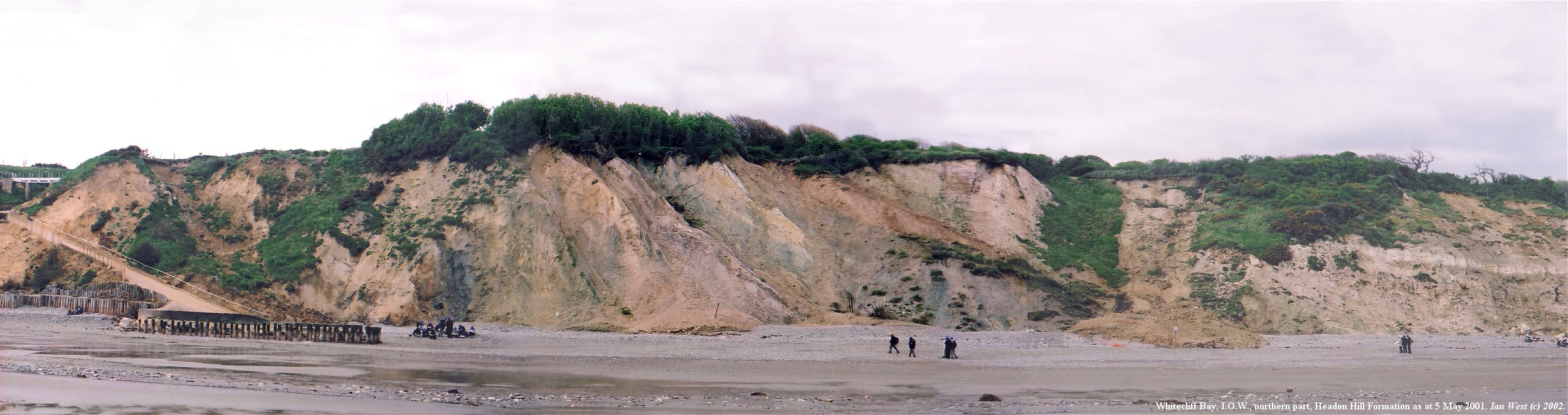
A panorama of the Headon Hill Formation in the Isle of Wight, from which Anoplotherium material has been collected. The stratigraphy of it and the Bouldnor Formation led to better understandings of faunal chronologies from the Late Eocene up to the Grande Coupure.

The Grande Coupure event during the latest Eocene to earliest Oligocene (MP20-MP21) is one of the largest and most abrupt faunal turnovers in the Cenozoic of Western Europe and coincident with climate forcing events of cooler and more seasonal climates. The event led to the extinction of 60% of western European mammalian lineages, which were subsequently replaced by Asian immigrants. The Grande Coupure is often dated directly to the Eocene-Oligocene boundary at 33.9 Ma, although some estimate that the event began slightly later, at 33.6–33.4 mya. The event occurred during or after the Eocene-Oligocene transition, an abrupt shift from a hot greenhouse world that characterised much of the Palaeogene to a coolhouse/icehouse world from the Early Oligocene onwards. The massive drop in temperatures results from the first major expansion of the Antarctic ice sheets that caused drastic pCO_{2} decreases and an estimated drop of ~70 m (230 ft) in sea level.

Many palaeontologists agree that glaciation and the resulting drops in sea level allowed for increased migrations between Balkanatolia and western Europe. The Turgai Strait, which once separated much of Europe from Asia, is often proposed as the main European seaway barrier prior to the Grande Coupure, but some researchers challenged this perception recently, arguing that it completely receded already 37 Ma, long before the Eocene-Oligocene transition. In 2022, Alexis Licht et al. suggested that the Grande Coupure could have possibly been synchronous with the Oi-1 glaciation (33.5 Ma), which records a decline in atmospheric CO_{2}, boosting the Antarctic glaciation that already started by the Eocene-Oligocene transition.

The Grande Coupure event also marked a large faunal turnover marking the arrivals of later anthracotheres, entelodonts, ruminants (Gelocidae, Lophiomerycidae), rhinocerotoids (Rhinocerotidae, Amynodontidae, Eggysodontidae), carnivorans (later Amphicyonidae, Amphicynodontidae, Nimravidae, and Ursidae), eastern Eurasian rodents (Eomyidae, Cricetidae, and Castoridae), and eulipotyphlans (Erinaceidae).

The Eocene-Oligocene transition of western Europe, as a result of the global climatic conditions, is marked by a transition from tropical and subtropical forests to more open, temperate or mixed deciduous habitats with adaptations to increased seasonality. While Anoplotherium did not last long in the earliest Oligocene, there are disagreements as to whether it survived the Grande Coupure or went extinct at the event. While evidence points towards Anoplotherium being extirpated from areas like France and the United Kingdom by the Grande Coupure (last occurrences MP20), the perception is complicated by the apparent last survival of A. commune in the MP21 locality of Möhren 19 in southern Germany (the edge of western Europe) along with Palaeotherium medium and Diplobune quercyi (slightly younger localities indicate their extinctions and replacements by Grande Coupure immigrants such as the anthracothere Anthracotherium and the rhinocerotid Epiaceratherium).

Hooker pointed out that localities like Möhren 19 span earlier times where the surviving endemic faunas are accompanied by some Grande Coupure immigrants but otherwise were not yet joined by certain immigrants such as Anthracotherium. Additionally, the surviving endemics of the locality are missing from other areas dating to MP21. Therefore, he argued that certain older MP21 localities with surviving endemic faunas fill the long gap between the youngest pre-Grande Coupure Lower Hamstead Member and the younger post-Grande Coupure Upper Hamstead Member within the Bouldnor Formation. This interpretation, Hooker explained, means that the localities represented very brief moments of survival of endemic faunas during the Grande Coupure, therefore supporting the idea of a major and rapid faunal extinction and immigration event, including the extinction of Anoplotherium in the event.

The extinctions of a majority of endemic artiodactyls, including Anoplotherium, have been attributed to competition with immigrant faunas, environmental changes from cooling climates, or some combination of the two. Sarah C. Joomun et al. determined that certain faunas may have arrived later and therefore may have not played roles in the extinctions. They concluded that climate change, which led to increased seasonality and changes in plant food availability, led the artiodactyls to become unable to adapt to the major changes and go extinct. Weppe made similar arguments towards climate change being the main cause of the Grande Coupure extinction event, arguing that the cooling climates displaced the previously stable subtropical environments of western Europe and caused a collapse in the artiodactyl community, which after their extinctions left empty ecological niches that were passively filled by immigrant faunas. Weppe and colleagues found that the diversity of endemic artiodactyls was positively impacted by the diversity of immigrant artiodactyls, in addition the diversity of the immigrant artiodactyls negatively correlated with the extinction rate of the endemic artiodactyls. This suggests that immigrant artiodactyls did not play a role in their decline and extinction of endemic artiodactyls, during or after the transition.
