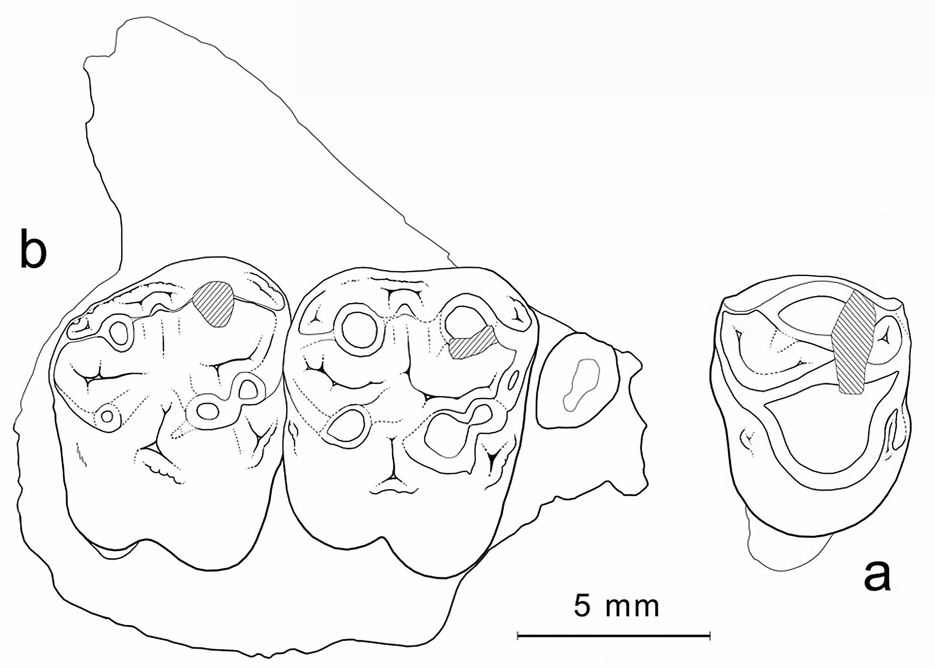
- Teeth
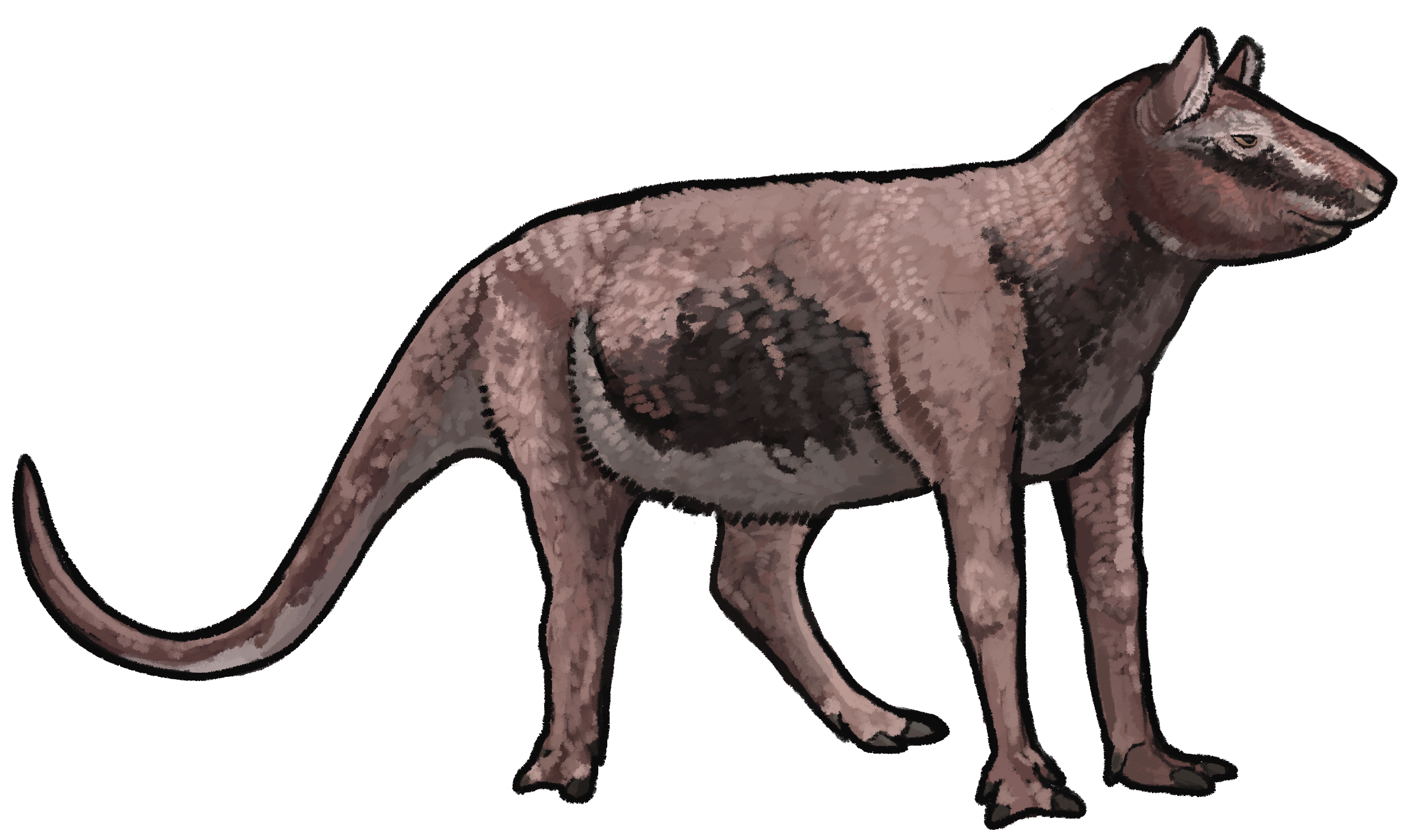
- Life Restoration

Scientific classification
- Kingdom: Animalia
- Phylum: Chordata
- Class: Mammalia
- Order: Artiodactyla
- Family: †Cebochoeridae
- Genus: †Cebochoerus; Gervais, 1852

Species
- C. fontensis Sudre, 1978

= Cebochoerus =

Cebochoerus Temporal range: Eocene

Extinct basal artiodactyl

Cebochoerus is an extinct basal artiodactyl genus belonging to the family Cebochoeridae in the superfamily Dichobunoidea. It occurred in Europe during the Early to Late Eocene.
