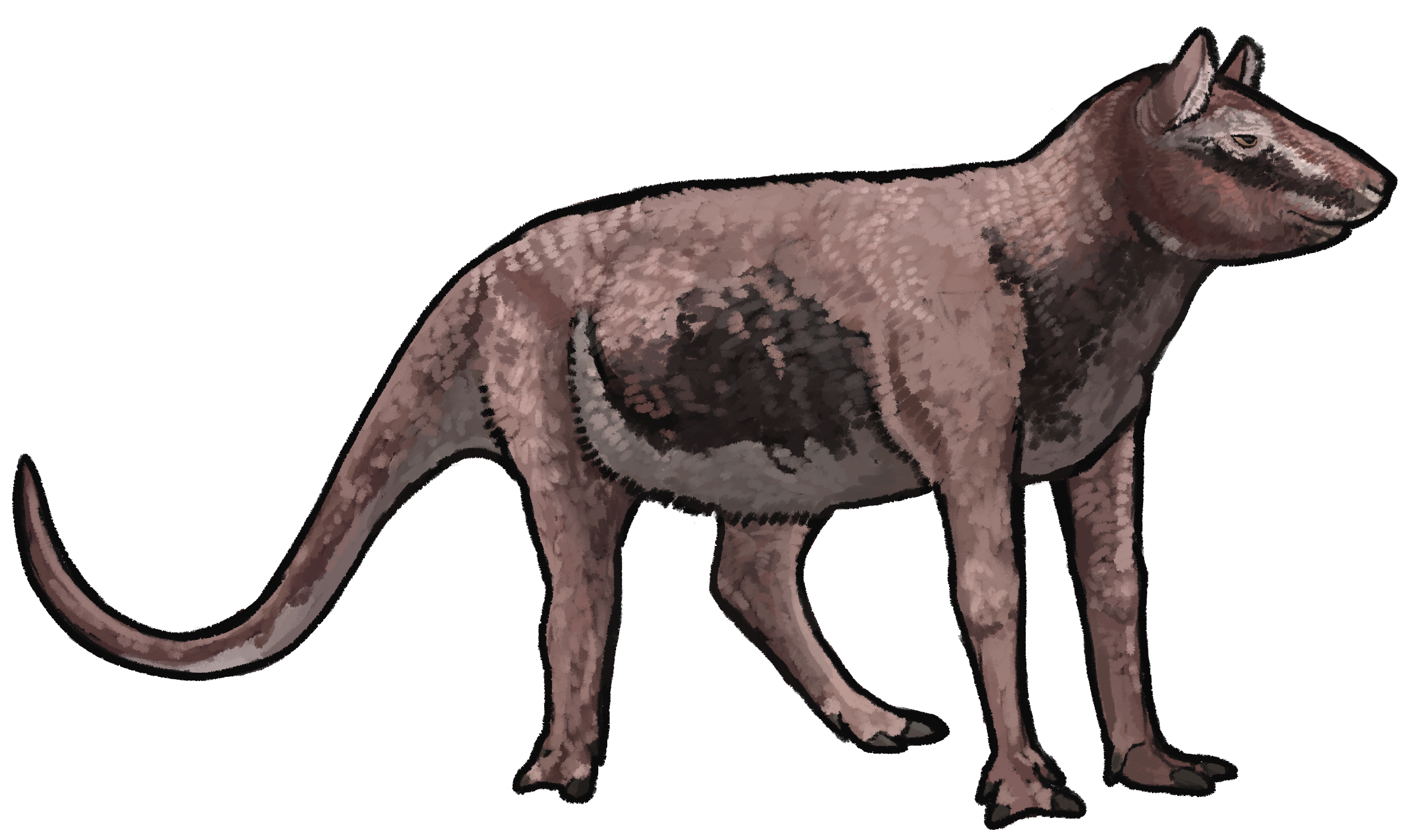
- Life Restoration of Cebochoerus

Scientific classification
- Kingdom: Animalia
- Phylum: Chordata
- Class: Mammalia
- Order: Artiodactyla
- Superfamily: †Dichobunoidea
- Family: †Cebochoeridae; Lydekker, 1883

Genera
- †Acotherulum; †Cebochoerus; †Gervachoerus; †Moiachoerus

= Cebochoeridae =

Cebochoeridae Temporal range: Middle Eocene–Early Oligocene

Extinct basal artiodactyl

Cebochoeridae is an extinct family of small-to-medium-sized bunodont artiodactyl mammals that thrived in Western Europe during the Eocene to early Oligocene. The distinguishing features of this family are short, robust jaws and pig-like teeth. The genera consisting of this family include Acotherulum, Cebochoerus, Gervachoerus, and Moiachoerus. The placement of this family among artiodactyls has been controversial, with some linking the family with Whippomorpha, while others linking them to another extinct clade of Paleogene European artiodactyls Dichobunia.
