= Paraloris =

Paraloris Temporal range: Paleogene–Paleogene

Scientific classification
- Kingdom: Animalia
- Phylum: Chordata
- Class: Mammalia
- Order: Primates
- Suborder: Haplorhini
- Family: †Omomyidae
- Subfamily: †Microchoerinae
- Genus: †Paraloris; Fahlbusch, 1995

Species
- Paraloris bavaricus (Fahlbusch, 1995)

Extinct omomyid primate from the Paleogene

Paraloris is an extinct genus of omomyid primate from Paleogene Europe.

== Description ==
Paraloris is odd compared to other microchoerines, bearing many traits unique to the genus. Paraloris has low crowned molars with smooth enamel, contrasting the wrinkled enamel patterning of Necrolemur. Due to these basal traits, Paraloris is often found at the base of most phylogenies made of Microchoerinae.
