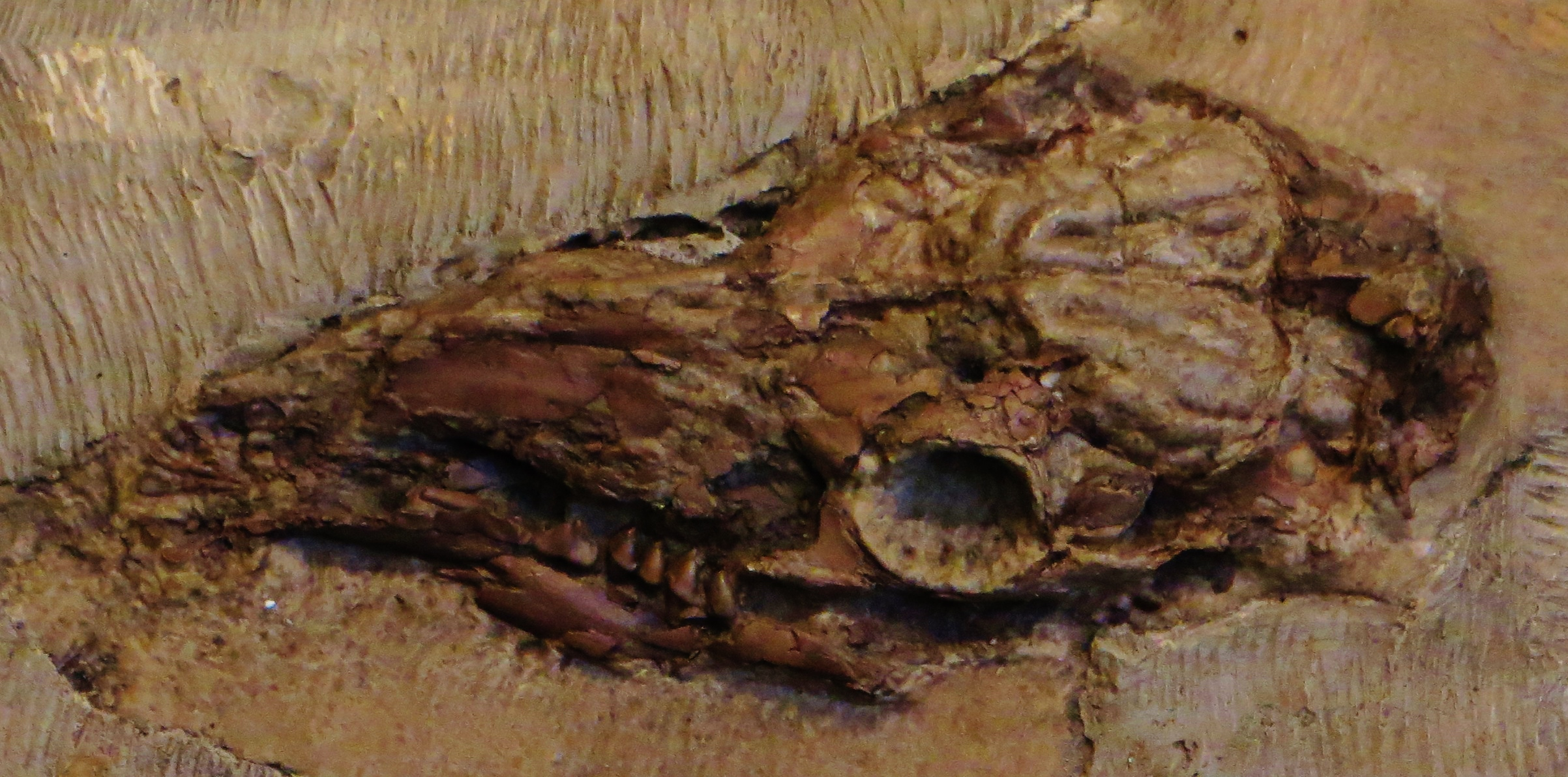
- Xiphodon gracilis skull, National Museum of Natural History, France

Scientific classification
- Kingdom: Animalia
- Phylum: Chordata
- Class: Mammalia
- Order: Artiodactyla
- Family: †Xiphodontidae
- Genus: †Xiphodon; Cuvier, 1822

Type species
- †Anoplotherium gracile (= †Xiphodon gracilis) Cuvier, 1822

Other species
- †X. castrensis Kovalevsky, 1876; †X. intermedium Stehlin, 1910

Synonyms
- Synonyms of X. gracilis: Anoplotherium medium Cuvier, 1804; Anoplotherium gracile Cuvier, 1822; Dubious species: Xiphodon tragulinum Gervais, 1876

= Xiphodon =

Xiphodon Temporal range: Middle—Late Eocene (Bartonian to Priabonian) 40–33.9 Ma

Extinct genus of endemic Palaeogene European artiodactyls

Xiphodon (from Ancient Greek ξίφος (xíphos), meaning "sword", and ὀδούς (odoús), meaning "tooth") is the type genus of the extinct Palaeogene artiodactyl family Xiphodontidae. It, like other xiphodonts, was endemic to Western Europe and lived from the Middle to Late Eocene. Fossils from Montmartre in Paris, France that belonged to X. gracilis were first described by the French naturalist Georges Cuvier in 1804. Although he assigned the species to Anoplotherium, he recognized that it differed from A. commune by its dentition and limb bones, later moving it to its own subgenus in 1822. Xiphodon was promoted to genus rank by other naturalists in later decades. It is today defined by the type species X. gracilis and two other species, X. castrensis and X. intermedium.

Xiphodon had specialized bladelike selenodont dentition, with its brachyodont (low-crowned) incisors, canines, and premolars having sharp edges for cutting through higher vegetation such as leaves and shrubs. It also retained primitive molars compared to its relative Dichodon, indicating different dietary specializations. Xiphodon is also the only xiphodontid to be known from postcranial fossils. Its skull morphology, combined with slender and elongated limbs, suggest similar behaviours to North American Palaeogene camelids such as Poebrotherium, including cursoriality (running adaptations). However, the full extent of its behaviour and evolutionary relationships remain uncertain, and its resemblances to camelids are probably an instance of convergent evolution.

Xiphodon lived in western Europe back when it was an archipelago that was isolated from the rest of Eurasia, meaning that it lived in an environment with various other endemic faunas. The xiphodont made its first appearance in the Middle Eocene shortly before a shift towards drier but still subhumid conditions, which led to increasingly abrasive plants. Species of Xiphodon were relatively small with the second-appearing species X. intermedium having an estimated weight of 4.6 kg (10 lb). X. gracilis was the last and largest species within the genus in an evolutionary size increase trend.

It and other xiphodont genera went extinct by the Grande Coupure extinction/faunal turnover event, coinciding with shifts towards further glaciation and seasonality plus dispersals of Asian immigrant faunas into western Europe. The causes of its extinction are attributed to negative interactions with immigrant faunas (resource competition, predation), environmental turnover from climate change, or some combination of the two.

== Taxonomy ==
=== Research history ===
==== Early history ====
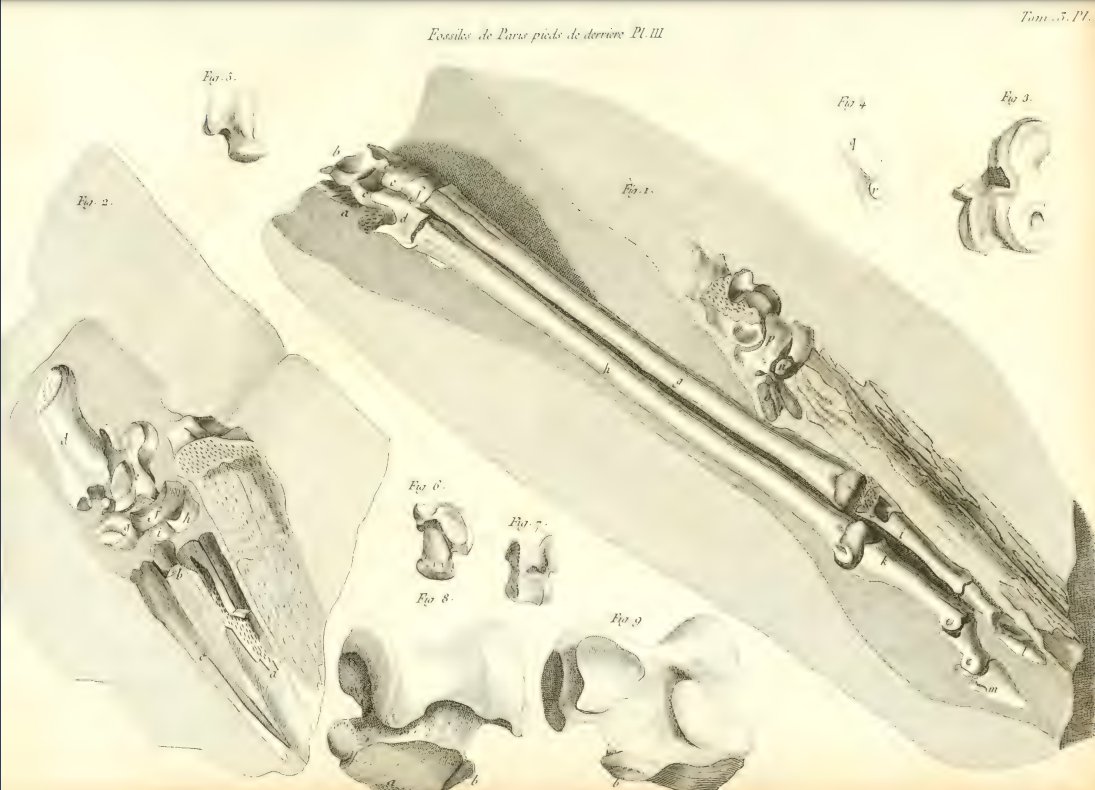
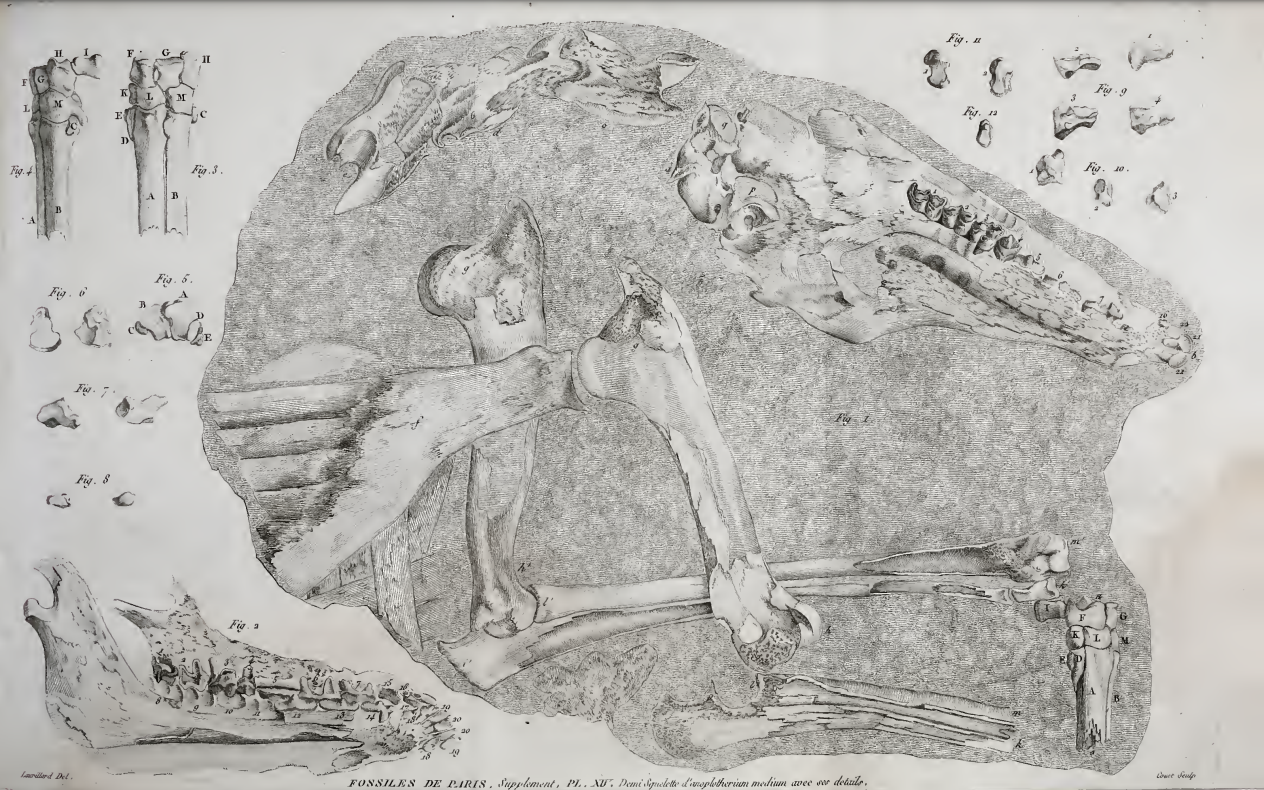
Sketches of limb bones (fig. 1, left, 1804) and various fossil remains (right, 1812) of "Anoplotherium medium" (= Xiphodon gracilis) by Georges Cuvier

In 1804, the French naturalist Georges Cuvier established multiple fossil species as belonging to the genus Anoplotherium other than A. commune. One of the species he named was A. medium, which he said had slender, elongated, and didactyl (two-toed) feet. He thought that Anoplotherium had didactyl hooves instead of tridactyl (three-toed) hooves, which would have separated it from the other "pachyderm" Palaeotherium. Based on the hooves and dentition, he concluded that Anoplotherium was similar to ruminants or camelids. In 1807, Cuvier gave further elaboration to his thoughts on the limb bones, suggesting that it superficially resembles those of llamas. He explained that the third phalanx of A. medium differed from those of llamas by its slightly larger proportions. He put forward his argument that because its third phalanx more closely resembled those of ruminants, it was more closely related to the mammal group than A. commune was to them. Cuvier also said that other postcranial morphologies of the femoral head and tibia more closely resembled those of ruminants than those of camels. He attributed damaged lumbar vertebrae to A. medium in 1808.

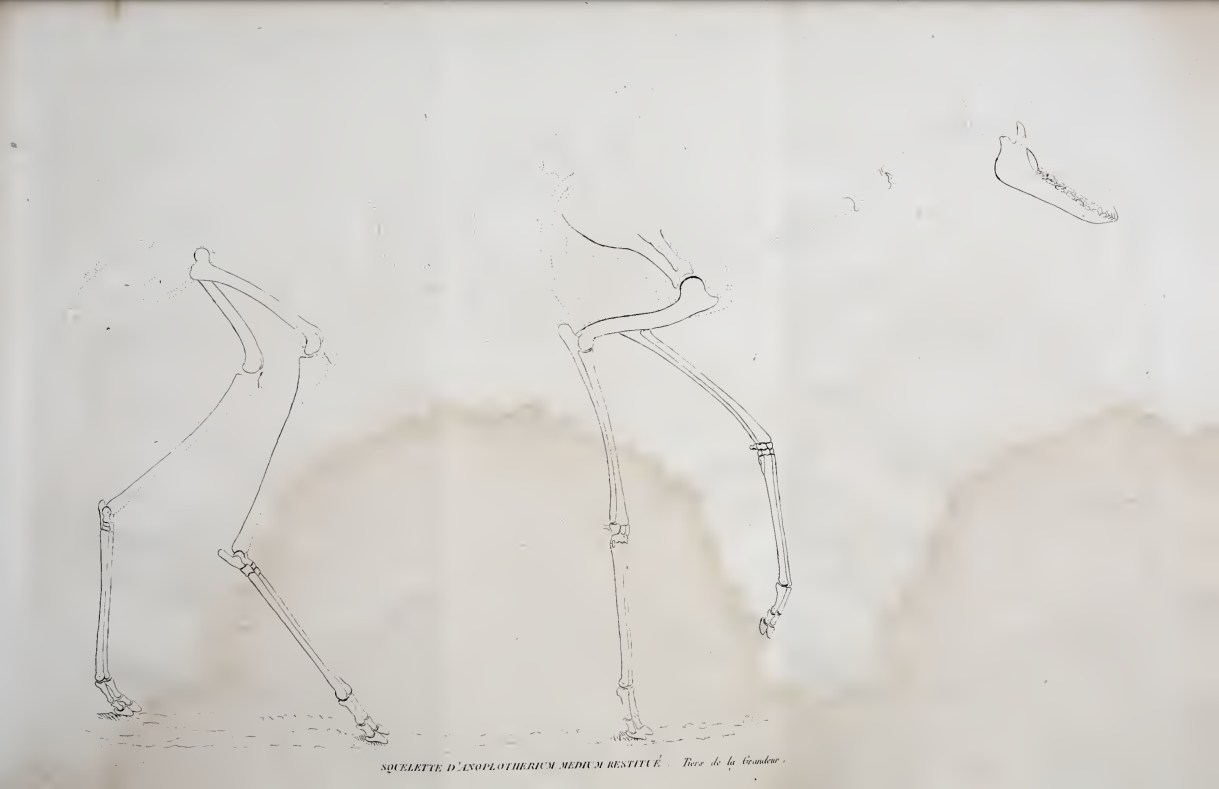
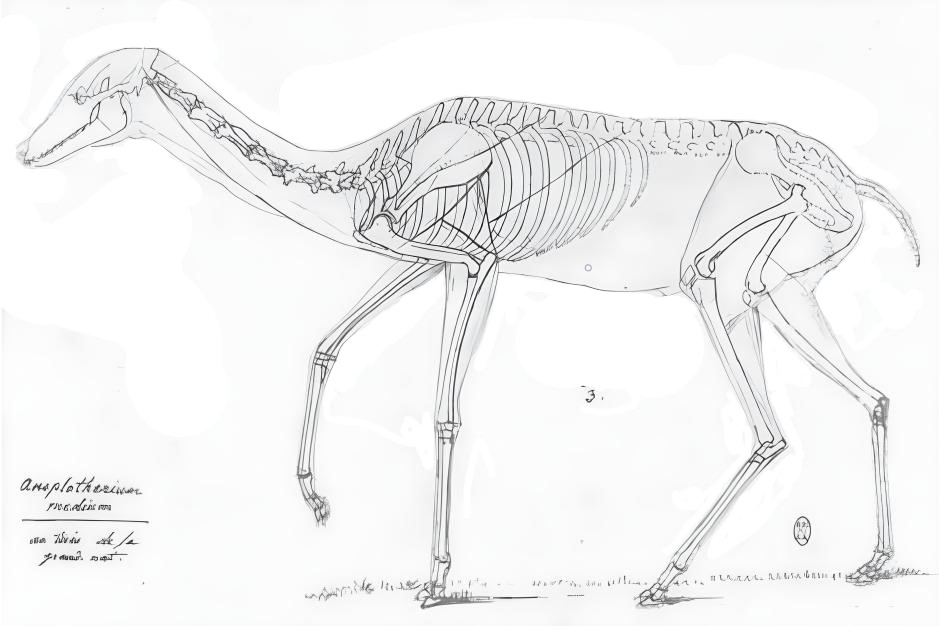
Georges Cuvier's published sketch (left) and unpublished sketch with outline (right) of an incomplete skeletal reconstruction of "A. medium" (= X. gracilis), ~1812

Cuvier published his drawings of skeletal reconstructions of two species of Anoplotherium in 1812 based on known fossil remains including A. medium. He noted that he had no evidence for torso or tail bones of A. medium but that he had fossils of its skull, neck, tibia, and tarsus bone, adding to the hind foot evidence that he described years prior. He stated that in contrast to the more robust A. commune, A. medium was more gracile in form and therefore would have been built for cursoriality similar to extant ungulates such as gazelles or roe deer. He hypothesized, therefore, that unlike A. commune which he thought had semi-aquatic habits, A. medium could not have lived in marshes or ponds. Instead, he said, it would have grazed on herbs and shrubs on dry lands and had more "timid" behaviours not unlike gracile ruminants. Cuvier also proposed that it probably did not have a long tail unlike A. commune and that it had mobile ears like deer for hearing danger in advance. A. medium, according to the naturalist, had short fur and probably did not ruminate.

In 1822, Cuvier established the subgenus Xiphodon for the genus Anoplotherium and changed the species name Anoplotherium medium to Xiphodon gracile because he felt that it was a more fitting species name. He argued that the species has a head roughly the shape plus shape of the "corinne" (an archaic term for the dorcas gazelle) with sharp snouts and differs from A. commune on the basis of long and sharp molars. However, he also suggested that the two species do not differ on the genus level. It alongside other Paris Basin fossil species were depicted in 1822 drawings by the French palaeontologist Charles Léopold Laurillard under the direction of Cuvier, although the restorations were not as detailed as Cuvier's. The genus name Xiphodon means "sword tooth" and is a compound of the Ancient Greek words ξίφος (xiphos, 'sword') and ὀδούς (odoús, 'tooth').

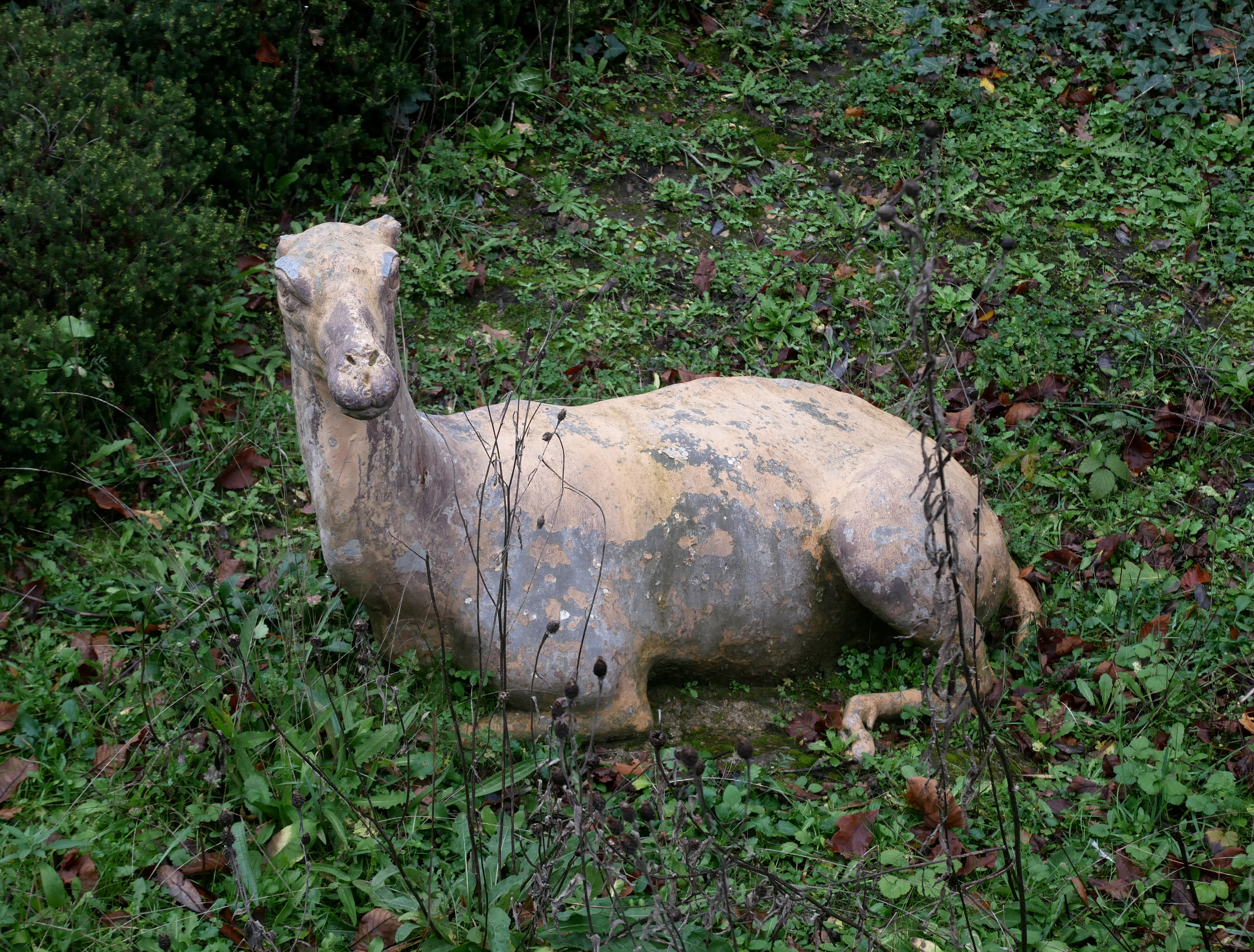
The sole surviving sculpture of "A. gracile" (= X. gracilis), long misidentified as a Megaloceros fawn, of the "Tertiary Island" of the Crystal Palace Dinosaurs assemblage

In an 1848–1852 work, the French naturalist Paul Gervais affirmed that Xiphodon was a distinct genus from Anoplotherium. He similarly conveyed that X. gracile was slender like antelopes but was slightly smaller than dorcas gazelles. He erected the second species X. gelyense from the French commune of Saint-Gély-du-Fesc. He also reclassified Hyopotamus (= Bothriodon) crispus into Xiphodon. The validity of Xiphodon as a genus was also supported by the British naturalist Richard Owen the same year, who also erected Dichodon. Owen emended the species X. gracile and X. gelyense to X. gracilis and X. gelyensis, respectively in 1857.

X. gracilis was amongst the fossil taxa depicted in the Crystal Palace Dinosaurs assemblage in the Crystal Palace Park in the United Kingdom, open to the public since 1854 and constructed by English sculptor Benjamin Waterhouse Hawkins. Benjamin apparently either refused to acknowledge the genus name or was unaware of it, meaning that sculptures of the species were referred to as "A. gracile". The extant sculptures of A. commune were historically confused with "A. gracile", the result of both species having been listed in the earliest Crystal Palace guidebooks. An illustration of Hawkins' workshop reveals that four sculptures representing "A. gracile" were constructed by him, three of which vanished without any traces.

The fourth sculpture was mistaken as a Megaloceros giganteus fawn and was associated with the Megaloceros sculptures for an unknown amount of time. The sole surviving sculpture measures 1.7 m (5 ft 7 in) long from the snout to the tail and has a llama-like appearance given its long neck, small head, large eyes, robust body, camel-like nose, branched lips, and a narrow snout. The sculpture's appearance overall matches up with Cuvier's anatomical description of the species, the main inaccuracy being the reconstruction of additional small digits similar to A. commune. Its design and intended representation as a herd were likely inspired by South American llama appearances and behaviours. The illustration of Hawkins' workshop implies that the Xiphodon gracilis sculptures were intended to represent a relaxed herd.

==== Additional species and synonyms ====
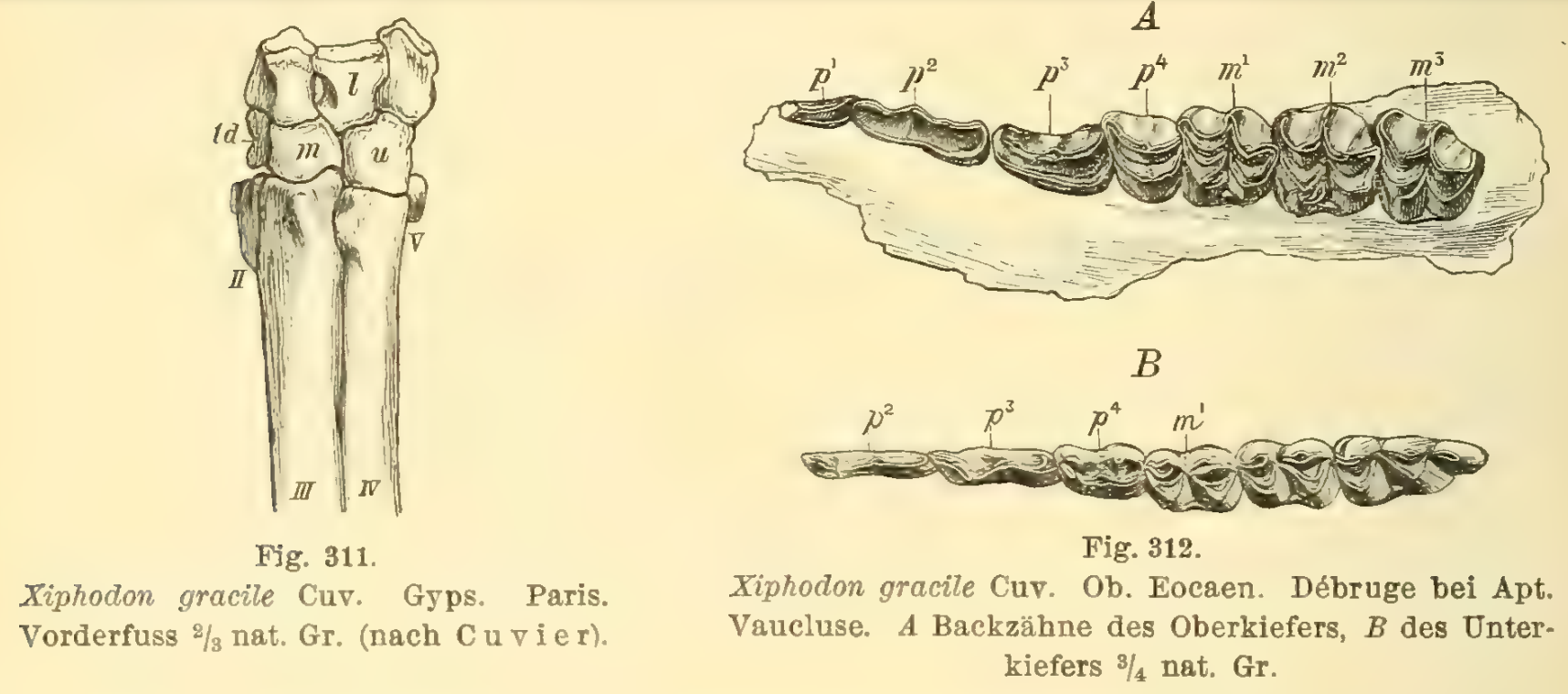
Illustrations of the front foot (left) and dentition (right) of X. gracilis, 1891–1893

In 1873, Vladimir Kovalevsky rejected Gervais' reclassification of Hyopotamus crispus (= Elomeryx crispus) into Xiphodon. In 1876, British naturalist William Henry Flower expressed being unsure whether Dichodon was distinct enough from Xiphodon. As he disliked the concept of having multiple closely related genera, he chose to place in Xiphodon the newly erected species X. platyceps. The same year, Kovalevsky erected a newly determined smaller species that he named X. castrense after the French commune of Castres. He also stated that its sharp premolars justified the genus etymology "sword tooth". Gervais erected another species that he tentatively assigned to Xiphodon the same year as well, naming it X? tragulinum. In 1884, the French naturalist Henri Filhol erected the species X. magnum based on a lower jaw fossil, arguing that the species was larger than X. gracilis.

The British naturalist Richard Lydekker reviewed the known species of Dichodon and Xiphodon in 1885, confirming that both are distinct genera. He also reaffirmed the validities of both X. gracilis and X. gelyensis then synonymized Xiphodontherium, erected previously by Filhol in 1877, with Xiphodon, thus reclassifying Xiphodontherium secundarius into Xiphodon. He also suggested that Xiphodon platyceps may be synonymous with Dacrytherium ovinum. He did not reference X. castrense in his catalogue. In 1886, the German palaeontologist Max Schlosser transferred "X. gelyense" into the newer genus Phaneromeryx.

In 1910, the Swiss palaeontologist Hans Georg Stehlin synonymized Xiphodontherium with Amphimeryx, also making X. primaevum and X. secundarium synonymous with A. murinus in the process. He stated that X. platyceps was most likely synonymous with Dichodon cuspidatum, considered X? tragulinum to be a dubious name, and expressed doubt that X. magnum if valid truly belongs to Xiphodon. He also created the species X. intermedium based on dental measurements intermediate between the smaller X. castrense and the larger X. gracile.

In 2000, Jerry J. Hooker and Marc Weidmann listed X. castrensis as an emended name for X. castrense. According to Jörg Erfurt and Grégoire Métais in 2007, X. castrensis and X. intermedium lack definite differential diagnoses other than dental sizes.

=== Classification ===
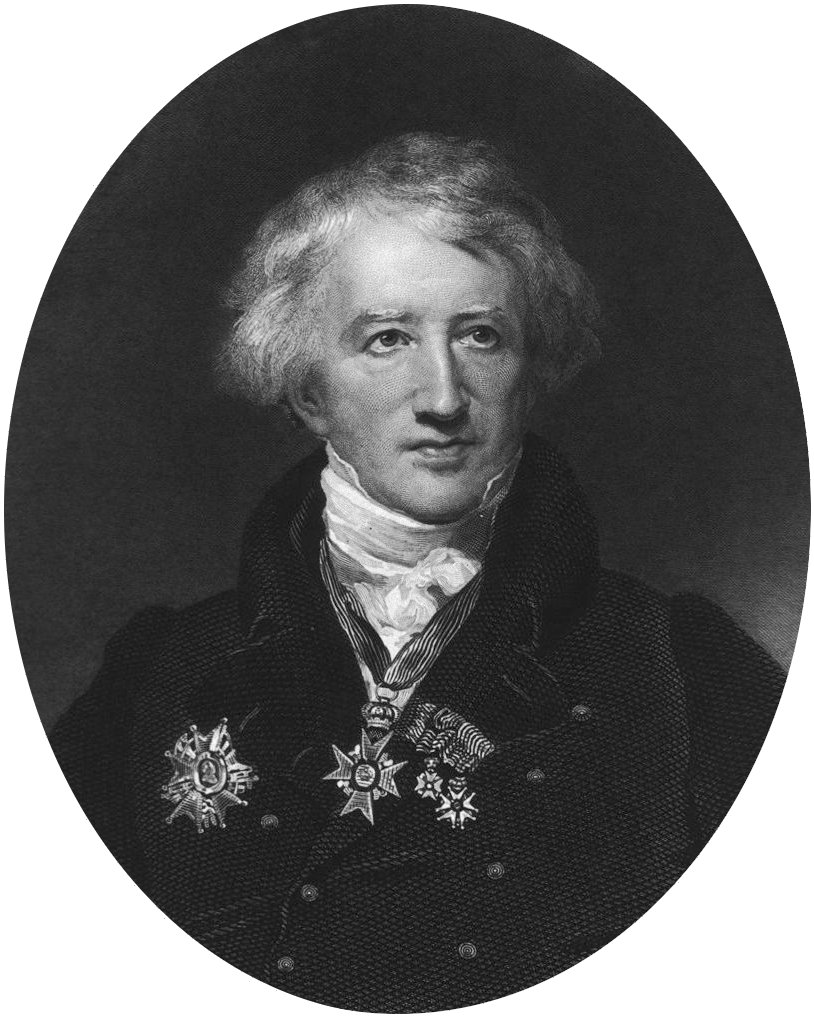
Portrait of Georges Cuvier, who erected Xiphodon in 1822

Xiphodon is the type genus of the Xiphodontidae, a Palaeogene artiodactyl family endemic to western Europe that lived from the Middle Eocene to the Early Oligocene (~44 Ma to 33 Ma). Like the other contemporary endemic artiodactyl families of western Europe, the evolutionary origins of the Xiphodontidae are poorly known. While Xiphodon had been thought to have appeared as early as MP10 of the Mammal Palaeogene zones based on one locality, this allocation is based on very poor fossil material. Instead, the Xiphodontidae is generally thought to have first appeared by MP14, making them the first selenodont dentition artiodactyl representatives to have appeared in the landmass along with the Amphimerycidae. More specifically, the first xiphodont representatives to appear were the genera Dichodon and Haplomeryx. Dichodon and Haplomeryx continued to persist into the Late Eocene while Xiphodon made its first appearance by MP16. Another xiphodont Paraxiphodon is known to have occurred only in MP17a localities. The former three genera lived up to the Early Oligocene where they have been recorded to have all gone extinct as a result of the Grande Coupure faunal turnover event.

The phylogenetic relations of the Xiphodontidae as well as the Anoplotheriidae, Mixtotheriidae and Cainotheriidae have been elusive due to the selenodont morphologies (or having crescent-shaped ridges) of the molars, which were convergent with tylopods or ruminants. Some researchers considered the selenodont families Anoplotheriidae, Xiphodontidae, and Cainotheriidae to be within Tylopoda due to postcranial features that were similar to the tylopods from North America in the Palaeogene. Other researchers tie them as being more closely related to ruminants than tylopods based on dental morphology. Different phylogenetic analyses have produced different results for the "derived" (or of new evolutionary traits) selenodont Eocene European artiodactyl families, making it uncertain whether they were closer to the Tylopoda or Ruminantia. Possibly, the Xiphodontidae may have arisen from an unknown dichobunoid group, thus making its resemblance to tylopods an instance of convergent evolution.

In an article published in 2019, Romain Weppe et al. conducted a phylogenetic analysis on the Cainotherioidea within the Artiodactyla based on mandibular and dental characteristics, specifically in terms of relationships with artiodactyls of the Palaeogene. The results retrieved that the superfamily was closely related to the Mixtotheriidae and Anoplotheriidae. They determined that the Cainotheriidae, Robiacinidae, Anoplotheriidae, and Mixtotheriidae formed a clade that was the sister group to the Ruminantia while Tylopoda, along with the Amphimerycidae and Xiphodontidae split earlier in the tree. The phylogenetic tree published in the article and another work about the cainotherioids is outlined below:

- - Eurodexis russelli
  - Dichobune leporina
  - - - Amphimeryx murinus
      - - Xiphodon castrense
        - Tylopoda
          - Paratoceras coatesi
          - Eotylopus reedi
    - - Ruminantia
        - Parvitragulus priscus
        - - Lophiomeryx chalaniati
          - Archaeomeryx optatus
      - - Mixtotheriidae
          Mixtotherium cuspidatum
        - Anoplotheriidae
          - Anoplotherium latipes
          - Dacrytherium ovinum
        - Cainotherioidea
          - Robiacinidae
            - Robiacina lavergnesis
            - - Robiacina minuta
              - Robiacina quercyi
          - Cainotheriidae
            - Palembertina deplasi
            - - Oxacroninae
                - Paroxacron bergeri
                - - Paroxacron valdense
                  - Oxacron courtoisii
              - Cainotheriinae
                - Cainotherium laticurvatum
                - - Caenomeryx
                    - Caenomeryx filholi
                    - Caenomeryx procommunis
                  - Plesiomeryx
                    - Plesiomeryx cadurcensis
                    - Plesiomeryx huerzeleri

In 2020, Vincent Luccisano et al. created a phylogenetic tree of the basal artiodactyls, a majority endemic to western Europe, from the Palaeogene. In one clade, the "bunoselenodont endemic European" Mixtotheriidae, Anoplotheriidae, Xiphodontidae, Amphimerycidae, Cainotheriidae, and Robiacinidae are grouped together with the Ruminantia. The phylogenetic tree as produced by the authors is shown below:

- Artiodactyla
  - Bunophorus
  - - Gunophorus
    - Diacodexis
  - - - Protodichobune
      - Eurodexis
    - - - Buxobune
        - - Mouillacitherium
          - Meniscodon
        - - - Hyperdichobune
            - - Dichobune robertiana
              - - Dichobune leporina
                - - Homacodon
                  - - Gobiohyus
                    - Suina
                      - - Khirtharia
                        - Entelodon
                      - - Palaeocheorus
                        - Perchoerus
          - - Haplobunodontidae
              - Haplobunodon
              - - Cuisitherium
                - Lophiobunodon
            - - Mixtotherium
              - - Robiacina
                - - - - Dacrytherium
                      - Diplobune
                    - - Xiphodon
                      - Paraxiphodon
                  - - - Cainotherium
                      - Paroxacron
                    - - Archaeomeryx
                      - - Amphimeryx
                        - Pseudamphimeryx
      - - Aumelasia
        - - - Hallebune
            - Amphirhagatherium
          - - Cebochoeridae
              - Cebochoerus
              - Gervachoerus
            - - Choeropotamus
              - Siamotherium

In 2022, Weppe created a phylogenetic analysis in his academic thesis regarding Palaeogene artiodactyl lineages, focusing most specifically on the endemic European families. He stated that his phylogeny was the first formal one to propose affinities of the Xiphodontidae and Anoplotheriidae. He found that the Anoplotheriidae, Mixtotheriidae, and Cainotherioidea form a clade based on synapomorphic dental traits (traits thought to have originated from their most recent common ancestor). The result, Weppe mentioned, matches up with previous phylogenetic analyses on the Cainotherioidea with other endemic European Palaeogene artiodactyls that support the families as a clade. As a result, he argued that the proposed superfamily Anoplotherioidea, composing of the Anoplotheriidae and Xiphodontidae as proposed by Alan W. Gentry and Hooker in 1988, is invalid due to the polyphyly of the lineages in the phylogenetic analysis. However, the Xiphodontidae was still found to compose part of a wider clade with the three other groups. Within the Xiphodontidae, Weppe's phylogeny tree classified Haplomeryx as a sister taxon to the clade consisting of Xiphodon plus Dichodon.

== Description ==
=== Skull ===
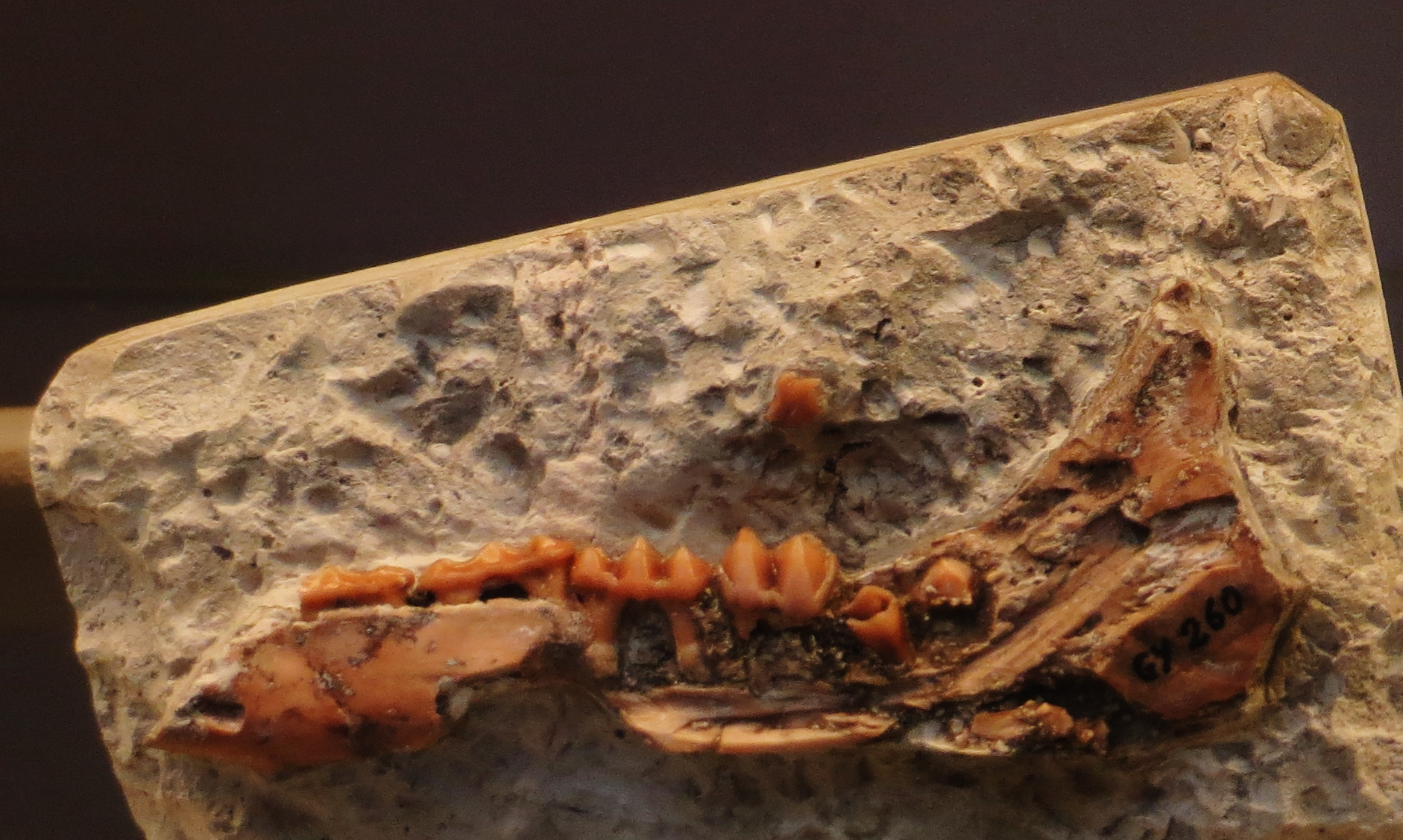
X. gracilis mandible, National Museum of Natural History, France

Xiphodon is diagnosed as having an elongated skull that is convex in the upwards area leading up to the orbit. The orbits themselves are wide open in their back areas. The muzzle (or snout) is elongated and has a rounded appearance. In the xiphodont genus also are large tympanic parts of the temporal bone and visible periotic bones. The palatine foramen are extensive in size from the I^{3} to P^{1} teeth. The mandible appears to be low horizontally, giving off a rectilinear outline.

The maxilla constitutes the majority of the side areas of the skull while the premaxilla extends to the alveolar processes. The nasal bones are narrow and elongated, its passages barely extending over the openings of the external nostrils and forming with it a narrow bony strip. In the back view, the snout appears to have a U-shaped outline. The snout of Xiphodon is similar to that of Dichodon but differs from it by its elongation plus rounded appearance and the maxillae constituting part of the snout being less extensive in height. The snout of Dichodon in comparison is shorter and narrower.

The hard palate for the upper mouth appears concave and has a visible premaxillary-maxillary suture extending from the outer edge of the jaw to the back. Both palatine foramen types of Xiphodon have similar proportions and positions to the palatine foramen of Dichodon, but those of Xiphodon are greater in length and have different morphologies to those of Dichodon.

In addition to the large and hollow tympanic bullae, the ear canal has elevated edges and opens in a slanted position slightly in front of the suture of the occipital bone. The squamosal bone forms a major component of the cranial vault of Xiphodon. A ridge above the external area of the ear canal extends up to the upper convex edge of the zygomatic arch. The upper ear canal's morphology in Xiphodon is similar to that of the Palaeogene camelid Poebrotherium. The back area of the zygomatic arches are narrow and close to the cranial vault. The mandibular fossa appears flat and horizontal, with a small postglenoid process (or projection) taking the shape of a spoon.

=== Endocast anatomy ===
A partial endocast of X. gracilis from the National Museum of Natural History, France was first observed by Colette Dechaseaux in 1963, which had a visible neocortex. The suprasylvian sulcus (or suprasylvia) has a high position within the neocortex but may have had an even higher position within the brain. The lateral sulcus is long and distinct, and a gyrus in front of it appears to have been elevated. The entolateral sulcus does not appear extensive in length. The gyrus between the lateral sulcus and the entolateral sulcus is narrow compared to that between the lateral sulcus and the suprasylvia. All three sulci are distinctly deep in elevation within the neocortex, giving it a hill-like appearance. The neocortex has a similar appearance to those of Palaeogene tylopods like Poebrotherium.

Dechaseaux later uncovered a large spherical flocculus of the cerebrum from the same endocast in 1967. The flocculus is separated from the cerebellar hemisphere and occupies space within the petrous part of the temporal bone within the periotic bone of the ear. It also gives off an enclosed appearance within its outer edges.

=== Dentition ===
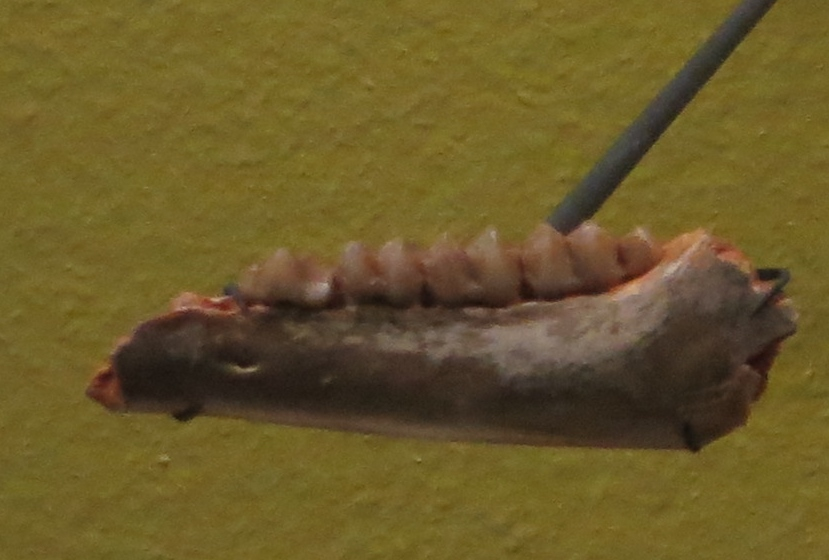
X. gracilis mandible, Natural History Museum of Basel

Both Xiphodon and Dichodon display complete sets of 3 three incisors, 1 canine, 4 premolars, and 3 molars on each half of the upper and lower jaws, consistent with the primitive placental mammal dental formula of 3.1.4.33.1.4.3 for a total of 44 teeth. As members of the Xiphodontidae, they share both small incisors and the absences of distinct diastemata. They are also characterized by indistinct canines in comparison to other teeth and elongated premolars. Xiphodontids additionally have molariform P^{4} teeth, upper molars with 4 to 5 crescent-shaped cusps, and selenodont lower molars with 4 ridges, compressed lingual cuspids, and crescent-shaped labial cuspids.

The dentition of Xiphodon is brachyodont in form. Its premolars are both elongated and unspecialized while its upper molars are quadrangular in shape, display W-shaped ectolophs, and show size increases from M^{1} to M^{3}. They display five cusps, four of which are crescent-shaped. The paraconule and metaconule cusps connect to the parastyle and metastyle cusps, respectively. The protocone cusp is more isolated from other cuspids and has a short preprotocrista ridge.

The third incisors resemble canines but project slightly forward and are separated from the canines by tiny diastemata. The first two other incisors are not known, but based on their round alveolars, they would be projected slightly forward just like the third incisors. The canine of Xiphodon is premolariform with its sharpness similar to the premolars but differ from them by the smaller mesiodistal diameter and asymmetry. All three front premolars appear compressed on the labiolingual side of the teeth, with the second premolar being the most elongated of the three. They appear sharp the closer they are to the canine, with the first premolar appearing to be the sharpest as a result. The similarities of the third incisors, canines, and premolars of Xiphodon reveal that the artiodactyl had specialized bladelike dentition.

Jean Sudre in 1978 argued that Xiphodon displayed the evolutionary trend of the molars becoming more quadrangular in shape and that their selenodont forms were already present in the most basal species X. castrensis.

=== Postcranial skeleton ===
Xiphodon is the only member of its family for which postcranial evidence is known, primarily represented by the gypsum quarries of Montmartre in the case of X. gracilis as previously described by Cuvier. The cervical vertebrae, represented by the axis and two proceeding vertebrae, reach nearly 70% of the total length of the skull, indicating a long neck.

The forelimbs of the xiphodont are thin and elongated. The radius and ulna are more elongated than the humerus. The feet of Xiphodon have two prominent digits: digit III and digit IV. The side digits II and V are heavily reduced. As a result, Xiphodon is a didactyl, or two-toed, genus. Its side metapodials are reduced while the cuboid bone and navicular bone are not fused with each other. The long legs may have supported a high-hanging body. The postcranial characteristics of Xiphodon are thought to be similar to those of Palaeogene camelids like Poebrotherium, although whether Xiphodon is more primitive or more derived in relation to the North American tylopods is unclear. The astragalus originally assigned to Xiphodon is narrow plus elongated in form, its tibial groove appearing narrow but deep. The back calcaneal facet, occupying a significant portion of the astragalus' back face, is wide compared to those of Dacrytherium. The calcaneum appears similar to that of Dacrytherium but differs by a more elongated back tuberosity. However, the postcranial fossils were later reassigned to Leptotheridium while the astragalus originally assigned to Dichodon was reclassified to Xiphodon. The astragalus reassigned to Xiphodon had been described as being narrow and elongated and having a deep tibial groove.

=== Size ===
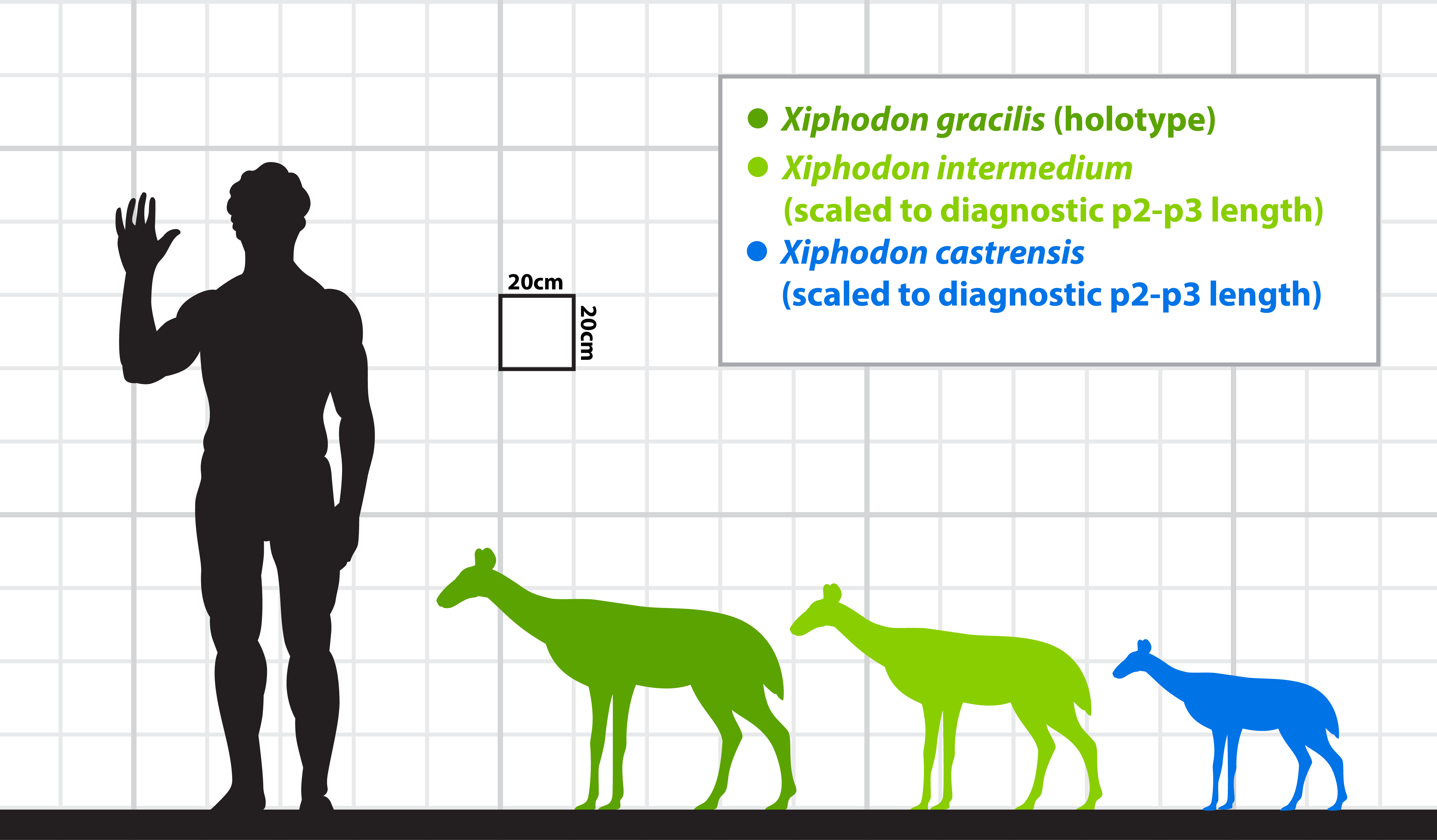
Estimated size comparison of all Xiphodon species based on known fossil remains

The Xiphodontidae is characterized by its species being very small to medium in size. Speciose xiphodonts such as Dichodon and Haplomeryx tended to display evolutionary increases in size. Species belonging to Xiphodon are diagnosed as being medium-sized artiodactyls. The basal species X. castrensis is the smallest of the genus followed by X. intermedium with slightly larger dental measurements. The latest species X. gracilis was the largest of the three. Sudre pointed out that the size trends point towards evolutionary increases in size.

The estimated body mass of X. intermedium has been calculated by Helder Gomes Rodrigues et al. in 2019 based on an astragalus from the University of Lyon that measured 17 mm (0.67 in) long and 8 mm (0.31 in) wide, yielding 4.6 kg (10 lb). The body mass formula based on astragali was previously established by Jean-Noël Martinez and Sudre in 1995 for Palaeogene artiodactyls, although Xiphodon was not included in the initial study.

== Palaeobiology ==
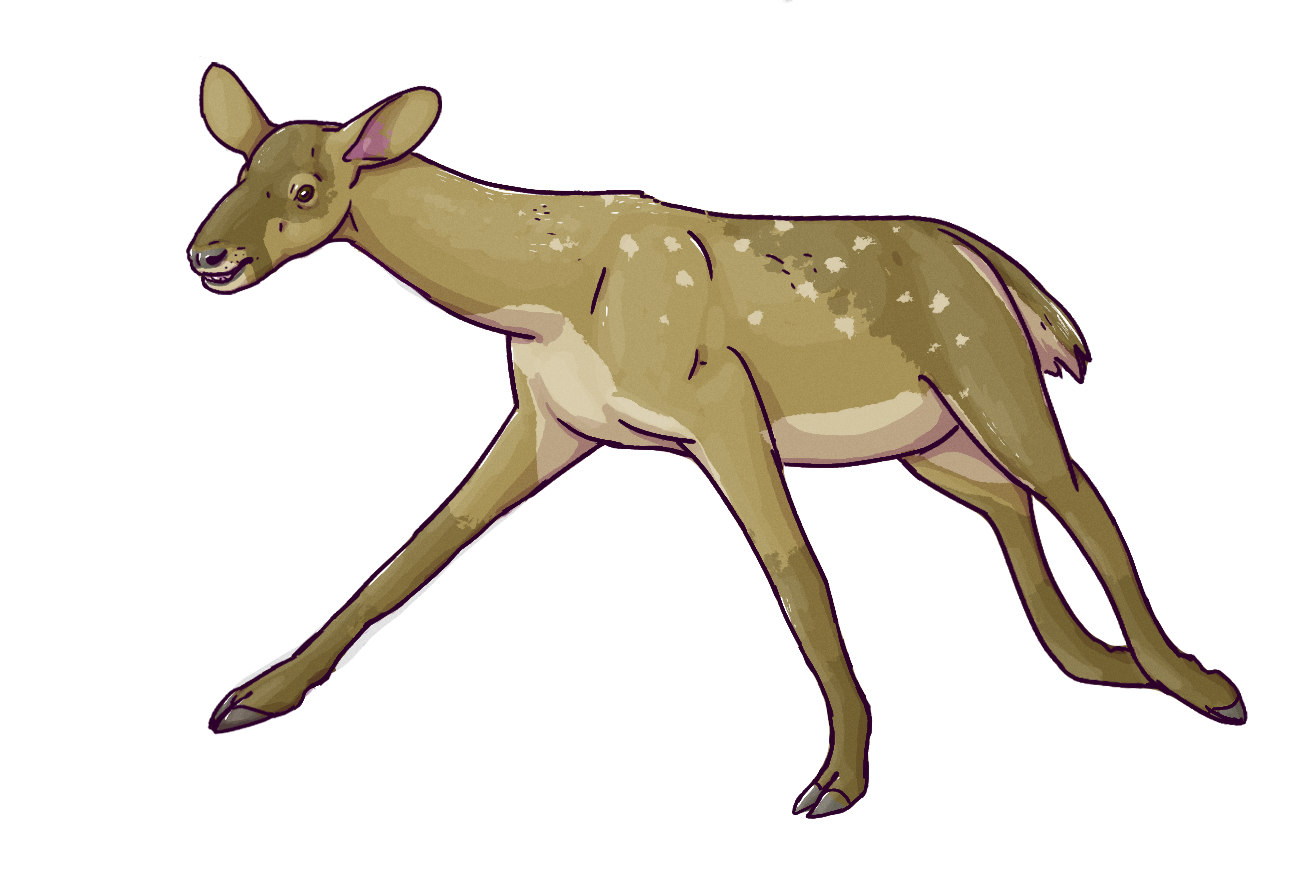
Reconstruction of X. gracilis based on known fossil remains

The Xiphodontidae is a selenodont artiodactyl group in western Europe, meaning that the family was likely adapted for folivorous (leaf-eating) dietary habits. This was especially the case with Xiphodon, which displayed specialized dentition made for feeding on leaves, tree shoots, and shrubs. Xiphodon retained the primitive trait of having molars with five cusps and shifted towards cutting dentition, while Dichodon had progressively molarized premolars for the function of grinding food, meaning that the two genera had different types of ecological specializations. Dechaseaux considered that the two xiphodontid genera may have been more derived than North American Palaeogene tylopods.

The forelimbs of Xiphodon appear to be similar to those of Palaeogene camelids, which had adaptations towards cursoriality. Because of the dental and postcranial similarities, Xiphodon could have been a European ecological counterpart. However, whether Xiphodon had pacing locomotion like camelids cannot be proven. Due to the lack of postcranial evidence of other xiphodonts, it is not possible to prove that their postcranial morphologies are similar to those of Xiphodon.

== Palaeoecology ==
=== Middle Eocene ===
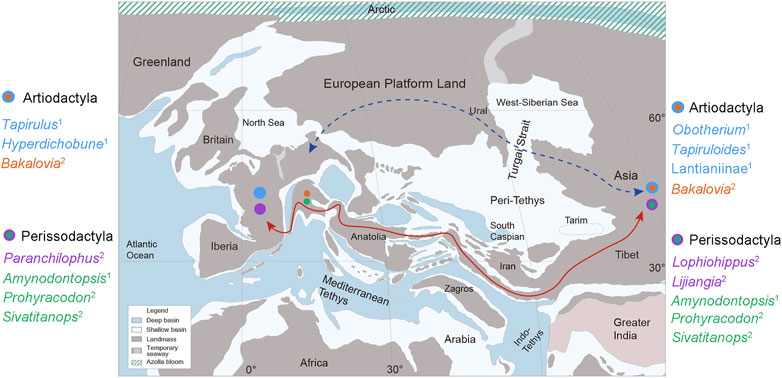
Palaeogeography of Europe and Asia during the Middle Eocene with possible artiodactyl and perissodactyl dispersal routes

For much of the Eocene, a hothouse climate with humid, tropical environments with consistently high precipitations prevailed. Modern mammalian orders including the Perissodactyla, Artiodactyla, and Primates (or the suborder Euprimates) appeared already by the Early Eocene, diversifying rapidly and developing dentitions specialized for folivory. The omnivorous forms mostly either switched to folivorous diets or went extinct by the Middle Eocene (47–37 million years ago) along with the archaic "condylarths". By the Late Eocene (approx. 37–33 mya), most of the ungulate form dentitions shifted from bunodont (or rounded) cusps to cutting ridges (i.e. lophs) for folivorous diets.

Land connections between western Europe and North America were interrupted around 53 Ma. From the Early Eocene up until the Grande Coupure extinction event (56–33.9 mya), western Eurasia was separated into three landmasses: western Europe (an archipelago), Balkanatolia (in-between the Paratethys Sea of the north and the Neotethys Ocean of the south), and eastern Eurasia. The Holarctic mammalian faunas of western Europe were therefore mostly isolated from other landmasses including Greenland, Africa, and eastern Eurasia, allowing for endemism to develop. Therefore, the European mammals of the Late Eocene (MP17–MP20 of the Mammal Palaeogene zones) were mostly descendants of endemic Middle Eocene groups.

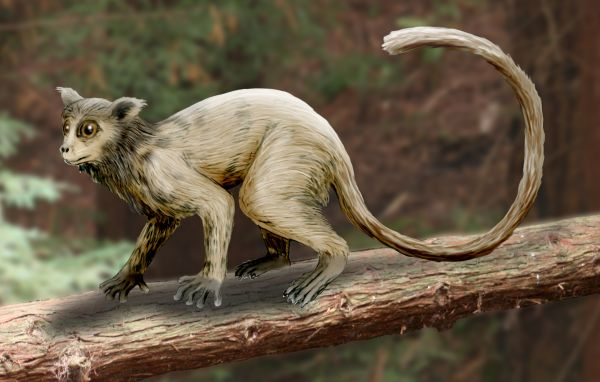
Restoration of Necrolemur, which was endemic to western Europe during the Eocene

Xiphodon made its earliest known appearance in MP16 based on the locality of Robiac in France as X. castrensis. The species is restricted to MP16 localities. By then, it would have coexisted with perissodactyls (Palaeotheriidae, Lophiodontidae, and Hyrachyidae), non-endemic artiodactyls (Dichobunidae and Tapirulidae), endemic European artiodactyls (Choeropotamidae (possibly polyphyletic, however), Cebochoeridae, Mixtotheriidae, Anoplotheriidae, Amphimerycidae, and other members of Xiphodontidae), and primates (Adapidae, Omomyidae). It also cooccurred with metatherians (Herpetotheriidae), rodents (Ischyromyidae, Theridomyoidea, Gliridae), eulipotyphlans, bats, apatotherians, carnivoraformes (Miacidae), and hyaenodonts (Hyainailourinae, Proviverrinae).

Within Robiac, fossils of X. castrensis were found with those of other mammals like the herpetotheriids Peratherium and Amphiperatherium, apatemyid Heterohyus, nyctithere Saturninia, rodents (Glamys, Elfomys, Plesiarctomys, Remys), omomyids Pseudoloris and Necrolemur, adapid Adapis, hyaenodonts Paroxyaena and Cynohyaenodon, carnivoraformes Paramiacis and Simamphicyon, palaeotheres (Palaeotherium, Plagiolophus, Anchilophus, Leptolophus), lophiodont Lophiodon, hyrachyid Chasmotherium, cebochoerids Acotherulum and Cebochoerus, choeropotamid Choeropotamus, tapirulid Tapirulus, anoplotheriids Dacrytherium and Catodontherium, dichobunid Mouillacitherium, robiacinid Robiacina, amphimerycid Pseudamphimeryx, and the other xiphodonts Dichodon and Haplomeryx.

By MP16, a faunal turnover occurred, marking the disappearances of the lophiodonts and European hyrachyids as well as the extinctions of all European crocodylomorphs except for the alligatoroid Diplocynodon. The causes of the faunal turnover have been attributed to a shift from humid and highly tropical environments to drier and more temperate forests with open areas and more abrasive vegetation. The surviving herbivorous faunas shifted their dentitions and dietary strategies accordingly to adapt to abrasive and seasonal vegetation. The environments were still subhumid and full of subtropical evergreen forests, however. The Palaeotheriidae was the sole remaining European perissodactyl group, and frugivorous-folivorous or purely folivorous artiodactyls became the dominant group in western Europe.

=== Late Eocene ===
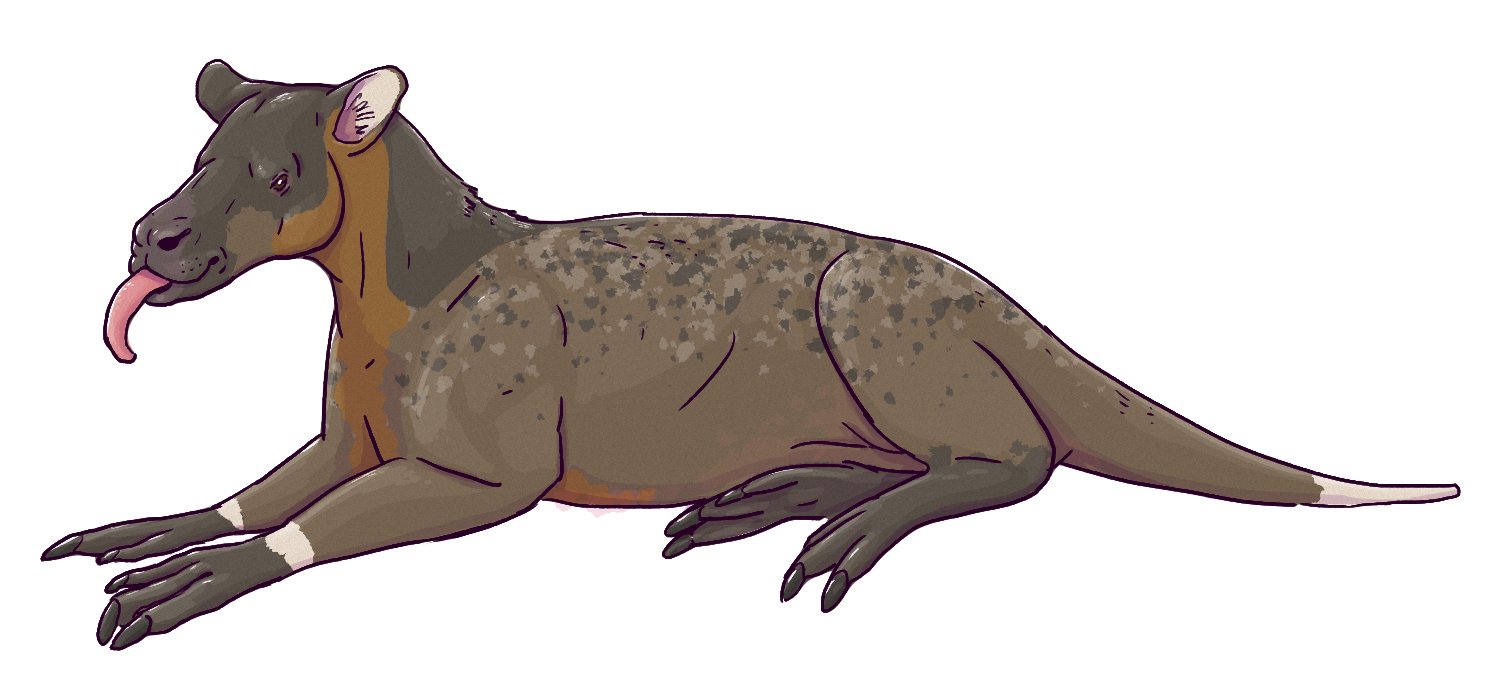
Restoration of Diplobune secundaria, an anoplotheriid that coexisted with Xiphodon in the Late Eocene

The next species of Xiphodon to appear in the fossil record was X. intermedium of MP17a, where it is exclusive to. After a brief fossil record gap in MP17b, the latest species to have appeared was X. gracilis by MP18. The xiphodont largely coexisted with the same artiodactyl families as well as the Palaeotheriidae within western Europe, although the Cainotheriidae and the derived anoplotheriids Anoplotherium and Diplobune all made their first fossil record appearances by MP18. In addition, several migrant mammal groups had reached western Europe by MP17a-MP18, namely the Anthracotheriidae, Hyaenodontinae, and Amphicyonidae. In addition to snakes, frogs, and salamandrids, rich assemblage of lizards are known in western Europe as well from MP16-MP20, representing the Iguanidae, Lacertidae, Gekkonidae, Agamidae, Scincidae, Helodermatidae, and Varanoidea, most of which were able to thrive in the warm temperatures of western Europe.

X. gracilis is well-represented in localities of France, Spain, and the United Kingdom. It has the longest known fossil record range within its genus, lasting from MP18 to MP20. Based on the MP19 French locality of Escamps, it coexisted with the likes of the herpetotheriids Peratherium and Amphiperatherium, pseudorhyncocyonid Pseudorhyncocyon, nyctitheres Saturninia and Amphidozotherium, various bats and rodents, omomyid Microchoerus, adapid Palaeolemur, hyainailourine Pterodon, amphicyonid Cynodictis, palaeotheres Palaeotherium and Plagiolophus, dichobunid Dichobune, choeropotamid Choeropotamus, anoplotheriids Anoplotherium and Diplobune, cainothere Oxacron, amphimerycid Amphimeryx, and the other xiphodonts Dichodon and Haplomeryx.

== Extinction ==
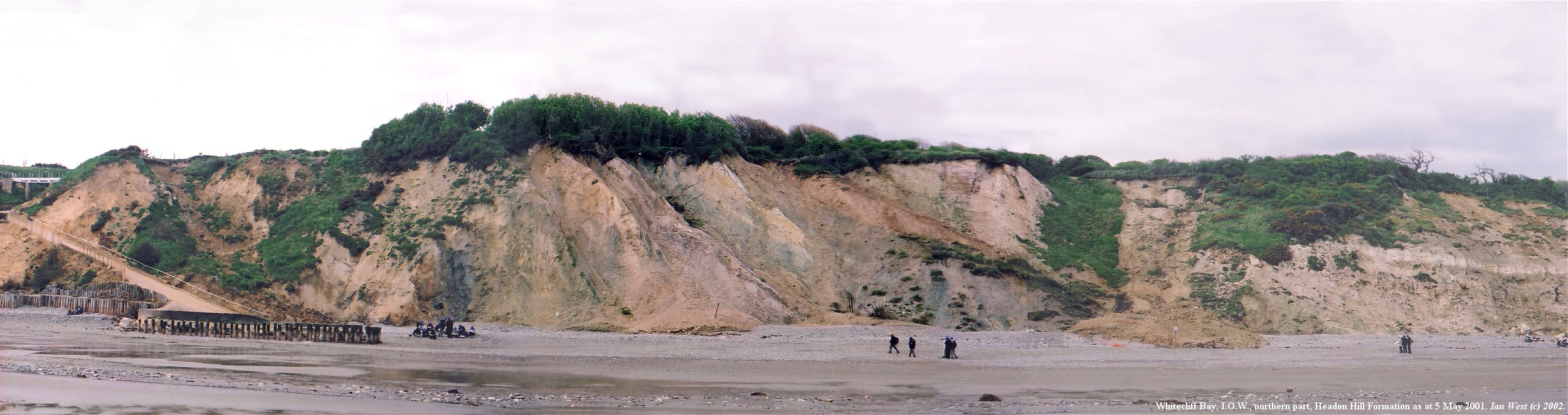
A panorama of the Headon Hill Formation in the Isle of Wight. The stratigraphy of it and the Bouldnor Formation led to better understandings of faunal chronologies from the Late Eocene up to the Grande Coupure.

The Grande Coupure event during the latest Eocene to earliest Oligocene (MP20-MP21) is one of the largest and most abrupt faunal turnovers in the Cenozoic of Western Europe and coincident with climate forcing events of cooler and more seasonal climates. The event led to the extinction of 60% of western European mammalian lineages, which were subsequently replaced by Asian immigrants. The Grande Coupure is often dated directly to the Eocene-Oligocene boundary at 33.9 Ma, although some estimate that the event began slightly later, at 33.6–33.4 mya. The event occurred during or after the Eocene-Oligocene transition, an abrupt shift from a hot greenhouse world that characterised much of the Palaeogene to a coolhouse/icehouse world from the Early Oligocene onwards. The massive drop in temperatures results from the first major expansion of the Antarctic ice sheets that caused drastic pCO_{2} decreases and an estimated drop of ~70 m (230 ft) in sea level.

Many palaeontologists agree that glaciation and the resulting drops in sea level allowed for increased migrations between Balkanatolia and western Europe. The Turgai Strait, which once separated much of Europe from Asia, is often proposed as the main European seaway barrier prior to the Grande Coupure, but some researchers challenged this perception recently, arguing that it completely receded already 37 Ma, long before the Eocene-Oligocene transition. In 2022, Alexis Licht et al. suggested that the Grande Coupure could have possibly been synchronous with the Oi-1 glaciation (33.5 Ma), which records a decline in atmospheric CO_{2}, boosting the Antarctic glaciation that already started by the Eocene-Oligocene transition.

The Grande Coupure event also marked a large faunal turnover marking the arrivals of later anthracotheres, entelodonts, ruminants (Gelocidae, Lophiomerycidae), rhinocerotoids (Rhinocerotidae, Amynodontidae, Eggysodontidae), carnivorans (later Amphicyonidae, Amphicynodontidae, Nimravidae, and Ursidae), eastern Eurasian rodents (Eomyidae, Cricetidae, and Castoridae), and eulipotyphlans (Erinaceidae).

All three representatives Xiphodon, Dichodon, and Haplomeryx are last recorded in MP20 localities. The disappearances of the three genera meant the complete extinction of the Xiphodontidae. Many other artiodactyl genera from western Europe disappeared also as a result of the Grande Coupure extinction event. The extinctions of Xiphodon and many other mammals have been attributed to negative interactions with immigrant faunas (competition, predations), environmental changes from cooling climates, or some combination of the two. It was that found the diversity of endemic artiodactyls increased with the diversity of immigrant artiodactyls. In addition, the diversity of immigrant artiodactyls was negatively correlated with the extinction rate of endemic artiodactyls. This suggests immigrant artiodactyls did not play a role in the extinction of endemic artiodactyls.
