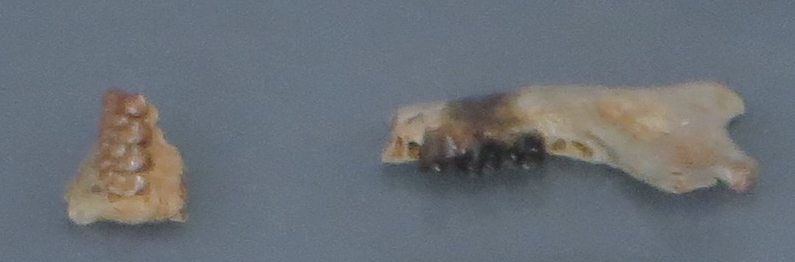
- Dentition of N. zuccolae

Scientific classification
- Kingdom: Animalia
- Phylum: Chordata
- Class: Mammalia
- Infraclass: Placentalia
- Order: Primates
- Family: †Omomyidae
- Subfamily: †Microchoerinae
- Genus: †Nannopithex; Stehlin, 1916

Species
- N. barnesi (Thalmann,1994); N. filholi (Chantre and Gaillard, 1897); N. humilidens (Thalmann, 1994); N. zuccolae(Godinot et al. 1992)

= Nannopithex =

Nannopithex Temporal range: Eocene–Eocene

Extinct genus of omomyid primate

Nannopithex is a genus of European omomyid primate from the Eocene.

== Description ==
Nannopithex lacks a second premolar, much like other omomyids. They have reduced lower canines and second incisors, alongside enlarged first incisors. The rather underived molars of Nannopithex indicate it is a very basal member of Microchoerinae.

== Classification ==
Nannopithex is closely related to Vectipithex, and 2 species formerly assigned to Nannopithex ('N'. raabi and 'N'.quaylei) have been moved to Vectipithex. Much like other Microchoerines, it is assumed Nannopithex resulted from a radiation event during the early Eocene.
