= Omomys =

Omomys Temporal range: Middle Eocene–Late Eocene
- 1, Reconstructed skeleton of Omomys carteri, shaded elements are known for Omomys carteri (Anemone & Covert, 2000); 2, artist reconstruction of Omomys carteri, based on known skeletal elements and newly discovered skull

Scientific classification
- Kingdom: Animalia
- Phylum: Chordata
- Class: Mammalia
- Order: Primates
- Family: †Omomyidae
- Genus: †Omomys; Leidy, 1869

Species
- Omomys carteri (Leidy, 1869); Omomys lloydi (Gazin, 1958)

Synonyms
- Euryacodon lepidus (Marsh, 1872)

Extinct genus of primate

Omomys is an extinct genus of omomyid primate from Middle Eocene North America.

== Description ==
The postcrania of Omomys suggest it was adapted for leaping, bearing long ischia and ilia. The mastoid part of the temporal bone was pneumatized. Compared to European microchoerines, Omomys was more basal in postcrania, lacking a prominent posterior talar shelf. Omomys is thought to have weighed around 300 grams.
