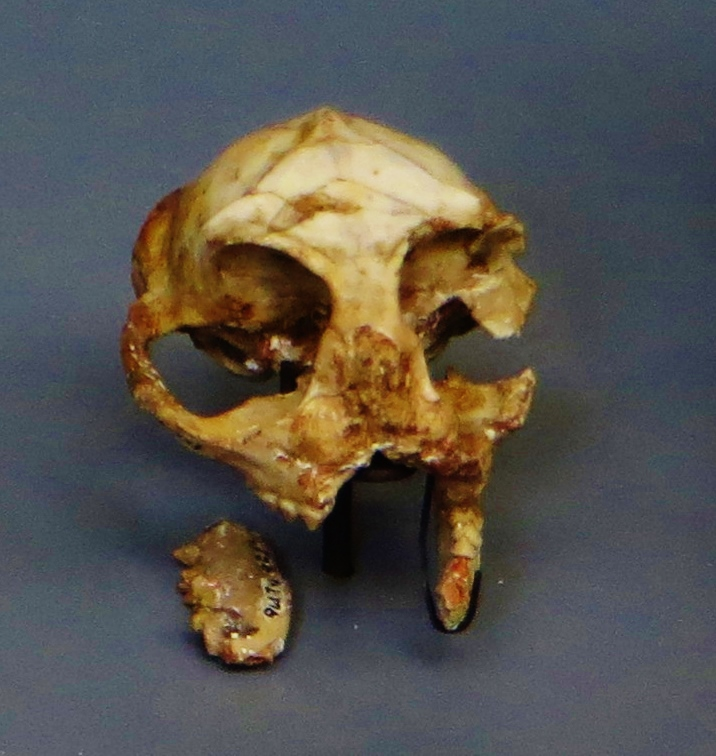
- Necrolemur

Scientific classification
- Kingdom: Animalia
- Phylum: Chordata
- Class: Mammalia
- Order: Primates
- Family: †Omomyidae
- Subfamily: †Microchoerinae; Lydekker, 1887

Genera
- Indusomys; Melaneremia; Microchoerus; Nannopithex; Necrolemur; Paraloris; Pseudoloris; Vectipithex

= Microchoerinae =

Microchoerinae Temporal range: Eocene–Oligocene

Extinct subfamily of primate

Microchoerinae is an extinct subfamily of omomyid primates.

== Description ==
Microchoerines are often found in Europe and are more derived in postcrania than some North American omomyids, like Omomys. They resemble tarsiers in form. Like most omomyids, they are speculated to be insectivores, and lived in trees.
