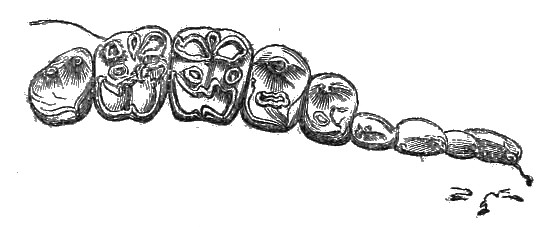
- Upper dentition of M. erinaceus

Scientific classification
- Kingdom: Animalia
- Phylum: Chordata
- Class: Mammalia
- Order: Primates
- Suborder: Haplorhini
- Family: †Omomyidae
- Subfamily: †Microchoerinae
- Genus: †Microchoerus; Wood 1844

Species
- M. woodi (Hooker, 1986); M. ornatus (Hooker, 1986); M. hookeri (Minwer-Barakat et al. 2017); M. erinaceus (Wood 1844); M. creechbarrowensis

= Microchoerus =

Microchoerus Temporal range: Late Eocene–Paleogene

Extinct primate

Microchoerus is a genus of extinct microchoerine primate from Late Eocene Europe.

== Description ==
Microchoerus is similar to most other microchoerines in bodyplan, In dentition, Microchoerus is unique due to the development of mesoconid and hypoconulid molars. The shapes of the molars has been used to distinguish evolutionary trends in the species of Microchoerus in the past.

== Paleoecology ==
Microchoerus lived in the Iberian Peninsula, which, during the Paleogene, was a rainforest. It shared the environment with many vertebrates, including indeterminate anurans, lacertids and cryptodirans. Mammal fauna consists of Elfomys, Peratherium, Xiphodon, Anoplotherium and Paramiacis, among others. Microchoerus was likely an arboreal insectivore.
