= Shoshonius =

Shoshonius Temporal range: 50 Ma Early Eocene

Scientific classification
- Kingdom: Animalia
- Phylum: Chordata
- Class: Mammalia
- Order: Primates
- Family: †Omomyidae
- Subfamily: †Omomyinae
- Tribe: †Washakiini
- Genus: †Shoshonius; Granger, 1910

Species
- †S. cooperi Granger, 1910 †S. bowni Honey, 1990

Extinct genus of primates

Shoshonius is an extinct genus of omomyid primate that lived during the Eocene (~56-34 million years ago). Specimens identified as Shoshonius have been found exclusively in central Wyoming and the genus currently includes two species, Shoshonius cooperi, described by Granger in 1910, and Shoshonius bowni, described by Honey in 1990.

The type specimen of S. cooperi is AMNH 14664, a right maxillary fragment preserving P3-M3. The type specimen of S. bowni is USGS 2020, a right maxillary fragment preserving M1-3. Based on elements of the postcranial skeleton, Shoshonius is inferred to be a generalized, arboreal quadruped with some affinities for vertical climbing and leaping. Additionally, dental morphology suggests the diet of Shoshonius was primarily insectivorous.

== Taxonomy ==
Current research places Shoshonius as the sister group of Tarsius within the suborder Haplorhini, a monophyletic clade which includes tarsiers, monkeys, apes, and humans. Tarsiers and Shoshonius share three unique cranial traits including a basioccipital phlange overlapping with the posteromedial bullar wall, a ventrolateral posterior carotid foramen, and a suprameatal foramen. Among primates, these features are unique to these two taxa, supporting the hypothesis that Shoshonius is the sister group to Tarsius.

== Cranial morphology ==
Shoshonius has larger eye orbits in proportion to its skull length when compared to other Eocene omomyids and the snout is much smaller, both of these traits are also observed in tarsiers. Shoshonius lacks a postorbital septum, similar to the strepsirrhines Necrolemur and Rooneyia. Noticeably, Shoshonius has a basioccipital phlange that overlaps with the bullar wall. The posterior carotid foramen ventrolaterally intersects the bulla. Shoshonius’ characteristically large orbits as well as the three cranial traits mentioned in the section above, are traits shared with tarsiers, which provides the main line of evidence which unites them taxonomically.

Dental morphology reveals that Shoshonius shares dental features with other omomyids, namely; upper molar mesostyles, a protocone fold on upper molars, and lower molar metastylids. Additionally, Shoshonius retains some dental morphologies that are found in early primitive primates, namely, small lower incisors, indicating their dentition was not specialized for gouging tree bark as seen in other omomoyids.

== Postcranial morphology and locomotor behavior ==
Analysis of postcranial morphology suggests that Shoshonius, like other omomyids, was quadrupedal with adaptations for leaping. The calcaneus of Shoshonius is elongated, although not to the extent seen in tarsiers, indicating that they may have had an affinity for leaping, but not the exceptional leaping abilities of tarsiers. Other aspects of the lower limb show similarities with modern day vertical clingers and leapers like tarsiers and galagoes, but the morphology of Shoshonius is not specialized to the extent seen in the modern taxa. Additionally, morphology of the upper limb of Shoshonius does not support vertical clinging and leaping as a locomotor behavior and instead shows similarities with other omomyids that were most likely more generalized quadrupeds.

The hypothesis of occasional leaping in Shoshonius was further corroborated in 2002 when Ryan and Ketchum published a bone volume fracture analysis of the femoral head of Shoshonius, Omomys, and multiple extant primate taxa with the hypothesis that the histologic structure of femoral heads could predict locomotor behavior. The results of this analysis showed that the histology of Shoshonius was most similar to that of the leaping galagoes and was significantly different than Omomys. The authors conclude that the histologic structure of the femur suggests Shoshonius was either an occasional or specialized leaper.
