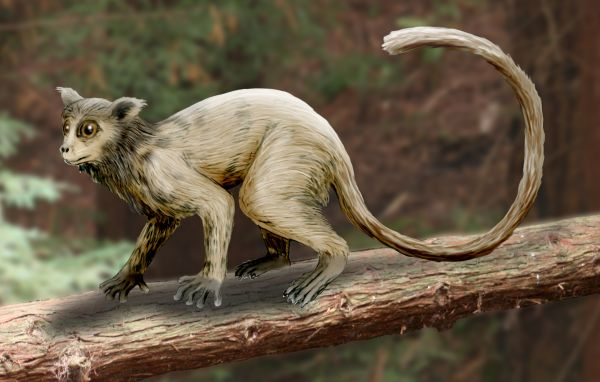
- Restoration

Scientific classification
- Kingdom: Animalia
- Phylum: Chordata
- Class: Mammalia
- Order: Primates
- Family: †Omomyidae
- Subfamily: †Microchoerinae
- Genus: †Necrolemur; Filhol, 1873

Species
- †N. antiquus Filhol, 1873 (type); †N. zitteli Schlosser, 1887; †N. anadoni Minwer-Barakat, Marigó & Moyà-Solà, 2015

= Necrolemur =

Necrolemur Temporal range: Middle Eocene–Late Eocene

Extinct genus of primates

Necrolemur is a small bodied omomyid with body mass estimations ranging from 114–346 g (4.0–12.2 oz). Necrolemur's teeth feature broad basins and blunt cusps, suggesting their diet consisted of mostly soft fruit, though examination of microwear patterns suggests that populations from lower latitudes also consumed insects and gums.

While they do not sport a true tooth comb like modern lemurs, microwear patterns on their lower incisors suggest they engaged in fur grooming behaviors. Like tarsiers, Necrolemur had large, front-facing, close set eyes and were likely nocturnal. Analysis of cranial and postcranial fossils by paleontologists suggest members of the family Omomyidae, including the genus Necrolemur, possessed highly specialized adaptations for leaping.

== Etymology ==
Necro- refers to the Greek prefix meaning death or dead while -lemur references extant lemuriforms due to Necrolemur's postcranial adaptations for prolific leaping like extant lemurs.

== Taxonomy ==
Several opinions have arisen regarding the origin of Necrolemur and its placement within primate phylogeny due to its tarsier-like cranium and anthropoid-like limbs. Since Filhol's original description of N. antiquus, the genus has been included in several different families, including Lemuridae in 1885, Microchoeridae in 1887, Anaptomorphidae in 1903, and Microchoeridae again in 1916. Revisions of European primate phylogeny in the 1930s placed Necrolemur in the family Necrolemuridae, alongside Nannopithex and Microchoerus.

Today, Necrolemur is situated in Microchoerinae, a subfamily of Omomyidae. While many paleontologists agree that Nannopithicus filholi is the most probable ancestor of Necrolemur, phylogenetic relationships between the three Necrolemur species are still unclear. This is due in part to the scarcity of material attributed to N. zitteli and N. anadoni, as well as the wide range of individual variation in the material attributed to N. antiquus. N. antiquus is very well represented in many middle and late Eocene localities ranging from MP16 to MP18 and is thought to have been sympatric with members of the Microchoerus genus in Spain.

With the 2015 description of N. anadoni, a new phylogeny was proposed, placing N. anadoni as the direct descendant of Nannopithex filholi and the precursor to Necrolemur antiquus and Microchoerus. This new phylogeny is supported by the intermediate size and morphological characters of N. anadoni compared to N. filholi and N. antiquus, particularly the progressive development of larger and more tubercular crests on the M2 and M3 across the three species.

== Cranial morphology ==
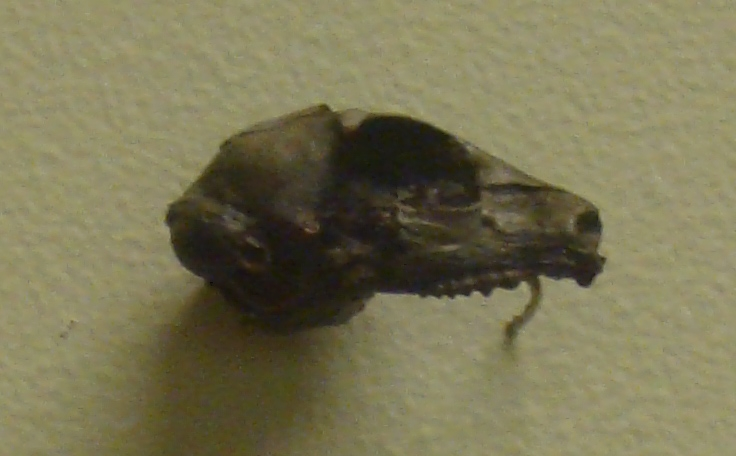
Necrolemur sp. skull

The cranium of Necrolemur is characterized by a very short, narrow rostrum and fairly large, convergent orbits. The orbits are partially separated from the temporal fossa by a simple postorbital bar.

The basicranium of Necrolemur is of particular interest due its combination of primitive and derived characters. The bony covering of the middle and inner ear, the auditory bullae, is simple and single chambered. The external auditory meatus, the external opening of the ear that leads to the eardrum, is tubular and extends laterally from the bullae. The ectotympanic bone, which anchors the eardrum, is fused to the inner wall of the auditory bulla. The posterior carotid foremen is located posteromedially on the bullar wall. The stem of the braincase is very narrow and the flanges of the posterior alisphenoid, which anchor muscles involved in chewing, overlap with the anterior wall of the bulla.

Posterior to the auditory bullae, the cranium features petromastoid inflation. Despite its unique auditory morphology, examination of the cochlear labyrinth of Necrolemur has concluded that they likely had no auditory specialization and had hearing thresholds similar to modern strepsirrhines.

== Dental morphology and diet ==
There are high levels of intraspecific and intrageneric variability in the upper and lower dentition of Necrolemur, which has been attributed to spatial and temporal differences in environment and resource availability. The dental formula for Necrolemur is 2.1.3.3/2.1.3.3 and the upper dentition is characterized by lateral positioning of the upper central incisors, a well developed hypocone on the first and second molars, and long, narrow premolars. Lower dentition is characterized by procumbent incisors, absent mesoconid and hypoconulid on the first and second molars, and wrinkling of the enamel of the cheek teeth. Though the lower incisors are procumbent, they do not form a true tooth comb as in lemuriform primates. However, examination of microwear striations on the incisors shows scratches running perpendicular to the apex of the tooth crowns, which may be evidence of fur grooming behavior.

Necrolemur cheek teeth are generally characterized by broad basins and blunt cusps, which suggests a diet made of soft fruit. However, examination of tooth microwear patterns of fossils from multiple latitudes have shown that Necrolemur was flexible in its diet and supplemented frugivory with insectivory and gummivory across different latitudes and as their environments changed over time.

== Postcranial morphology and locomotion ==
Similar to extant tarsiers but different from other omomyids, the ankles of Necrolemur show morphology typical of prolific leaping. The distal tibia and fibula are fused, and the distal calcaneus is extremely elongated. The tibiofibular synostosis stabilizes the ankle joint and prevents side to side wobble during movement. The elongation of the calcaneus acts as a long lever and provides biomechanical advantage and efficiency for rapid flexion and extension of the ankle. The sturdy ankle joint and long lever-like calcaneus suggests that Necrolemur was a prolific leaper.

The astragalus also shows similarities to tarsiers. The bone has a large angle between the head and body and the sides of the trochlea are steep and straight. On the astragalar neck, there is a deep pit bordered anteriorly by a ridge of bone. This pit and ridge of bone serves as a stop for the tibia during flexion. The neck of the astragalus is relatively short in comparison to the total length of the bone, whereas in the majority of strepsirrhines and tarsiers the neck comprises roughly half of the total bone length. Similarities between the foot of Necrolemur and tarsiers are best seen as evolutionary convergences, with the precise method of locomotion evolving independently from extant Tarsiiformes.

Paradoxically, the hips of Necrolemur resembles those of anthropoids: the femoral head is spherical and the femoral neck is very long and projects at a lower angle from the shaft compared to other omomyids. The proximal shaft of the femur is also bowed anteriorly. Individually, these unique features of Necrolemur's proximal femur can be found in other prosimians, but this combination is found only in anthropoids. It is likely that Necrolemur used a form of locomotion similar to modern Tarsiiformes, but the precise biomechanics that achieved this locomotion differ from tarsiers and lemuriforms.
