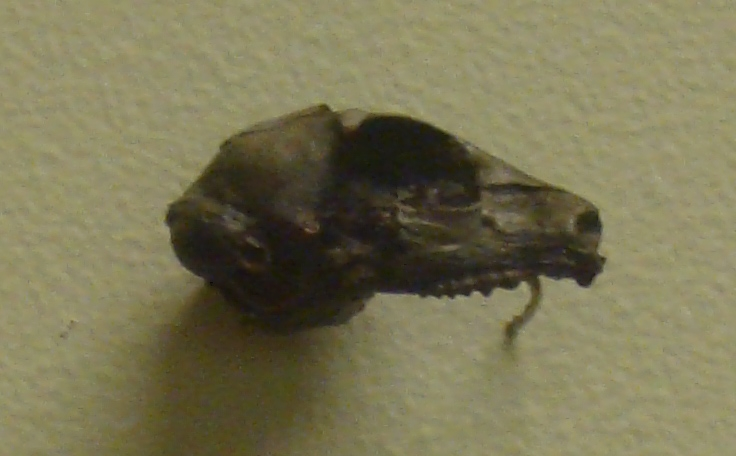
- The skull of Necrolemur

Scientific classification
- Kingdom: Animalia
- Phylum: Chordata
- Class: Mammalia
- Order: Primates
- Clade: †Omomyiformes
- Superfamily: †Omomyoidea
- Family: †Omomyidae; Trouessart, 1879

Subgroups
- †Anaptomorphinae; †Microchoerinae; †Omomyinae; †Tarkadectinae; Tarsiidae (cladistically included)

Synonyms
- Tarsiiformes

= Omomyidae =

Omomyidae Temporal range: 56–34 Ma Late Paleocene – Oligocene Possible descendant taxon Tarsiidae survives to present

Extinct family of primates

Omomyidae is a family of early primates that radiated during the Eocene epoch between about 55 to 34 million years ago (mya). Fossil omomyids are found in North America, Europe & Asia, making it one of two groups of Eocene primates with a geographic distribution spanning holarctic continents, the other being the adapids (family Adapidae). Early representatives of the Omomyidae and Adapidae appear suddenly at the beginning of the Eocene (56 mya) in North America, Europe, and Asia, and are the earliest known crown primates.

Omomyids are generally regarded as closely related to or within the Tarsiiformes, and thus most closely related to tarsiers among living primates.

== Characteristics ==
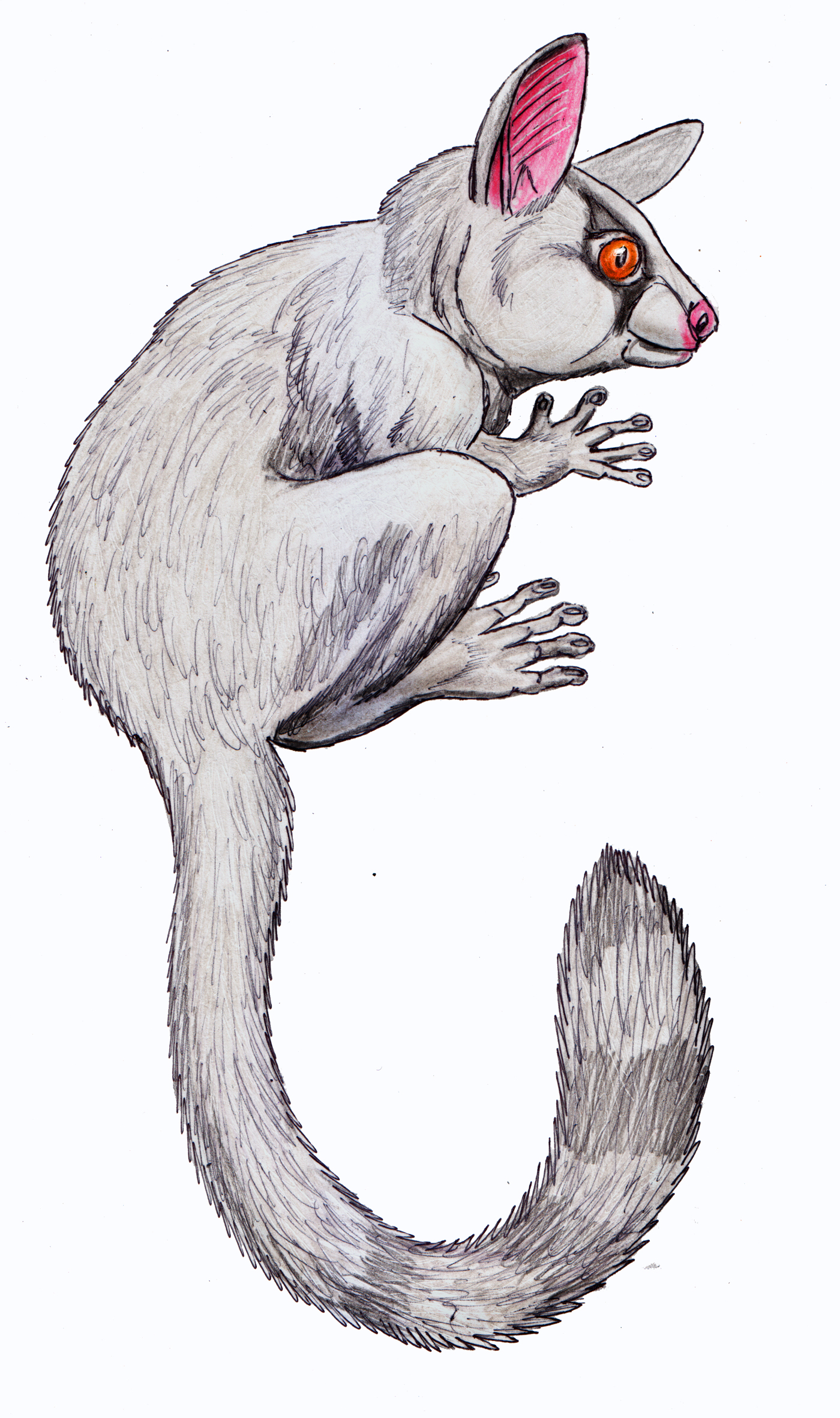
Life restoration of Teilhardina

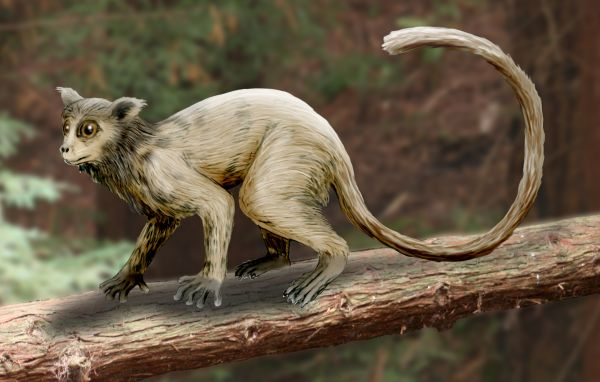
Life restoration of Necrolemur

Features that characterize many omomyids include large eye sockets, shortened rostra and dental arcades, loss of anterior premolars, cheek teeth adapted for insectivorous or frugivorous diets, and relatively small body mass (i.e., less than 500 g). However, by the late middle Eocene (about 40 mya), some North American omomyids evolved body masses in excess of 1 kg (2.2 lb) and frugivorous or folivorous diets. The largest omomyids were Macrotarsius and Ourayia, both at 1.5–2 kg (3.3–4.4 lb) in weight. Large orbits in genera such as Tetonius, Shoshonius, Necrolemur, and Microchoerus indicate that these taxa were probably nocturnal. At least one omomyid genus from the late Eocene of Texas (Rooneyia) had small orbits and was probably diurnal.

Like primates alive today, omomyids had grasping hands and feet with digits tipped by nails instead of claws, although they possessed toilet claws like modern lemurs. Features of their skeletons strongly indicate that omomyids lived in trees. In at least one genus (Necrolemur), the lower leg bones, the tibia and fibula, were fused as in modern tarsiers. This feature may indicate that Necrolemur leaped frequently. Most other omomyid genera (e.g., Omomys) lack specializations for leaping, and their skeletons are more like those of living dwarf and mouse lemurs.

Omomyid systematics and evolutionary relationships are controversial. Authors have suggested that omomyids are either:

1. stem haplorhines [i.e., basal members of the group including living tarsiers and anthropoids].
2. stem tarsiiformes [i.e., basal offshoots of the tarsier lineage].
3. stem primates more closely related to adapids than to living primate taxa.

Recent research suggests the Omomyiformes are stem haplorhines, making them likely a paraphyletic grouping.

Attempts to link omomyids to living groups have been complicated by their primitive (plesiomorphic) skeletal anatomy. For example, omomyids lack the numerous skeletal specializations of living haplorhines. These haplorhine adaptations – absent in omomyids – include:

1. significant reduction of the canal for the stapedial branch of the internal carotid artery.
2. route of the canal to house the promontory branch of the internal carotid artery through the auditory bulla of the temporal bone, i.e. "perbullar" (rather than across the promontory of tympanic cavity, "transpromontorial").
3. contact between the alisphenoid and zygomatic bones.
4. presence of an anterior accessory cavity confluent with the tympanic cavity.

Omomyids further demonstrate a gap between the upper central incisors, which presumably indicates the presence of a rhinarium and philtrum to channel fluids into the vomeronasal organ. Omomyids as a group also lack most of the derived specializations of living tarsiers, such as extremely enlarged orbits (Shoshonius is a possible exception), a large supra-meatal foramen for an anastomosis between the posterior auricular and middle meningeal circulation (again, Shoshonius is a possible exception, but the contents of the foramen in this extinct taxon are unknown), and extreme postcranial adaptations for leaping.

Among primates, omomyids have a uniquely derived characteristic. This is the ectotympanic bone being concealed within the auditory bulla, connected to the lateral wall by an unbroken annular bridge.

== Classification ==
The exact taxonomy of Omomyidae is contested, as many authors question if Omomyidae represents a real monophyletic group. These authors propose that "Omomyidae" should be split into two groups, Tarsiidae (including living tarsiers) for more derived large-eyed members and Anaptomorphidae for more basal small-eyed members. Despite this, Omomyidae is still oftentimes used in literature, and the subfamilies are arranged as follows.

- Family Omomyidae
  - Subfamily Anaptomorphinae
  - Subfamily Microchoerinae
  - Subfamily Omomyinae

Unranked or contested genera within Omomyidae include:

- Altanius – Debated to be a basal omomyid or a basal adapid
- Kohatius – Unknown placement due to poor material
