= Haplomeryx =

Haplomeryx Temporal range: Middle–Late Eocene (Lutetian to Priabonian) 43.5–33.9 Ma

Scientific classification
- Kingdom: Animalia
- Phylum: Chordata
- Class: Mammalia
- Order: Artiodactyla
- Family: †Xiphodontidae
- Genus: †Haplomeryx; Schlosser, 1886

Type species
- †Haplomeryx zitteli Schlosser, 1886

Other species
- †H? obliquus Cuvier, 1822; †H. picteti Stehlin, 1910; †H. egerkingensis Stehlin, 1910; †H. euzetensis Depéret, 1917

Extinct genus of endemic Palaeogene European artiodactyls

Haplomeryx is an extinct genus of Palaeogene artiodactyls belonging to the family Xiphodontidae. It was endemic to Western Europe and lived from the Middle to Late Eocene. Haplomeryx was first established as a genus by the German naturalist Max Schlosser in 1886 based on a molar tooth set from Quercy Phosphorites deposits. Three additional species were erected and classified to the xiphodontid genus while one other species, first recognized in 1822, was tentatively classified to it and remains unresolved in affinity.

Little is known about Haplomeryx due to its poor cranial and postcranial fossil records. Its dentition is thought to have been typical of xiphodonts such as Xiphodon and Dichodon because of most of its premolars being elongated, its dental differences being more specific compared to the other two genera. Although it may have displayed an evolutionary size increase by species, all of them remained very small in size especially in comparison to the two other xiphodont genera. It lived in western Europe back when it was an archipelago that was isolated from the rest of Eurasia, meaning that it lived in a tropical-subtropical environment with various other faunas that also evolved with strong levels of endemism. This meant that it coexisted with a wide variety of other artiodactyls and perissodactyls including the aforementioned xiphodont genera.

It and other xiphodont genera went extinct by the Grande Coupure extinction/faunal turnover event, coinciding with shifts towards further glaciation and seasonality plus dispersals of Asian immigrant faunas into western Europe. The causes of its extinction are attributed to negative interactions with immigrant faunas (resource competition, predation), environmental turnover from climate change, or some combination of the two.

== Taxonomy ==
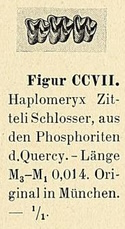
Haplomeryx zittleli upper molars

In 1886, the German naturalist Max Schlosser erected the genus Haplomeryx, known solely from selenodont molars from the Quercy Phosphorites. He proposed that its dentition is most similar to that of Agriochoerus and established the species Haplomeryx zitteli based on an upper jaw fragment consisting of three molars that in total measure 14 mm (0.55 in) long. He noted its small size and theorized that it was the only European member of mammals that were of close affinities with the North American Agriochoerus. The etymology of the genus name derives in Ancient Greek from ἁπλόος (simple) and μήρυξ (ruminant) meaning "simple ruminant".

In 1910, the Swiss palaeontologist Hans Georg Stehlin made a review of Haplomeryx amongst other European artiodactyls, stating that he did not notice its fossils having been previously described under any synonymous name and that its overall anatomy is not known. The first species he erected was H. Picteti based on fossil previously described from Mormont in Switzerland, noting that the teeth are smaller than those of H. zitteli and that it has slightly different molar morphologies. The second and other species that Stehlin named was H. egerkingensis based on dentition from the Swiss municipality of Egerkingen. He also tentatively reclassified the species Dichobune obliquum, previously described by the French naturalist Georges Cuvier in 1822 as Anoplotherium (Dichobune) obliquum, to Haplomeryx as H? obliquus. H? obliquus is known only by a single specimen from Montmartre in France, thus making its affinities problematic to resolve.

The French palaeontologist Charles Depéret established the species H. Euzetensis based on dental fossils from the French commune of Euzet in 1917. He said that the species was intermediate in size between H. zitteli and H. picteti.

=== Classification ===
Haplomeryx belongs to the Xiphodontidae, a Palaeogene artiodactyl family endemic to western Europe that lived from the Middle Eocene to the Early Oligocene (~44 Ma to 33 Ma). Like the other contemporary endemic artiodactyl families of western Europe, the evolutionary origins of the Xiphodontidae are poorly known. The Xiphodontidae is generally thought to have first appeared by MP14 of the Mammal Palaeogene zones, making them the first selenodont dentition artiodactyl representatives to have appeared in the landmass along with the Amphimerycidae. More specifically, the first xiphodont representatives to appear were the genera Dichodon and Haplomeryx by MP14. Dichodon and Haplomeryx continued to persist into the Late Eocene while Xiphodon made its first appearance by MP16. Another xiphodont Paraxiphodon is known to have occurred only in MP17a localities. The former three genera lived up to the Early Oligocene where they have been recorded to have all gone extinct as a result of the Grande Coupure faunal turnover event.

The phylogenetic relations of the Xiphodontidae as well as the Anoplotheriidae, Mixtotheriidae and Cainotheriidae have been elusive due to the selenodont morphologies (or having crescent-shaped ridges) of the molars, which were convergent with tylopods or ruminants. Some researchers considered the selenodont families Anoplotheriidae, Xiphodontidae, and Cainotheriidae to be within Tylopoda due to postcranial features that were similar to the tylopods from North America in the Palaeogene. Other researchers tie them as being more closely related to ruminants than tylopods based on dental morphology. Different phylogenetic analyses have produced different results for the "derived" (or of new evolutionary traits) selenodont Eocene European artiodactyl families, making it uncertain whether they were closer to the Tylopoda or Ruminantia. Possibly, the Xiphodontidae may have arisen from an unknown dichobunoid group, thus making its resemblance to tylopods an instance of convergent evolution.

In an article published in 2019, Romain Weppe et al. conducted a phylogenetic analysis on the Cainotherioidea within the Artiodactyla based on mandibular and dental characteristics, specifically in terms of relationships with artiodactyls of the Palaeogene. The results retrieved that the superfamily was closely related to the Mixtotheriidae and Anoplotheriidae. They determined that the Cainotheriidae, Robiacinidae, Anoplotheriidae, and Mixtotheriidae formed a clade that was the sister group to the Ruminantia while Tylopoda, along with the Amphimerycidae and Xiphodontidae split earlier in the tree. The phylogenetic tree published in the article and another work about the cainotherioids is outlined below:

- - Eurodexis russelli
  - Dichobune leporina
  - - - Amphimeryx murinus
      - - Xiphodon castrense
        - Tylopoda
          - Paratoceras coatesi
          - Eotylopus reedi
    - - Ruminantia
        - Parvitragulus priscus
        - - Lophiomeryx chalaniati
          - Archaeomeryx optatus
      - - Mixtotheriidae
          Mixtotherium cuspidatum
        - Anoplotheriidae
          - Anoplotherium latipes
          - Dacrytherium ovinum
        - Cainotherioidea
          - Robiacinidae
            - Robiacina lavergnesis
            - - Robiacina minuta
              - Robiacina quercyi
          - Cainotheriidae
            - Palembertina deplasi
            - - Oxacroninae
                - Paroxacron bergeri
                - - Paroxacron valdense
                  - Oxacron courtoisii
              - Cainotheriinae
                - Cainotherium laticurvatum
                - - Caenomeryx
                    - Caenomeryx filholi
                    - Caenomeryx procommunis
                  - Plesiomeryx
                    - Plesiomeryx cadurcensis
                    - Plesiomeryx huerzeleri

In 2022, Weppe created a phylogenetic analysis in his academic thesis regarding Palaeogene artiodactyl lineages, focusing most specifically on the endemic European families. He stated that his phylogeny was the first formal one to propose affinities of the Xiphodontidae and Anoplotheriidae. He found that the Anoplotheriidae, Mixtotheriidae, and Cainotherioidea form a clade based on synapomorphic dental traits (traits thought to have originated from their most recent common ancestor). The result, Weppe mentioned, matches up with previous phylogenetic analyses on the Cainotherioidea with other endemic European Palaeogene artiodactyls that support the families as a clade. As a result, he argued that the proposed superfamily Anoplotherioidea, composing of the Anoplotheriidae and Xiphodontidae as proposed by Alan W. Gentry and Hooker in 1988, is invalid due to the polyphyly of the lineages in the phylogenetic analysis. However, the Xiphodontidae was still found to compose part of a wider clade with the three other groups. Within the Xiphodontidae, Weppe's phylogeny tree classified Haplomeryx as a sister taxon to the clade consisting of Xiphodon plus Dichodon.

== Description ==
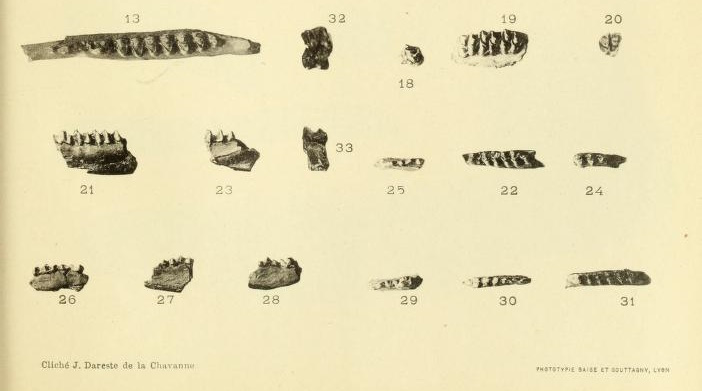
H. euzetensis dental remains and astragalus

Unlike both Xiphodon and Dichodon with known evidence of complete sets of 44 teeth, the number of teeth present in Haplomeryx is unclear since it is only known by its sets of 3 molars, 4 premolars, and, in the case of H. zitteli, possibly a canine. Xiphodonts are characterized by indistinct canines in comparison to other teeth and elongated premolars. Xiphodontids additionally have molariform P^{4} teeth, upper molars with 4 to 5 crescent-shaped cusps, and selenodont lower molars with 4 ridges, compressed lingual cuspids, and crescent-shaped labial cuspids.

Haplomeryx is not as well-described compared to Xiphodon or Dichodon. The upper molars are brachyodont (low-crowned) and have four crescent-shaped cusps, although H. egerkingensis has an additional small paraconule cusp. They also have W-shaped ectolophs (crests or ridges of upper molar teeth), curved mesostyle cusps, hollowed labial walls of the paracone plus mesocone cusps, and conical protocone cusps that are connected to the parastyle cusps. The P^{4} tooth appears short and triangular, and its lingual cusp is crescent-shaped. The lower premolars, with the exception of P_{4}, are elongated in form. Its dentition appears similar to that of Dichodon, the main difference being that the parastyle cusp of Haplomeryx appears to be more prominent. The astragalus originally assigned to H. euzetensis is narrow and elongated, appearing slightly slanted at its bottom end similar to those of Dacrytherium and Xiphodon. According to Hooker and Weidmann, however, it actually belonged to Pseudamphimeryx; they instead reassigned an astragalus from Leptotheridium to Haplomeryx. The astragalus that was reassigned to Haplomeryx was described by Depéret as being very narrow and elongated with a narrow tibial groove and a straight bone axis.

Haplomeryx is also diagnosed as being very small in size. While Haplomeryx may have displayed evolutionary size increases, it remained small-sized unlike Xiphodon and Dichodon, which both were both capable to growing to medium sizes. According to Jean Sudre, the upper molars belonging to H. picteti, H. euzetensis, and H. zitteli progressed in evolutionary chronology by increased sizes.

== Palaeoecology ==
=== Middle Eocene ===
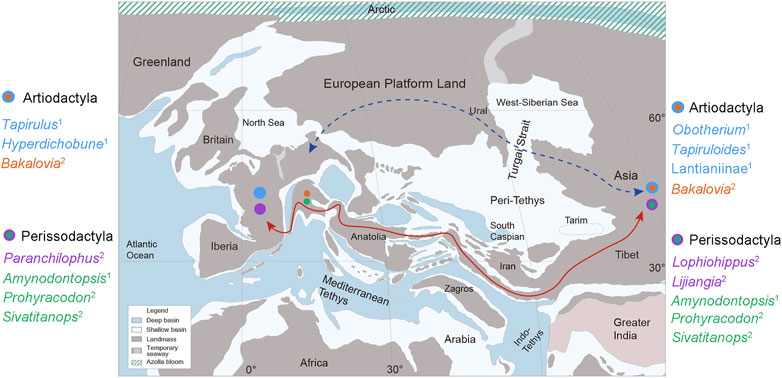
Palaeogeography of Europe and Asia during the Middle Eocene with possible artiodactyl and perissodactyl dispersal routes.

For much of the Eocene, a hothouse climate with humid, tropical environments with consistently high precipitations prevailed. Modern mammalian orders including the Perissodactyla, Artiodactyla, and Primates (or the suborder Euprimates) appeared already by the Early Eocene, diversifying rapidly and developing dentitions specialized for folivory. The omnivorous forms mostly either switched to folivorous diets or went extinct by the Middle Eocene (47–37 million years ago) along with the archaic "condylarths". By the Late Eocene (approx. 37–33 mya), most of the ungulate form dentitions shifted from bunodont (or rounded) cusps to cutting ridges (i.e. lophs) for folivorous diets.

Land connections between western Europe and North America were interrupted around 53 Ma. From the Early Eocene up until the Grande Coupure extinction event (56–33.9 mya), western Eurasia was separated into three landmasses: western Europe (an archipelago), Balkanatolia (in-between the Paratethys Sea of the north and the Neotethys Ocean of the south), and eastern Eurasia. The Holarctic mammalian faunas of western Europe were therefore mostly isolated from other landmasses including Greenland, Africa, and eastern Eurasia, allowing for endemism to develop. Therefore, the European mammals of the Late Eocene (MP17–MP20 of the Mammal Palaeogene zones) were mostly descendants of endemic Middle Eocene groups.

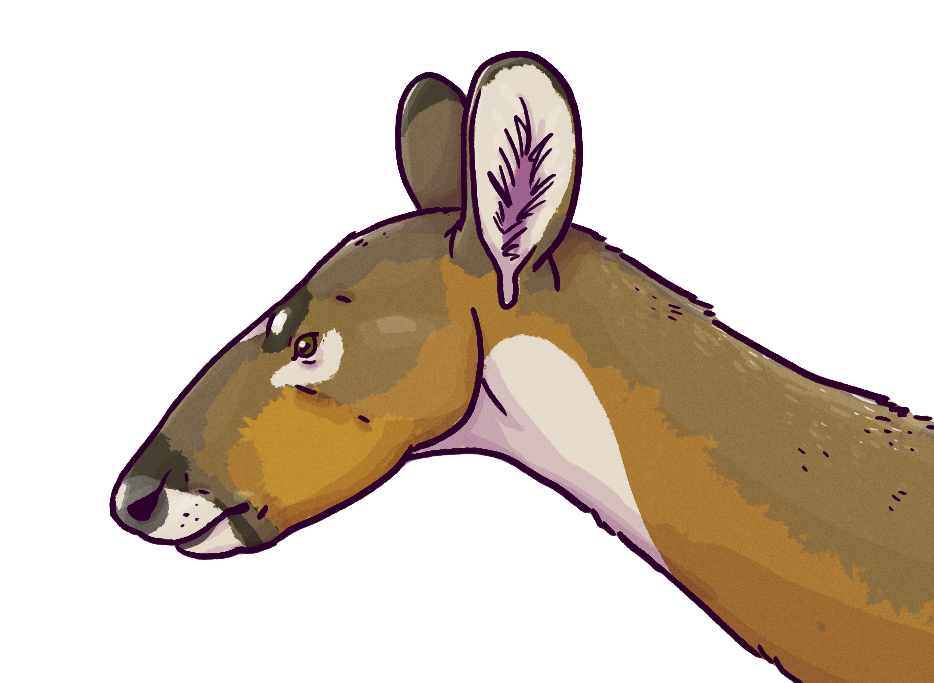
Reconstruction of Dichodon, which had coexisted with Haplomeryx throughout the later Eocene

The earliest species of Haplomeryx to appear in the fossil record is H. egerkingensis based on its restricted appearances at the Swiss localities of Egerkingen-Huppersand (MP13? or MP14?) and Egerkingen α + β (MP14). By then, it would have coexisted with perissodactyls (Palaeotheriidae, Lophiodontidae, and Hyrachyidae), non-endemic artiodactyls (Dichobunidae and Tapirulidae), endemic European artiodactyls (Choeropotamidae, Cebochoeridae, and Anoplotheriidae), and primates (Adapidae). The Amphimerycidae made its first appearance by the level MP14. The stratigraphic ranges of the early species of Haplomeryx also overlapped with metatherians (Herpetotheriidae), cimolestans (Pantolestidae, Paroxyclaenidae), rodents (Ischyromyidae, Theridomyoidea, Gliridae), eulipotyphlans, bats, apatotherians, carnivoraformes (Miacidae), and hyaenodonts (Hyainailourinae, Proviverrinae). Other MP13-MP14 sites have also yielded fossils of turtles and crocodylomorphs, and MP13 sites are stratigraphically the latest to have yielded remains of the bird clades Gastornithidae and Palaeognathae.

Based on the Egerkingen α + β locality, H. egerkingensis coexisted with the herpetotheriid Amphiperatherium, ischyromyids Ailuravus and Plesiarctomys, pseudosciurid Treposciurus, omomyid Necrolemur, adapid Leptadapis, proviverrine Proviverra, palaeotheres (Propalaeotherium, Anchilophus, Lophiotherium, Plagiolophus, Palaeotherium), hyrachyid Chasmotherium, lophiodont Lophiodon, dichobunids Hyperdichobune and Mouillacitherium, choeropotamid Rhagatherium, anoplotheriid Catodontherium, amphimerycid Pseudamphimeryx, cebochoerid Cebochoerus, tapirulid Tapirulus, mixtotheriid Mixtotherium, and the xiphodont Dichodon.

MP16 marks the first appearances of the species H. euzetensis and H. picteti based on their occurrences in French localities such as Lavergne. In Lavergne, fossils of the two Haplomeryx species were found with those of the herpetotheriids Amphiperatherium and Peratherium, pseudorhyncocyonid Leptictidium, nyctitheres Euronyctia and Saturninia, omomyids Necrolemur and Pseudoloris, theridomyids (Burgia, Elfomys, Glamys, Idicia), bats (Carcinipteryx, Hipposideros, Vaylatsia), proviverrine Allopterodon, carnivoraformes Quercygale and Paramiacis, cebochoerids Acotherulum and Cebochoerus, anoplotheriids Catodontherium and Dacrytherium, mixtothere Mixtotherium, dichobunids Dichobune and Mouillacitherium, amphimerycid Pseudamphimeryx, and the xiphodont Dichodon.

After MP16, faunal turnover occurred, marking the disappearances of the lophiodonts and European hyrachyids as well as the extinctions of all European crocodylomorphs except for the alligatoroid Diplocynodon. The causes of the faunal turnover have been attributed to a shift from humid and highly tropical environments to drier and more temperate forests with open areas and more abrasive vegetation. The surviving herbivorous faunas shifted their dentitions and dietary strategies accordingly to adapt to abrasive and seasonal vegetation. The environments were still subhumid and full of subtropical evergreen forests, however. The Palaeotheriidae was the sole remaining European perissodactyl group, and frugivorous-folivorous or purely folivorous artiodactyls became the dominant group in western Europe.

=== Late Eocene ===
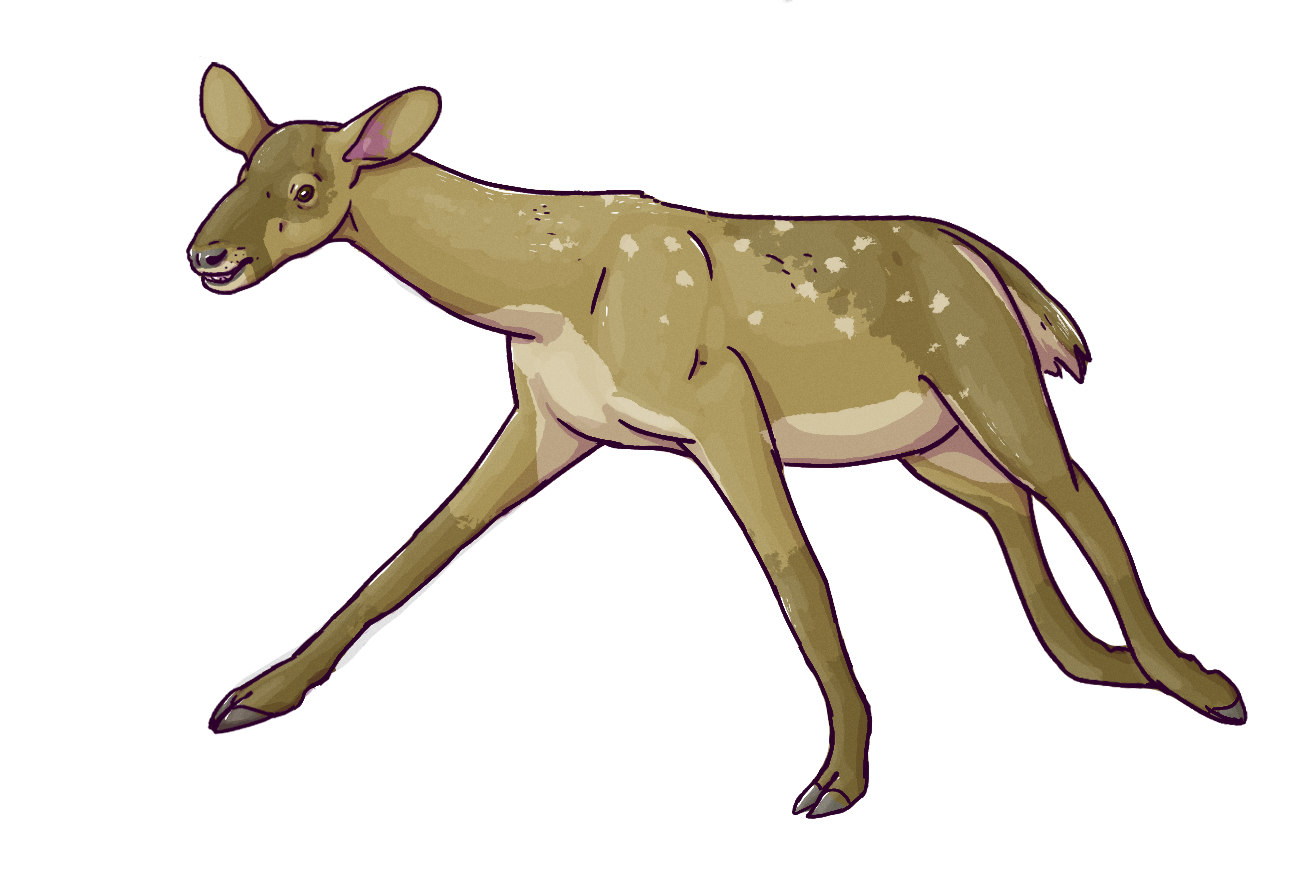
Reconstruction of Xiphodon, which the other xiphodonts Dichodon and Haplomeryx both frequently cooccurred with

In the Late Eocene, multiple species of Haplomeryx occur in western Europe. the temporal range of H. euzetensis continued up to MP18, whereas that of H. picteti extended up to either MP17b or MP18 based on its occurrence in the French locality of Enrouane R1. H. zitteli made its first appearance at MP18 and extended up to the MP20 range while H? obliquus occurred exclusively at the MP19 level. By that time, the Cainotheriidae and the derived anoplotheriids Anoplotherium and Diplobune both made their first fossil record appearances by MP18. In addition, several migrant mammal groups had reached western Europe by MP17a-MP18, namely the Anthracotheriidae, Hyaenodontinae, and Amphicyonidae. In addition to snakes, frogs, and salamandrids, rich assemblage of lizards are known in western Europe as well from MP16-MP20, representing the Iguanidae, Lacertidae, Gekkonidae, Agamidae, Scincidae, Helodermatidae, and Varanoidea, most of which were able to thrive in the warm temperatures of western Europe.

In the MP19 locality of Escamps, H. zitteli is recorded to have cooccurred with the likes of the herpetotheriids Amphiperatherium and Peratherium, pseudorhyncocyonid Pseudorhyncocyon, nyctitheres Saturninia and Amphidozotherium, bats (Hipposideros, Vaylatsia, Stehlinia), theridomyids (Paradelomys, Elfomys, Blainvillimys, Theridomys), adapid Palaeolemur, hyainailourine Pterodon, amphicyonid Cynodictis, palaeotheres Palaeotherium and Plagiolophus, dichobunid Dichobune, choeropotamid Choeropotamus, anoplotheriids Anoplotherium and Diplobune, cainotheres Oxacron and Paroxacron, amphimerycid Amphimeryx, and the other xiphodonts Xiphodon and Dichodon.

== Extinction ==
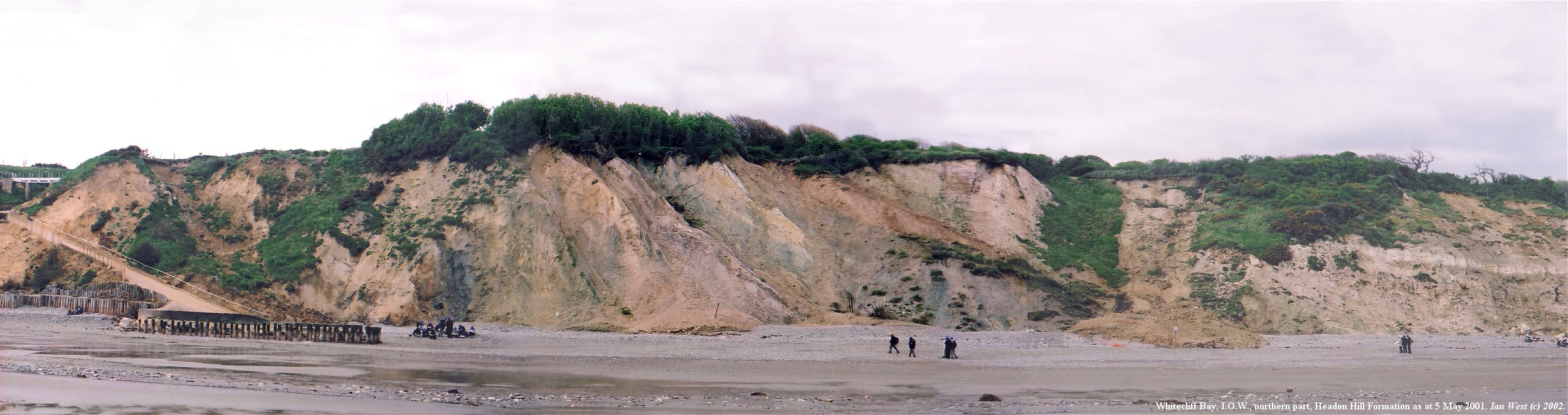
A panorama of the Headon Hill Formation in the Isle of Wight. The stratigraphy of it and the Bouldnor Formation led to better understandings of faunal chronologies from the Late Eocene up to the Grande Coupure.

The Grande Coupure event during the latest Eocene to earliest Oligocene (MP20-MP21) is one of the largest and most abrupt faunal turnovers in the Cenozoic of Western Europe and coincident with climate forcing events of cooler and more seasonal climates. The event led to the extinction of 60% of western European mammalian lineages, which were subsequently replaced by Asian immigrants. The Grande Coupure is often dated directly to the Eocene-Oligocene boundary at 33.9 Ma, although some estimate that the event began slightly later, at 33.6–33.4 mya. The event occurred during or after the Eocene-Oligocene transition, an abrupt shift from a hot greenhouse world that characterised much of the Palaeogene to a coolhouse/icehouse world from the Early Oligocene onwards. The massive drop in temperatures results from the first major expansion of the Antarctic ice sheets that caused drastic pCO_{2} decreases and an estimated drop of ~70 m (230 ft) in sea level.

Many palaeontologists agree that glaciation and the resulting drops in sea level allowed for increased migrations between Balkanatolia and western Europe. The Turgai Strait, which once separated much of Europe from Asia, is often proposed as the main European seaway barrier prior to the Grande Coupure, but some researchers challenged this perception recently, arguing that it completely receded already 37 Ma, long before the Eocene-Oligocene transition. In 2022, Alexis Licht et al. suggested that the Grande Coupure could have possibly been synchronous with the Oi-1 glaciation (33.5 Ma), which records a decline in atmospheric CO_{2}, boosting the Antarctic glaciation that already started by the Eocene-Oligocene transition.

The Grande Coupure event also marked a large faunal turnover marking the arrivals of later anthracotheres, entelodonts, ruminants (Gelocidae, Lophiomerycidae), rhinocerotoids (Rhinocerotidae, Amynodontidae, Eggysodontidae), carnivorans (later Amphicyonidae, Amphicynodontidae, Nimravidae, and Ursidae), eastern Eurasian rodents (Eomyidae, Cricetidae, and Castoridae), and eulipotyphlans (Erinaceidae).

Despite previous suggestions that the last appearance of H. zitteli was by MP20, some authors suggested that Haplomeryx had an unresolved stratigraphic range and that it may have disappeared by MP19. Recent evidence attests to all three representatives Xiphodon, Dichodon, and Haplomeryx having been last recorded in MP20 localities. The disappearances of the three genera meant the complete extinction of the Xiphodontidae. Many other artiodactyl genera from western Europe disappeared also as a result of the Grande Coupure extinction event. The extinctions of Haplomeryx and many other mammals have been attributed to negative interactions with immigrant faunas (competition, predations), environmental changes from cooling climates, or some combination of the two.
