= Paraxiphodon =

Paraxiphodon Temporal range: Middle Eocene to Late Eocene 43.5–37 Ma

Scientific classification
- Kingdom: Animalia
- Phylum: Chordata
- Class: Mammalia
- Order: Artiodactyla
- Family: †Xiphodontidae
- Genus: †Paraxiphodon; Sudre, 1978
- Species: †P. teulonensis

Binomial name
- †Paraxiphodon teulonensis Sudre, 1978

Extinct genus of endemic Palaeogene European artiodactyls

Paraxiphodon is an extinct genus of Palaeogene artiodactyls belonging to the Xiphodontidae that lived in western Europe during the Late Eocene. It was named by Jean Sudre and contains only one species P. teulonensis. It is similar in size to the close relative Xiphodon and, although differing little from the genus, is recorded to be distinct based on specific premolar traits. It is currently only known from deposits at a specific French location, meaning that its temporal range is seemingly small.

== Taxonomy ==
In 1978, the French palaeontologist Jean Sudre erected the genus Paraxiphodon based on fossils from multiple localities in Fons at France (Fons 1, 4, and 5), arguing that it forms a xiphodont lineage separate from Xiphodon. He erected two species for the genus: the type species Paraxiphodon teulonensis from the Fons deposits and P. cournovense from the locality of Robiac. The species name P. teulonensis derives from a stream near the Fons deposits called Teulon. In 1988, based on additional fossil materials from Le Bretou as well as older Quercy collections from the University of Montpellier, he relocated P. cournovense into its own genus Robiatherium, classified within the Anoplotheriidae. In 2022 as part of his PhD dissertation, Romain Weppe suggested that Paraxiphodon is synonymous with Xiphodon, although he did not elaborate on the status of its only species or why he considered it to be a synonym.

=== Classification ===
Paraxiphodon belongs to the Xiphodontidae, a Palaeogene artiodactyl family endemic to western Europe that lived from the middle Eocene to the early Oligocene (~44 Ma to 33 Ma). Like the other contemporary endemic artiodactyl families of western Europe, the evolutionary origins of the Xiphodontidae are poorly known. While Xiphodon had been thought to have appeared as early as MP10 of the Mammal Palaeogene zones based on one locality, this allocation is based on very poor fossil material. Instead, the Xiphodontidae is generally thought to have first appeared by MP14, making them the first selenodont dentition artiodactyl representatives to have appeared in the landmass along with the Amphimerycidae. More specifically, the first xiphodont representatives to appear were the genera Dichodon and Haplomeryx. Dichodon and Haplomeryx continued to persist into the Late Eocene while Xiphodon made its first appearance by MP16. Paraxiphodon is known to have occurred only in MP17a localities. The former three genera lived up to the Early Oligocene where they have been recorded to have all gone extinct as a result of the Grande Coupure faunal turnover event.

The phylogenetic relations of the Xiphodontidae as well as the Anoplotheriidae, Mixtotheriidae and Cainotheriidae have been elusive due to the selenodont morphologies (or having crescent-shaped ridges) of the molars, which were convergent with tylopods or ruminants. Some researchers considered the selenodont families Anoplotheriidae, Xiphodontidae, and Cainotheriidae to be within Tylopoda due to postcranial features that were similar to the tylopods from North America in the Palaeogene. Other researchers tie them as being more closely related to ruminants than tylopods based on dental morphology. Different phylogenetic analyses have produced different results for the "derived" (or of new evolutionary traits) selenodont Eocene European artiodactyl families, making it uncertain whether they were closer to the Tylopoda or Ruminantia. Possibly, the Xiphodontidae may have arisen from an unknown dichobunoid group, thus making its resemblance to tylopods an instance of convergent evolution.

In an article published in 2019, Romain Weppe et al. conducted a phylogenetic analysis on the Cainotherioidea within the Artiodactyla based on mandibular and dental characteristics, specifically in terms of relationships with artiodactyls of the Palaeogene. The results retrieved that the superfamily was closely related to the Mixtotheriidae and Anoplotheriidae. They determined that the Cainotheriidae, Robiacinidae, Anoplotheriidae, and Mixtotheriidae formed a clade that was the sister group to the Ruminantia while Tylopoda, along with the Amphimerycidae and Xiphodontidae split earlier in the tree. The phylogenetic tree published in the article and another work about the cainotherioids is outlined below:

- - Eurodexis russelli
  - Dichobune leporina
  - - - Amphimeryx murinus
      - - Xiphodon castrense
        - Tylopoda
          - Paratoceras coatesi
          - Eotylopus reedi
    - - Ruminantia
        - Parvitragulus priscus
        - - Lophiomeryx chalaniati
          - Archaeomeryx optatus
      - - Mixtotheriidae
          Mixtotherium cuspidatum
        - Anoplotheriidae
          - Anoplotherium latipes
          - Dacrytherium ovinum
        - Cainotherioidea
          - Robiacinidae
            - Robiacina lavergnesis
            - - Robiacina minuta
              - Robiacina quercyi
          - Cainotheriidae
            - Palembertina deplasi
            - - Oxacroninae
                - Paroxacron bergeri
                - - Paroxacron valdense
                  - Oxacron courtoisii
              - Cainotheriinae
                - Cainotherium laticurvatum
                - - Caenomeryx
                    - Caenomeryx filholi
                    - Caenomeryx procommunis
                  - Plesiomeryx
                    - Plesiomeryx cadurcensis
                    - Plesiomeryx huerzeleri

In 2020, Vincent Luccisano et al. created a phylogenetic tree of the basal artiodactyls, a majority endemic to western Europe, from the Palaeogene. In one clade, the "bunoselenodont endemic European" Mixtotheriidae, Anoplotheriidae, Xiphodontidae, Amphimerycidae, Cainotheriidae, and Robiacinidae are grouped together with the Ruminantia. The phylogenetic tree as produced by the authors is shown below:

- Artiodactyla
  - Bunophorus
  - - Gunophorus
    - Diacodexis
  - - - Protodichobune
      - Eurodexis
    - - - Buxobune
        - - Mouillacitherium
          - Meniscodon
        - - - Hyperdichobune
            - - Dichobune robertiana
              - - Dichobune leporina
                - - Homacodon
                  - - Gobiohyus
                    - Suina
                      - - Khirtharia
                        - Entelodon
                      - - Palaeocheorus
                        - Perchoerus
          - - Haplobunodontidae
              - Haplobunodon
              - - Cuisitherium
                - Lophiobunodon
            - - Mixtotherium
              - - Robiacina
                - - - - Dacrytherium
                      - Diplobune
                    - - Xiphodon
                      - Paraxiphodon
                  - - - Cainotherium
                      - Paroxacron
                    - - Archaeomeryx
                      - - Amphimeryx
                        - Pseudamphimeryx
      - - Aumelasia
        - - - Hallebune
            - Amphirhagatherium
          - - Cebochoeridae
              - Cebochoerus
              - Gervachoerus
            - - Choeropotamus
              - Siamotherium

== Description ==
The Xiphodontidae is characterized in part by the elongated premolars (P/p), molariform P^{4} teeth, upper molars (M/m) with 4 to 5 crescent-shaped cusps, and selenodont (crescent-shaped ridges) lower molars with 4 ridges, compressed lingual cuspids, and crescent-shaped labial cuspids. Paraxiphodon is a medium-sized artiodactyl in comparison to its contemporary relatives, being close in size to Xiphodon gracile, the largest species within the genus. The premolars are elongated, although the first lower premolar, P_{1}, only has one root, is greatly reduced, and is separated from P_{2} by a diastema. The outlying cusps ("styles") of the molars appear to be bulbous and prominent, the mesostyle having a looplike and symmetric form. The upper molars are transversely reduced and appear to have selenodonty in comparison to Xiphodon. The molars of Paraxiphodon differ little from Xiphodon while the premolars of the two genera can be more easily distinguished.

== Palaeoecology ==
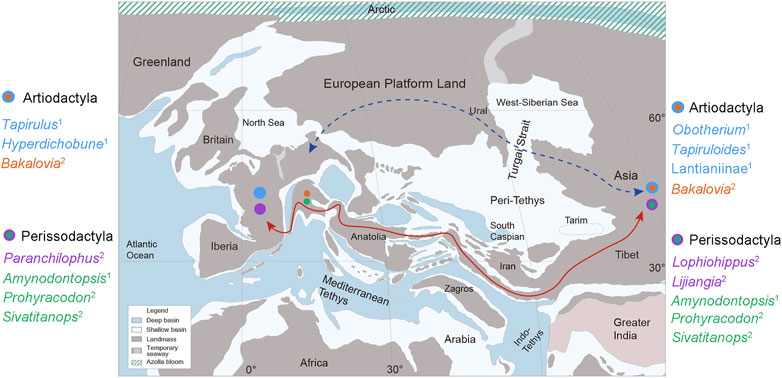
Palaeogeography of Europe and Asia during the Middle Eocene with possible artiodactyl and perissodactyl dispersal routes.

For much of the Eocene, a hothouse climate with humid, tropical environments with consistently high precipitations prevailed. Modern mammalian orders including the Perissodactyla, Artiodactyla, and Primates (or the suborder Euprimates) appeared already by the Early Eocene, diversifying rapidly and developing dentitions specialized for folivory. The omnivorous forms mostly either switched to folivorous diets or went extinct by the Middle Eocene (47–37 million years ago) along with the archaic "condylarths". By the Late Eocene (approx. 37–33 mya), most of the ungulate form dentitions shifted from bunodont (or rounded) cusps to cutting ridges (i.e. lophs) for folivorous diets.

Land connections between western Europe and North America were interrupted around 53 Ma. From the Early Eocene up until the Grande Coupure extinction event (56–33.9 mya), western Eurasia was separated into three landmasses: western Europe (an archipelago), Balkanatolia (in-between the Paratethys Sea of the north and the Neotethys Ocean of the south), and eastern Eurasia. The Holarctic mammalian faunas of western Europe were therefore mostly isolated from other landmasses including Greenland, Africa, and eastern Eurasia, allowing for endemism to develop. Therefore, the European mammals of the Late Eocene (MP17–MP20 of the Mammal Palaeogene zones) were mostly descendants of endemic middle Eocene groups.

Paraxiphodon is exclusively known from MP17a given its exclusivity within Fons deposits. It coexisted with a wide variety of artiodactyl families ranging from the more widespread Dichobunidae and Tapirulidae to many other endemic families consisting of the Anoplotheriidae, Mixtotheriidae, Choeropotamidae, Cebochoeridae, Amphimerycidae, and Cainotheriidae. It also coexisted with the Palaeotheriidae, the remaining perissodactyl family of western Europe. Late Eocene European groups of the clade Ferae represented predominantly the Hyaenodonta (Hyaenodontinae, Hyainailourinae, and Proviverrinae) but also contained Carnivoramorpha (Miacidae).< Other mammal groups present in the Late Eocene of western Europe represented the leptictidans (Pseudorhyncocyonidae), primates (Adapoidea and Omomyoidea), eulipotyphlans (Nyctitheriidae), chiropterans, herpetotheriids, apatotherians, and endemic rodents (Pseudosciuridae, Theridomyidae, and Gliridae). The alligatoroid Diplocynodon, present only in Europe since the upper Paleocene, coexisted with pre-Grande Coupure faunas as well. In addition to snakes, frogs, and salamandrids, rich assemblage of lizards are known in western Europe as well from MP16-MP20, representing the Iguanidae, Lacertidae, Gekkonidae, Agamidae, Scincidae, Helodermatidae, and Varanoidea.

Within the MP17a locality of Fons 4, Paraxiphodon is known to have coexisted with the likes of the herpetotheriids Amphiperatherium and Peratherium, glirid Glamys, theridomyid Elfomys, omomyid Necrolemur, hyaenodont Hyaenodon, palaeotheres (Anchilophus, Lophiotherium, Pachynolophus, Plagiolophus, Palaeotherium), dichobunid Mouillacitherium, cebochoerid Cebochoerus, choeropotamid Choeropotamus, anoplotheriid Dacrytherium, and other xiphodonts (Xiphodon, Dichodon, Haplomeryx).
