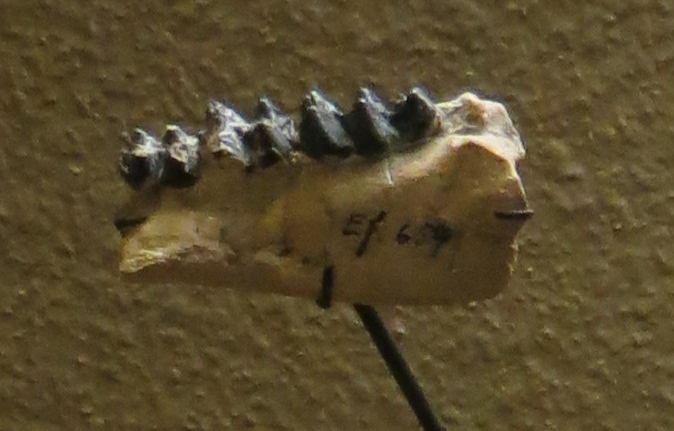
- Catodontherium fallax jaw fragment, Natural History Museum of Basel

Scientific classification
- Kingdom: Animalia
- Phylum: Chordata
- Class: Mammalia
- Order: Artiodactyla
- Family: †Anoplotheriidae
- Subfamily: †Dacrytheriinae
- Genus: †Catodontherium; Depéret, 1908

Type species
- †Catodus robiacensis (= †Catodontherium robiacense) Depéret, 1906

Other species
- †C. fallax Stehlin, 1910; †C. buxgovianum Stehlin, 1910; †C. paquieri? Stehlin, 1910; †C. argentonicum? Stehlin, 1910

Synonyms
- Genus synonymy: Catodus Depéret, 1906; Synonyms of C. robiacense: Catodus robiacensis Depéret, 1908; Synonyms of C. fallax: Catodus Rutimeyeri Depéret, 1908

= Catodontherium =

Catodontherium Temporal range: Middle Eocene 43.5–37.8 Ma (Possible earliest record of up to ~47.8 Ma)

Extinct genus of Palaeogene artiodactyls

Catodontherium is an extinct genus of artiodactyl belonging to the family Anoplotheriidae. It was endemic to Western Europe during the Palaeogene era and had a temporal range exclusive to the middle Eocene, although its earliest appearance depends on whether C. argentonicum is truly a species of Catodontherium. It was first named Catodus by the French palaeontologist Charles Depéret in 1906, who created two species for the genus and later changed the genus name to Catodontherium in 1908. The Swiss palaeontologist Hans Georg Stehlin renamed one species and classified two other newly erected species to Catodontherium in 1910. Today, there are four known species, although two remain questionable in genus placement.

Similar to the other dacrytheriine Dacrytherium and unlike anoplotheriines such as Anoplotherium, Catodontherium had a preorbital fossa. It also had cranial and dental morphologies typical of the Dacrytheriinae but had specific differences from Dacrytherium such as the position of the infraorbital foramen and forms of the premolars and molars. The anoplotheriid is known by very few facial and limb remains, most of which are fragmentary.

Typical of anoplotheriids, Catodontherium lived in Western Europe back when it was an archipelago that was isolated from the rest of Eurasia, meaning that it lived in subtropical-tropical environments with various other faunal assembagess that also evolved with high levels of endemism.

== Taxonomy ==
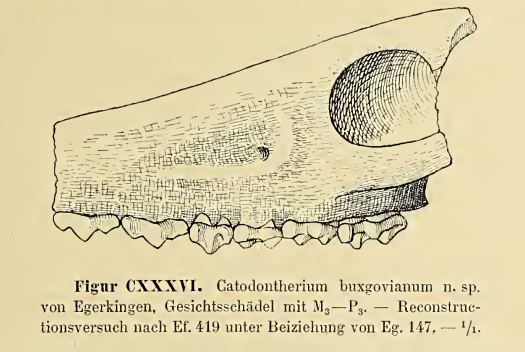
Illustrated reconstruction of a partial facial skull of Catodontherium buxgovianum, 1910

In 1906, the French palaeontologist Charles Depéret wrote about fauna groups classified as being of the Bartonian stage of the middle Eocene. According to him, the localities of Robiac in France and Mormont in Switzerland have abundant fossil remains of anthracotheres with molars lower in shape than those of the Oligocene-aged Brachyodus. He said that specimens were previously designated by François Jules Pictet de la Rive under the species name "Hyopotamus gresslyi" (previously named by Ludwig Rütimeyer in 1862) but that he could not reuse the species name because Christian Erich Hermann von Meyer applied it previously to a lost molar holotype in the form of the now-invalid species name "Tapinodon gresslyi" in 1846. Since he determined that it did not belong to "Hyopotamus" (= Bothriodon), he decided to erect the genus name Catodus and create the species Catodus robiacensis, thinking that it may have been within the ancestral lineage of Brachyodus. He also said that Rütimeyer designated fossils of another species to Hyopotamus gresslyi, replacing it with another species name Catodus Rutimeyeri.

In 1908, Depéret replaced the previous genus name Catodus with the newer genus name Catodontherium but reinforced the validity of its two species. He stated that it was oldest of the Brachyodus branch, C. Rutimeyeri being the oldest known species. According to the American palaeontologist George Gaylord Simpson in 1945, the genus was renamed because of apparent preoccupation of a prior genus name Catodon. He stated that the genus name was not a preoccupation but that it was a nomen nudum anyways, meaning that Catodontherium could be retained.

"Hyopotamus gresslyi" was taxonomically problematic since fossils of other artiodactyls like Catodontherium and later Dacrytherium were historically assigned to it. Swiss palaeontologist Hans Georg Stehlin previously synonymized Tapinodon gresslyi and Hyopotamus gresslyi with the newly erected species Haplobunodon lydekkeri (replacing Haplobunodon picteti) in 1908. In 1910, Stehlin validated Catodontherium because its dentition differed from typical Oligocene anthracotheres by its extreme brachydonty (low crowns) and elongated premolars. He stated that the brachydonty was more extreme compared to Dacrytherium and Leptotheridium and argued that while the species name Dichodon valdense could replace C. robiacense, the former may not have been valid compared to the latter. He also created another species C. fallax and said that the other name C. rutimeyeri should be synonymized with it because it was diagnosed only on isolated teeth. He also established three additional species named C. buxgovianum, C(?) paquieri, and C(?) argentonicum based on other remains.

C. robiacense and C. buxgovianum have since been defined as valid species belonging to Catodontherium while C. paquieri? and C. argentonicum? remain uncertain in genus placement. The genus is described as being not as well-known compared to Dacrytherium.

=== Classification ===
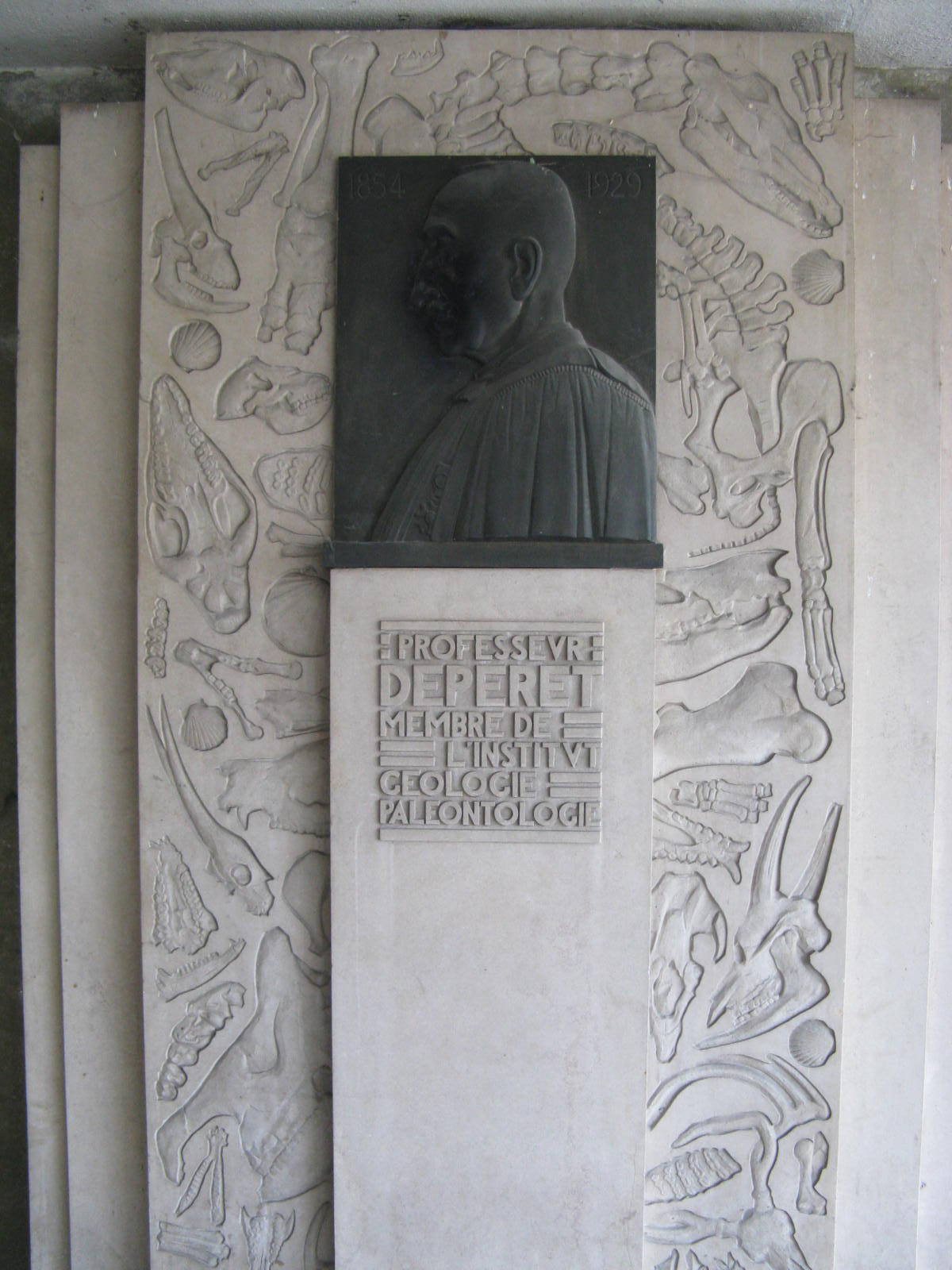
Carving of Charles Depéret, who erected the genus Catodontherium

Catodontherium belongs to the subfamily Dacrytheriinae, which belongs to the Palaeogene artiodactyl family Anoplotheriidae. The family was endemic to Western Europe and lived from the middle Eocene to the early Oligocene (~44 to 30 Ma, possible earliest record at ~48 Ma). The exact evolutionary origins and dispersals of the anoplotheriids are uncertain, but they exclusively resided within the continent when it was an archipelago that was isolated by seaway barriers from other regions such as Balkanatolia and the rest of eastern Eurasia. The Anoplotheriidae's relations with other members of the Artiodactyla are not well-resolved, with some determining it to be either a tylopod (which includes camelids and merycoidodonts of the Palaeogene) or a close relative to the infraorder and some others believing that it may have been closer to the Ruminantia (which includes tragulids and other close Palaeogene relatives).

The history of dacrytheriines has been contentious as a result of disagreements as to whether they constitute a subfamily of the Anoplotheriidae or a distinct family named "Dacrytheriidae". The family name was first proposed by Charles Depéret in 1917 and was generally followed for decades by other palaeontologists like Jean Sudre. Since 2007, however, they were redefined as a subfamily within the Anoplotheriidae, supported by recent phylogenetic analyses determining that Dacrytherium falls within the Anoplotheriidae. It is one of two subfamilies of the Anoplotheriidae, the other being the Anoplotheriinae.

The Dacrytheriinae is the older anoplotheriid subfamily, but the actual first appearance by Mammal Palaeogene range is uncertain. The first undisputed appearance of anoplotheriids is by MP13, but their range may have extended, in the case of Catodontherium, into MP11 or even MP10. Dacrytherium itself made its first undisputed appearance by MP13 as an artiodactyl leaning towards bunoselenodont (bunodont (rounded cusps) plus selenodont (crescent-shaped ridge form)) dentition. The younger subfamily Anoplotheriinae made their first appearances by the late Eocene (MP15-MP16), or ~41-40 Ma, within Western Europe with Duerotherium and Robiatherium. After a significant gap of anoplotheriines in MP17a-MP17b, the derived anoplotheriids Anoplotherium and Diplobune made their first appearances in Western Europe by MP18, although their exact origins are unknown. In 2022 it was suggested that Dacrytheriinae is a paraphyletic subfamily based on dental morphology from which the Anoplotheriinae stemmed, but further research is required to confirm if this is true.

Conducting studies focused on the phylogenetic relations within the Anoplotheriidae has proven difficult due to the general scarcity of fossils for most of the species. The phylogenetic relations of the Anoplotheriidae as well as the Xiphodontidae, Mixtotheriidae, and Cainotheriidae have also been elusive due to the selenodont morphologies of the molars, which were convergent with tylopods or ruminants. Some researchers considered the selenodont families Anoplotheriidae, Xiphodontidae, and Cainotheriidae to be within Tylopoda due to postcranial features that were similar to the tylopods from North America in the Palaeogene. Other researchers tie them as being more closely related to ruminants than tylopods based on dental morphology. Different phylogenetic analyses have produced different results for the "derived" selenodont Eocene European artiodactyl families, making it uncertain whether they were closer to the Tylopoda or Ruminantia.

In an article published in 2019, Romain Weppe et al. conducted a phylogenetic analysis on the Cainotherioidea within the Artiodactyla based on mandibular and dental characteristics, specifically in terms of relationships with artiodactyls of the Palaeogene. The results retrieved that the superfamily was closely related to the Mixtotheriidae and Anoplotheriidae. They determined that the Cainotheriidae, Robiacinidae, Anoplotheriidae (represented below by Anoplotherium and Dacrytherium), and Mixtotheriidae formed a clade that was the sister group to the Ruminantia while Tylopoda, along with the Amphimerycidae and Xiphodontidae split earlier in the tree. The phylogenetic tree published in the article and another work about the cainotherioids is outlined below:

- - Eurodexis russelli
  - Dichobune leporina
  - - - Amphimeryx murinus
      - - Xiphodon castrense
        - Tylopoda
          - Paratoceras coatesi
          - Eotylopus reedi
    - - Ruminantia
        - Parvitragulus priscus
        - - Lophiomeryx chalaniati
          - Archaeomeryx optatus
      - - Mixtotheriidae
          Mixtotherium cuspidatum
        - Anoplotheriidae
          - Anoplotherium latipes
          - Dacrytherium ovinum
        - Cainotherioidea
          - Robiacinidae
            - Robiacina lavergnesis
            - - Robiacina minuta
              - Robiacina quercyi
          - Cainotheriidae
            - Palembertina deplasi
            - - Oxacroninae
                - Paroxacron bergeri
                - - Paroxacron valdense
                  - Oxacron courtoisii
              - Cainotheriinae
                - Cainotherium laticurvatum
                - - Caenomeryx
                    - Caenomeryx filholi
                    - Caenomeryx procommunis
                  - Plesiomeryx
                    - Plesiomeryx cadurcensis
                    - Plesiomeryx huerzeleri

In 2022, Weppe created a phylogenetic analysis in his academic thesis regarding Palaeogene artiodactyl lineages, focusing most specifically on the endemic European families. The phylogenetic tree, according to Weppe, is the first to conduct phylogenetic affinities of all anoplotheriid genera, although not all individual species were included. He found that the Anoplotheriidae, Mixtotheriidae, and Cainotherioidea form a clade based on synapomorphic dental traits (traits thought to have originated from their most recent common ancestor). The result, Weppe mentioned, matches up with previous phylogenetic analyses on the Cainotherioidea with other endemic European Palaeogene artiodactyls that support the families as a clade. As a result, he argued that the proposed superfamily Anoplotherioidea, composed of the Anoplotheriidae and Xiphodontidae as proposed by Alan W. Gentry and Hooker in 1988, is invalid due to the polyphyly of the lineages in the phylogenetic analysis. However, the Xiphodontidae was still found to compose part of a wider clade with the three other groups. He also proposed that Leptotheridium, previously relocated from the "Dacrytheriidae" to the Xiphodontidae, composes part of a paraphyletic anoplotheriid clade with the dacrytheriines Catodontherium and Dacrytherium.

== Description ==
=== Skull ===
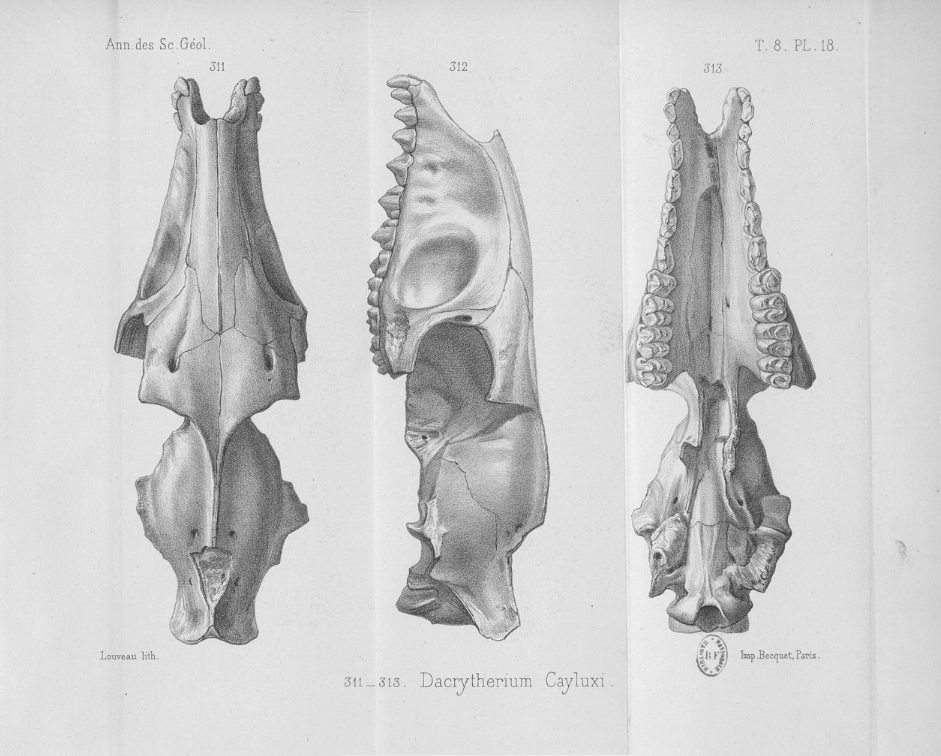
Illustrated upper skull of the closely related Dacrytherium ovinum, 1877

The dacrytheriines share the presences of preorbital fossae, distinguishing them cranially from anoplotheriines. C. buxgovianum is known by a preorbital fossa similar to Dacrytherium, but its development is less marked. C. buxgovianum and C. fallax are known by fragmentary cranial fossil remains, described by Stehlin in 1910 and stored currently at the Natural History Museum of Basel. The compressed skull fragment specimen Ef.419, belonging to C. buxgovianum, is a back portion of the facial skull with the moderate-sized right orbit located slightly above the edge of the alveolar process. The infraorbital foramen is somewhat distant from the front of the orbit, is above the M^{1} tooth, and differs in position to that of Dacrytherium. Stehlin speculated that the top view of the skull of Catodontherium may have been similar in appearance to that of Dacrytherium. C. fallax, known by three skull fragments, has a similar texture to that observed in C. buxgovianum. Its infraorbital foramen is above the border of M^{2} and M^{1}, a depression occurring at the middle position of where M^{2} is.

The horizontal ramus of the mandible of C. buxgovianum is large and has less of a proportion increase in the back area compared to that of Dacrytherium ovinum.

=== Dentition ===
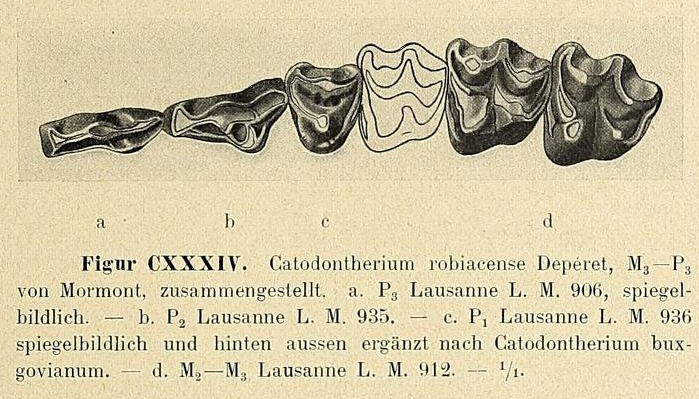
C. robiacense lower dentition, drawn in 1910 (M_{1} missing)

The dental formula of Catodontherium and other anoplotheriids is 3.1.4.33.1.4.3 for a total of 44 teeth, consistent with the primitive dental formula for early-middle Palaeogene placental mammals. Anoplotheriids have selenodont (crescent-shaped ridge form) or bunoselenodont (bunodont and selenodont) premolars (P/p) and molars (M/m) made for leaf-browsing diets. The canines (C/c) of the Anoplotheriidae are overall undifferentiated from the incisors (I/i). The lower premolars of the family are piercing and elongated. The upper molars are bunoselenodont in form while the lower molars have selenodont labial cuspids and bunodont (or rounded) lingual cuspids. The subfamily Anoplotheriinae differs from the Dacrytheriinae by the lack of both molariform upper premolars with crescent-shaped paraconules and the lower molars with a third cusp between the metaconid and entoconid.

Catodontherium is diagnosed as having more elongated lower premolars, except for the P_{4}, compared to Dacrytherium and lower molars without the side mediostylid cusp that Dacrytherium has. The third lobe (or division) of the M_{3} has a double-cusped formation. The upper molars are trapezoidal in outline, with the labial sides of their paracone and metacone cusps being slightly ridged. The molars are very brachydont while the last two back premolars are sharp. The molars of C. argentonicum? are seemingly more bunodont compared to other species of Catodontherium and Dacrytherium.

=== Limbs ===
Catodontherium is known by very few postcranial remains, leading Hooker to state in 2007 that the genus lacks any astragalus fossil designated to it. Alternatively in 1947, Jean Viret and J. Prudant described proximal ends of the radii bones that had typical anoplotheriid morphologies that correspond to unusual forelimb movement compared to other artiodactyls. They designated one proximal radius end to C. robiacense on the basis that it was transversely enlarged and was primitive in appearance compared to that of Dacrytherium because it was not as differentiated anatomically. They also said the astragalus of Catodontherium has similar sizes and proportions to that of "Brachyodus borbonicus" (= Elomeryx borbonicus) but differs by a projection on its external face near a facet joint for the calcaneum. According to Jean Sudre in 1969, C. robiacense has tridactyl (three-toed) hind legs, citing from a 1948 source by A. Favre that there is no trace of the 1st and 5th metatarsals.

== Palaeoecology ==
=== Middle Eocene ===
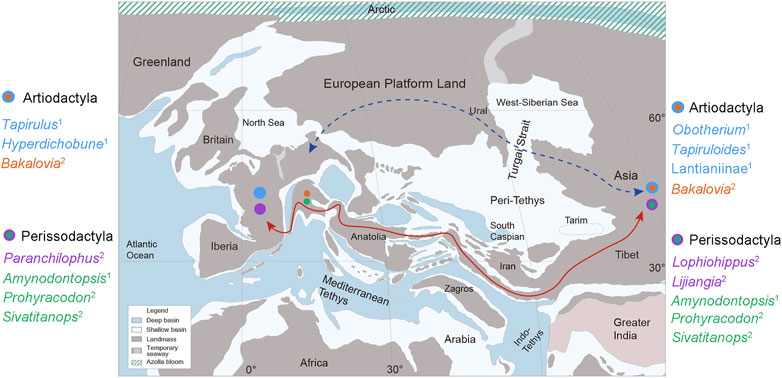
Palaeogeography of Europe and Asia during the middle Eocene with possible artiodactyl and perissodactyl dispersal routes.

For much of the Eocene, a hothouse climate with humid, tropical environments with consistently high precipitations prevailed. Modern mammalian orders including the Perissodactyla, Artiodactyla, and Primates (or the suborder Euprimates) appeared already by the early Eocene, diversifying rapidly and developing dentitions specialized for folivory. The omnivorous forms mostly either switched to folivorous diets or went extinct by the middle Eocene (47 – 37 Ma) along with the archaic "condylarths". By the late Eocene (approx. 37 – 33 Ma), most of the ungulate form dentitions shifted from bunodont cusps to cutting ridges (i.e. lophs) for folivorous diets.

Land-based connections to the north of the developing Atlantic Ocean were interrupted around 53 Ma, meaning that North America and Greenland were no longer well-connected to Western Europe. From the early Eocene up until the Grande Coupure extinction event (56 Ma – 33.9 Ma), the western Eurasian continent was separated into three landmasses, the former two of which were isolated by seaways: Western Europe (an archipelago), Balkanatolia, and eastern Eurasia (Balkanatolia was in between the Paratethys Sea of the north and the Neotethys Ocean of the south). The Holarctic mammalian faunas of Western Europe were therefore mostly isolated from all other regions, allowing for endemism to occur within Western Europe. The European mammals of the late Eocene (MP17 – MP20) were mostly descendants of endemic middle Eocene groups as a result.

C. argentonicum? was present in Western Europe by MP11 based on fossil presence at the locality of Argenton in France. In terms of undisputed species, C. buxgovianum and C. fallax both made an appearance in the continent by MP14 based on their presence at the locality of Egerkingen, Switzerland. By MP14, Catodontherium would have coexisted with perissodactyls (Palaeotheriidae, Lophiodontidae, and Hyrachyidae), non-endemic artiodactyls (Dichobunidae and Tapirulidae), endemic European artiodactyls (Choeropotamidae, Cebochoeridae, Mixtotheriidae, Amphimerycidae, Xiphodontidae, and other members of Anoplotheriidae), and primates (Adapidae). The stratigraphic ranges of Catodontherium also overlapped with metatherians (Herpetotheriidae), cimolestans (Pantolestidae, Paroxyclaenidae), rodents (Ischyromyidae, Theridomyoidea, Gliridae), eulipotyphlans, bats, apatotherians, carnivoraformes (Miacidae), and hyaenodonts (Hyainailourinae, Proviverrinae). Other MP13-MP14 sites have also yielded fossils of turtles and crocodylomorphs. Catodontherium made its latest known appearance by MP16 as the species C. robiacense as indicated by the French locality of Robiac, still having coexisted with largely similar faunas.
