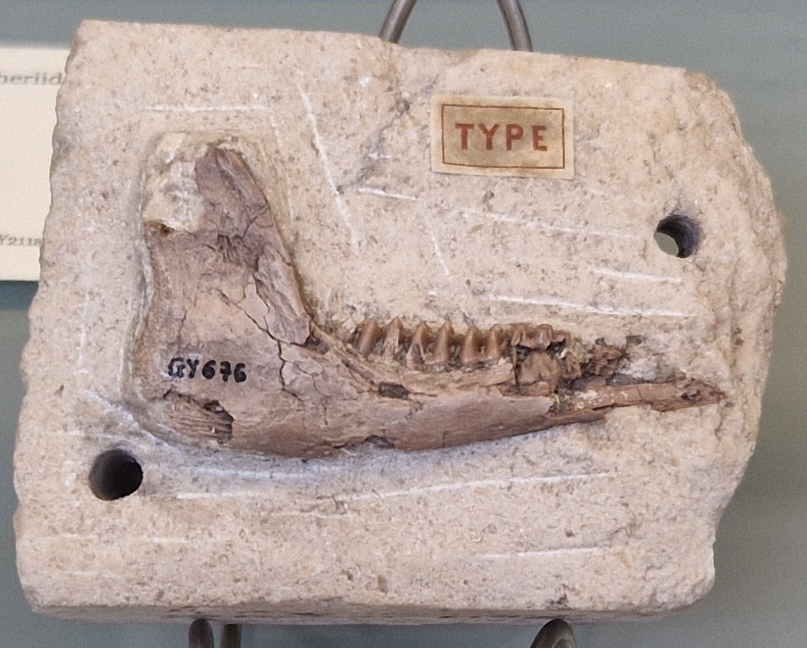
- Amphimeryx murinus mandible, National Museum of Natural History, France
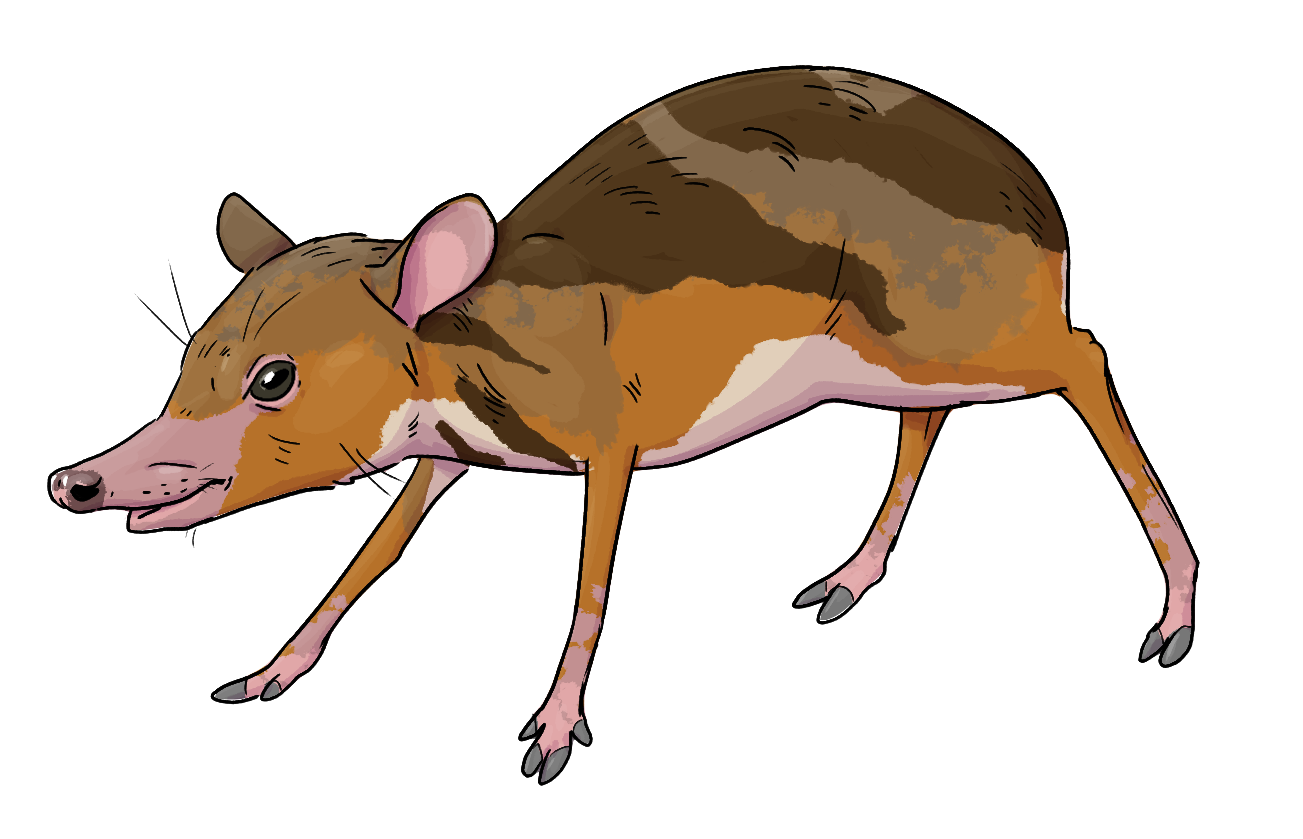
- Restoration of A. murinus based on known fossil material

Scientific classification
- Kingdom: Animalia
- Phylum: Chordata
- Class: Mammalia
- Infraclass: Placentalia
- Order: Artiodactyla
- Family: †Amphimerycidae; Stehlin, 1910

Type genus
- Amphimeryx Pomel, 1848

Genera
- Amphimeryx; Pseudamphimeryx

= Amphimerycidae =

Amphimerycidae Temporal range: Middle Eocene - Early Oligocene 43.5–32.5 Ma

Extinct family of artiodactyls

Amphimerycidae is an extinct family of artiodactyls that was endemic to western Europe and lived from the Middle Eocene to the Early Oligocene. With a taxonomic history extending as far back as 1804, the family was formally recognized by the Swiss palaeontologist Hans Georg Stehlin in 1910 and contains two genera: Amphimeryx and Pseudamphimeryx. Species belonging to the Amphimerycidae ranged from 0.4 kg (0.88 lb) to 1.5 kg (3.3 lb), making them among the smallest artiodactyls to have existed. Both amphimerycid genera are very similar to each other in terms of skull and dental anatomy but do have specific differences from each other. Both genera are best known from their fused cuboid bone and navicular bone, which together make up a single "cubonavicular bone" of the hind legs. This trait had long been used in support of the idea that they were ruminants by taxonomists. However, their classification to the Ruminantia had also been rejected by other taxonomists later on due to differences in dentition; the systematic position of the Amphimerycidae and close relatives in relation to the wider Artiodactyla (or Cetartiodactyla), as a result, is unclear.

The Amphimerycidae lived in western Europe, which at the time was an archipelago that was isolated from the rest of Eurasia. This meant that it lived in a tropical-subtropical environment with various other faunas that also evolved with strong levels of endemism. Pseudamphimeryx was the first-occurring genus but then was replaced by Amphimeryx in the Late Eocene. Amphimeryx lived up to the Early Oligocene, having apparently briefly survived after the Grande Coupure turnover event.

== Taxonomy ==
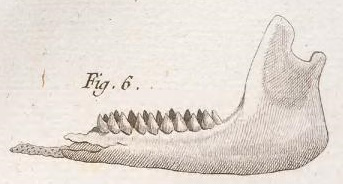
Drawing of a mandible of "Anoplotherium murinum" (= Amphimeryx murinus), 1822)

The earliest taxonomic history of the Amphimerycidae was in 1804 when the French naturalist Georges Cuvier erected Anoplotherium minimum, stating that unlike with other species assigned to Anoplotherium (A. commune, A. medium, and A. minus), A. minimum lacked known postcranial fossil evidence. In 1822, he emended A. minimum to A. murinum, noting that the species was still only known from its skull unlike with other Anoplotherium species, and classified it to the subgenus Dichobune. (Note: A. minus was emended to A. leporinum by Cuvier the same year and has later been considered a species of Dichobune as a distinct genus.) In 1848, the French palaeontologist Auguste Pomel erected the genus Amphimeryx for the reclassified species A. murinus, arguing that it was close to ruminants in affinity.

In a 1891–1893 palaeontology textbook, the German palaeontologist Karl Alfred von Zittel classified Amphimeryx to the artiodactyl family Xiphodontidae. Swiss palaeontologist Hans Georg Stehlin reclassified it and the newly recognized Pseudamphimeryx to their own family, the Amphimerycidae, in 1910. He also noted that while Amphimeryx was long thought to have been closely related to Xiphodon, the possibility that both the Amphimerycidae and Xiphodon independently acquired similar anatomical traits couldn't be eliminated. In 1961, The French palaeontologist Jean Viret provided a formal diagnosis of the Amphimerycidae, describing the anatomical traits that separated the family from its relatives.

=== Classification ===
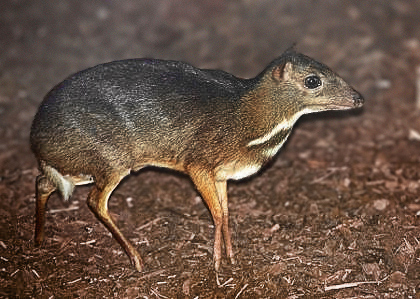
Because of some similar anatomical traits of the amphimerycids to those of ruminants (like the Java mouse-deer (Tragulus javanicus), pictured), they were previously considered ruminants by biologists. Today, their evolutionary relationship to ruminants and other artiodactyls proves unclear.

For much of the taxonomy history of the amphimerycids, their placements within or outside the Ruminantia had been disputed and still remains so today. In 1941, the American palaeontologist Edwin H. Colbert wrote about evolutionary affinities of fossil and extant ruminants, comparing Archaeomeryx to other artiodactyl genera like Amphimeryx, Hypertragulus, Gelocus, and Tragulus. He said that fossil evidence of Amphimeryx was not complete during his time of study but suggested that it may have been a primitive member of clade Tragulina but that Archaeomeryx was overall more primitive than it. He then classified Amphimeryx to its own ruminant superfamily Amphimerycoidea, separating it from other traguline superfamilies like the Hypertraguloidea and Traguloidea. His classification was followed by another American palaeontologist George Gaylord Simpson in 1945.

In 1961, Viret reclassified the Amphimerycidae and the Xiphodontidae into the artiodactyl clade Ancodonta, therefore removing the former from the Ruminantia. Similarly, American palaeontologists S. David Webb and Beryl E. Taylor in 1980 argued that the Amphimerycidae had historically been tied to the Ruminantia due to postcranial convergences but otherwise had more in common with xiphodonts than ruminants in terms of dentition. However, they chose to tentatively reclassify the Xiphodontidae and Amphimerycidae to the Tylopoda instead, although they did also suggest the possibility of them being a sister group to ruminants. On the other hand, in 1997, the American palaeontologists Malcolm McKenna and Susan K. Bell reclassified the Amphimerycidae into the Ruminantia.

According to Jörg Erfurt and Grégoire Métais in 2007, the similarities of amphimerycids with ruminants may be an instance of parallel evolution, in which amphimerycids and ruminants independently gained similar traits. While amphimerycids have typically been excluded from the Ruminantia due to their dental characteristics, it does not eliminate the possibility of them being the sister taxa to ruminants by the latter independently gaining longer legs and more selenodont (crescent-shaped) dentition. Its affinities, along with those of other endemic European artiodactyls, are unclear; the Amphimerycidae, Anoplotheriidae, Xiphodontidae, Mixtotheriidae, and Cainotheriidae have been determined to be close to either tylopods (i.e. camelids and merycoidodonts) or ruminants. Different phylogenetic analyses have produced different results for the "derived" selenodont Eocene European artiodactyl families, making it uncertain whether they were closer to the Tylopoda or Ruminantia.

In an article published in 2019, Romain Weppe et al. conducted a phylogenetic analysis on the Cainotherioidea within the Artiodactyla based on mandibular and dental characteristics, specifically in terms of relationships with artiodactyls of the Palaeogene. The results retrieved that the superfamily was closely related to the Mixtotheriidae and Anoplotheriidae. They determined that the Cainotheriidae, Robiacinidae, Anoplotheriidae, and Mixtotheriidae formed a clade that was the sister group to the Ruminantia while Tylopoda, along with the Amphimerycidae and Xiphodontidae split earlier in the tree. The phylogenetic tree used for the journal and another published work about the cainotherioids is outlined below:

- - Eurodexis russelli
  - Dichobune leporina
  - - - Amphimeryx murinus
      - - Xiphodon castrense
        - Tylopoda
          - Paratoceras coatesi
          - Eotylopus reedi
    - - Ruminantia
        - Parvitragulus priscus
        - - Lophiomeryx chalaniati
          - Archaeomeryx optatus
      - - Mixtotheriidae
          Mixtotherium cuspidatum
        - Anoplotheriidae
          - Anoplotherium latipes
          - Dacrytherium ovinum
        - Cainotherioidea
          - Robiacinidae
            - Robiacina lavergnesis
            - - Robiacina minuta
              - Robiacina quercyi
          - Cainotheriidae
            - Palembertina deplasi
            - - Oxacroninae
                - Paroxacron bergeri
                - - Paroxacron valdense
                  - Oxacron courtoisii
              - Cainotheriinae
                - Cainotherium laticurvatum
                - - Caenomeryx
                    - Caenomeryx filholi
                    - Caenomeryx procommunis
                  - Plesiomeryx
                    - Plesiomeryx cadurcensis
                    - Plesiomeryx huerzeleri

In 2020, Vincent Luccisano et al. created a phylogenetic tree of the basal artiodactyls, a majority endemic to western Europe, from the Palaeogene. In one clade, the "bunoselenodont endemic European" Mixtotheriidae, Anoplotheriidae, Xiphodontidae, Amphimerycidae, Cainotheriidae, and Robiacinidae are grouped together with the Ruminantia. The phylogenetic tree as produced by the authors is shown below:

- Artiodactyla
  - Bunophorus
  - - Gunophorus
    - Diacodexis
  - - - Protodichobune
      - Eurodexis
    - - - Buxobune
        - - Mouillacitherium
          - Meniscodon
        - - - Hyperdichobune
            - - Dichobune robertiana
              - - Dichobune leporina
                - - Homacodon
                  - - Gobiohyus
                    - Suina
                      - - Khirtharia
                        - Entelodon
                      - - Palaeocheorus
                        - Perchoerus
          - - Haplobunodontidae
              - Haplobunodon
              - - Cuisitherium
                - Lophiobunodon
            - - Mixtotherium
              - - Robiacina
                - - - - Dacrytherium
                      - Diplobune
                    - - Xiphodon
                      - Paraxiphodon
                  - - - Cainotherium
                      - Paroxacron
                    - - Archaeomeryx
                      - - Amphimeryx
                        - Pseudamphimeryx
      - - Aumelasia
        - - - Hallebune
            - Amphirhagatherium
          - - Cebochoeridae
              - Cebochoerus
              - Gervachoerus
            - - Choeropotamus
              - Siamotherium

In 2022, Weppe conducted a phylogenetic analysis of Palaeogene artiodactyls, focusing mostly on the endemic European families. While the clade consisting of P. renevieri and A. murinus was recovered as a sister group to the other endemic artiodactyl clades, the placement of P. schlosseri rendered the Amphimerycidae paraphyletic in relation to the derived amphimerycid species and other families. He argued that the Amphimerycidae thus needs a systemic revision for which P. schlosseri would be assigned to a new genus and removed from the Amphimerycidae.

== Description ==
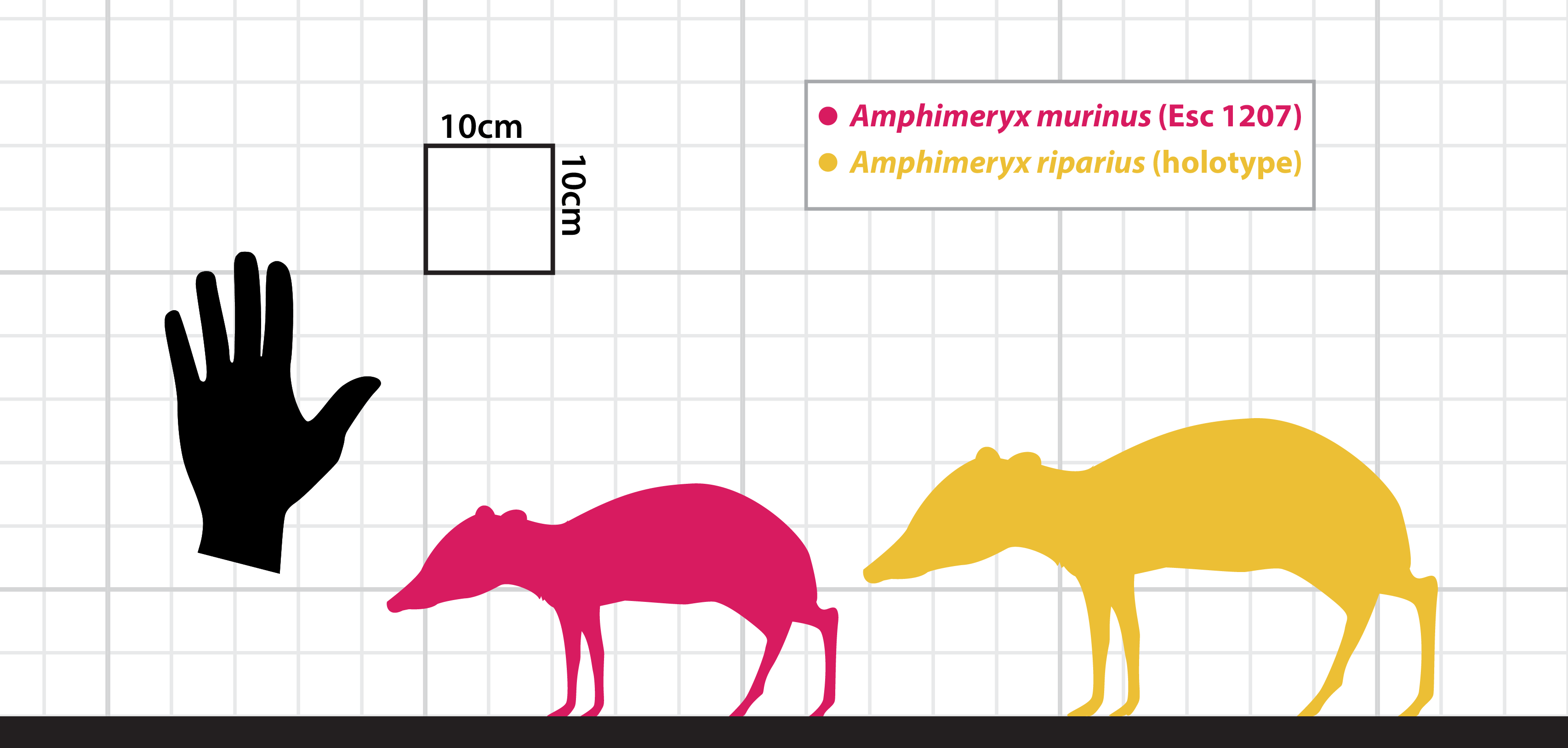
Estimated size comparisons of A. murinus and A. riparius based on known fossil remains

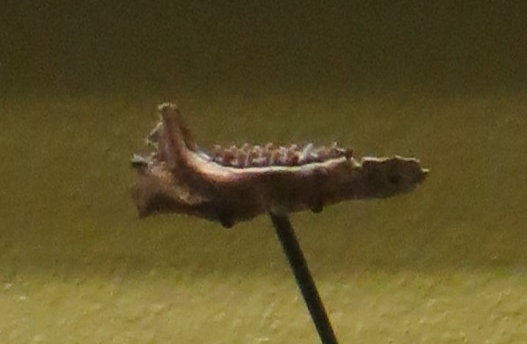
Pseudamphimeryx renevieri mandible, Natural History Museum of Basel

The Amphimerycidae is a family of small-sized artiodactyls whose species ranged in weight from 0.4 kg (0.88 lb) to 1.5 kg (3.3 lb) total. In a 1995 study by Jean-Noël Martinez and Jean Sudre on several Paleogene artiodactyls found that only Messelobunodon is smaller than Amphimeryx. Amphimerycids are defined in part as having an elongated snout and large orbits (eye sockets) that are widened in their backs. The dental formula of the Amphimerycidae is 3.1.4.33.1.4.3 (3 incisors, 1 canine, four premolars and three molars in each half of the upper jaw, and 3 incisors, 1 canines, 4 premolars and 3 molars on each half of the lower jaw) for a total of 44 teeth, consistent with the primitive (ancestral) dental formula for early-middle Palaeogene placental mammals. The incisors (I/i) are shovel-shaped and have sharp edges on their crowns. The canines (C/c) are incisiform (incisor-like in form/shape) and therefore differ little with the incisors themselves. The premolars (P/p) are elongated and may generally be separated by diastemata (gaps between teeth). The lower premolars have three lobes, or developed areas on their crowns. The upper molars (M/m) are more developed in form and are generally subtriangular in shape, although some may be more rectangular. They have five crescent-shaped (selenodont) tubercles and sometimes a partial hypocone cusp that may be present in all species. Amphimerycids differ from ruminants, particularly the basal clade Tragulina, in the retentions of their first premolars and their high levels of specialization in their selenodonty and number of cusps in their molars. Their dentitions more closely resemble those of xiphodonts or dacrytheriines than of ruminants. The overall selenodonty and brachyodonty (low-crowned teeth) of amphimerycids suggest that they were adapted towards folivorous (leaf-eating) dietary habits. Pseudamphimeryx and Amphimeryx, both known by multiple skull specimens, have very similar forms but differ based on a few characteristics. Amphimeryx is distinguished from Pseudamphimeryx in part by the more well-developed occipital crest. While the peak of the skull's top of Amphimeryx slopes down to its front area, that of Pseudamphimeryx appears initially concave at the occipital crest's front, ascends slightly, and then finally slopes down.

Both amphimerycid genera have especially prominent occipital and sagittal crests, the latter of which divides into two less prominent branches behind the fronto-parietal suture (suture overlapping the frontal bone and parietal bone) that extend up to the supraorbital foramen. The frontal bones of both amphimerycid genera are large and flat, being particularly sizeable in their supraorbital portions; this trait is more pronounced in Amphimeryx. The lacrimal bone of both amphimerycids, but especially in Amphimeryx, has an extensive pars facialis (underside of the orbit) and is quadrangular in shape, narrowing at its front. The orbit is large, is positioned near the back of the skull, is wide at its back area, and is more curved at its upper compared to lower edge. The optic foramen, located in the sphenoid bone, extends more forward in Amphimeryx than in Pseudamphimeryx. While the nasal bone is not as well-preserved in Amphimeryx fossils, the frontonasal suture (overlapping with the frontal and nasal bones) is implied to have formed a W shape on the skull's upper surface like that of Pseudamphimeryx. Both amphimerycid genera also have similar, although not identical, medial (or middle) positions of the infraorbital foramen in the maxilla. The palatine bones of Amphimeryx and Pseudamphimeryx are narrower at their front than back ends.

Both amphimerycid genera are best known by the "cubonavicular" bone (fused cuboid bone and navicular bone of the hind legs) recorded in multiple species; the morphology of the astragalus of P. renevieri further attests to anatomical support of the fused bone within the family. This trait has also been recorded in ruminants, suggesting that the amphimerycids and ruminants independently acquired the trait in an instance of parallel evolution. The primitive state of the astragalus sets Amphimeryx apart from ruminants; the approximately equal sizes of its trochleas (grooved pulley-like structure) and more rounded edge of its sustentacular (or supporting) facet also sets the genus apart from the Cainotheriidae. In Amphimeryx, the middle metatarsal digits III and IV are elongated and partially fused to each other while the side digits II and V are greatly reduced to small but needlelike forms. Digit III measures 50 mm (2.0 in) long while digit II is no more than 14 mm (0.55 in) long. These traits are similarly recorded in derived ruminants, which have tetradactyl (four-toed) feet, absent digit I, reduced digits II and V, and fused digits III and IV that make up the cannon bone (the now-extinct primitive ruminants had five-toed feet, unreduced digits II and V, and unfused digits III and IV). Like other artiodactyls with only two elongated digits in each foot (digits III and IV), Amphimeryx was functionally didactyl, meaning that it walked only on its two elongated toes per foot despite having four total.

== Palaeoecology ==
=== Middle Eocene ===
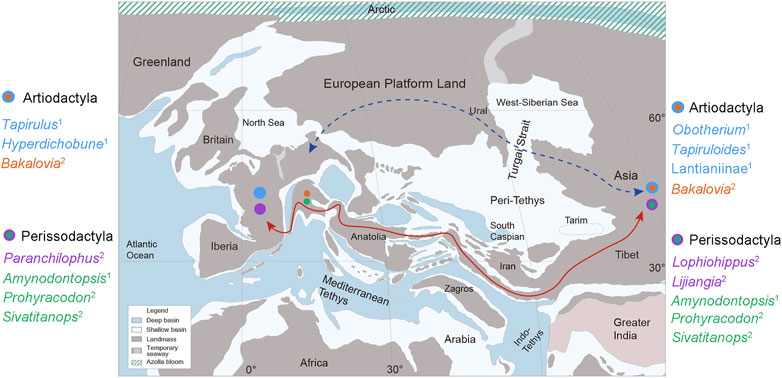
Palaeogeography of Europe and Asia during the Middle Eocene with possible artiodactyl and perissodactyl dispersal routes.

For much of the Eocene, a hothouse climate with humid, tropical environments with consistently high precipitations prevailed. Modern mammalian orders including the Perissodactyla, Artiodactyla, and Primates already evolved by the Early Eocene, diversifying rapidly and developing dentitions specialized for folivory. The omnivorous forms mostly either switched to folivorous diets or went extinct by the Middle Eocene (47–37 Ma) along with the archaic "condylarths". By the Late Eocene (approx. 37–33 mya), most of the ungulate form dentitions shifted from bunodont (or rounded) cusps to cutting ridges (i.e. lophs) for folivorous diets.

Land connections between western Europe and North America were severed around 53 Ma. From the Early Eocene up until the Grande Coupure extinction event (56–33.9 mya), western Eurasia was separated into three landmasses: western Europe (an archipelago), Balkanatolia (in-between the Paratethys Sea of the north and the Neotethys Ocean of the south), and eastern Eurasia. The Holarctic mammals of western Europe were therefore mostly isolated from other landmasses including Greenland, Africa, and eastern Eurasia, allowing for endemism to develop. Therefore, the European mammals of the Late Eocene (MP17–MP20 of the Mammal Palaeogene zones) were mostly descendants of endemic Middle Eocene mammals.

The Amphimerycidae, and by extent the first genus Pseudamphimeryx, is first recorded by the appearance of P. schlosseri in the Swiss locality of Egerkingen α + β, dating back to MP14 (43.5–41.2 mya). Both families would have coexisted with perissodactyls (Palaeotheriidae, Lophiodontidae, and Hyrachyidae), non-endemic artiodactyls (Dichobunidae and Tapirulidae), endemic European artiodactyls (Choeropotamidae, Cebochoeridae, and Anoplotheriidae), and primates (Adapidae). The stratigraphic ranges of the early species of Amphimeryx also overlapped with metatherians (Herpetotheriidae), cimolestans (Pantolestidae, Paroxyclaenidae), rodents (Ischyromyidae, Theridomyoidea, Gliridae), eulipotyphlans, bats, apatotherians, carnivoraformes (Miacidae), and hyaenodonts (Hyainailourinae, Proviverrinae). Other MP13-MP14 (44.9–41.2 mya) sites have also yielded fossils of turtles and crocodylomorphs, and MP13 (44.9–43.5 mya) sites are stratigraphically the latest to have yielded remains of the bird clades Gastornithidae and Palaeognathae. The unit MP16 (40.0–37.8 mya) records the appearances of P. renevieri and P. pavloviae, both of which are recorded from the French locality of Robiac.

After MP16, a faunal turnover occurred, marking the extinctions of the lophiodonts, European hyrachyids, and European crocodylomorphs except forDiplocynodon. The causes of the faunal turnover have been attributed to a shift from humid and highly tropical environments to drier and more temperate forests with open areas and more tough vegetation. The surviving herbivorous faunas shifted their dentitions and dietary strategies accordingly to adapt to the tough and seasonal vegetation. However, the environments were still somewhat subhumid and covered by subtropical evergreen forests. The Palaeotheriidae was the sole remaining European perissodactyl group, and frugivorous-folivorous or purely folivorous artiodactyls became the dominant group in western Europe.

=== Late Eocene and Early Oligocene ===
The Late Eocene unit MP17 (37.8–37.0 mya) records as many as four total species of Pseudamphimeryx: P. renevieri, P. havloviae, P. salesmei, and P. hantonensis. MP17a (37.8–37.5 mya) confirms the continued occurrence of P. renevieri in the French locality of Fons 4; MP17b (37.5–37.0 mya) is the latest unit that Pseudamphimeryx occurs and records both P. renevieri and P. pavloviae from the French locality of Perrière. Starting at MP18 (37.0–35.0 mya), Amphimeryx is found the fossil record. The MP18 locality of La Débruge of France indicates that A. murinus coexisted with a wide variety of mammals such as a wide variety of rodents, palaeotheres, hyaenodonts (Hyaenodon and Pterodon), the dichobunid Dichobune, anoplotheriids (Anoplotherium, Diplobune, Dacrytherium), and the anthracothere Elomeryx.

MP20 (34.0–33.9 mya) marks the last known appearance of A. murinus, but the species A. riparius is apparently recorded solely from the MP21 (33.9–32.5 mya) French locality of Ronzon. Many other artiodactyl genera from western Europe went extinct as a result of the Grande Coupure; the Ronzon locality indicates that the Amphimerycidae may have survived past the event but went extinct not long after. The causes of the extinctions of many other mammals in western Europe have been attributed to negative interactions with immigrant faunas (competition, predations), environmental changes from cooling climates, or some combination of the two.
