= Leptotheridium =

Leptotheridium Temporal range: Middle Eocene to Late Eocene 43.5–37 Ma

Scientific classification
- Kingdom: Animalia
- Phylum: Chordata
- Class: Mammalia
- Infraclass: Placentalia
- Order: Artiodactyla
- Genus: †Leptotheridium; Stehlin, 1910

Type species
- †Leptotheridium lugeoni Stehlin, 1910

Other species
- †L. traguloides Stehlin, 1910

Extinct genus of endemic Palaeogene European artiodactyls

Leptotheridium is an extinct genus of Palaeogene artiodactyl endemic to western Europe that lived from the Middle to Late Eocene. It was erected by the Swiss palaeontologist Hans Georg Stehlin in 1910 and contains the species L. lugeoni and L. traguloides. Its phylogenetic position is unclear, with researchers determining that it belonged to either the Anoplotheriidae (specifically the subfamily Dacrytheriinae) or the Xiphodontidae due to its dental and postcranial anatomy. The small-sized artiodactyl genus is unique from its close relatives in that it seemingly lacks the first lower premolars, weak selenodonty (crescent-like ridges) in its dentition, and has three-lobed canines. It is one of the earlier artiodactyl species to have appeared in the fossil record of Europe.

== Taxonomy ==
In 1910, the Swiss palaeontologist Hans Georg Stehlin erected the genus Leptotheridium, which he stated had a dental form similar to that of Catodontherium. The first species that he created was Leptotheridium Lugeoni, designating it as the type species. The species was established based on a partial maxilla with dentition from the Swiss locality of Mormont and was first designated to Rhagatherium valdense by François Jules Pictet de la Rive and Aloïs Humbert in 1869. The second species that he named was L. traguloïdes based on a maxilla fragment from a locality in Egerkingen that was initially classified to Mixtotherium gresslyi by Ludwig Ruetimeyer in 1891. (Note: Due to archaic species naming conventions, authors of the 19th and 20th centuries tended to capitalize species names based on individuals or places. The latin script letter "ï" as used in multiple species names has been replaced by the letter "ï".)

=== Classification ===
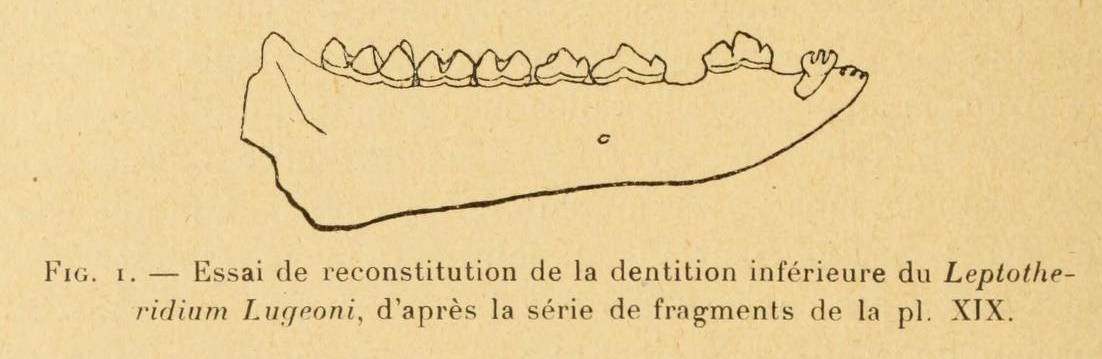
Reconstruction of the mandible of Leptotheridium lugeoni. The position of Leptotheridium within the wider artiodactyl order is unclear.

The taxonomic position of Leptotheridium had long been in dispute as palaeontologists had classified it either to the Anoplotheriidae or Xiphodontidae, two artiodactyl families that were endemic to western Europe during the Palaeogene. In 1910, Stehlin suggested that Leptotheridium was close in affinity to Dacrytherium and Catodontherium, members of the anoplotheriid subfamily Dacrytheriinae. In 1917, the French palaeontologist Charles Depéret placed Leptotheridium in the Dacrytheriidae (now an anoplotheriid subfamily). The systematic placement of Leptotheridium within the Dacrytheriinae (or Dacrytheriidae) had been followed by other palaeontologists like Jean Viret in 1961 and Jean Sudre in 1978.

In 2000, the palaeontologists Jerry J. Hooker and Marc Weidmann reclassified Leptotheridium to the Xiphodontidae, rejecting its previous classification to the Dacrytheriinae due to differences in dental and postcranial anatomy as well as the lack of any preorbital fossa. He argued that its dentition was very to that of Xiphodon, thus further supporting the reclassification. In 2006, Miguel Angel Cuesta et al. chose to follow Hooker and Weidmann in the classification of Leptotheridium to the Xiphodontidae instead of the Anoplotheriidae.

In 2022, Weppe created a phylogenetic analysis in his academic thesis regarding Palaeogene artiodactyl lineages, focusing most specifically on the endemic European families. The phylogenetic tree, according to Weppe, is the first to conduct phylogenetic affinities of all anoplotheriid genera, although not all individual species were included. His research placed Leptotheridium into a clade with the dacrytheriines Catodontherium and Dacrytherium, thus positioning it as a member of the Dacrytheriinae rather than the Xiphodontidae.

== Description ==
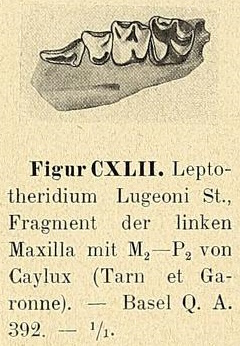
L. lugeoni partial upper dentition

Leptotheridium is described as being a small-sized artiodactyl that lacks preorbital fossae and is diagnosed as having poorly developed selenodont (crescent-like ridges) crests in its dentition, especially evident by the forms of the postprotocrista and postparaconule ridges on the upper molars (M/m). It was smaller than Catodontherium and Dacrytherium in size and has overall bunoselenodont (bunodont (rounded) and selenodont dentition). Unlike with other members of the Anoplotheriidae and Xiphodontidae known by dental sets, that of Leptotheridium is incomplete (meaning that it has fewer than 44 total teeth) because of the lack of a first lower premolar (P/p), or P_{1}.

The canines (C/c) are incisiform (incisor-shaped (I/i)) but are divided into three deep lobes (trilobed). The premolars are not shaped like molars, with P^{4} being elongated and having an external conical point. P^{4} is slightly elongated with a slightly wide back area. P_{2} is very similar to P_{3} in shape but differs by its narrower shape. The upper molars are roughly quadrangular in shape and contain prominent paraconule cusps, which along with the mesostyle cusps are prominent like in Catodontherium but less spherical than in Dacrytherium. There are diastemata in between both the lower canine and P_{2} and the P_{2} and P_{3} teeth; the canine still remains in contact with the incisors.

Leptotheridium was additionally previously by an astragalus previously assigned to it that was described as being very narrow and elongated with a narrow tibial groove and a straight bone axis. However, it was later reassigned to Haplomeryx while some postcranial fossils that were assigned previously to Xiphodon were reclassified to Leptotheridium. In terms of the reassigned astragalus, it is narrow plus elongated in form, its tibial groove appearing narrow but deep. The back calcaneal facet, occupying a significant portion of the astragalus' back face, is wide. The calcaneum appears similar to that of Dacrytherium but differs by a more elongated back tuberosity.

== Palaeoecology ==
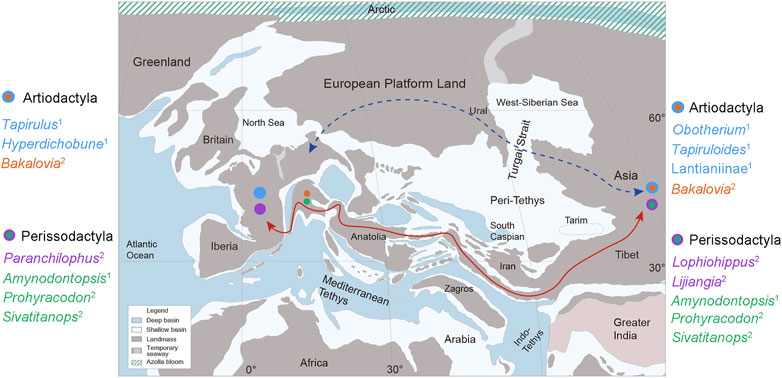
Palaeogeography of Europe and Asia during the Middle Eocene with possible artiodactyl and perissodactyl dispersal routes.

For much of the Eocene, a hothouse climate with humid, tropical environments with consistently high precipitations prevailed. Modern mammalian orders including the Perissodactyla, Artiodactyla, and Primates (or the suborder Euprimates) appeared already by the early Eocene, diversifying rapidly and developing dentitions specialized for folivory. The omnivorous forms mostly either switched to folivorous diets or went extinct by the Middle Eocene (47–37 million years ago) along with the archaic "condylarths". By the Late Eocene (approx. 37–33 mya), most of the ungulate form dentitions shifted from bunodont (or rounded) cusps to cutting ridges (i.e. lophs) for folivorous diets.

Land connections between western Europe and North America were interrupted around 53 Ma. From the early Eocene up until the Grande Coupure extinction event (56–33.9 mya), western Eurasia was separated into three landmasses: western Europe (an archipelago), Balkanatolia (in-between the Paratethys Sea of the north and the Neotethys Ocean of the south), and eastern Eurasia. The Holarctic mammalian faunas of western Europe were therefore mostly isolated from other landmasses including Greenland, Africa, and eastern Eurasia, allowing for endemism to develop. Therefore, the European mammals of the Late Eocene (MP17–MP20 of the Mammal Palaeogene zones) were mostly descendants of endemic Middle Eocene groups.

Leptotheridium, or more specifically L. traguloides, first appeared in the fossil record at the Swiss localities of Egerkingen-Huppersand (MP13? or MP14?) and Egerkingen α + β (MP14). By then, it would have coexisted with perissodactyls (Palaeotheriidae, Lophiodontidae, and Hyrachyidae), non-endemic artiodactyls (Dichobunidae and Tapirulidae), endemic European artiodactyls (Choeropotamidae, Cebochoeridae, and Anoplotheriidae), and primates (Adapidae). The Amphimerycidae and non-disputed members of the Xiphodontidae made their first appearances by the level MP14. The stratigraphic ranges of the early species of L. traguloides also overlapped with metatherians (Herpetotheriidae), cimolestans (Pantolestidae, Paroxyclaenidae), rodents (Ischyromyidae, Theridomyoidea, Gliridae), eulipotyphlans, bats, apatotherians, carnivoraformes (Miacidae), and hyaenodonts (Hyainailourinae, Proviverrinae). Other MP13-MP14 sites have also yielded fossils of turtles and crocodylomorphs, and MP13 sites are stratigraphically the latest to have yielded remains of the bird clades Gastornithidae and Palaeognathae.

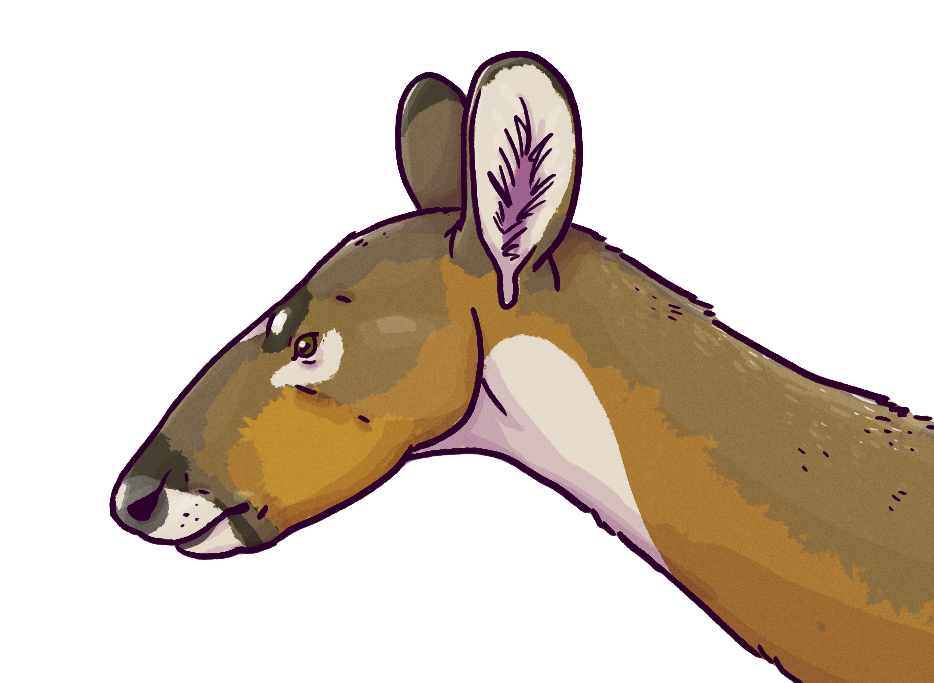
Reconstruction of Dichodon, which had coexisted with Leptotheridium

Based on the Egerkingen α + β locality, L. traguloides coexisted with the herpetotheriid Amphiperatherium, ischyromyids Ailuravus and Plesiarctomys, pseudosciurid Treposciurus, omomyid Necrolemur, adapid Leptadapis, proviverrine Proviverra, palaeotheres (Propalaeotherium, Anchilophus, Lophiotherium, Plagiolophus, Palaeotherium), hyrachyid Chasmotherium, lophiodont Lophiodon, dichobunids Hyperdichobune and Mouillacitherium, choeropotamid Rhagatherium, anoplotheriid Catodontherium, amphimerycid Pseudamphimeryx, cebochoerid Cebochoerus, tapirulid Tapirulus, mixtotheriid Mixtotherium, and the xiphodonts Dichodon and Haplomeryx.

MP16 marks the first appearance of L. lugeoni and the last known appearance of L. traguloides based on occurrences at multiple localities such as Robiac and Lavergne. Within the French locality of Le Bretou, both species of Leptotheridium cooccurred with the herpetotheriids Amphiperatherium and Peratherium, pseudorhyncocyonid Leptictidium, nyctitheres Cryptotopos and Saturninia, notharctid Anchomomys, omomyids Necrolemur and Pseudoloris, glirid Glamys, pseudosciurid Sciuroides, bats (Carcinipteryx, Hipposideros, Palaeophyllophora, Vaylatsia, Vespertiliavus), proviverrine Allopterodon, carnivoraforme Quercygale, cebochoerids Acotherulum and Cebochoerus, anoplotheriids (Catodontherium, Dacrytherium and Robiatherium), xiphodonts (Xiphodon, Dichodon, Haplomeryx), dichobunids Dichobune and Mouillacitherium, lophiodont Lophiodon, and palaeotheres (Anchilophus, Eurohippus, Pachynolophus, Metanchilophus, Leptolophus, Plagiolophus, Palaeotherium).

After MP16, faunal turnover occurred, marking the disappearances of the lophiodonts and European hyrachyids as well as the extinctions of all European crocodylomorphs except for the alligatoroid Diplocynodon. The causes of the faunal turnover have been attributed to a shift from humid and highly tropical environments to drier and more temperate forests with open areas and more abrasive vegetation. The surviving herbivorous faunas shifted their dentitions and dietary strategies accordingly to adapt to abrasive and seasonal vegetation. The environments were still subhumid and full of subtropical evergreen forests, however. The Palaeotheriidae was the sole remaining European perissodactyl group, and frugivorous-folivorous or purely folivorous artiodactyls became the dominant group in western Europe.

The temporal range of Leptotheridium occurred up to MP17b, as evident by the appearances of L. aff. lugeoni in the French locality of Fons 4 (MP17a) and L. cf. lugeoni in another French locality of Perrière. In Perrière, its fossils were found with those of the herpetotheriids Peratherium and Amphiperatherium, pseudorhyncocyonid Pseudorhyncocyon, apatemyid Heterohyus, nyctitheriid Saturninia, various bats, rodents (Gliridae, Theridomyidae), omomyids Pseudoloris and Microchoerus, adapid Leptadapis, hyaenodontid Hyenodon, miacid Quercygale, palaeotheres (Lophiotherium, Palaeotherium, and Plagiolophis), dichobunid Mouillacitherium, cebochoerid Acotherulum, mixtothere Mixtotherium, anoplotheriid Dacrytherium, tapirulid Tapirulus, xiphodonts Dichodon and Haplomeryx, and the amphimerycid Pseudamphimeryx.
