= Eocene–Oligocene extinction event =

Mass extinction event 33.9 million years ago

Eocene–Oligocene extinction is labeled E– OG.

The Eocene–Oligocene extinction event, also called the Eocene-Oligocene transition (EOT) and Grande Coupure in Europe, is the transition between the end of the Eocene and the beginning of the Oligocene, an extinction event and faunal turnover occurred from around 33.9 to 33.4 million years ago. Between 11–15.6% of marine genera went extinct during the transition and is considered to be one of the largest extinction events of marine invertebrates of the Cenozoic. However, the extinction rate of marine genera during EOT was minor comparison to the other mass extinction events. In terrestrial ecosystems, it saw the extinction of mammalian clades such as Multituberculata, Xiphodontidae, Amphimerycidae, and Proviverrinae.

Most experts believe the cause of the extinction was the result of permanent glaciation of Antarctica, which caused sea levels to drop ~70 m (230 ft). The permanent glaciation of Antarctica ended the greenhouse climate of the early Paleogene, shifting the climate to a more icehouse climate. Some experts have also hypothesized the extinction was caused by extraterrestrial impacts, although correlation with the extinction event has been questioned.

== Possible Causes ==
=== Glaciation ===
The boundary between the Eocene and Oligocene epochs is marked by the glaciation of Antarctica and the consequent beginning of the Late Cenozoic Ice Age. This enormous shift in climatic regime is the leading candidate for the extinction event's cause. Though ephemeral ice sheets may have existed on the Antarctic continent during parts of the Middle and Late Eocene, this interval of severe global cooling marked the beginning of permanent ice sheet coverage of Antarctica, and thus the end of the greenhouse climate of the Early Paleogene. In central North America, the mean annual temperature (MAT) fell by around 8.2 ± 3.1 °C over a span of around 400,000 years. Near-freezing conditions existed in central Tibet. The global cooling also correlated with marked drying conditions in low-latitudes Asia, though a causal relationship between the two has been contradicted by some research. The South China Sea experienced drops in both temperature and precipitation; a sharp temperature drop is likewise known to have occurred in the northern Indian Ocean. The equatorial seas were marked by exceptionally low palaeoproductivity in the EOT's aftermath. Deep ocean temperatures plummeted in the eastern equatorial Pacific during the EOT.

A leading model of climate cooling at this time predicts a decrease in atmospheric carbon dioxide, which slowly declined over the course of the Middle to Late Eocene. Significant cooling took place in the final hundreds of thousands of years prior to the start of major Antarctic glaciation. This cooling reached some threshold around 34 million years ago, precipitating the formation of a large ice sheet in East Antarctica in response to falling carbon dioxide levels. The cause of the drop in pCO_{2} was the drift of the Indian Subcontinent into equatorial latitudes, supercharging the silicate weathering of the Deccan Traps. Another factor was the opening of the Drake Passage and the creation of the Antarctic Circumpolar Current (ACC), which had the effect of creating ocean gyres that promote upwelling of cold bottom waters and diminishing heat transport to Antarctica by isolating the water around it. Likewise, the Tasmanian Gateway also opened up around the time of the EOT. Ocean circulation changes were, however, not as significant in engendering cooling as the decline in pCO_{2}. On top of that, the timing of the creation of the ACC is uncertain. The deepening of the calcite compensation depth increased carbonate ion storage in the ocean shortly before the onset of the Antarctic glaciation, suggesting the events may have been coupled.

Evidence points to the glaciation of Antarctica occurring in two steps, with the first step, the less pronounced and more modest step of the two, taking place at the Eocene-Oligocene boundary itself. This first step is referred to as EOT-1, which occurred around 34.1 to 33.9 million years ago. Carbon dioxide concentrations dropped from about 885 ppm to about 560 ppm. The Oligocene Oi-1 event, an oxygen isotope excursion that occurred around 33.55 million years ago, was the second major pulse of Antarctic ice sheet formation. A third, transient glaciation that occurred ~34.4 Ma known as the Late Eocene Event (LEE) preceded both.

These large climate changes have been linked to biotic turnovers. Even before the Eocene-Oligocene boundary itself, during the early Priabonian, extinction rates went up in connection with falling global temperatures. Radiolarians suffered major losses due to a decrease in nutrient availability in deep and intermediate waters. In the Gulf of Mexico, marine turnover is associated with climatic change, though the ultimate cause according to the study was not the drop in average temperatures themselves but colder winters and increased seasonality.

On land, the increased seasonality brought on by this abrupt cooling caused the Grande Coupure faunal turnover in Europe. In the Ebro Basin, major aridification occurred amidst the Grande Coupure, suggesting causality. The remarkable cooling period in the ocean is correlated with pronounced mammalian faunal replacement within continental Asia as well. The Asian biotic reorganization events are comparable to the Grande Coupure in Europe and the Mongolian Remodeling of mammalian communities.

=== Extraterrestrial impact ===
Another speculation points to several large meteorite impacts near this time, including those of the 40-kilometre-diameter (25 mi) Chesapeake Bay crater and the 100-kilometre-diameter (62 mi) Popigai impact structure of central Siberia, which scattered debris perhaps as far as Europe. New dating of the Popigai meteor strengthens its association with the extinction. However, other studies have failed to find any association between the extinction event and any impact event. Wolbach et al. (2004) suggested the impacts couldn't release global wildfires as they didn't generate energy as great as the Chicxulub crater. Molina et al. (2006) analysis on foraminiferal found no evidence of the impact events playing a role in a foraminiferal extinction event as it occurred at the Eocene-Oligocene boundary, at least a million years after the impact events. Prothero (2006) criticized the extraterrestrial impact hypothesis as the transition lasted for millions of years. Wade and Cheng, in their 2024 paper, found no evidence long term paleoclimatic shifts being correlated with the meteorite impacts, suggesting despite close temporal space between large meteorite impacts, the planet was unscratched.

=== Solar activity ===
Imprints of sunspot cycles from the Bohai Bay Basin show no evidence that any significant change in solar activity occurred across the EOT.

== Extinction patterns ==
=== Terrestrial biota ===
In central North America, reptiles, amphibians, and gastropods underwent drastic faunal turnover likely spurred on by a precipitous drop in mean annual temperature over around 400,000 years. Multituberculates went extinct because of the decline of boreal forests of dawn redwoods and Chinese swamp cypress, and possibly competition from songbirds, and paromomyids. Brontotheres also went extinct at the boundary, due to the changes in large-scale replacement of Late Eocene forests, which were replaced by savannas.

In Madagascar, Lemurs experienced a significant extinction during the EOT. In Afro-Arabia, anthropoids and hystricognaths saw a notable decline in diversity, Afro-Arabian hyaenodonts also saw a notable drop in diversity. There is also evidence of regional extinctions and turnover of the Australian biota, especially in eastern Australia.

On the other hand, South American mammals appear not to have been strongly influenced by the EOT. The faunal turnovers observed on the continent appear to have been longer and more drawn out, related to longer term changes such as the gradual cooling over the latter half of the Eocene, the gradual uplift of the Andes, and the spread of grassland ecosystems. Likewise, East Asian faunal turnovers did occur, but they appear to have been asynchronous and not directly related to the global climatic changes of the EOT.

==== Grande Coupure ====
The Grande Coupure, 'great break' in French, with a major European turnover in mammalian fauna around 33.5 million years ago, marks the end of the last phase of Eocene assemblages, the Priabonian, and the arrival in Europe of Asian species. The Grande Coupure is characterized by widespread extinctions and allopatric speciation in small isolated relict populations. It was given its name in 1910 by the Swiss palaeontologist Hans Georg Stehlin, to characterise the dramatic turnover of European mammalian fauna, which he placed at the Eocene–Oligocene boundary. A comparable turnover in Asian fauna has since been called the "Mongolian Remodelling".

The Grande Coupure marks a break between endemic European faunas before the break and mixed faunas with a strong Asian component afterwards. Before the Grande Coupure, European faunas were dominated by anoplotheriid, xiphodontid, choeropotamid, cebochoerid, dichobunid, and amphimerycid artiodactyls, palaeotheriid perissodactyls, pseudosciurid rodents, adapid and omomyid primates, and nyctitheriids. Post-Grande Coupure artiodactyl faunas in Europe are dominated by gelocids, anthracotheriids, and entelodontids, with true rhinoceroses representing the perissodactyl fauna, eomyids, hamsters, and beavers representing the rodent fauna, and hedgehogs representing the eulipotyphlan fauna. The speciose genus Palaeotherium plus Anoplotherium and the families Xiphodontidae and Amphimerycidae were observed to disappear completely during the Grande Coupure. An element of the paradigm of the Grande Coupure was the apparent extinction of all European primates at the Grande Coupure. However, the 1999 discovery of a mouse-sized early Oligocene omomyid, reflecting the better survival chances of small mammals, undercut the Grande Coupure paradigm. Herpetotheriids, cainotheriids, dormice, and theridomyids survived the Grande Coupure undiminished. Balkanatolia acted as a staging ground for Asian taxa that immigrated into Europe following the extinction of its own mammal fauna during the Grande Coupure.

Among mammalian predators, hyaenodonts were the most diverse group of carnivores prior to Grande Coupure, with hyaenodontoids being the most diverse group. During the Grande Coupure, hyaenodonts saw a significant decline in diversity, which saw the extinction of European hyainailourines and the endemic hyaenodontoids, proviverrines. Following the Grande Coupure, carnivoraforms replaced hyaenodonts as the dominant group of mammalian carnivores.

It has been suggested that this was caused by climate change associated with the earliest polar glaciations and a major fall in sea levels, or by competition with taxa dispersing from Asia. However, recent analyses had questioned competitive replacement between Western European and Asian faunas. Other possible causes are related to the impact of one or more large bolides in the Northern Hemisphere at Popigai, Toms Canyon, and Chesapeake Bay. Improved correlation of northwest European successions to global events confirms the Grande Coupure as occurring in the earliest Oligocene, with a hiatus of around 350,000 years prior to the first record of post-Grande Coupure Asian immigrant taxa. Research suggests that in the Ebro Basin of Spain, the turnover lagged the Eocene-Oligocene boundary by at most 500,000 years.

==== Caribbean Mangrove Revolution ====
In the Caribbean Sea, mangroves dominated by Pelliciera rapidly disappeared, becoming replaced by mangroves that were dominated by Rhizophora, which remains the main constituent of Caribbean mangroves in the present day. This turnover has been named the Caribbean Mangrove Revolution.

=== Marine biota ===
The EOT saw one of the largest extinctions of marine invertebrates in the Cenozoic, with 11-15.6% of marine genera going extinct. Prior to the extinction, frequency of drilling in recovery faunas, especially among bivalves, a phenomenon attributed to a high extinction rate among escalated prey taxa with highly evolved defences against predators. Veneroid bivalves experienced a short-term size increase during the biotic recovery. Orthophragminid foraminifera (late Paleocene–early Eocene larger benthic foraminifera of two families, Discocyclinidae and Orbitoclypeidae) disappeared in the extinction event; in Alpine carbonates, bryozoan facies show an expansion in response to the loss of orthophragminids. The EOT is often considered to be a critical turning point in the rise of diatoms to their present-day evolutionary prominence, though this paradigm has been criticised for being based on incomplete evidence. Nummulites experienced a radiation and an increase in morphospace.

Morphospace and diversification analyses have found the transition had a notable impact on sharks. Both lamniforms and carcharhiniforms saw a significant decline in diversity. Despite suffering a diversification decline, lamniforms saw an increase in dental disparity, while carcharhinforms saw a decline. Much like lamniformes and carcharhiniforms, orectolobiforms and squaliforms saw a decline in diversity. Hexanchiformes saw no notable impact on their diversity.

Molecular evidence indicates that members of the clade Gobiiformes actually exploded in diversity as part of the faunal turnover at the EOT, with Eleotridae, Oxudercidae, and Gobiidae emerging as distinct families around this time.

Some sites contain evidence that the Eocene–Oligocene extinction was not a sudden event but a prolonged biotic transition drawn out over as much as 6 million years. Localities near Eugene, Oregon, record a plant extinction around 33.4 million years ago and a marine invertebrate turnover around 33.2 million years ago; both of these turnovers post-date the supposed extinction event by hundreds of thousands of years.
