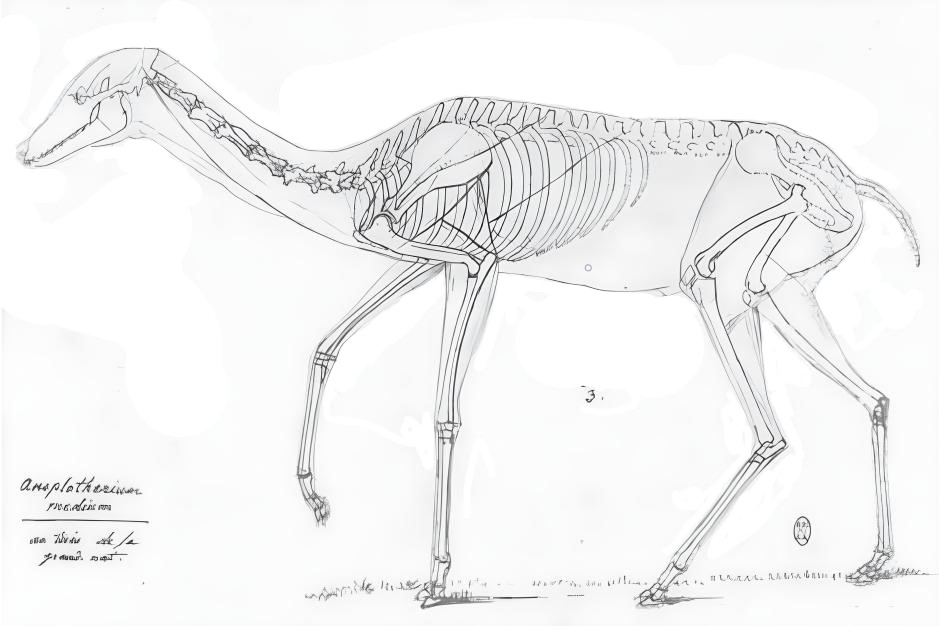
- Drawing of Xiphodon by Georges Cuvier
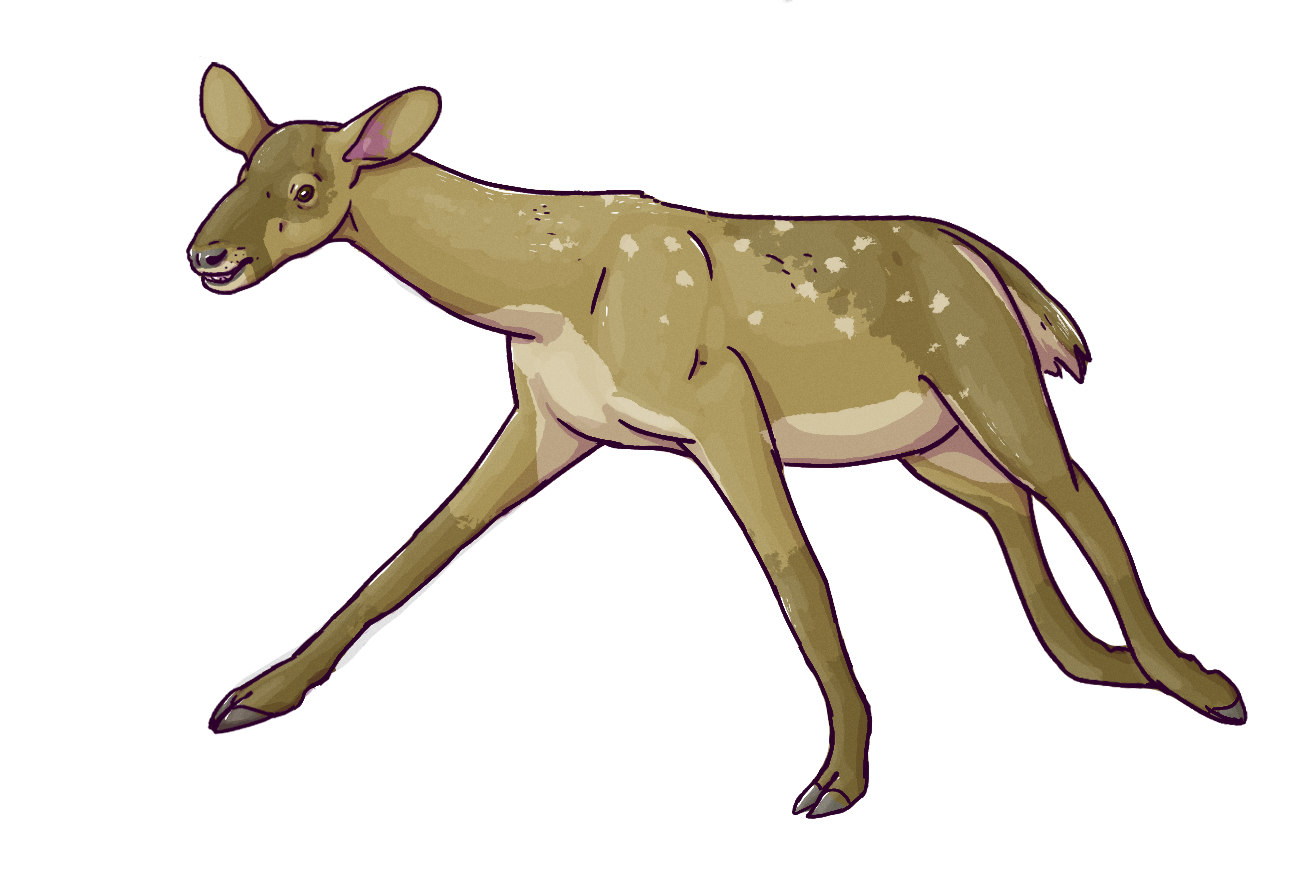
- Life restoration of Xiphodon

Scientific classification
- Kingdom: Animalia
- Phylum: Chordata
- Class: Mammalia
- Infraclass: Placentalia
- Order: Artiodactyla
- Family: †Xiphodontidae; Flower, 1883

Genera
- †Dichodon †Haplomeryx †Paraxiphodon †Xiphodon

= Xiphodontidae =

Xiphodontidae Temporal range: 40.4–28.1 Ma

Extinct family of mammals

Xiphodontidae (from Ancient Greek ξίφος (xíphos), meaning "sword", and ὀδούς (odoús), meaning "tooth") is an extinct family of herbivorous even-toed ungulates (order Artiodactyla), endemic to Europe during the Eocene 40.4—33.9 million years ago, existing for about 7.5 million years. Paraxiphodon suggests that they survived into the Lower Oligocene, at least.

== Description ==
The molar teeth of xiphodontids are brachydont (low crowned) and selenodont.

== Taxonomy ==
The Xiphodontidae were named by Flower (1883). It was assigned to Artiodactyla by Cope (1889); to Xiphodontoidea by Hooker (1986); and to Tylopoda by Carroll (1988). A 2020 study suggested them to be related to ruminants, as well as other Europe-endemic artiodactyls like Cainotheriidae and Anoplotheriidae.
