= Palembertina =

Palembertina Temporal range: Priabonian

Scientific classification
- Kingdom: Animalia
- Phylum: Chordata
- Class: Mammalia
- Infraclass: Placentalia
- Order: Artiodactyla
- Family: †Cainotheriidae
- Genus: †Palembertina
- Species: †P. desplasi

Binomial name
- †Palembertina desplasi Weppe et al., 2020

Extinct monotypic genus of cainotheriid artiodactyl

Palembertina is an extinct monotypic genus of cainotheriid ungulate that lived in Europe during the Priabonian stage of the Eocene epoch.

== Etymology ==
The generic name Palembertina references the fossil site of Palembert in France, where the holotype was found. The specific epithet of the type species, Palembertina desplasi, honours the palaeontologist Claude Desplas for his discoveries of fossils in the Quercy Phosphorites Formation. The species was originally published as Palembertina deplasi, but this was later corrected to Palembertina desplasi because the original epithet misspelled Desplas's name.
