= Caenomeryx =

Caenomeryx Temporal range: Early Oligocene–Late Oligocene

Scientific classification
- Kingdom: Animalia
- Phylum: Chordata
- Class: Mammalia
- Order: Artiodactyla
- Family: †Cainotheriidae
- Genus: †Caenomeryx; Hürzeler, 1936

Type species
- Caenomeryx filholi Lydekker, 1885

Other species
- Caenomeryx procommunis Filhol, 1877

Extinct genus of cainotheriid artiodactyl

Caenomeryx is an extinct genus of cainotheriid artiodactyl that lived in Western Europe during the Rupelian and Chattian stages of the Oligocene epoch.

== Distribution ==
Fossils of Caenomeryx are known from France.

== Palaeobiology ==
=== Life history ===
Caenomeryx filholi had a tooth eruption sequence of M_{1} – M_{2} – I_{1} – I_{2} – M_{3} – I_{3} – C_{1} – (P_{2} – P_{3} – P_{4}).
