= Parvitragulus =

Parvitragulus Temporal range: Late Eocene

Scientific classification
- Kingdom: Animalia
- Phylum: Chordata
- Class: Mammalia
- Infraclass: Placentalia
- Order: Artiodactyla
- Family: †Hypertragulidae
- Genus: †Parvitragulus; Emry, 1978
- Species: †P. priscus

Binomial name
- †Parvitragulus priscus Emry, 1978
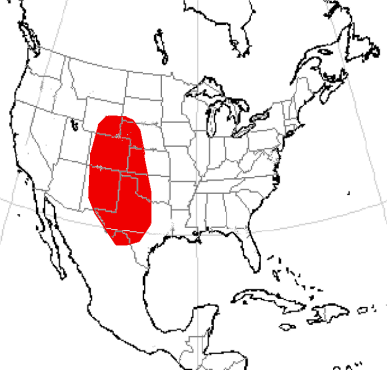
- Range of Nanotragulus based on fossil record

Extinct genus of mammals

Parvitragulus (from Latin parvus, meaning "little", and tragulus, meaning "small goat", and thus, "little goat") is an extinct genus of hypertragulid ruminant endemic to North America with only one species, Parvitragulus priscus. It lived during the Late Eocene, 37–33.7 Ma, existing for approximately 3 million years. Its fossils have been found in Wyoming, Nebraska, and Texas. The species name come from Latin priscus, meaning ancient.

Parvitragulus were primitive and ancient ruminants, resembling small deer or musk deer, although they were more closely related to modern chevrotains. Its diet is stated to be that of a frugivore.
