= Archaeomeryx =

Archaeomeryx Temporal range: Early Eocene

Scientific classification
- Domain: Eukaryota
- Kingdom: Animalia
- Phylum: Chordata
- Class: Mammalia
- Order: Artiodactyla
- Family: †Archaeomerycidae
- Genus: †Archaeomeryx; Matthew & Granger, 1925
- Species: †A. optatus

Binomial name
- †Archaeomeryx optatus Matthew & Granger, 1925

Extinct genus of deer

Archaeomeryx is an extinct genus of ruminant that lived early in the Eocene. It is believed to be close to the ancestry of the group Pecora, which includes deer, giraffes, cows and their relatives. Unlike the modern members of this group, it had a set of functioning incisors in the upper jaw. It was small in size, comparable to a modern-day mouse deer. It was also very rabbit-like and had several distinctive characteristics. It lived in present-day China 35 to 40 million years ago.
