= Lophiomeryx =

Lophiomeryx Temporal range: Eocene–Miocene

Scientific classification
- Kingdom: Animalia
- Phylum: Chordata
- Class: Mammalia
- Order: Artiodactyla
- Family: †Lophiomerycidae
- Genus: †Lophiomeryx; Pomel, 1853

Extinct genus of mammals

Lophiomeryx is an extinct genus of lophiomerycid artiodactyl that lived in Eurasia during the Palaeogene and Neogene periods.

== Distribution ==
The species L. shinaoensis, L. gracilis, and L. triangularis are known from the Early Oligocene of Mongolia.
