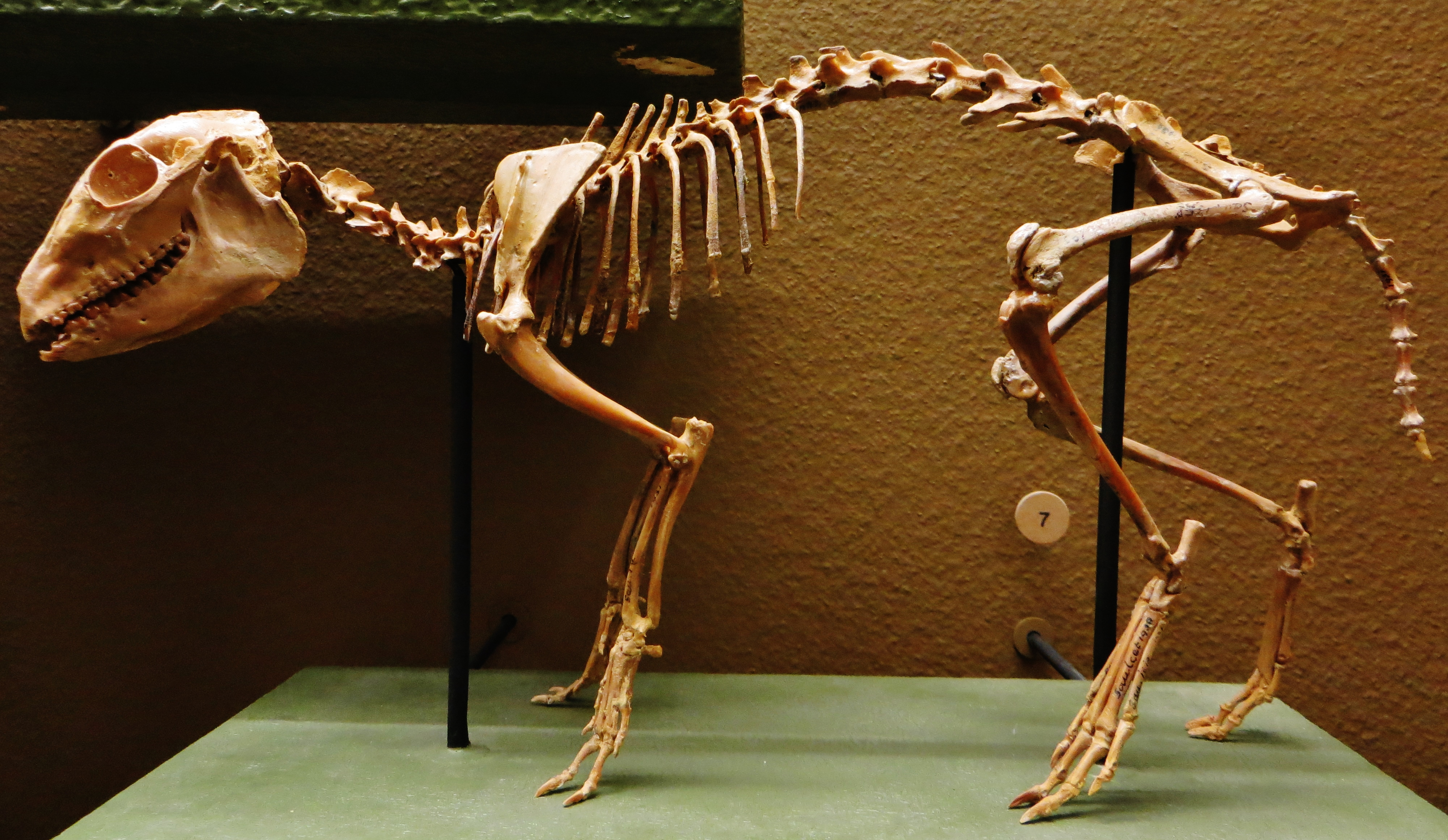
- Restoration

Scientific classification
- Domain: Eukaryota
- Kingdom: Animalia
- Phylum: Chordata
- Class: Mammalia
- Order: Artiodactyla
- Family: †Cainotheriidae
- Genus: †Cainotherium; Bravard, 1828

Type species
- †Microtherium renggeri von Meyer 1837

Species
- C. renggeri (von Meyer, 1837); C. laticurvatum Geoffroy Saint-Hilaire, 1833; C. commune Bravard, 1835; C. miocaenicum Crusafont-Pairó et al., 1955; C. bavaricum Berger, 1959; C. lintillae Baudelot & Grouzel, 1974; C. huerzeleri Heizmann, 1983

Synonyms
- Caenotherium Agassiz 1846; Crinotherium Filhol 1882; Microtherium renggeri von Meyer, 1837; C. minimum Bravard 1835; Caenotherium elegans Pomel 1846 (syn. of C. laticurvatum); C. metopias Pomel 1851; C. laticurvatum ligericum Ginsburg et al. 1985

= Cainotherium =

Cainotherium Temporal range: Eocene–Early Miocene

Extinct genus of mammals

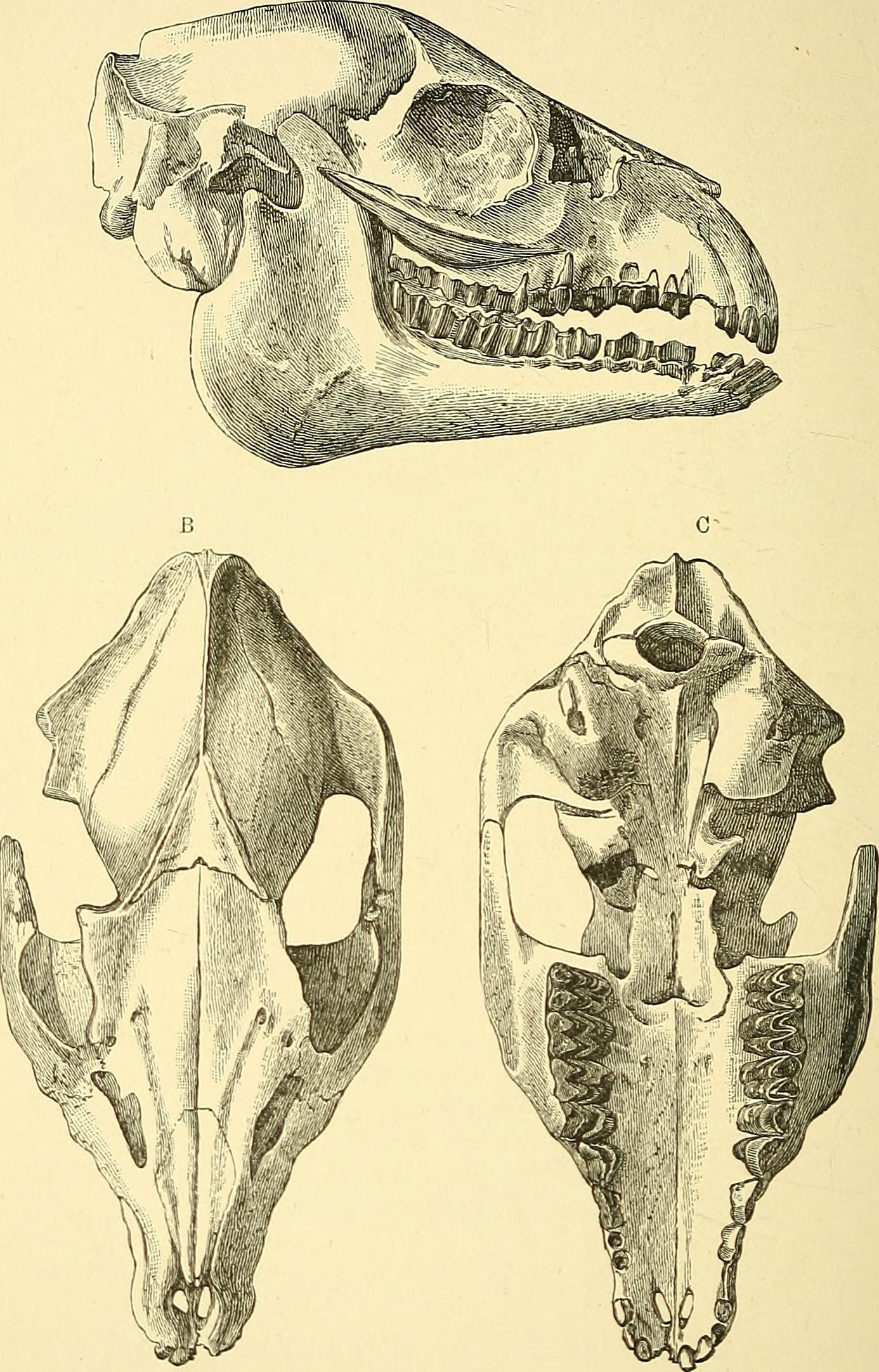
Lithograph from 1896

Cainotherium is an extinct genus of rabbit-sized prehistoric even-toed ungulates. These herbivores lived in Europe from the Eocene until the early Miocene. The skeletal anatomy of these hare-like animals suggest they, along with other members of Cainotheriidae, belong to the artiodactyl suborder Tylopoda, together with oreodonts and modern camelids. Species had cloven hooves, similar to those of bovids or deer, although the shape and length of the limbs suggests that the living animals moved by leaping, like a rabbit. The shape of the teeth also suggests a rabbit-like diet of nibbled vegetation, while the size of the auditory bulla and shape of the brain suggest that it would have had good senses of hearing and smell.
