= Balkanatolia =

Former island continent

For around 10 million years until the end of the Eocene, Balkanatolia was an island continent or a series of islands, separate from Asia and also from Western Europe. The Balkanatolian landmass comprises the approximate region of the modern Balkans and Anatolia. Fossil mammals from this area are distinct from the mammalian fauna of either western Europe or Asia.

In southeastern Europe, Eocene finds of Amynodontidae, Hyracodontidae, Brontotheriidae, and Anthracotheriidae have affinities to Asian, but not western European, species. This Asian-related fauna in Balkanatolia remained distinct from the fauna of Western Europe for as much as 10 million years before the Eocene–Oligocene extinction event, the Grande Coupure when Antarctic glaciation began, sea levels fell and land migration to Western Europe became possible; the endemic western European fauna disappeared and was largely replaced by Asian forms. Some of these Asian forms may have arrived in Western Europe from Balkanatolia.

Fossils of bachitheriids and cricetid rodents in the Balkans indicate that invasive mammals from Asia began to colonize the southeastern Europe element of Balkanatolia in the middle or late Eocene, sometime between the Lutetian and the Priabonian stages.

Within Balkanatolia the fauna of southeastern Europe also differed from that of Anatolia; this might be an artefact of the research process to date, but there may have been internal barriers to movement between eastern and western Balkanatolia.
