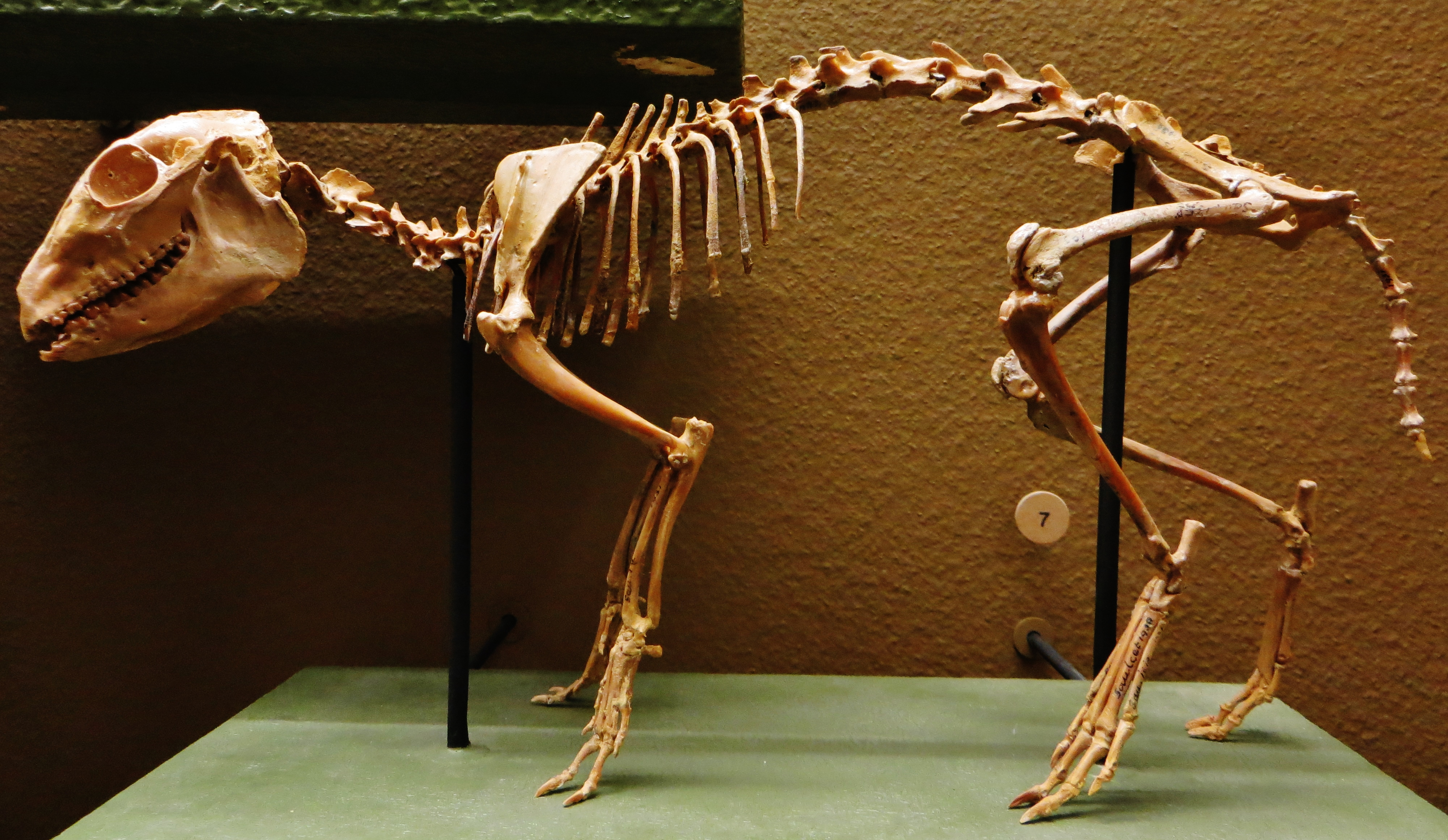
- Cainotherium skeleton restoration

Scientific classification
- Domain: Eukaryota
- Kingdom: Animalia
- Phylum: Chordata
- Class: Mammalia
- Order: Artiodactyla
- Superfamily: †Anoplotherioidea
- Family: †Cainotheriidae; Cope, 1881

Subfamilies
- Cainotheriinae: Caenomeryx; Cainotherium; Plesiomeryx; Oxacroninae: Oxacron; Paroxacron

= Cainotheriidae =

Cainotheriidae Temporal range: Late Eocene - Middle Miocene,

Extinct family of mammals

Cainotheriidae is an extinct family of artiodactyls known from the Late Eocene to Middle Miocene of Europe. They are mostly found preserved in karstic deposits.

These animals were small in size, and generally did not exceed 15 centimetres (5.9 in) in height at the shoulders, ranging in size from those of rabbits to tragulids. For a long time, they were considered to have a similar lifestyle to hares and rabbits. The dentition was full and highly selenodont, i.e. the premolars and molars had curved and crescent-shaped cutting edges (as in today's ruminants). The skull was small, with a short snout and orbits closed posteriorly placed at the center of the skull.

A peculiar characteristic of this group were the auditory bulla, protective structures of the bones of the ear : they were very large, like those that are found today in small mammals that live in open and dry environments. This evolved cranial anatomy was in stark contrast to the rest of the skeleton, rather primitive: the cainotheriids still possessed four non-reduced toes (an ancestral condition of the artiodactyls), even if the lateral fingers were shorter; they ended in long claws, as in modern rabbits. The hind legs were much longer than the front ones, and indicate a remarkable adaptation to running and jumping.

== Classification ==
The bizarre anatomical features of the cainotheriids denote them as primitive artiodactyls. Previous research placed them near to Tylopoda, more recent research places them closer to Ruminantia. Robiacina of the middle/upper Eocene was previously classified as a member of this family, but has been more recently split into a separate family as the sister taxon to Cainotheriidae. In the course of the Upper Eocene primitive genera such as Oxacron and Paroxacron developed, considered the first true cainotheriids as sister taxa in the subfamily Oxacroninae.

Subsequently, in the course of the Oligocene, the subfamily Cainotheriinae underwent a discrete evolutionary radiation, with the rabbit-sized genera Plesiomeryx and Caenomeryx. The most specialized genus, Cainotherium, was also the last to disappear, during the middle Miocene. Even at the beginning of the Miocene, these animals were quite common in various parts of Europe, with numerous species (e.g. C. laticurvatum, C. miocenicum, C. bavaricum). The cainotheriids died out definitively when, during the Miocene, the climate became colder.

== Paleoecology ==
These small ungulate animals possessed exceptionally long hind legs; this characteristic, combined with small size and large auditory bulla, has led many scholars to consider cainoterids a sort of ecological parallel of rabbits. It was therefore assumed that these animals proceeded to leap thanks to the long hind legs, but the discovery of fossil traces of the lower Miocene found in the locality of Salinas de Anana in Spain, clearly left by Cainotherium, showed that the locomotion of these animals had to be very different from that of rabbits, and quite similar to that of the current small ruminants.
