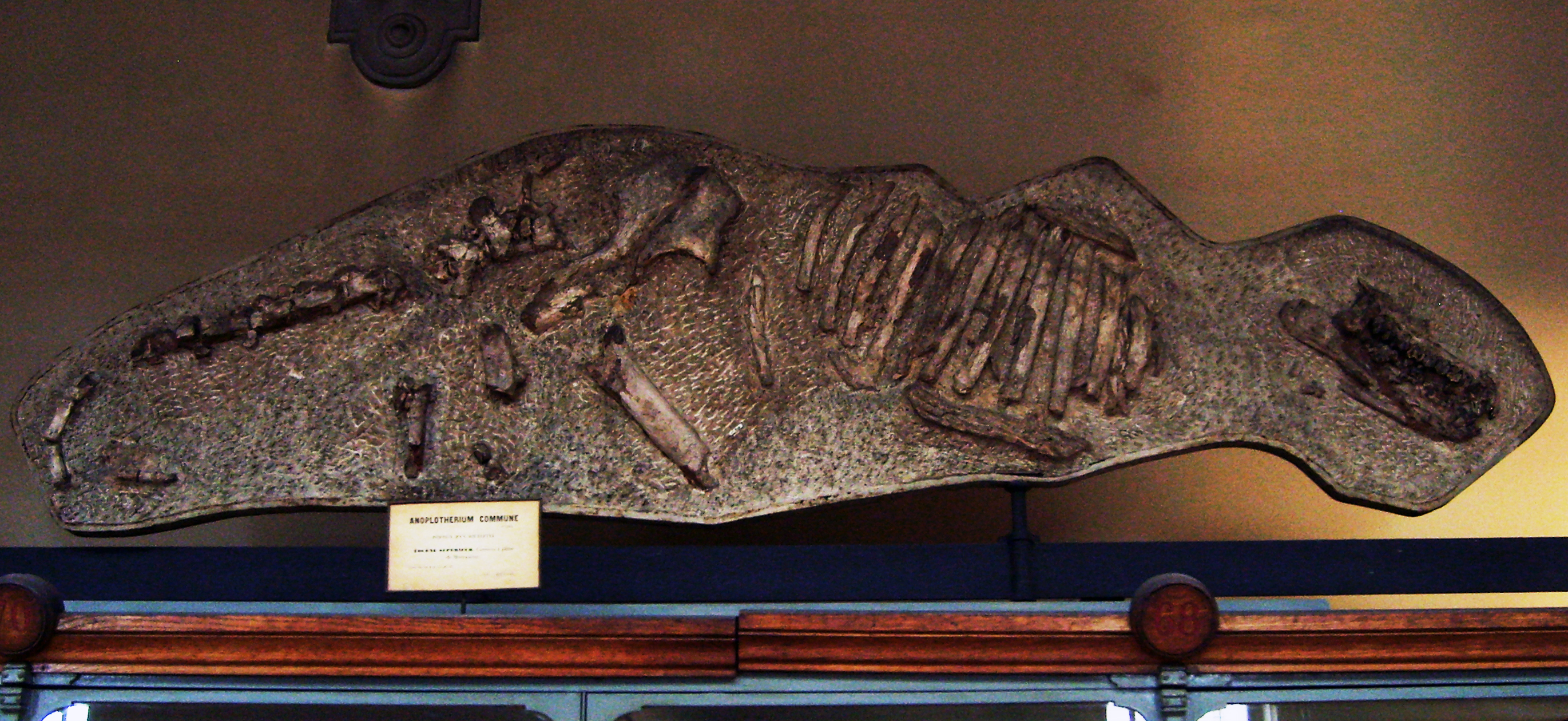
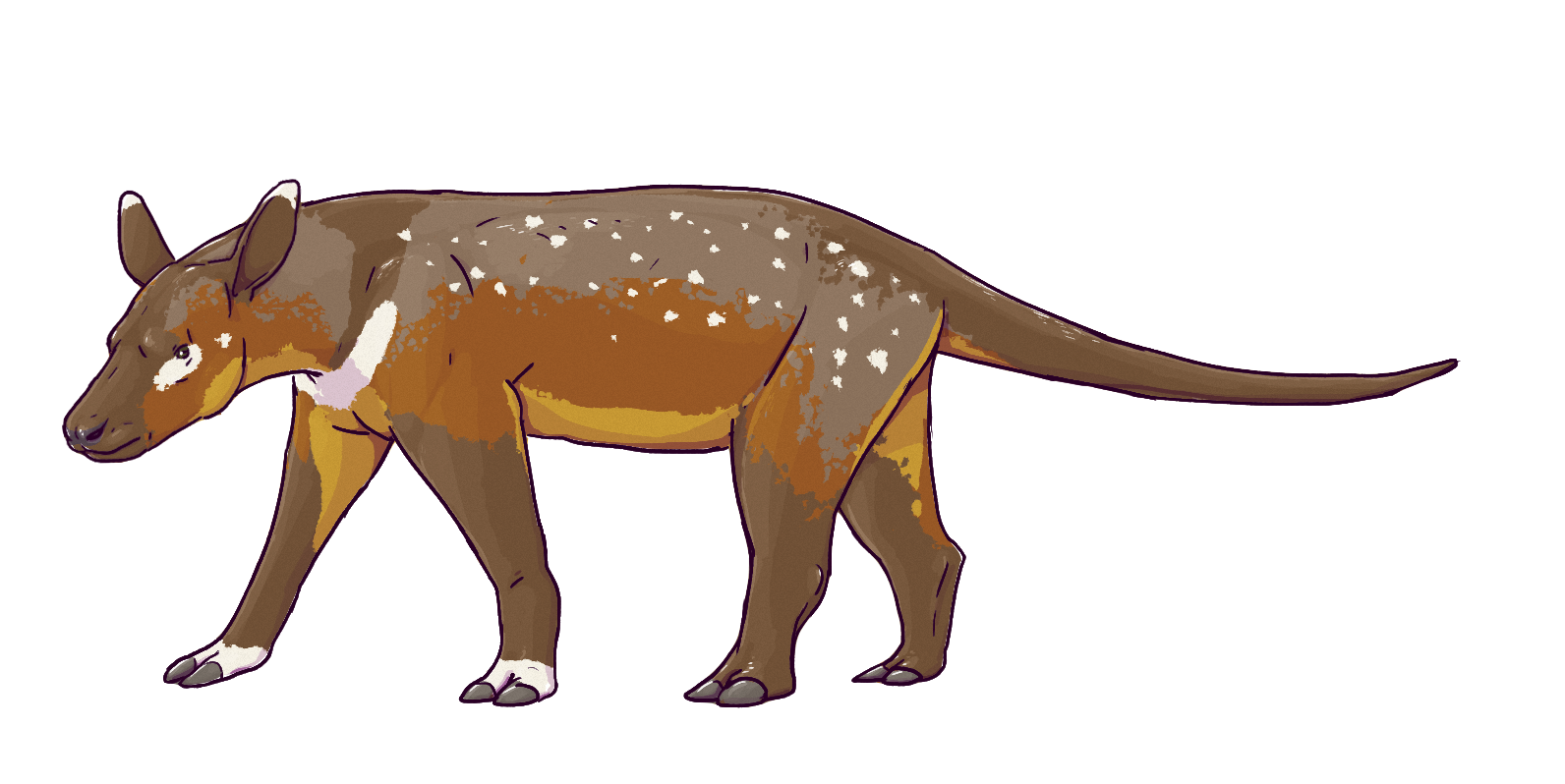
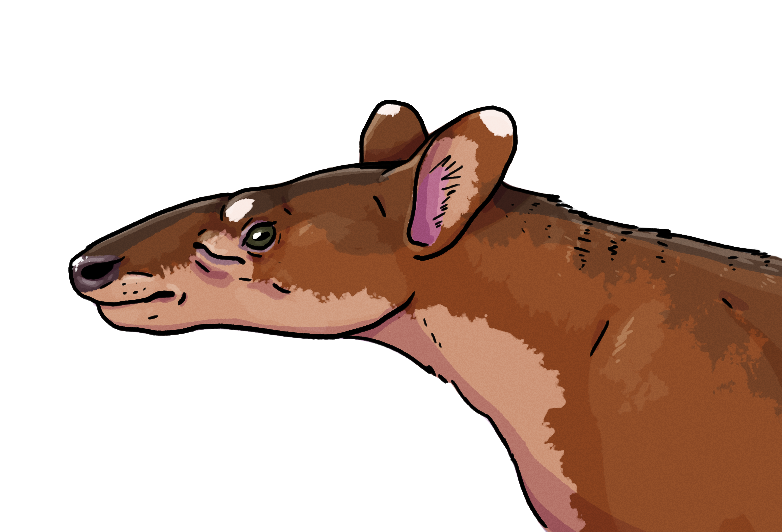
- Anoplotherium commune skeleton, National Museum of Natural History, France Life restoration of Anoplotherium commune Head restoration of Dacrytherium ovinum

Scientific classification
- Kingdom: Animalia
- Phylum: Chordata
- Class: Mammalia
- Order: Artiodactyla
- Family: †Anoplotheriidae; Gray, 1821

Type genus
- Anoplotherium Cuvier, 1804

Subfamilies
- Anoplotheriinae Viret, 1961; Anoplotherium; Diplobune; Ephelcomenus; Robiatherium; Duerotherium; Dacrytheriinae Depéret, 1917; Dacrytherium; Catodontherium

= Anoplotheriidae =

Anoplotheriidae Temporal range: Middle Eocene to Early Oligocene 44.9–30 Ma

Extinct family of artiodactyls

Anoplotheriidae is an extinct family of artiodactyls exclusive to the Palaeogene that was endemic to western Europe and lived from the Middle Eocene to the Early Oligocene. The Anoplotheriidae is divided into two subfamilies: the Anoplotheriinae and the Dacrytheriinae. The type genus of the Anoplotheriinae is Anoplotherium and includes several other genera like Diplobune and Ephelcomenus. In contrast, Dacrytheriinae was limited to Dacrytherium and Catodontherium. The taxonomic history of anoplotheriids began as early as 1804 with the naming of Anoplotherium. The Anoplotheriidae was erected by the British zoologist John Edward Gray in 1821. Many other anoplotheriid genera were named from between the late 19th and early 21st centuries, although the dacrytheriines were initially assigned to their own family before eventually being reclassified as an anoplotheriid subfamily. The superfamily "Anoplotherioidea" had sometimes been utilized by taxonomists, although its taxonomic definition is uncertain. Anoplotheriids are thought to have been closely related to other extinct and contemporaneous artiodactyl families in western Europe, but the broader-level classifications of them are yet to be resolved.

Anoplotheriids were relatively medium to large in size, ranging in estimated weights from about 13.2 kg (29 lb) in Dacrytherium to about 266 kg (586 lb) in Anoplotherium. Anoplotheriid taxa vary from one another, but usually display a degree of selenodonty (crescent-shaped ridges), which point towards leaf-eating diets, and a complete dental row of 44 teeth with limited amounts of diastemata (gaps between teeth). Dacrytheriines differ from anoplotheriines in that they have a preorbital (in front of orbit) fossa (depression in bone) and several minute dental distinctions. Their skulls are low and their muzzles are elongated. Anoplotheriids with adequate postcranial fossil evidence are two-toed (Anoplotherium commune) to three-toed (other taxa like Diplobune and Anoplotherium latipes), the latter trait being unknown among other artiodactyls. Because of the lack of analogues for the limb morphologies and mobilities of anoplotheriids, unusual palaeobiological behaviours have been theorized by researchers, namely bipedalism in Anoplotherium, arboreal locomotion (tree-climbing) from Diplobune, and fossorial (digging) capabilities in Ephelcomenus.

Anoplotheriidae is endemic to western Europe, which was fragmented by oceans into a subtropical to tropical archipelago during the Eocene. This region sustained a diverse array of mammal groups. Dacrytheriines appeared earlier than anoplotheriines and lived from the Middle Eocene to the Late Eocene, whereas Anoplotheriines lived from the Middle Eocene to the Early Oligocene. Following the extinctions of early anoplotheriines, Anoplotherium and Diplobune filled their niches in the Late Eocene. After the Grande Coupure extinction and faunal turnover event, a combination of cooling climates and dispersal of various immigrant faunas to western Europe, the diversity of the Anoplotheriidae was drastically reduced. Only one anoplotheriid species, Diplobune minor, survived into the late Early Oligocene.

== Taxonomy ==
=== Research history ===
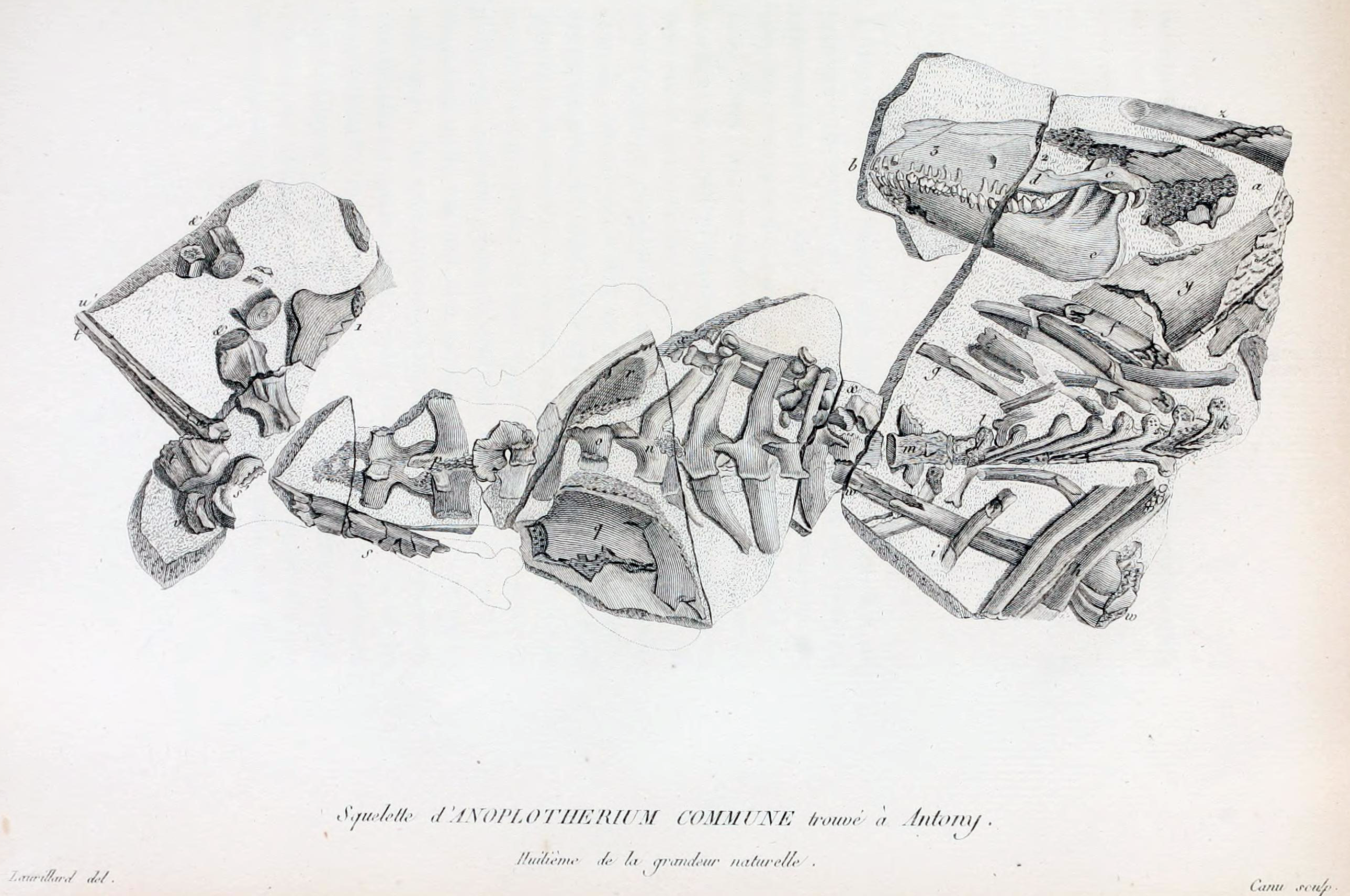
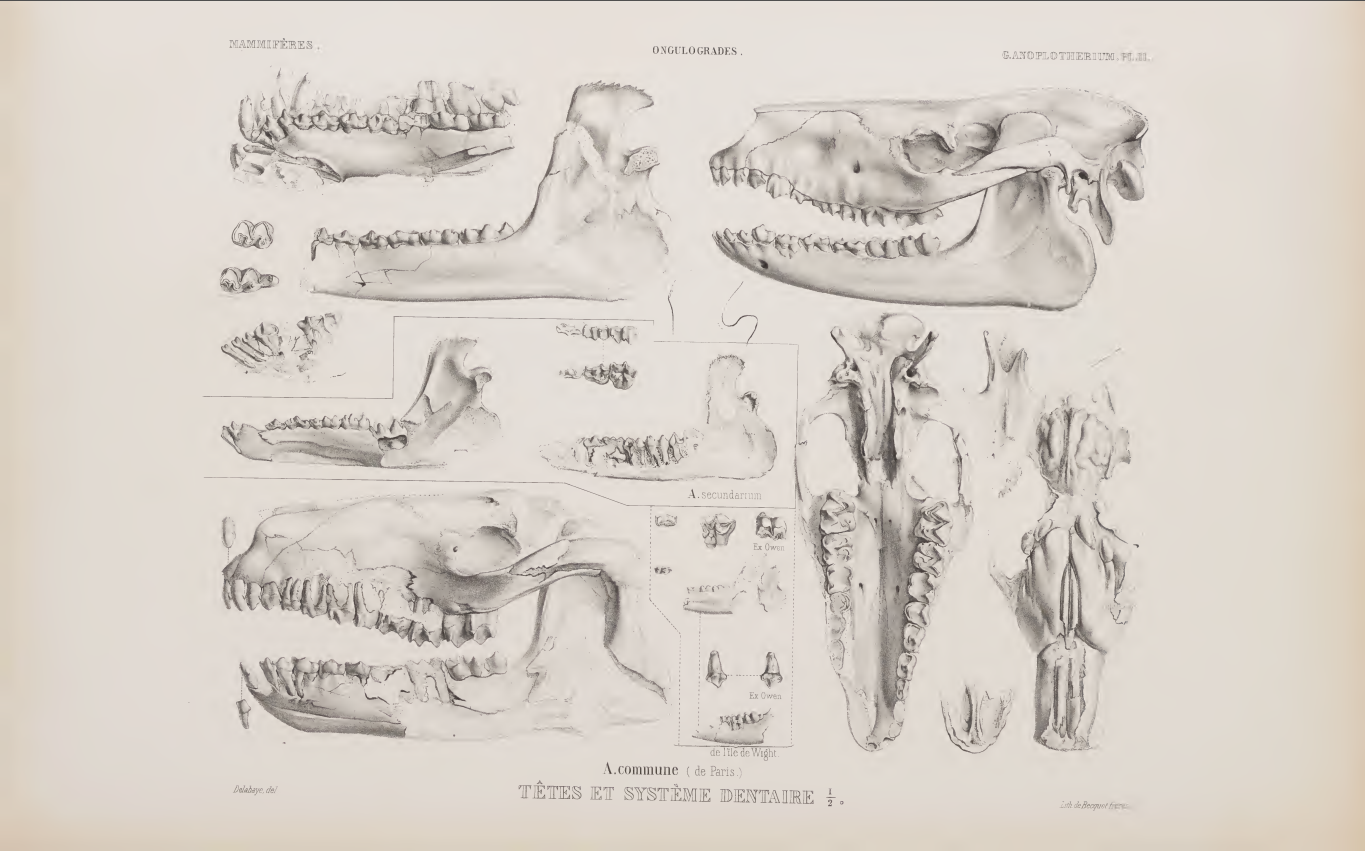
1807 sketches of an Anoplotherium commune skeleton (left) and 1839–1864 illustrations of cranial and dental fossils of A. commune (right)

The taxonomic history of the Anoplotheriidae began as early as 1804 when the French palaeontologist Georges Cuvier erected the genus Anoplotherium based on fossils found at the gypsum quarries at the outskirts of Paris (known as the Paris Basin). The etymology of Anoplotherium derives in Ancient Greek from αν- (an, 'not'), ὅπλον (hóplon, 'armor, large shield'), and θήρ (thēr, 'beast, wild animal') meaning "unarmed beast". He later named several species within Anoplotherium the same year. In 1812, he published a skeletal drawing of A. commune based on the incomplete skeletons he previously studied and speculated on the behaviours of the multiple species he assigned to Anoplotherium including A. commune. In 1821, British zoologist John Edward Gray established the family name "Anoplotheriadæ", providing the taxonomic diagnosis and assigning Anoplotherium as the sole member. He defined the Anoplotheriidae as having two long toes along with six total incisors, four canines, and twenty-eight cheek teeth, none of which are spaced out by diastemata (dental row gaps). In 1822, Cuvier assigned several species of Anoplotherium to its then-recognized subgenera Xiphodon and Dichobune. Because of its palaeontological significance, Anoplotherium became a key figure of 19th-century texts on palaeontology, although its iconicity declined in the 20th century. Several sculptures of A. commune were created by English sculptor Benjamin Waterhouse Hawkins in the Crystal Palace Dinosaurs attraction in the Crystal Palace Park in the United Kingdom, open to the public since 1854. The three sculptures were based on Cuvier's descriptions of the species along with his unpublished reconstructions showing that it was muscular, maintaining a degree of accuracy to the modern day.

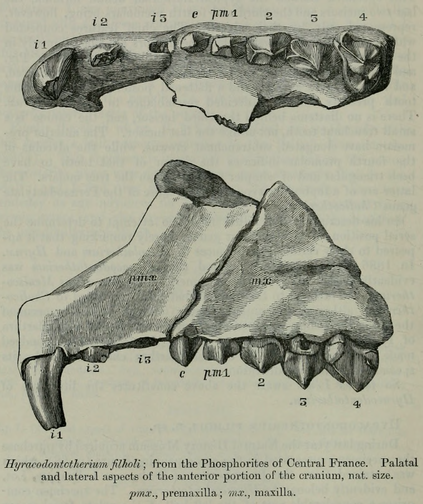
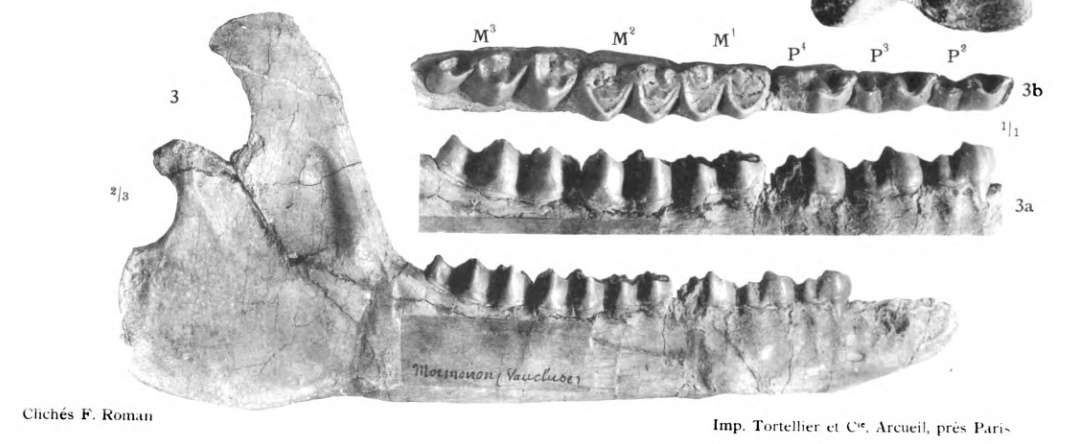
1889 illustration of a partial upper jaw of Ephelcomenus filholi (left) and image of a mandible with dentition of Diplobune secundaria (right)

In 1848, French palaeontologist Auguste Pomel reclassified one Anoplotherium species to Amphimeryx. As written in his two 1848–1852 works, French palaeontologist Paul Gervais treated both Xiphodon and Dichobune as distinct genera from Anoplotherium, thus classifying their respective species outside of Anoplotherium. French naturalist Charles Lucian Bonaparte wrote the family name "Anoplotheriidae" in his taxonomy list dating to 1850. Swiss palaeontologist François Jules Pictet de la Rive erected the clade Anoplothérioides in 1853, defining it as a broad-level clade (more specifically a superfamily). Besides Anoplotherium and "Eurytherium" (since synonymized with the former), he also classified multiple other non-anoplotheriid genera into the clade like Chalicotherium, Dichobune, Adapis, Dichodon, and Merycopotamus. In 1862, Swiss palaeontologist Ludwig Rütimeyer erected a subgenus for Dichobune named Diplobune, suggesting that A. secundarium was a transitional species from Anoplotherium to Dichobune. In response, German palaeontologist Oscar Fraas in 1870 confirmed that Diplobune was a distinct genus with close relations to Anoplotherium but not Dichobune. Following up on higher-level taxa involving Anoplotherium, American mammalogist Theodore Gill in 1872 listed the superfamily name Anoplotherioidea, of which the two family members were the Anoplotheriidae and Dichobunidae; the two genera listed under the former were Anoplotherium and Eurytherium. In 1876, French palaeontologist Henri Filhol erected Dacrytherium while also naming a new species under it. British palaeontologist Richard Lydekker defined the Anoplotheriidae as a family consisting of Xiphodon, Dacrytherium, and Anoplotherium in his 1885 work on artiodactyl taxonomy. In a book dating to 1891–1893, German palaeontologist Karl Alfred von Zittel suggested that there were four total subfamilies within the Anoplotheriidae: the "Anoplotherinae" (the three genera of which he said consisted of Anoplotherium, Diplobune, and Dacrytherium), "Dichobuninae", "Caenotherinae", and "Xiphodontinae".

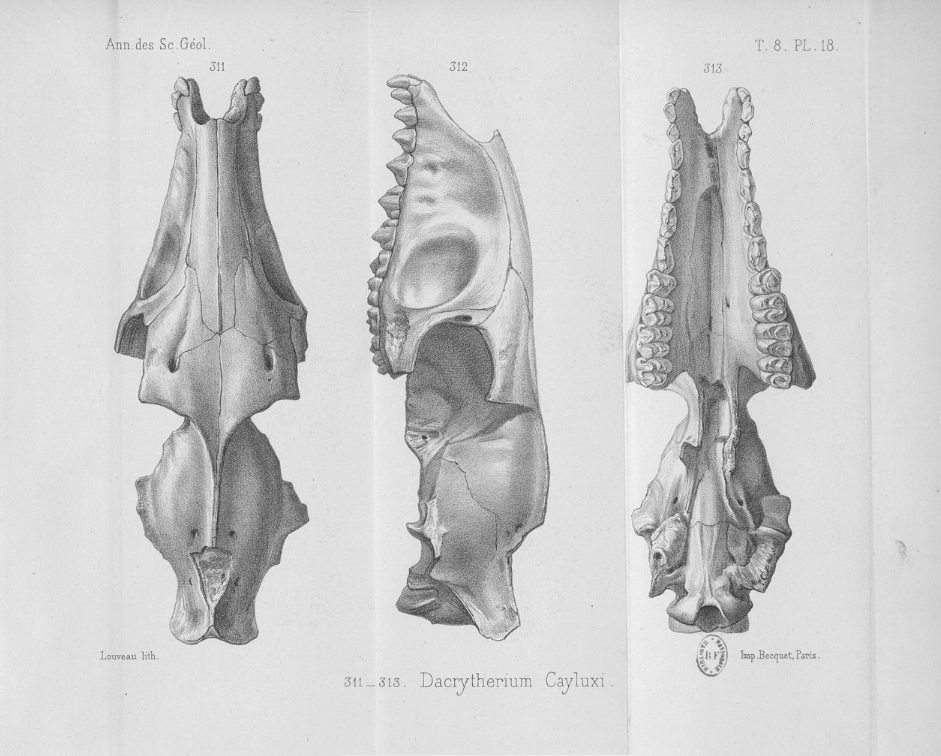
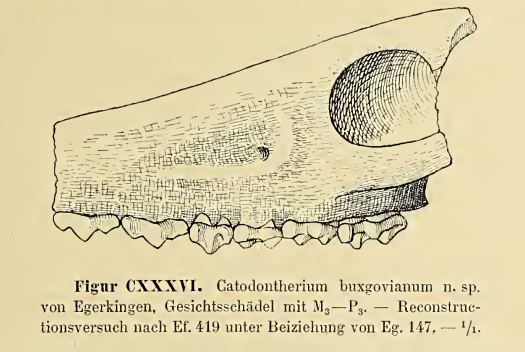
1877 illustration of the cranium of Dacrytherium ovinum (left) and 1910 reconstruction of the partial facial skull of Catodontherium buxgovianum (right)

In 1906, French palaeontologist Charles Depéret erected another genus Catodus, later changing the genus name to Catodontherium in 1908. In 1910, Swiss palaeontologist Hans Georg Stehlin discussed the clade "Anoplotheridae", noting that previous authors used to group under it artiodactyls from the Eocene that had diastemata-free dental rows and premolariform canines. He continued that many of the artiodactyls previously classified under the family cannot continue to be under it because of various other distinct dental characteristics, meaning that the cladistic definition of the family needed to be revised. Thus, Stehlin explained, the family only consisted of Anoplotherium and Diplobune. According to Depéret (1917), the newly established "Dacrythéridés" (or Dacrytheriidae) was closely aligned with Anoplotheriidae and Anthracotheriidae but restricted to only a few genera like Dacrytherium, Catodontherium, and Leptotheridium. In 1938, Swiss palaeontologist Johannes Hürzeler erected another anoplotheriid genus Ephelcomenus. In 1945, American palaeontologist George Gaylord Simpson recognized only the family name Anoplotheriidae, its genera being Anoplotherium, Diplobune, "Hyracodontherium" (since synonymized with Diplobune), Dacrytherium, Catodontherium, Leptotheridium, and Tapirulus.

In a new vein, a 1961 paper by French paleontologist Jean Viret recognized two subfamilies within the Anoplotheriidae: the Anoplotheriinae (Anoplotherium, Diplobune, and Ephelcomenus) and the Dacrytheriinae (Dacrytherium, Catodontherium, Leptotheridium, and Tapirulus). In 1977, French palaeontologist Jean Sudre suggested that Robiacina be classified into its own anoplotheriid subfamily "Robiaciinae", making it one of two subfamilies. He also revived the clade Anoplotherioidea, defining it as a group consisting of the Anoplotheriidae, Dacrytheriidae, and Cainotheriidae. He reaffirmed the validity of the Anoplotherioidea in 1978, considering it to have consisted of the Anoplotheriidae and "Dacrytheryidae"; he also classified Robiacina into the latter subfamily. In 1986, British palaeontologist Jerry J. Hooker agreed with Viret in there being two subfamilies under the Anoplotheriidae. In 1988, Sudre named another anoplotheriine Robiatherium. In two papers involving Hooker dating to 2000 and 2001, he and the papers' respective coauthors (Marc Wedmann and Katherine M. Thomas) further restricted Anoplotheriidae, removing Robiacina and then Tapirulus. In 2009, Spanish palaeontologists Miguel-Ángel Cuesta and Ainara Badiola erected Duerotherium and classified it into the Anoplotheriinae. The higher-level taxonomic placement of Leptotheridium remains in dispute, with authors continuing to classify it into either the Dacrytheriinae or Xiphodontidae.

=== Classification ===
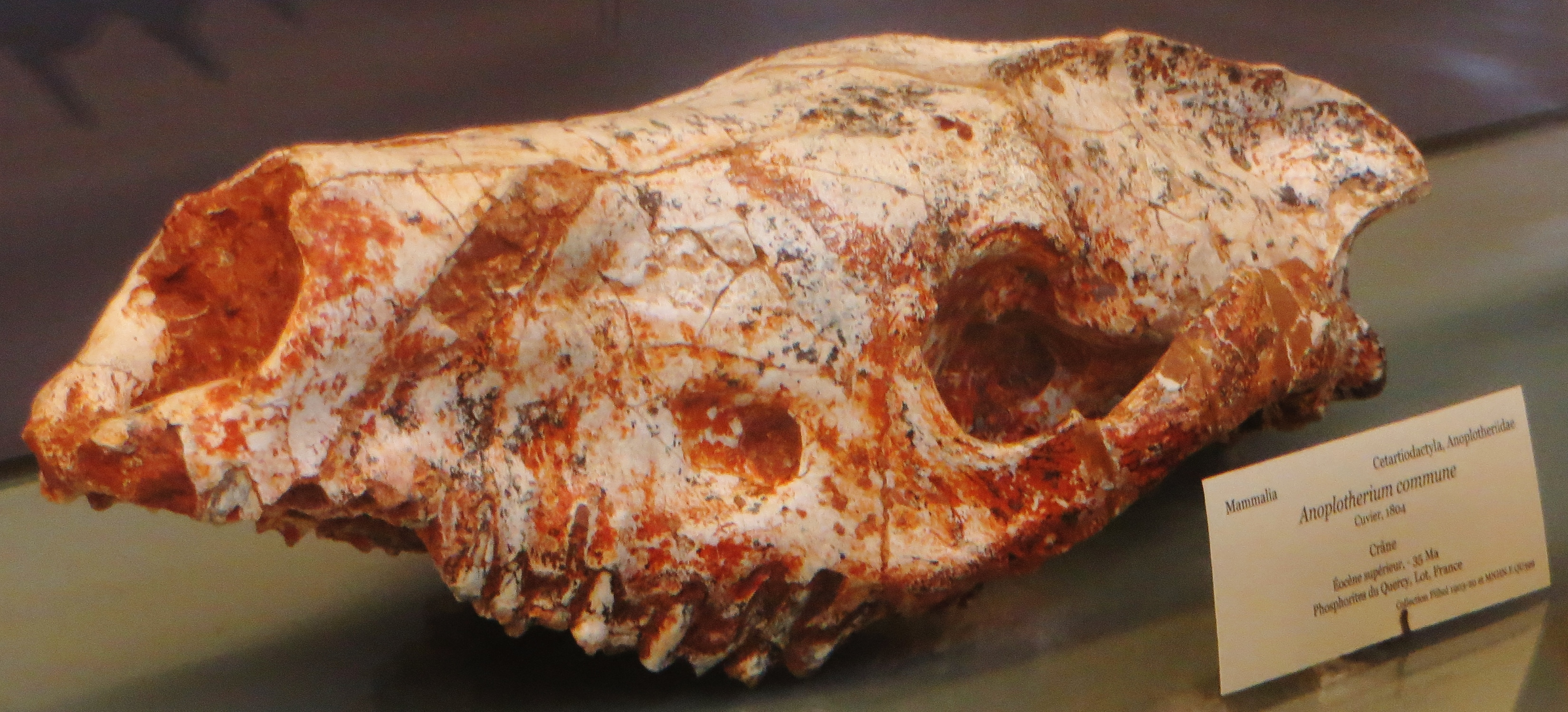
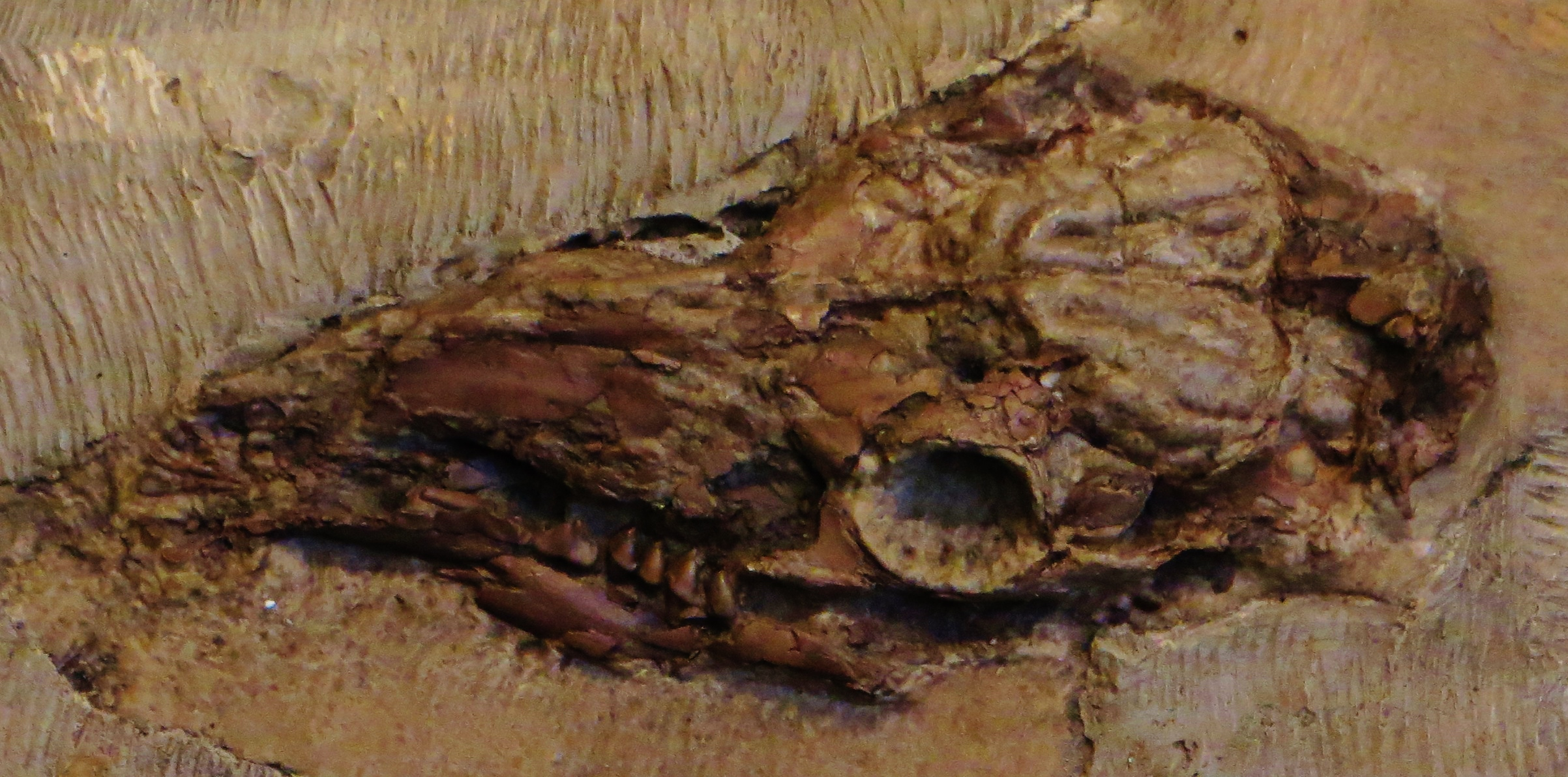
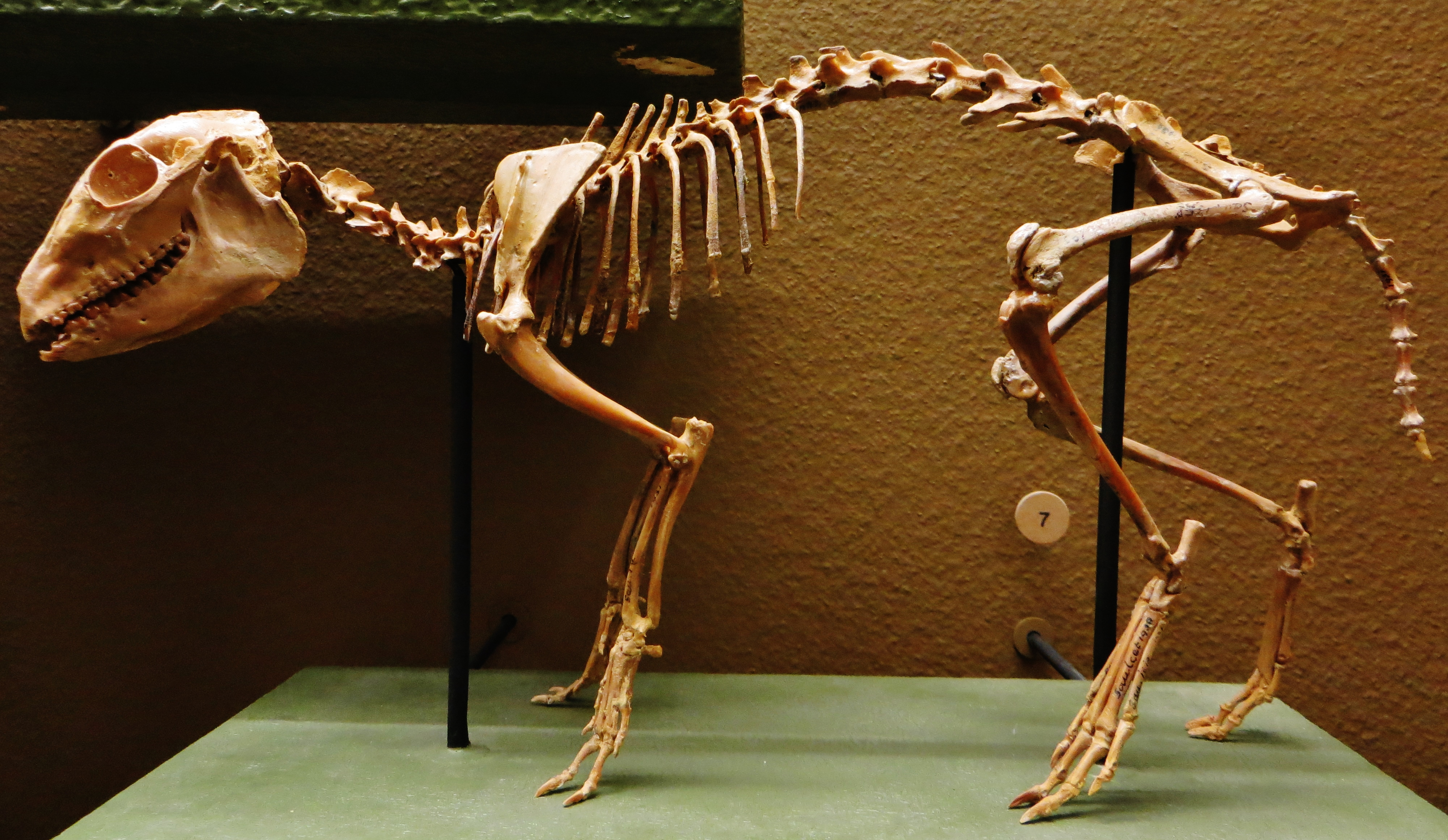
Cranium of Anoplotherium commune at the National Museum of Natural History, France (left). Anoplotheriids have been widely considered to be closest in relation to several other extinct European endemic artiodactyls like the xiphodonts (Xiphodon gracilis, center) and cainotheres (Cainotherium sp., right)

The Anoplotheriidae (referred to as "anoplotheriids" or "anoplotheres") is a family of artiodactyls that was endemic to western Europe and lasted from the later Middle Eocene to the Early Oligocene. The two subfamilies of the Anoplotheriidae are the Anoplotheriinae and the Dacrytheriinae. Informally grouped into the "endemic European artiodactyls" category with other extinct artiodactyls from the region, the broader taxonomic placement of the Anoplotheriidae within the Artiodactyla has and does remain unclear today. Gray in 1821 listed the Anoplotheriidae as closely related to the Hippopotamidae and Suidae (the family which includes pigs) grouping them within the since-invalid clade "Tesserachenae". In 1850, Bonaparte classified the family to the "Belluae" within the order "Ungulata" (since invalid clades, the latter eventually replaced by Euungulata). Pictet classified the Anoplotherioidea as a member of the "Pachydermata" (also since invalid) within Artiodactyla and considered it to have been a transitory group between pachyderms and ruminants as part of his 1853 treatise on paleontology. Lydekker, as part of his 1883 memoir, suggested that the Anoplotheriidae was the sole family of the clade Anoplotherina, classified within the suborder Suina, which also includes pigs and peccaries. Both Lydekker in 1885 and von Zittel, per a book dated to 1891–1893, agreed with the assessments of the Anoplotheriidae being within the Artiodactyla. In instances where the Anoplotheriidae was grouped within a superfamily, it was usually classified into its own called the Anoplotherioidea; it had alternatively been classified within the "Anthracotherioidea" by Viret in 1961. The Anoplotherioidea, whenever used, had also included the Xiphodontidae; Amphimerycidae; Cainotheriidae; and/or, in cases where they were considered a separate family, the Dacrytheriidae. For his 2022 thesis, Weppe considered dacrytheriines to be a subfamily of the Anoplotheriidae and the Cainotheriidae to be part of its own superfamily called the Cainotherioidea. He rejected the validity of the Anoplotherioidea as traditionally defined by previous authors because of cladistic results showing the polyphyly (grouping of evolutionarily unrelated taxa) of the Anoplotheriidae-Xiphodontidae grouping.

Conducting studies focused on the phylogenetic relations within the Anoplotheriidae has proven difficult due to the general scarcity of fossil specimens of most genera. The phylogenetic relations of the Anoplotheriidae as well as the other extinct artiodactyl families Xiphodontidae, Mixtotheriidae, and Cainotheriidae have also been elusive due to the selenodont morphologies (or having crescent-shaped ridges) of the molars, which were convergent with tylopods or ruminants. Some researchers considered the selenodont families Anoplotheriidae (represented below by Anoplotherium and Dacrytherium), Xiphodontidae, and Cainotheriidae to be within Tylopoda due to postcranial features that were similar to the tylopods from North America in the Palaeogene. Other researchers tie them as being more closely related to ruminants than tylopods based on dental morphology. Different phylogenetic analyses have produced different results for the evolutionarily "derived" (of newer traits) selenodont Eocene European artiodactyl families, making it uncertain whether they were closer to the Tylopoda or Ruminantia. In a 2020 phylogenetic analysis, Vincent Luccisano and colleagues recovered Anoplotheriidae in a greater clade of bunoselenodont endemic European artiodactyls including the Amphimerycidae and Xiphodontidae; the authors determined that it was also part of a smaller clade that was the sister group to the Ruminantia, namely the Cainotheriidae, Robiacinidae, Anoplotheriidae, and Mixtotheriidae. The phylogenetic tree published in the article and another work about the cainotherioids is outlined below:

- - Eurodexis russelli
  - Dichobune leporina
  - - - Amphimeryx murinus
      - - Xiphodon castrense
        - Tylopoda
          - Paratoceras coatesi
          - Eotylopus reedi
    - - Ruminantia
        - Parvitragulus priscus
        - - Lophiomeryx chalaniati
          - Archaeomeryx optatus
      - - Mixtotheriidae
          Mixtotherium cuspidatum
        - Anoplotheriidae
          - Anoplotherium latipes
          - Dacrytherium ovinum
        - Cainotherioidea
          - Robiacinidae
            - Robiacina lavergnesis
            - - Robiacina minuta
              - Robiacina quercyi
          - Cainotheriidae
            - Palembertina deplasi
            - - Oxacroninae
                - Paroxacron bergeri
                - - Paroxacron valdense
                  - Oxacron courtoisii
              - Cainotheriinae
                - Cainotherium laticurvatum
                - - Caenomeryx
                    - Caenomeryx filholi
                    - Caenomeryx procommunis
                  - Plesiomeryx
                    - Plesiomeryx cadurcensis
                    - Plesiomeryx huerzeleri

In 2020, Vincent Luccisano and colleagues created a phylogenetic tree of the basal artiodactyls, a majority endemic to western Europe, from the Palaeogene. In one clade, the "bunoselenodont endemic European" Mixtotheriidae, Anoplotheriidae, Xiphodontidae, Amphimerycidae, Cainotheriidae, and Robiacinidae are grouped together with the Ruminantia. The phylogenetic tree as produced by the authors is shown below:

- Artiodactyla
  - Bunophorus
  - - Gunophorus
    - Diacodexis
  - - - Protodichobune
      - Eurodexis
    - - - Buxobune
        - - Mouillacitherium
          - Meniscodon
        - - - Hyperdichobune
            - - Dichobune robertiana
              - - Dichobune leporina
                - - Homacodon
                  - - Gobiohyus
                    - Suina
                      - - Khirtharia
                        - Entelodon
                      - - Palaeocheorus
                        - Perchoerus
          - - Haplobunodontidae
              - Haplobunodon
              - - Cuisitherium
                - Lophiobunodon
            - - Mixtotherium
              - - Robiacina
                - - - - Dacrytherium
                      - Diplobune
                    - - Xiphodon
                      - Paraxiphodon
                  - - - Cainotherium
                      - Paroxacron
                    - - Archaeomeryx
                      - - Amphimeryx
                        - Pseudamphimeryx
      - - Aumelasia
        - - - Hallebune
            - Amphirhagatherium
          - - Cebochoeridae
              - Cebochoerus
              - Gervachoerus
            - - Choeropotamus
              - Siamotherium

In 2022, Weppe created a phylogenetic analysis in his academic thesis regarding Palaeogene artiodactyl lineages. The phylogenetic tree is the first to conduct phylogenetic affinities of all anoplotheriid genera, although not all individual species were included. He found that the Anoplotheriidae, Mixtotheriidae, and Cainotherioidea form a clade based on synapomorphic dental traits (traits thought to have originated from their most recent common ancestor). The result matches up with previous phylogenetic analyses on the Cainotherioidea with other endemic European Palaeogene artiodactyls that support the families as a clade but does not find Anoplotherioidea, as defined by earlier sources to exclude several of the families, recovered. The grouping, he emphasized, was part of a broader monophyletic clade of selenodont (crescent-shaped ridges on cheek teeth) and bunoselenodont (bunodont (rounded cusps on cheek teeth) plus selenodont) artiodactyls that also include the Hyperdichobuninae and Amphimerycidae (the former paraphyletic (of a group not including all descendants) in relation to the other clades). He also suggested that the dacrytheriines clade, which included Dacrytherium, Catodontherium, and Leptotheridium, was paraphyletic while the anoplotheriines clade showed unambiguous evidence of it being the more evolutionarily derived anoplotheriid subfamily.

== Description ==
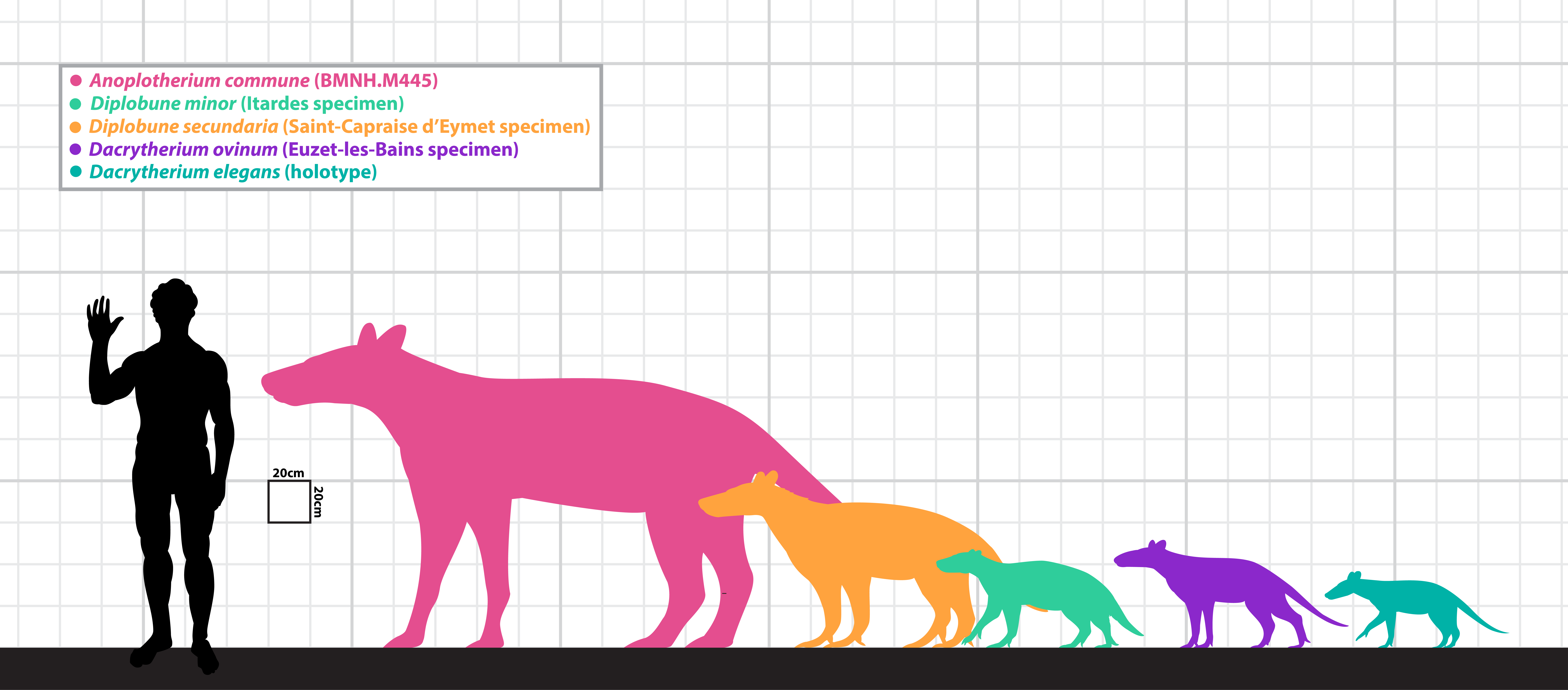
Estimated size comparisons of several species of anoplotheriids, namely Anoplotherium commune; Diplobune secundaria; Diplobune minor; Dacrytherium ovinum; and Dacrytherium elegans, based on known fossil remains

Anoplotheriids ranged from relatively medium to large sizes, but only anoplotheriines have reached large sizes. A 1995 study by Jean-Noël Martinez and Sudre estimated the weights of several anoplotheriids using astragali; Dacrytherium weighed 13.187 kg (29.07 lb), while Anoplotherium weighed 265.967 kg (586.36 lb) (only Anthracotherium exceeded the estimated weight of Anoplotherium, with Ant. magnum weighing 405.779 kg (894.59 lb)). The dental formula of the Anoplotheriidae is 3.1.4.33.1.4.3 for a total of 44 teeth (22 top and bottom each), consistent with the primitive dental formula for early-middle Palaeogene placental mammals. Anoplotheriids have bunoselenodont to semi-selenodont dentition. The dental row is usually "continuous", meaning the row of teeth are not interrupted by diastemata, but such gaps between teeth are sometimes present between front teeth. Anoplotheriids have selenodont or bunoselenodont (teeth with bunodont and selenodont cusps) premolars (P/p) and molars (M/m) for leaf-browsing diets. The canines (C/c) of the Anoplotheriidae are overall undifferentiated from the incisors (I/i). The lower premolars of the family are piercing and elongated. The upper molars are bunoselenodont while the lower molars have selenodont labial (front in relation to mouth exterior) cuspids (cusps of lower teeth) and bunodont (or rounded) lingual cuspids. The upper molars have prominent, isolated, and conical-shaped protocone cusps on them that are positioned in submedian to median positions and are aligned with the mesostyle cusps (the last trait of which is especially prominent in the third upper molar, or M^{3}). The protoconule cusp is simple and non-crescentiform and is connected to the parastyle cusp by a ridge whereas the metaconule cusp is more subcrescentiform. Both the paracone and metacone cusps are connected by sharp ridges to the parastylar and mesostylar ridges, forming a W-shaped ectoloph (crests or ridges of upper molar teeth).

While anoplotheriines generally lack or have small diastemata present, dacrytheriines typically bear a varying degree of diastemata present on the anterior (front) portions of their dental rows. The upper molars of dacrytheriines have a centred, conical-shaped, and lingual protocone cusp along with a subconical paraconule that is connected to the parastyle cusp and a metaconule that is crescent-shaped. The premolars are moderately molarized and have a crescent-shaped paraconule. Anoplotheriines differ from dacrytheriines by the lack of both molariform upper premolars with crescent-shaped paraconules and the lower molars with a third cusp between the metaconid and entoconid cusps. Unlike in other anoplotheriids, I^{1} of Ephelcomenus is tusk-shaped and elongated and its I^{2} is reduced in form. Catodontherium argentonicum has notably bunodont (or rounded) molars compared to later species of Catodontherium and Dacrytherium.

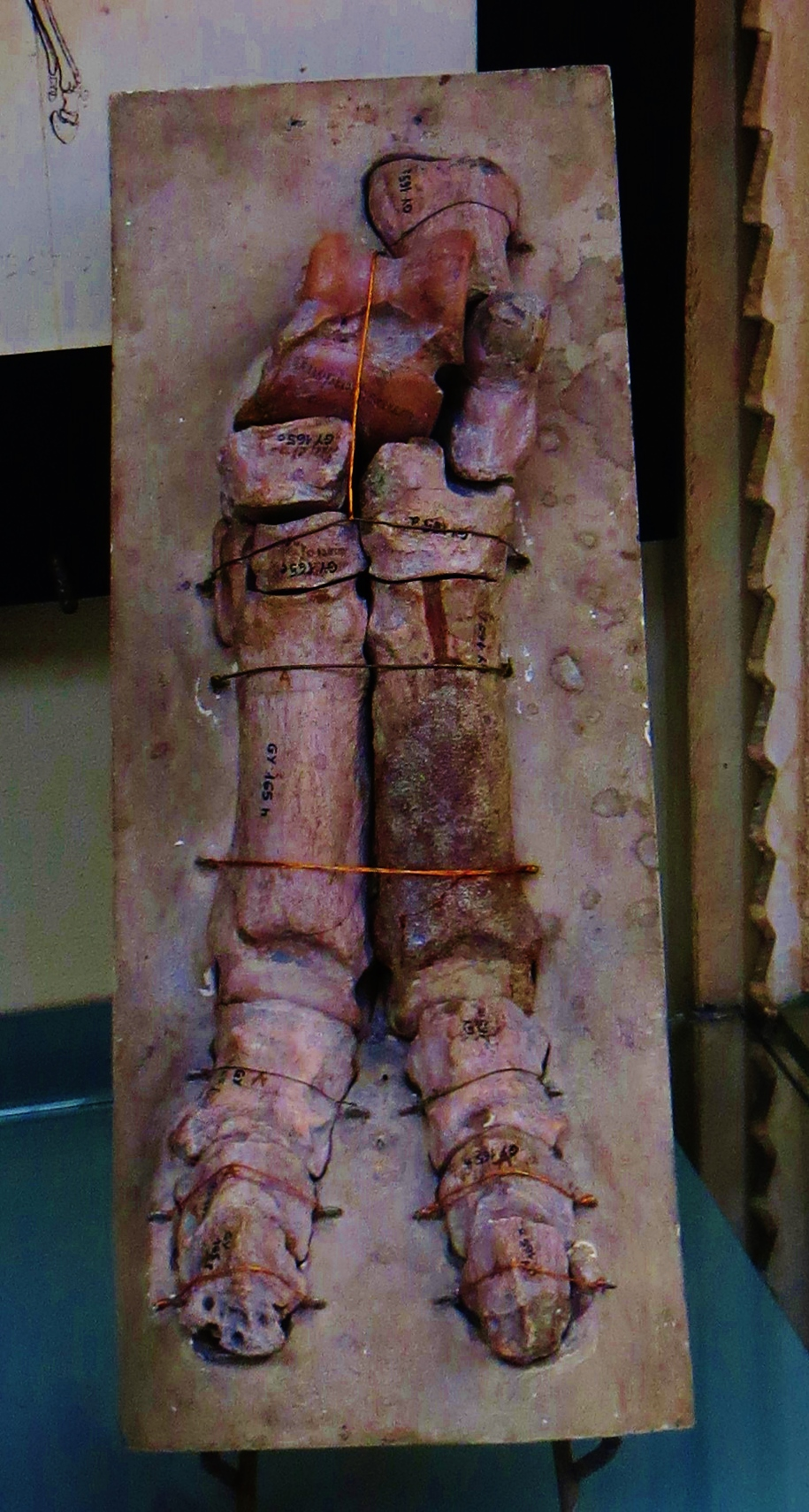
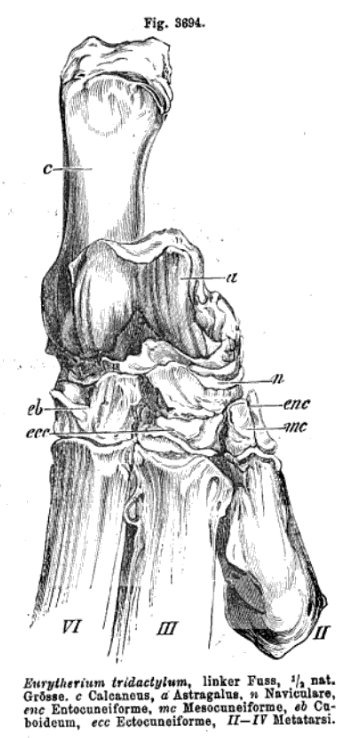
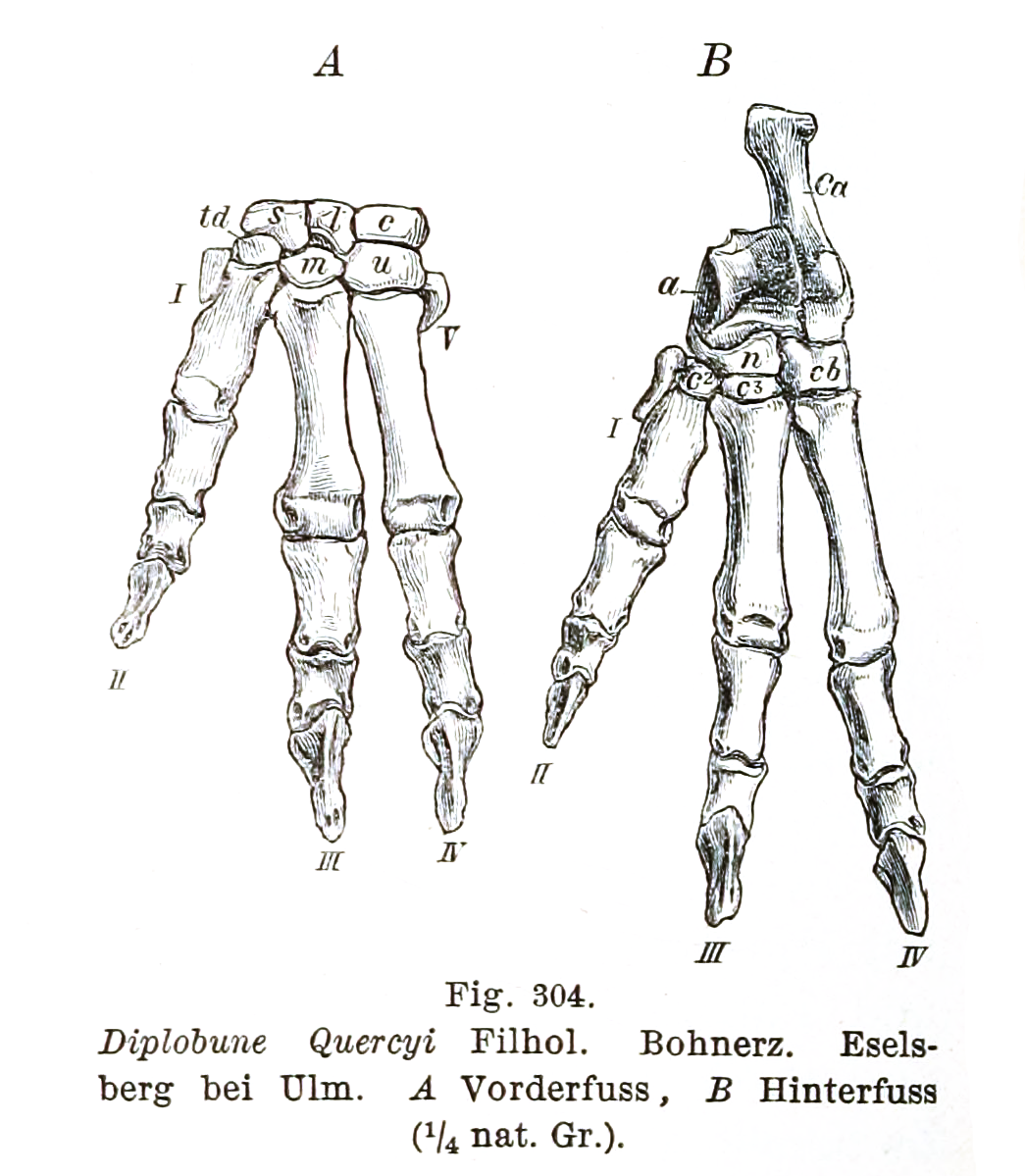
Foot bones of Anoplotherium commune from the National Museum of Natural History, France (left), A. latipes (center), and Diplobune quercyi (right)

Anoplotheriids have somewhat similar resemblances to that of camels (Camelus) in terms of cranial anatomy, the main difference being that anoplotheriids have shorter muzzles. Despite this, anoplotheriids still have elongated muzzles and lower skulls. The paroccipital process as seen in anoplotheriids is large and formed from the mastoid and exoccipital bones. The orbits of anoplotheriids are wide open from behind. The overall morphologies of the skulls of Anoplotherium, Diplobune, and Dacrytherium are all very similar to each other, the key differences being based on specialized anatomical traits. Anoplotherium in particular has a large, robust skull with much more well-developed muscle crests. Many cranial traits observed in Anoplotherium are also found in its close relative Diplobune, such as the glenoid (or hollow) surface being high in relation to the base of skull unlike Dacrytherium, a narrow occiput (back of the skull) that is enhanced just above the occipital condyles, and two small occipital buns for muscle attachment. In addition, both Anoplotherium and Diplobune have transversely nearly flat upper skull sides from the parietal bones of the skull's back to the front area of the nasals and the orbits being above corresponding M^{2} teeth. The two anoplotheriine genera also have large nasals. Dacrytheriines differ from anoplotheriines in the presences of preorbital fossae on them, although their developments are more well-marked in Dacrytherium than in Catodontherium. Unlike other anoplotheriids, which lack them, Dacrytherium has large lacrimal fossae in front of its orbits. Anoplotherium, Diplobune, and Dacrytherium are all also known from brain endocasts.

The carpal, tarsal, and metapodial bones are all distinct from each other. Anoplotheriids are either didactyl (two-toed) in the case of Anoplotherium commune or tridactyl (three-toed) in the cases of Diplobune, Catodontherium, and other Anoplotherium species; in the case of the latter number of digits, the two lateral digits are shorter than the middle digit and are angled in positions. The tridactyl feet in several anoplotheriids are a unique feature unseen in other artiodactyls. The terminal (or distal (farthest from centre)) phalanx bone is generally sharp and clawlike. Anoplotheriids have robust and relatively large scapulas and humeri and divergent digit II at the tarsus, both traits of which are noted as "postcranial peculiarities" among artiodactyls. Their elbow joints are highly mobile, especially in between the radius and ulna. The distal joint of the humerus is shaped in a matter that allows for high mobility between the radius and humerus. Anoplotherium in particular has been known by many postcranial bones including several skeletons and has a robust anatomy and a long tail. Large-sized footprints from Spain and France that are designated to the ichnogenus Anoplotheriipus and represent three ichnospecies total are described as round to rectangular in shape with broad and anteriorly-pronounced cloven digit imprints resembling poorly-made camel tracks. They are thought to have been made by species of Anoplotherium like A. commune and A. latipes.

== Palaeobiology ==
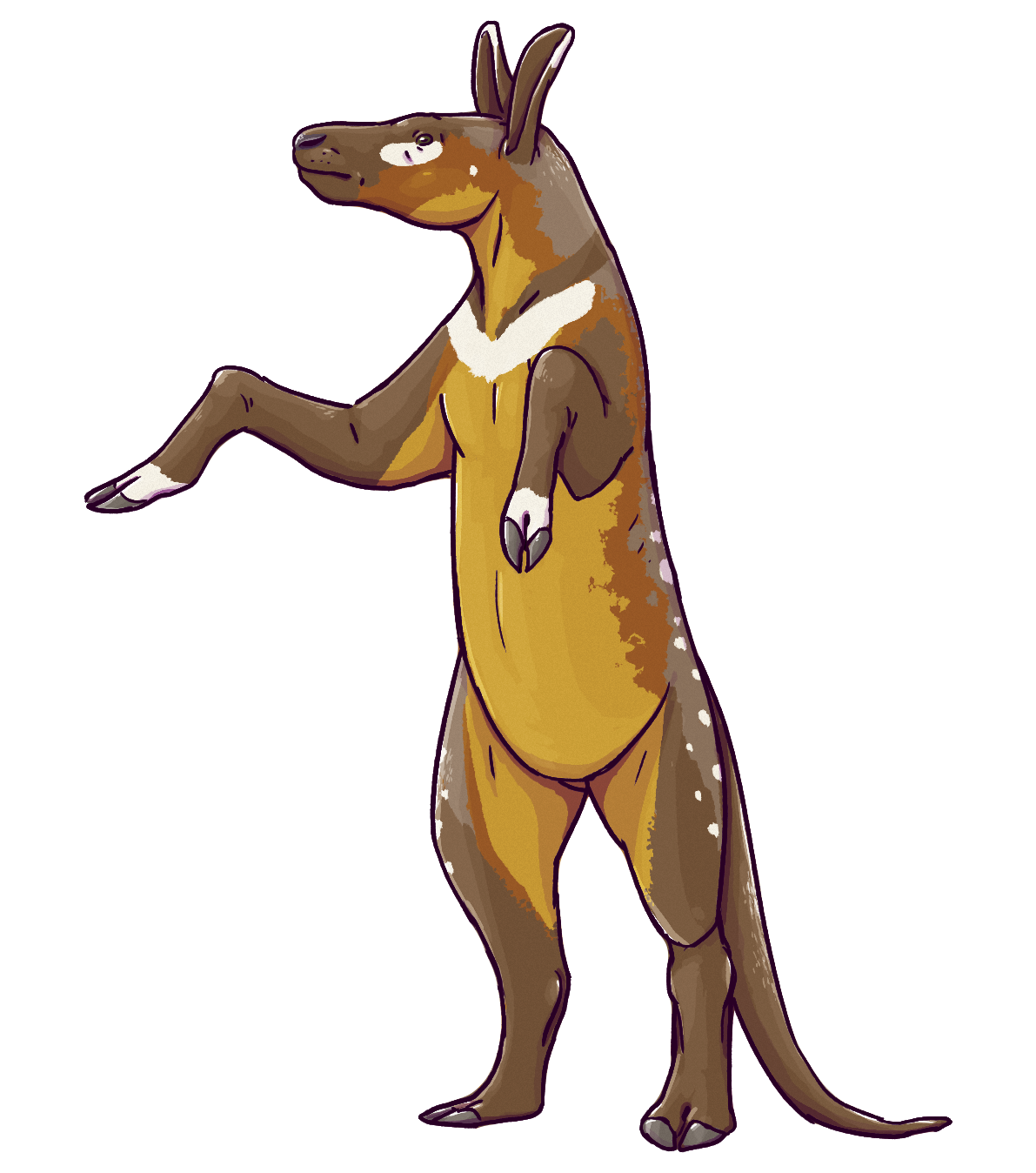
Life restoration of Anoplotherium commune in a bipedal position

Anoplotheriids like Anoplotherium and Diplobune have unusual postcranial anatomies that have led researchers to conclude that they have no modern analogues, even among other artiodactyls. The palaeobiologies of anoplotheriids remain uncertain, especially due to dearth of dacrytheriine postcranial remains. Several anoplotheriines like Anoplotherium and Diplobune are better-represented by postcranial evidence generally. Hypotheses for anoplotheriid paleobiologies have been proposed as early as 1812, when Cuvier drew a skeletal illustration of Anoplotherium and speculated that it was a capable aquatic swimmer. This hypothesis was accepted by other palaeontologists until 1938, when M. Dor rejected the theory because of anatomical differences from otters and hippopotamuses that were more consistent with terrestrial movements than semi-aquatic ones. Since then, the consensus among 21st century researchers has been that anoplotheriids were not semi-aquatic.

Although there are few preserved postcranial fossils of dacrytheriines, a 1986 paper by Hooker hypothesized that Dacrytherium was a ground dweller. Anoplotheriines have had speculations of unusual behaviours based on their unique anatomies. Anoplotherium is thought to have been an unguligrade quadruped that was able to stand on its hind legs (bipedalism), an adaptation also reflected in other extant and extinct quadrupeds like chalicotheres, ground sloths, and the gerenuk (Litocranius walleri). While in bipedalism, the neck and head could have stayed horizontally positioned, the front feet could have been utilized for balance, and the strong pelvis and the long and robust tail could have let it stand on its hind legs. Anoplotherium, already the largest endemic European artiodactyl and among the largest mammals of western Europe at the time of its existence, would have only faced equivalent size competition from Palaeotherium magnum, which shows no capability of bipedalism. Adult Anoplotherium latipes for instance may have measured 2.5 m (8 ft 2 in) in total length and 1.25 m (4 ft 1 in) in shoulder height, potentially attaining 3 m (9.8 ft) in height when standing bipedally. The groupings of Anoplotheriipus tracks in Spain suggest that Anoplotherium commonly walked in small groups and engaged in gregarious (social) behaviours.

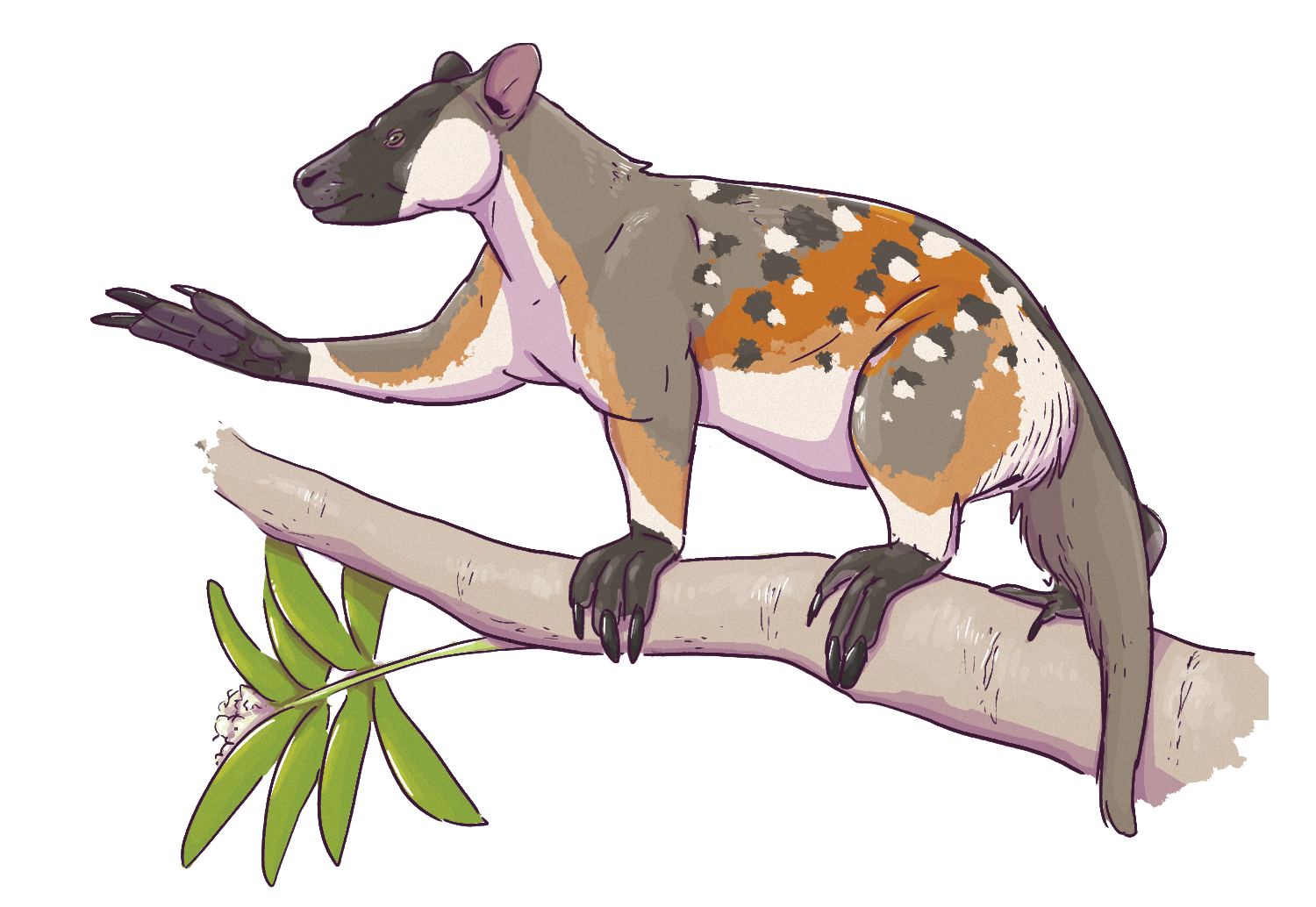
Life restoration of Diplobune minor moving on a tree branch

Diplobune is primarily thought to have been capable of arboreal locomotion (movement between trees). It could have capable of climbing in trees by grappling on them, especially using its manus' second finger. The forelimb morphologies of Diplobune suggest that it was able to make lateralized (side-to-side) movements of the forelimb, which would have allowed pronation, or rotational movement, of the forearm and flexed positions from the knee to the hind limb. Researchers Cyril Gagnaison and Jean-Jacques Leroux speculated that D. secundaria probably lived a more solitary lifestyle. D. minor may have had slow movements based on the morphologies of the ear and limbs, although the extent of its slowness is uncertain. Similarly, Ephelcomenus had high elbow mobility based on the morphology of the joints. The morphologies of both the elbow bones and phalanges of Ephelcomenus appear to imply specialized fossorial abilities like in pangolins of the genus Manis, meaning that it could have been specialized for burrowing.

Both anoplotheriid subfamilies are thought to have belonged to the selenodont dentition group of endemic European Palaeogene artiodactyls, meaning that they were likely folivorous (leaf-eating) browsers. Because D. secundaria possibly had a tapered tongue, it may have been able to use it to pull branches from plants like giraffids do. Its massive, low, and lophoselenodont molars could have allowed for it to consume harder plants due to its dentition being able to tear through abrasive plant material like leaves. A study on both Diplobune and Plagiolophus demonstrated that the two contemporaneous genera consumed increasingly rough plant material during the Eocene-Oligocene transition, although the former remained purely folivorous and therefore never consumed fruit. Fossorial behaviours could have meant that Ephelcomenus' diet consisted of ground food, such as rhizomes, bulbs, and roots, and other ground plant material.

== Palaeoecology ==
=== Middle Eocene ===
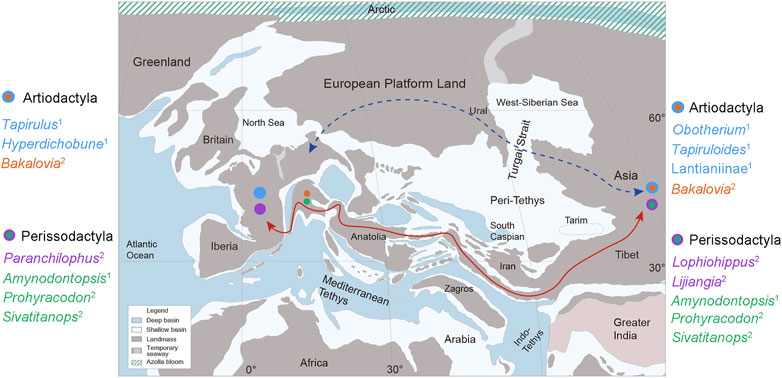
Palaeogeography of Europe and Asia during the Middle Eocene with possible artiodactyl and perissodactyl dispersal routes

For much of the Eocene, a hothouse climate with humid, tropical environments with consistently high precipitations prevailed. Modern mammalian orders including the Perissodactyla, Artiodactyla, and Primates (or the suborder Euprimates) appeared already by the Early Eocene, diversifying rapidly and developing dentitions specialized for folivory. The omnivorous forms mostly either switched to folivorous diets or went extinct by the Middle Eocene (47–37 million years ago) along with the archaic "condylarths". By the Late Eocene (approx. 37–33 mya), most of the ungulate form dentitions shifted from bunodont (or rounded) cusps to cutting ridges (i.e. lophs) for folivorous diets.

Land connections between western Europe and North America were interrupted around 53 Ma. From the Early Eocene up until the Grande Coupure extinction event (56–33.9 mya), western Eurasia was separated into three landmasses: western Europe (an archipelago), Balkanatolia (in-between the Paratethys Sea of the north and the Neotethys Ocean of the south), and eastern Eurasia. The Holarctic mammalian faunas of western Europe were therefore mostly isolated from other landmasses including Greenland, Africa, and eastern Eurasia, allowing for endemism to develop. Therefore, the European mammals of the Late Eocene (MP17–MP20 of the Mammal Palaeogene zones) were mostly descendants of endemic middle Eocene groups.

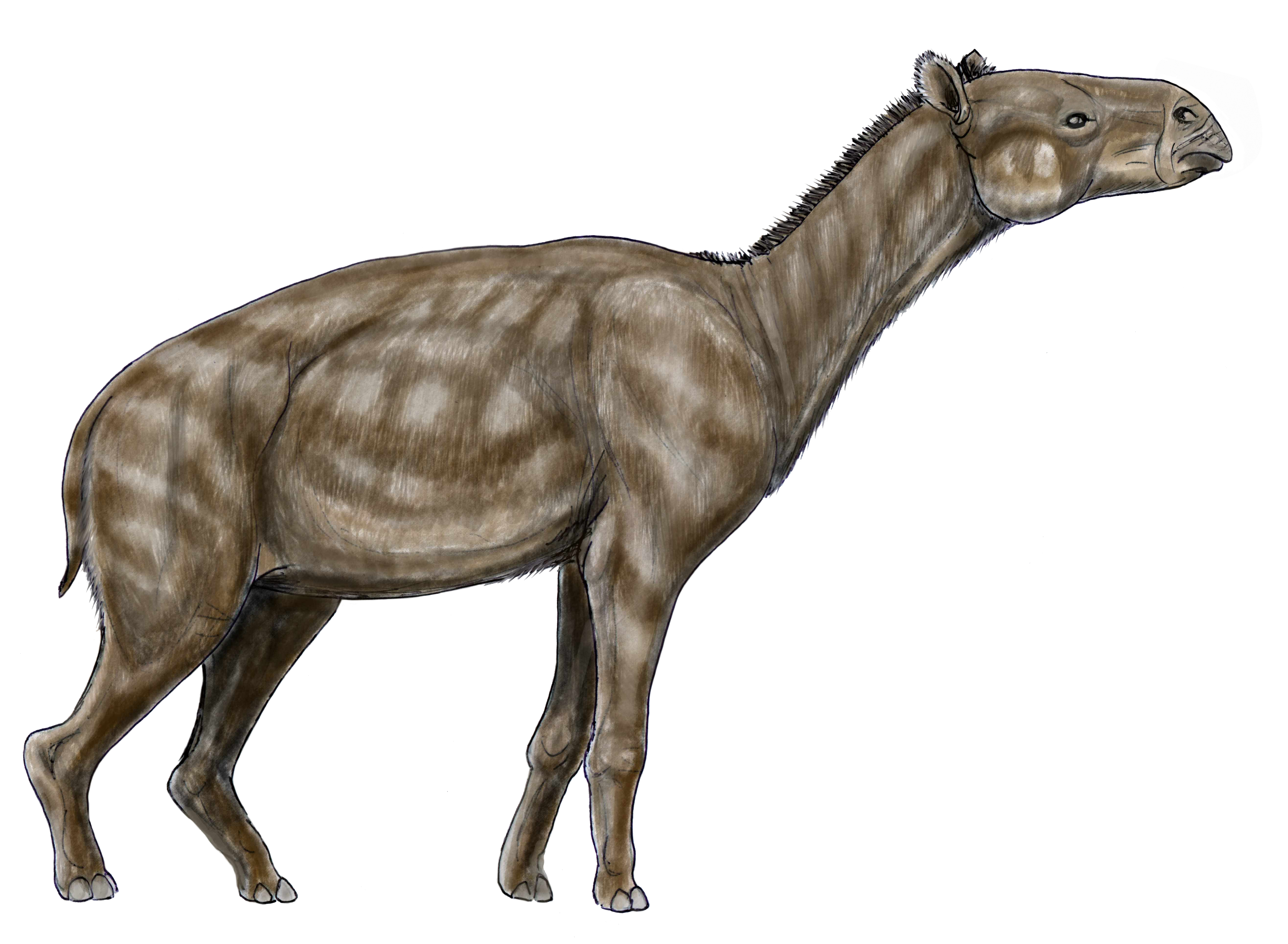
Restoration of Palaeotherium, which coexisted with anoplotheriids in the Middle Eocene to Early Oligocene

For the entirety of its existence, the Anoplotheriidae remained endemic to western Europe. The temporal ranges of most anoplotheriid genera are well-recorded, although that of Ephelcomenus is unclear. The possibly earliest record of anoplotheriids is Catodontherium argentonicum by MP11. The earliest undisputed anoplotheriid species to have been recorded was Dacrytherium cf. elegans in MP13 followed by Catodontherium buxgovianum and Catodontherium fallax in MP14, thus making the Dacrytheriinae the earlier anoplotheriid subfamily. By MP14, anoplotheriids overlapped temporally and geographically with perissodactyls (Palaeotheriidae, Lophiodontidae, and Hyrachyidae), non-endemic artiodactyls (Dichobunidae and Tapirulidae), endemic European artiodactyls (Choeropotamidae, Cebochoeridae, Mixtotheriidae, and other members of Anoplotheriidae), and primates (Adapidae). Both the Amphimerycidae and Xiphodontidae made their appearances by the level MP14. Their stratigraphic ranges indicate that they also coexisted with metatherians (Herpetotheriidae), cimolestans (Pantolestidae, Paroxyclaenidae), rodents (Ischyromyidae, Theridomyoidea, Gliridae), eulipotyphlans (Nyctitheriidae), bats, apatotherians, carnivoraformes (Miacidae), and hyaenodonts (Hyainailourinae, Proviverrinae). Other MP13-MP14 sites have also yielded fossils of turtles and crocodylomorphs, and MP13 sites are stratigraphically the latest to have yielded remains of the Gastornithidae and Palaeognathae. Duerotherium sudrei, an anoplotheriine and the only species of its genus, is recorded in an MP15–MP16 locality while Robiatherium cournovense (representative of a monospecific genus), Catodontherium robiacense (the latest species of its genus), and Dacrytherium elegans are known from sites dating to MP16.

By MP16, a faunal turnover occurred, marking the disappearances of the lophiodonts and European hyrachyids as well as the extinctions of all European crocodylomorphs except for the alligatoroid Diplocynodon. The causes of the faunal turnover have been attributed to a shift from humid and highly tropical environments to drier and more temperate forests with open areas and more abrasive vegetation. The surviving herbivorous faunas shifted their dentitions and dietary strategies accordingly to adapt to abrasive and seasonal vegetation. The environments were still subhumid and full of subtropical evergreen forests, however. The Palaeotheriidae was the sole remaining European perissodactyl group, and frugivorous-folivorous or purely folivorous artiodactyls became the dominant group in western Europe.

=== Late Eocene and Early Oligocene ===
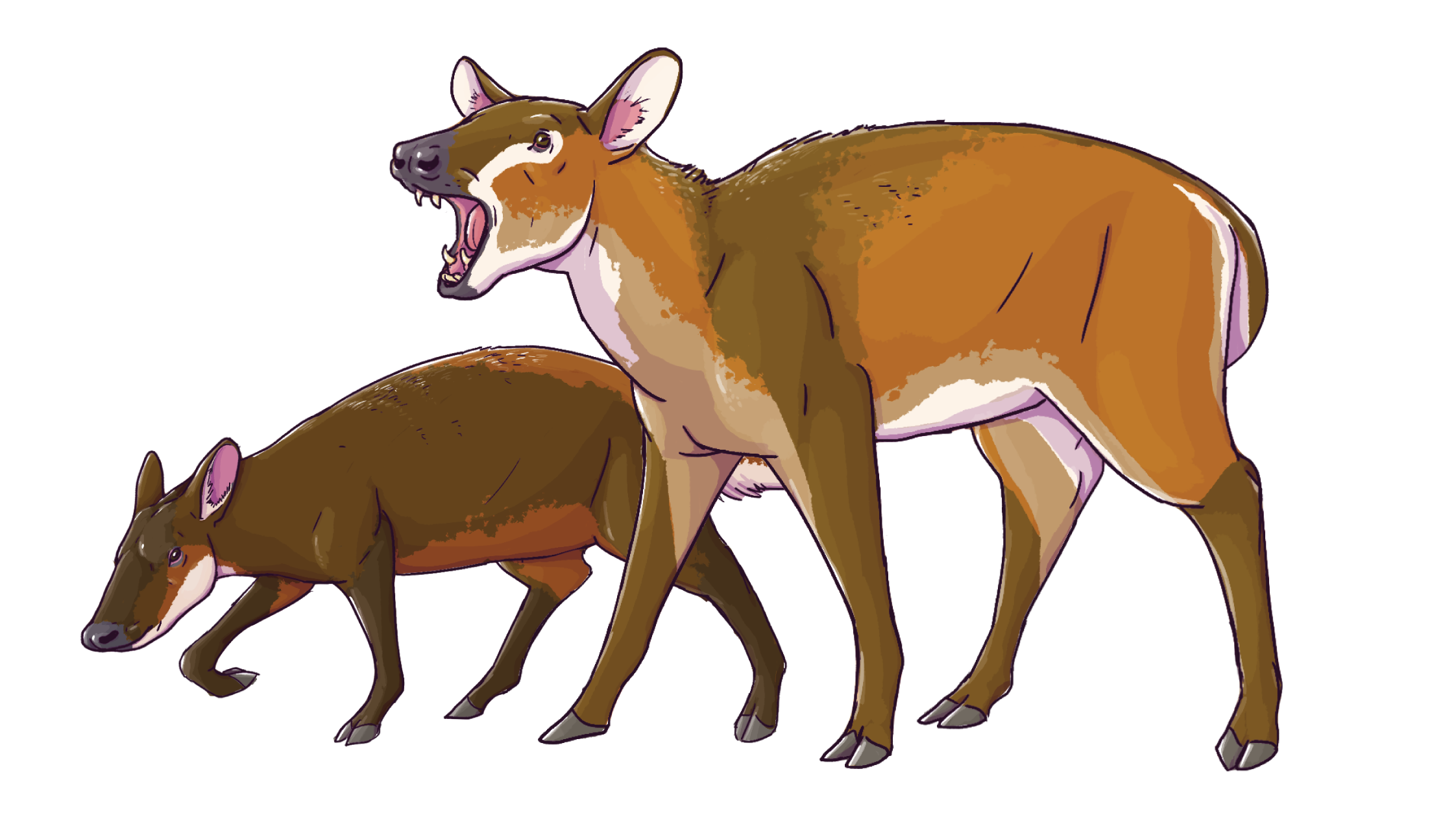
Bachitherium, a namesake arrival of the Bachitherium Dispersal Event, which occurred long after the Grande Coupure faunal turnover event

By the Late Eocene, Dacrytherium was the only remaining dacrytheriine and was represented by D. ovinum and D. saturnini, which appeared from MP17a to MP18 and from MP17b to MP19, respectively. Two of the latest anoplotheriine genera, Anoplotherium and Diplobune, first appeared in MP18. Both A. commune and A. latipes lasted from MP18 up to MP21; A. laurillardi and A. pompeckji from MP18 to MP20 and from MP19 to MP21, respectively. D. secundaria and D. quercyi have temporal ranges lasting from MP18 to MP20 and from MP19 to MP21, respectively. The anoplotheriids of the Late Eocene coexisted with, in addition to many other endemic faunas, several migrant mammal groups had reached western Europe by MP17a-MP18, namely the Anthracotheriidae, Hyaenodontinae, and Amphicyonidae. They also coexisted with the Cainotheriidae, which first appeared at MP18.

MP20, the last unit before the Grande Coupure extinction and faunal turnover event in western Europe, marks the last appearances of several anoplotheriid species. Many other artiodactyl genera along with other mammal genera from western Europe also went extinct as a result of the Grande Coupure. The causes of the extinctions of many other mammals in western Europe have been attributed to negative interactions with immigrant faunas (competition, predations), environmental changes from cooling climates, or some combination of the two. According to Jerry J. Hooker, the MP21 locality of Möhren 19 in southern Germany, where A. commune and D. quercyi are both recorded, represent brief snapshots of surviving faunas during the Grande Coupure before being replaced by immigrant faunas, including marking the eventual extinction of Anoplotherium. The earliest Oligocene marked the arrivals of later anthracotheres, entelodonts, ruminants (Gelocidae, Lophiomerycidae), rhinocerotoids (Rhinocerotidae, Amynodontidae, Eggysodontidae), carnivorans (later Amphicyonidae, Amphicynodontidae, Nimravidae, and Ursidae), eastern Eurasian rodents (Eomyidae, Cricetidae, and Castoridae), and eulipotyphlans (Erinaceidae).

The Early Oligocene marked a period of long-term drastic cooling global climates, although western Eurasia was still dominated by humid climates with dry seasons and tropical to temperate forests. The last known anoplotheriid species to have existed was D. minor, which was found in localities ranging collectively from MP22 to MP23. By MP23, a faunal event called the Bachitherium Dispersal Event occurred, in which ruminants and rodents from eastern Europe and Asia dispersed to western Europe.
