= Ephelcomenus =

Ephelcomenus Temporal range: Paleogene (stratigraphic range uncertain)

Scientific classification
- Kingdom: Animalia
- Phylum: Chordata
- Class: Mammalia
- Order: Artiodactyla
- Family: †Anoplotheriidae
- Subfamily: †Anoplotheriinae
- Genus: †Ephelcomenus; Hürzeler, 1938
- Species: †E. filholi

Binomial name
- †Ephelcomenus filholi (Lydekker, 1889)

Synonyms
- Hyracodontherium filholi Lydekker, 1889

Extinct genus of endemic Palaeogene European artiodactyls

Ephelcomenus is an extinct genus of Palaeogene artiodactyls belonging to the Anoplotheriidae that were endemic to Western Europe. It contains one species E. filholi, which was first described by Richard Lydekker in 1889 but eventually classified to its own genus by the Swiss palaeontologist Johannes Hürzeler in 1938. It has an uncertain stratigraphic range, but some sources suggest that it was present in the Oligocene after the Grande Coupure turnover event of western Europe.

Ephelconemus has several unusual traits compared to other anoplotheriids, such as an elongated and tusk-shaped first upper incisor and a hollow first phalanx. The latter trait, along with the typical flexible limb morphologies of anoplotheriids, led Hürzeler to hypothesize that it was specialized for fossorial behaviors, meaning that it may have burrowed and eaten grounded plant material. The hypothesis has not been tested, but other members of the subfamily Anoplotheriinae such as Anoplotherium and Diplobune are also suggested to have unusual adaptations as well. It was larger in size compared to other anoplotheriines except for Anoplotherium and most species of Diplobune and likely inhabited forested environments.

== Taxonomy ==
In 1938, Swiss palaeontologist Johannes Hürzeler wrote about an artiodactyl that he observed was from the middle Stampien (= Rupelian). He reviewed species classified to the anoplotheriid genus Hyracodontherium, previously erected by Henri Filhol in 1877. Among them, he stated that the type species H. primaevum belonged to the genus Diplobune, effectively making Hyracodontherium a synonym of Diplobune. He also stated that he was unsure about the validity of H. crassum. Hürzeler also established that H. filholi, erected previously by Richard Lydekker in 1889, was not a species of Diplobune based on dental and postcranial differences. As a result of the taxonomic changes, he erected the genus Ephelcomenus for the reclassified species E. filholi. Ephelcomenus is derived from the Greek word "Εφελκόμενος", meaning "latecomer", and is a reference to Hürzeler's suggestion that Ephemcomenus itself was an evolutionary "latecomer" of its family group.

=== Classification ===
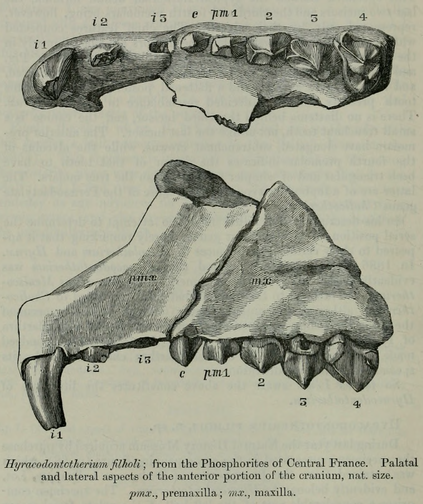
Upper jaw and dentition of "Hyracodontherium filholi" (= Ephelcomenus filholi). The upper jaw was referenced by Johannes Hürzeler in 1938.

Ephelcomenus belongs to the Anoplotheriidae, a Palaeogene artiodactyl family endemic to western Europe that lived from the middle Eocene to the early Oligocene (~44 to 30 Ma, possible earliest record at ~48 Ma). The exact evolutionary origins and dispersals of the anoplotheriids are uncertain, but they exclusively resided within the continent when it was an archipelago that was isolated by seaway barriers from other regions such as Balkanatolia and the rest of eastern Eurasia. The Anoplotheriidae's relations with other members of the Artiodactyla are not well-resolved, with some determining it to be either a tylopod (which includes camelids and merycoidodonts of the Palaeogene) or a close relative to the infraorder and some others believing that it may have been closer to the Ruminantia (which includes tragulids and other close Palaeogene relatives).

The Anoplotheriidae consists of two subfamilies, the Dacrytheriinae and Anoplotheriinae, the latter of which is the subfamily that Ephelcomenus belongs to. The Dacrytheriinae is the older subfamily of the two that first appeared in the middle Eocene (since the Mammal Palaeogene zones unit MP13, possibly up to MP10), although some authors consider them to be a separate family in the form of the Dacrytheriidae. Anoplotheriines made their first appearances by the late Eocene (MP15–MP16), or ~41–40 Ma, within western Europe with Duerotherium and Robiatherium. After a significant gap of anoplotheriines in MP17a–MP17b, the derived anoplotheriids Anoplotherium and Diplobune made their first appearances in western Europe by MP18, although their exact origins are unknown.

Ephelcomenus is not known by common remains compared to other anoplotheriids, so its stratigraphic range is poorly known. It is suggested that Ephelcomenus may have been present in the middle Oligocene of western Europe, which if true would have meant that it extended far past the Grande Coupure extinction event.

Conducting studies focused on the phylogenetic relations within the Anoplotheriidae has proven difficult due to the general scarcity of fossil specimens of most genera. The phylogenetic relations of the Anoplotheriidae as well as the Xiphodontidae, Mixtotheriidae, and Cainotheriidae have also been elusive due to the selenodont morphologies of the molars, which were convergent with tylopods or ruminants. Some researchers considered the selenodont families Anoplotheriidae, Xiphodontidae, and Cainotheriidae to be within Tylopoda due to postcranial features that were similar to the tylopods from North America in the Palaeogene. Other researchers tie them as being more closely related to ruminants than tylopods based on dental morphology. Different phylogenetic analyses have produced different results for the "derived" selenodont Eocene European artiodactyl families, making it uncertain whether they were closer to the Tylopoda or Ruminantia.

In an article published in 2019, Romain Weppe et al. conducted a phylogenetic analysis on the Cainotherioidea within the Artiodactyla based on mandibular and dental characteristics, specifically in terms of relationships with artiodactyls of the Palaeogene. The results retrieved that the superfamily was closely related to the Mixtotheriidae and Anoplotheriidae. They determined that the Cainotheriidae, Robiacinidae, Anoplotheriidae (represented below by Anoplotherium and Dacrytherium), and Mixtotheriidae formed a clade that was the sister group to the Ruminantia while Tylopoda, along with the Amphimerycidae and Xiphodontidae split earlier in the tree. The phylogenetic tree published in the article and another work about the cainotherioids is outlined below:

- - Eurodexis russelli
  - Dichobune leporina
  - - - Amphimeryx murinus
      - - Xiphodon castrense
        - Tylopoda
          - Paratoceras coatesi
          - Eotylopus reedi
    - - Ruminantia
        - Parvitragulus priscus
        - - Lophiomeryx chalaniati
          - Archaeomeryx optatus
      - - Mixtotheriidae
          Mixtotherium cuspidatum
        - Anoplotheriidae
          - Anoplotherium latipes
          - Dacrytherium ovinum
        - Cainotherioidea
          - Robiacinidae
            - Robiacina lavergnesis
            - - Robiacina minuta
              - Robiacina quercyi
          - Cainotheriidae
            - Palembertina deplasi
            - - Oxacroninae
                - Paroxacron bergeri
                - - Paroxacron valdense
                  - Oxacron courtoisii
              - Cainotheriinae
                - Cainotherium laticurvatum
                - - Caenomeryx
                    - Caenomeryx filholi
                    - Caenomeryx procommunis
                  - Plesiomeryx
                    - Plesiomeryx cadurcensis
                    - Plesiomeryx huerzeleri

In 2022, Weppe created a phylogenetic analysis in his academic thesis regarding Palaeogene artiodactyl lineages, focusing most specifically on the endemic European families. The phylogenetic tree, according to Weppe, is the first to conduct phylogenetic affinities of all anoplotheriid genera, although not all individual species were included. He found that the Anoplotheriidae, Mixtotheriidae, and Cainotherioidea form a clade based on synapomorphic dental traits (traits thought to have originated from their most recent common ancestor). The result, Weppe mentioned, matches up with previous phylogenetic analyses on the Cainotherioidea with other endemic European Palaeogene artiodactyls that support the families as a clade. As a result, he argued that the proposed superfamily Anoplotherioidea, composing of the Anoplotheriidae and Xiphodontidae as proposed by Alan W. Gentry and Hooker in 1988, is invalid due to the polyphyly of the lineages in the phylogenetic analysis. However, the Xiphodontidae was still found to compose part of a wider clade with the three other groups. He said that Ephelcomenus, Duerotherium, and Robiatherium compose a clade of the Anoplotheriidae.

== Description ==
=== Skull and dentition ===
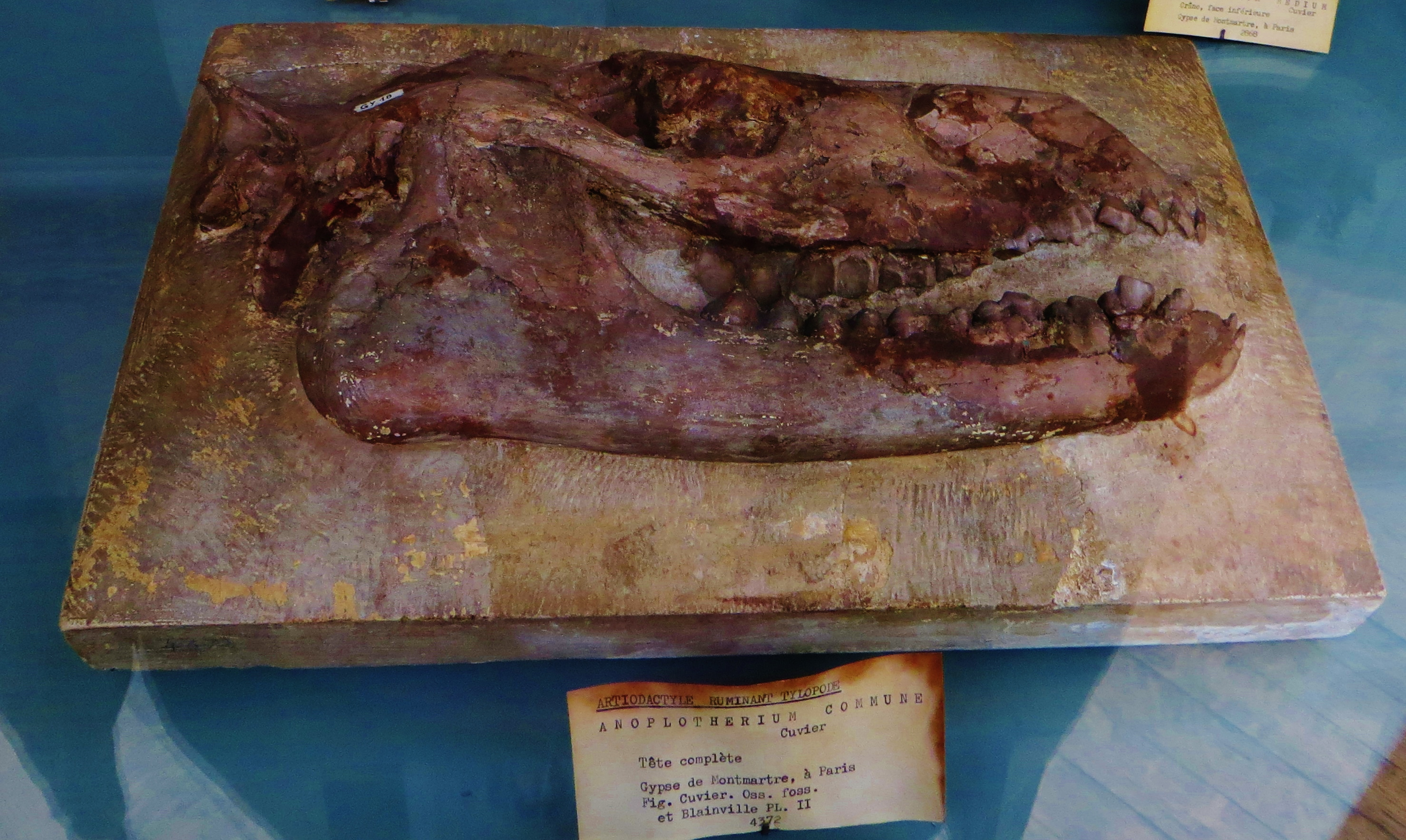
Skull of the related Anoplotherium commune, National Museum of Natural History, France

Unlike Anoplotherium and Diplobune, Ephelcomenus is known only by a few fragmentary cranial remains, including some mandibular remains. The mandible is diagnosed as rapidly increasing in height by the rear end, which Jean Viret in 1961 cited to be a trait differing it from Anoplotherium and Diplobune. However, the mandible of Diplobune is also observed to have increased in height in the back area.

The dental formula of the Anoplotheriidae is 3.1.4.33.1.4.3 for a total of 44 teeth, consistent with the primitive dental formula for early-middle Palaeogene placental mammals. Anoplotheriids have selenodont (crescent-shaped ridge form) or bunoselenodont (bunodont (or rounded) and selenodont (crescent-shaped ridge form)) premolars (P/p) and molars (M/m) made for leaf-browsing diets. The canines (C/c) of the Anoplotheriidae are overall undifferentiated from the incisors (I/i). The lower premolars of the family are piercing and elongated. The upper molars are bunoselenodont in form while the lower molars have selenodont labial cuspids and bunodont lingual cuspids. The subfamily Anoplotheriinae differs from the Dacrytheriinae by the lack of both molariform upper premolars with crescent-shaped paraconules and the lower molars with a third cusp between the metaconid and entoconid.

An unusual trait of Ephelcomenus is the prominently elongated and tusk-shaped I^{1} (first upper incisor). The I^{2} is seemingly reduced in comparison. The upper premolars are short, stocky, and simple in comparison. The upper molars are also short but increase in size from M^{1} to M^{3}. The M^{1} and M^{2} is subtriangular in outline while that of M^{3} is triangular, resulting from the reduction of the metaconule cusp and different position of the metaconule cusp. The protocone cusp of the upper molars of Ephelcomenus is larger and more centrally positioned compared to those of other anoplotheriids.

The lower premolars are also short broad in shape compared to those of Diplobune. P_{2} is shorter than P_{1} whereas P_{4} is shorter and weaker than P_{3}. The lower molars are similarly short and have sharp crescent shapes. There is currently no fossil evidence of mandibular front teeth of Ephelcomenus.

Gérard de Beaumont in 1963 cast doubt that one dental remains specimen attributed to Ephelcomenus filholi really belongs to the species, explaining that the M^{3} tooth was too small compared to the expected size of the tooth of the anoplotheriid species. He felt that the tooth should be classified elsewhere but did not further elaborate where it should be reclassified to.

=== Limbs ===
Hürzeler described postcranial remains attributed to one individual that was collected from the French commune of Saint-André, Pyrénées-Orientales and held in a University of Lyon collection, namely a distal end of a right humerus, a first phalanx, and proximal ends of a radius and ulna.

The palaeontologist was unable to observe what little remained of the diaphysis of the humerus, but he was able to tell that it lacked any entepicondylar foramen. The transverse diameter of the bone is about equivalent in size to that of the humerus of Diplobune from Ulm, Germany. Ephelcomenus differs from Diplobune by a less lengthy capitulum of the humerus and a longer trochlea of the humerus. Diplobune minor differs from Ephelcomenus also by a much deeper trochlea. As a result, the distal end of the humerus of Ephelcomenus is more slender compared to that of Diplobune.

The proximal end of the radius is divided into a circular and concave middle area and two side areas adjacent to the middle area that bend away at an angle. While the two side pieces of Diplobune are about the same size as each other, the lateral piece of the radius' distal end of Ephelcomenus is larger than the medial piece. The articular circumference of the head of the radius of Ephelcomenus is smaller and less evenly curved than that of Diplobune. The radius is similar to that of Diplobune by the long and slender radius of the diaphysis plus constant sagittal diameter. The front area of the diaphysis has a clear and short edge for attachments to flexible muscles. The ulna of Ephelcomenus does not show significant differences from that of Diplobune.

The first phalanx of Ephelcomenus is slightly less wide but significantly shorter than that of Diplobune. Hürzeler speculated that the phalanx may have belonged to the front foot of the anoplothere. Notably, the phalanx is heavily hollowed in its proximal end, with a deep opening in the "metapodial keel" and a deep groove resulting from the open distal articular surface.

=== Size ===
Ephelcomenus does not have any direct size or weight estimate, but Miguel-Ángel Cuesta and Ainara Badiola discussed size comparisons of anoplotheriines. They said that Ephelcomenus would have been larger than Robiatherium and Duerotherium but smaller than Anoplotherium and Diplobune (except for D. minor, which would have similar in size to Duerotherium).

== Palaeobiology ==
The anatomies of anoplotheriids have no modern analogues with respect to other artiodactyls due to unusual postcranial morphologies. They are known by highly mobile elbow joints and specialized humerus morphologies allowing for flexible motions between the humerus and radius. Modern-day hypotheses range from arborealism in the case of Diplobune to bipedalism in the case of Anoplotherium.

Ephelcomenus similarly has a high elbow mobility and similar morphology of the humerus to those of carnivorans. The unusual morphologies of both the first phalanx and elbow joint led Hürzeler to believe that its behaviours were significantly different from those of other anoplotheres. He suggested that Ephelcomenus may have had habits similar to fossorial animals such as pangolins of the genus Manis, meaning that it could have been specialized for burrowing. Its nails may served to excavate burrows, although very little of its skeleton is known. Jean Sudre in 1982 suggested that if the hypothesis is true, it could have fed on food extracted from the ground, such as rhizomes, bulbs, and roots, and other grounded plant material. He also said that Diplobune minor would not have had burrowing behaviours even if it had similar phalanx morphologies on the grounds that lengths and arrangements of digits III and IV reflect more use of balance movements such as arborealism. It likely lived in forested environments similar to Diplobune.

== Palaeoecology ==
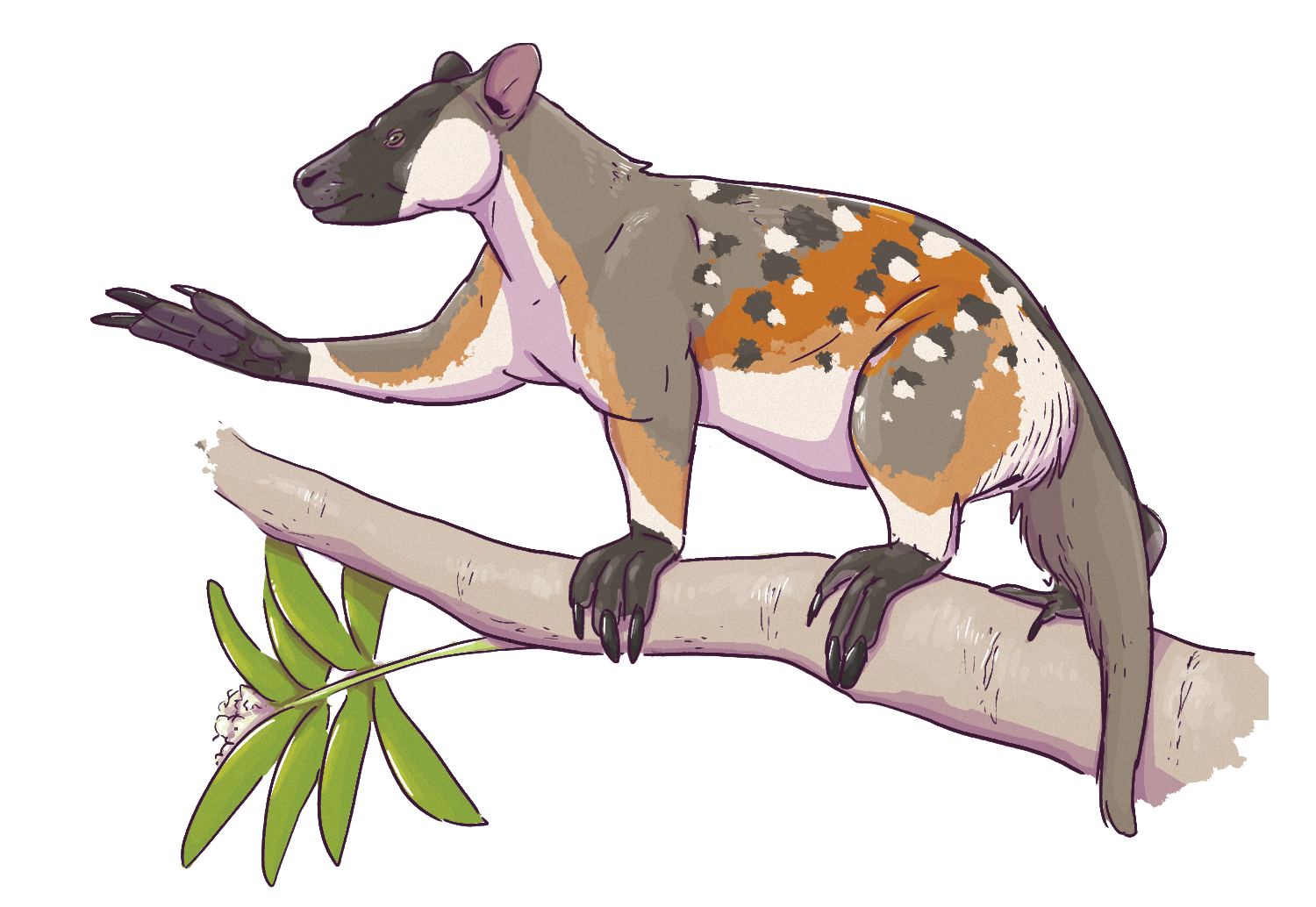
Diplobune species such as D. minor (pictured) were present in the late Eocene and early Oligocene of western Europe

The exact stratigraphic range of Ephelcomenus, while clearly within the Palaeogene period, remains uncertain. The Eocene environmental trends and faunal assemblages of western Europe differed dramatically from those of the continent in the Oligocene due to warmer and subtropical climates plus strong levels of endemism given the isolation of western Europe as an archipelago from other landmasses by the early Eocene. The Anoplotheriidae, which Ephelcomenus belongs to, was one of the European artiodactyl groups endemic to Europe. In his thesis, Weppe suggested that the stratigraphic range of Ephelcomenus may have been at ~MP16.

If Ephelcomenus was present in western Europe during the middle Eocene-earliest Oligocene prior to the Grande Coupure extinction/turnover event, that means that it would have likely been present with a wide variety of other artiodactyls, namely those of endemic families (i.e. Choeropotamidae, Cebochoeridae, Mixtotheriidae, Xiphodontidae, Cainotheriidae, and other members of Anoplotheriidae) and more widespread families (Dichobunidae, Tapirulidae, and Anthracotheriidae). It also likely could have coexisted with other mammals such as the Perissodactyla (Palaeotheriidae), Primates (Adapoidea and Omomyoidea), Hyaenodonta (Hyaenodontinae, Hyainailourinae, and Proviverrinae), Carnivoramorpha (Miacidae), Carnivora (small-sized Amphicyonidae), and endemic rodents (Pseudosciuridae, Theridomyidae, and Gliridae).

If the anoplotheriid genus either survived past the Grande Coupure or was exclusive to the Oligocene, it would have coexisted with post-Grande Coupure survivors as well as non-endemic immigrant faunas originating from eastern Eurasia. Examples of immigrant faunas include later anthracotheres, ruminants (Gelocidae, Lophiomerycidae, and Bachitheriidae), rhinocerotoids (Rhinocerotidae, Amynodontidae, and Eggysodontidae), carnivorans (Nimravidae, Ursidae and later Amphicyonidae), eastern Eurasian rodents (Eomyidae, Cricetidae, and Castoridae), and eulipotyphlans (Erinaceidae).
