= Robiatherium =

Robiatherium Temporal range: Middle Eocene 40–37 Ma

Scientific classification
- Kingdom: Animalia
- Phylum: Chordata
- Class: Mammalia
- Order: Artiodactyla
- Family: †Anoplotheriidae
- Subfamily: †Anoplotheriinae
- Genus: †Robiatherium; Sudre, 1988
- Species: †R. cournovense

Binomial name
- †Robiatherium cournovense Sudre, 1978

Synonyms
- Paraxiphodon cournovense Sudre, 1978

Extinct genus of endemic Palaeogene European artiodactyls

Robiatherium is an extinct genus of Palaeogene artiodactyls containing one species R. cournovense. The genus name derives from the locality of Robiac in France, where some of its fossils were described, plus the Greek θήρ/therium, meaning "beast" or "wild animal". It was known only from the middle Eocene and, like other anoplotheriids, was endemic to Western Europe. The genus was erected by Jean Sudre in 1988 for a species originally attributed to the xiphodont genus Paraxiphodon in 1978. Robiatherium had dentitions typical of the subfamily Anoplotheriinae, differing from other genera by specific differences in the molars. It is one of the earliest-appearing anoplotheriine species in the fossil record as well as the earliest to have appeared in Central Europe.

== Taxonomy ==
In 1988, French palaeontologist Jean Sudre referenced an upper molar from the Robiac-Nord locality in France that he in 1969 listed as "Anoplotherioidea indet." Referencing his previous work in 1978, he noted the specimen's previous assignment to Paraxiphodon cournovense and interpretation of the species as a possible ancestor of P. teulonense. Based on fossil material from the locality of Le Bretou as well as older Quercy collections from the University of Montpellier, he determined that the species belonged not to the Xiphodontidae, but the Anoplotheriinae subfamily of the Anoplotheriidae. Thus, he established the genus name Robiatherium, which the species named in 1978 was reassigned to.

=== Classification ===
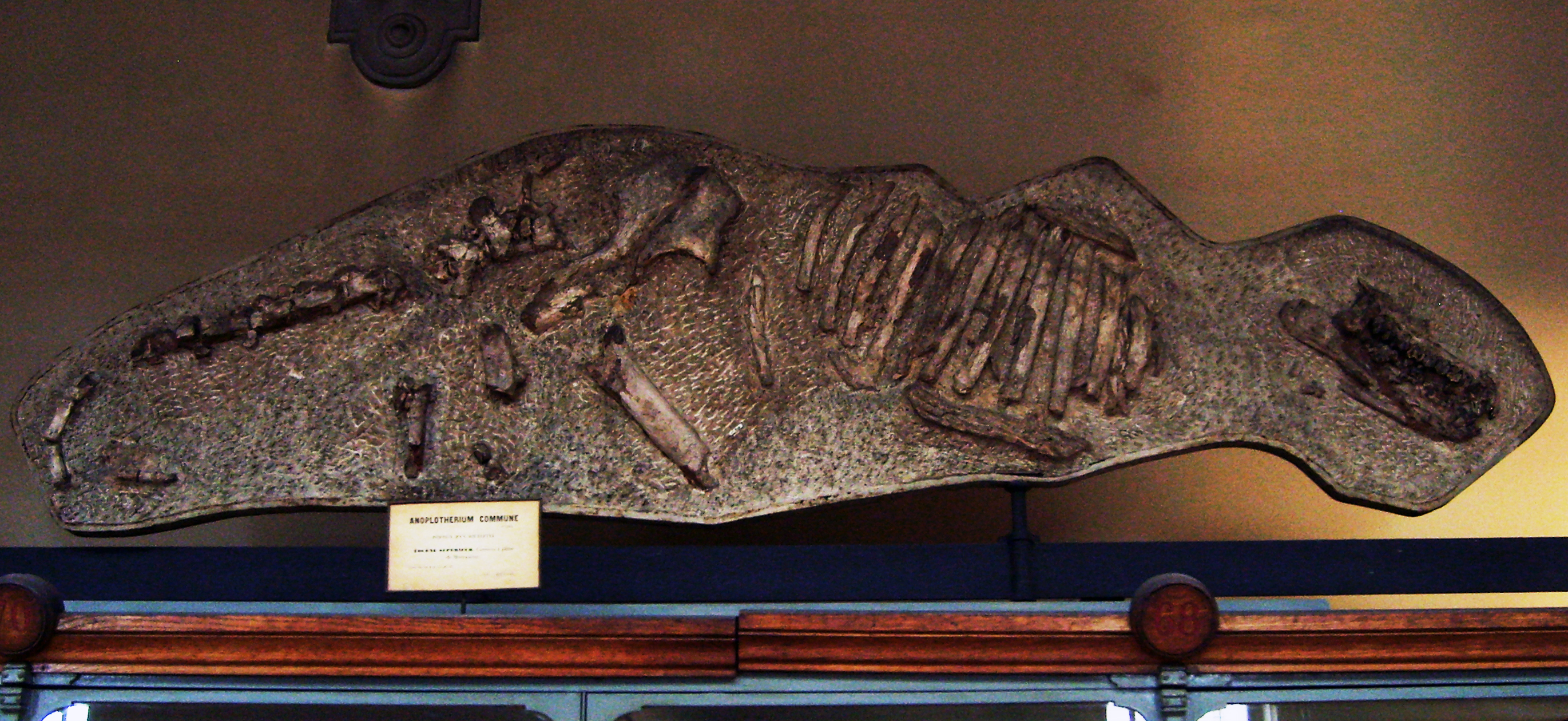
Skeleton of Anoplotherium commune, National Museum of Natural History, France

Robiatherium belongs to the Anoplotheriidae, a Palaeogene artiodactyl family endemic to western Europe that lived from the middle Eocene to the early Oligocene (~44 to 30 Ma, possible earliest record at ~48 Ma). The exact evolutionary origins and dispersals of the anoplotheriids are uncertain, but they exclusively resided within the continent when it was an archipelago that was isolated by seaway barriers from other regions such as Balkanatolia and the rest of eastern Eurasia. The Anoplotheriidae's relations with other members of the Artiodactyla are not well-resolved, with some determining it to be either a tylopod (which includes camelids and merycoidodonts of the Palaeogene) or a close relative to the infraorder and some others believing that it may have been closer to the Ruminantia (which includes tragulids and other close Palaeogene relatives).

The Anoplotheriidae consists of two subfamilies, the Dacrytheriinae and Anoplotheriinae, the latter of which is the subfamily that Robiatherium belongs to. The Dacrytheriinae is the older subfamily of the two that first appeared in the middle Eocene (since the Mammal Palaeogene zones unit MP13, possibly up to MP10), although some authors consider them to be a separate family in the form of the Dacrytheriidae. Anoplotheriines made their first appearances by the late Eocene (MP15-MP16), or ~41-40 Ma, within western Europe with Duerotherium and Robiatherium. After a significant gap of anoplotheriines in MP17a-MP17b, the derived anoplotheriids Anoplotherium and Diplobune made their first appearances in western Europe by MP18, although their exact origins are unknown.

Conducting studies focused on the phylogenetic relations within the Anoplotheriidae has proven difficult due to the general scarcity of fossil specimens of most genera. The phylogenetic relations of the Anoplotheriidae as well as the Xiphodontidae, Mixtotheriidae, and Cainotheriidae have also been elusive due to the selenodont morphologies of the molars, which were convergent with tylopods or ruminants. Some researchers considered the selenodont families Anoplotheriidae, Xiphodontidae, and Cainotheriidae to be within Tylopoda due to postcranial features that were similar to the tylopods from North America in the Palaeogene. Other researchers tie them as being more closely related to ruminants than tylopods based on dental morphology. Different phylogenetic analyses have produced different results for the "derived" selenodont Eocene European artiodactyl families, making it uncertain whether they were closer to the Tylopoda or Ruminantia.

In an article published in 2019, Romain Weppe et al. conducted a phylogenetic analysis on the Cainotherioidea within the Artiodactyla based on mandibular and dental characteristics, specifically in terms of relationships with artiodactyls of the Palaeogene. The results retrieved that the superfamily was closely related to the Mixtotheriidae and Anoplotheriidae. They determined that the Cainotheriidae, Robiacinidae, Anoplotheriidae, and Mixtotheriidae formed a clade that was the sister group to the Ruminantia while Tylopoda, along with the Amphimerycidae and Xiphodontidae, split earlier in the tree. The phylogenetic tree published in multiple journal articles is outlined below:

- - Eurodexis russelli
  - Dichobune leporina
  - - - Amphimeryx murinus
      - - Xiphodon castrense
        - Tylopoda
          - Paratoceras coatesi
          - Eotylopus reedi
    - - Ruminantia
        - Parvitragulus priscus
        - - Lophiomeryx chalaniati
          - Archaeomeryx optatus
      - - Mixtotheriidae
          Mixtotherium cuspidatum
        - Anoplotheriidae
          - Anoplotherium latipes
          - Dacrytherium ovinum
        - Cainotherioidea
          - Robiacinidae
            - Robiacina lavergnesis
            - - Robiacina minuta
              - Robiacina quercyi
          - Cainotheriidae
            - Palembertina deplasi
            - - Oxacroninae
                - Paroxacron bergeri
                - - Paroxacron valdense
                  - Oxacron courtoisii
              - Cainotheriinae
                - Cainotherium laticurvatum
                - - Caenomeryx
                    - Caenomeryx filholi
                    - Caenomeryx procommunis
                  - Plesiomeryx
                    - Plesiomeryx cadurcensis
                    - Plesiomeryx huerzeleri

In 2022, Weppe created a phylogenetic analysis in his academic thesis regarding Palaeogene artiodactyl lineages, focusing on the endemic European families. The phylogenetic tree, according to Weppe, is the first to conduct phylogenetic affinities of all anoplotheriid genera, although not all individual species were included. He found that the Anoplotheriidae, Mixtotheriidae, and Cainotherioidea form a clade based on synapomorphic dental traits (traits thought to have originated from their most recent common ancestor). The result, Weppe mentioned, matches up with previous phylogenetic analyses on the Cainotherioidea with other endemic European Palaeogene artiodactyls that support the families as a clade. As a result, he argued that the proposed superfamily Anoplotherioidea, composing of the Anoplotheriidae and Xiphodontidae as proposed by Alan W. Gentry and Hooker in 1988, is invalid due to the polyphyly of the lineages in the phylogenetic analysis. However, the Xiphodontidae was still found to compose part of a wider clade with the three other groups. He said that Ephelcomenus, Duerotherium, and Robiatherium compose a clade of the Anoplotheriidae.

== Description ==
The dental formula of the Anoplotheriidae is 3.1.4.33.1.4.3 for a total of 44 teeth, consistent with the primitive dental formula for early-middle Palaeogene placental mammals. Anoplotheriids have selenodont (crescent-shaped ridge form) or bunoselenodont (bunodont and selenodont) premolars (P/p) and molars (M/m) made for leaf-browsing diets. The canines (C/c) of the Anoplotheriidae are overall undifferentiated from the incisors (I/i). The lower premolars of the family are piercing and elongated. The upper molars are bunoselenodont in form while the lower molars have selenodont labial cuspids and bunodont (or rounded) lingual cuspids. The subfamily Anoplotheriinae differs from the Dacrytheriinae by the lack of both molariform upper premolars with crescent-shaped paraconules and the lower molars with a third cusp between the metaconid and entoconid.

Robiatherium in particular is diagnosed specifically in terms of its dentition. It has trapezoidal upper molars that increase in size from M^{1} to M^{3}. Their protocone cusps are in a middle position and subconical. Robiatherium also lacks postparaconule ridges. The labial sides of the paracone and metacone cusps of the upper molars are concave and lack ridges, the labial sides of the styles forming W-shaped ectolophs. The dental characteristics of Robiatherium, especially the ectoloph shapes of the molars, are somewhat reminiscent of the Xiphodontidae but are most similar to the Anoplotheriinae.

Robiatherium is also diagnosed as being a small-sized anoplotheriine. It does not have any direct size or weight estimates, but Miguel-Ángel Cuesta and Ainara Badiola discussed size comparisons of anoplotheriines. They observed that Robiatherium was smaller than Duerotherium, which itself was smaller than Ephelcomenus, Anoplotherium, and most Diplobune species.

== Palaeoecology ==
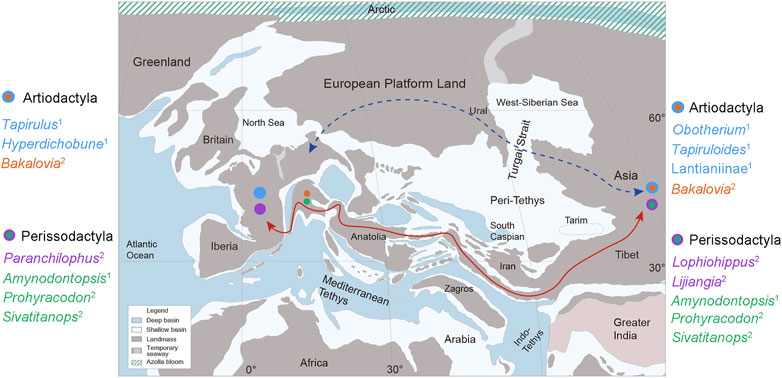
Palaeogeography of Europe and Asia during the middle Eocene with possible artiodactyl and perissodactyl dispersal routes.

For much of the Eocene, a hothouse climate with humid, tropical environments with consistently high precipitations prevailed. Modern mammalian orders including the Perissodactyla, Artiodactyla, and Primates (or the suborder Euprimates) appeared already by the early Eocene, diversifying rapidly and developing dentitions specialized for folivory. The omnivorous forms mostly either switched to folivorous diets or went extinct by the middle Eocene (47 – 37 Ma) along with the archaic "condylarths". By the late Eocene (approx. 37 – 33 Ma), most of the ungulate form dentitions shifted from bunodont cusps to cutting ridges (i.e. lophs) for folivorous diets.

Land-based connections to the north of the developing Atlantic Ocean were interrupted around 53 Ma, meaning that North America and Greenland were no longer well-connected to western Europe. From the early Eocene up until the Grande Coupure extinction event (56 Ma – 33.9 Ma), the western Eurasian continent was separated into three landmasses, the former two of which were isolated by seaways: western Europe (an archipelago), Balkanatolia, and eastern Eurasia (Balkanatolia was in between the Paratethys Sea of the north and the Neotethys Ocean of the south). The Holarctic mammalian faunas of western Europe were therefore mostly isolated from other continents including Greenland, Africa, and eastern Eurasia, allowing for endemism to occur within western Europe. The European mammals of the late Eocene (MP17 – MP20) were mostly descendants of endemic middle Eocene groups as a result.

Robiatherium is known only from MP16 localities of southern France, contemporary with dacrytheriines and the Iberian anoplotheriine Duerotherium. Robiatherium is the earliest-known anoplotheriine to have appeared in central Europe, but it and other anoplotheriines are not present in any MP17 locality, making the evolutionary history of anoplotheriines not fully known. The locality of Robiac indicates that Robiatherium coexisted with similar mammal faunas such as the herpetotheriids Peratherium and Amphiperatherium, apatotherian Heterohyus, hyaenodonts Paroxyaena and Cynohyaenodon, miacids Paramiacis and Quercygale, palaeotheres (Palaeotherium, Plagiolophus, Anchilophus), lophiodont Lophiodon, cebochoerids Cebochoerus and Acotherulum, choeropotamid Choeropotamus, dichobunid Mouillacitherium, robiacinid Robiacina, xiphodonts (Xiphodon, Dichodon, and Haplomeryx), amphimerycid Amphimeryx, and other anoplotheriids Catodontherium and Dacrytherium.
