= Duerotherium =

Duerotherium Temporal range: Middle Eocene 41–37 Ma

Scientific classification
- Kingdom: Animalia
- Phylum: Chordata
- Class: Mammalia
- Order: Artiodactyla
- Family: †Anoplotheriidae
- Subfamily: †Anoplotheriinae
- Genus: †Duerotherium; Cuesta & Badiola, 2009
- Species: †D. sudrei

Binomial name
- †Duerotherium sudrei Cuesta & Badiola, 2009

Extinct genus of endemic Palaeogene European artiodactyls

Duerotherium is an extinct genus of artiodactyl that lived during the Middle Eocene and is only known from the Iberian Peninsula. The genus is a member of the family Anoplotheriidae and the subfamily Anoplotheriinae, and contains one species, D. sudrei. Like other anoplotheriids, it was endemic to Western Europe. The genus was described based on a left fragment of a maxilla (upper jaw) from the Mazaterón Formation of the Duero Basin, from which its name derives, in 2009. Its dentition is mostly typical of the Anoplotheriinae but differs from related genera in the elongated and triangular third upper premolar and traits of the molars. It is thought to have been part of an endemic fauna that evolved in the Iberian Peninsula during the Middle Eocene, when climates were subtropical.

== Taxonomy ==
In 2009, Spanish palaeontologists Miguel-Ángel Cuesta and Ainara Badiola described a newly erected anoplotheriine genus from the Mazaterón Formation near the village of Mazaterón, which are located within the Duero Basin. The genus and type species Duerotherium sudrei was created based on a fragment of a left fragment of a maxilla with a dental series of P^{3}-M^{3} (specimen STUS 11562), which was deposited in the "Sala de las Tortugas" of the University of Salamanca. The genus etymology derives from the Duero Basin for where the fossil was described plus the Greek θήρ/therium meaning "beast" or "wild animal". The etymology of the species name was dedicated in honour of Jean Sudre for his studies on endemic European Palaeogene artiodactyls.

=== Classification ===
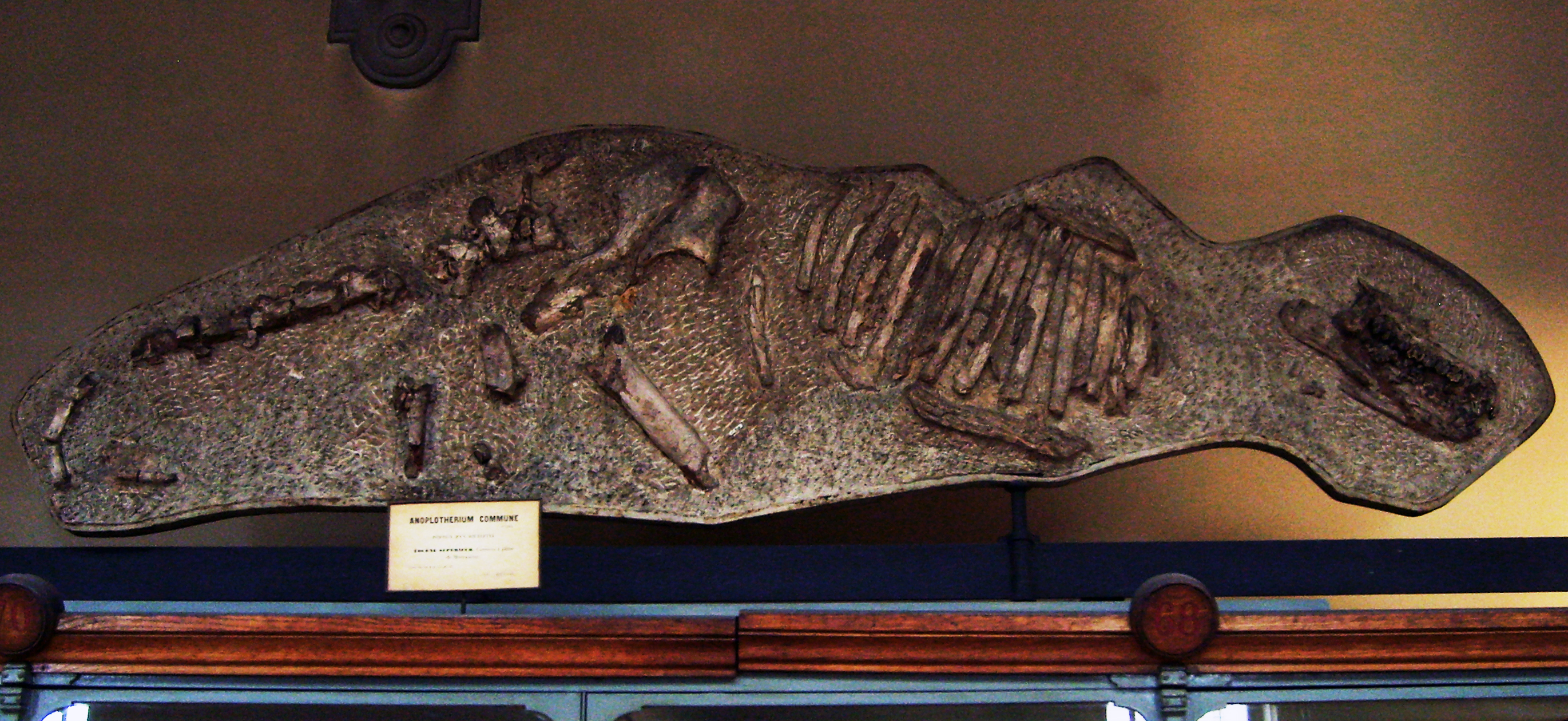
Skeleton of Anoplotherium commune, National Museum of Natural History, France

Duerotherium belongs to the Anoplotheriidae, a Palaeogene artiodactyl family endemic to Western Europe that lived from the Middle Eocene to the Early Oligocene (~44 to 30 Ma, possible earliest record at ~48 Ma). The exact evolutionary origin of anoplotheriids remain uncertain, but they were exclusively distributed in Europe when it was an archipelago that was isolated by seaway barriers from other regions such as Balkanatolia and the rest of eastern Eurasia. The Anoplotheriidae's relations with other artiodactyl groups are not well-resolved.

The Anoplotheriidae consists of two subfamilies, the Dacrytheriinae and Anoplotheriinae, and Duerotherium belongs to the latter. The Dacrytheriinae is the older subfamily and first appeared in the Middle Eocene (in the Mammal Palaeogene zones unit MP13, possibly up to MP10), although some authors consider them to be a separate family, as Dacrytheriidae. Anoplotheriines made their first appearances by the late Eocene (MP15-MP16; ~41–40 Ma) with Duerotherium and Robiatherium. After a significant gap of anoplotheriines in MP17a-MP17b, the derived anoplotheriids Anoplotherium and Diplobune made their first appearances by MP18, although their exact origins remain unknown.

In 2022, Weppe published a phylogenetic analysis in his PhD thesis regarding Palaeogene artiodactyl lineages, focusing on the endemic European families. This phylogenetic tree is the first to include all anoplotheriid genera, although not all individual species were included. In this tree, the Anoplotheriidae, Mixtotheriidae, and Cainotherioidea form a clade based on synapomorphic dental traits (newly evolved tooth features they have in common). Ephelcomenus, Duerotherium, and Robiatherium form a clade within Anoplotheriidae.

== Description ==
The dental formula of the Anoplotheriidae is 3.1.4.33.1.4.3 for a total of 44 teeth, consistent with the primitive dental formula for early-middle Palaeogene placental mammals. Anoplotheriids have selenodont (crescent-shaped ridge form) or bunoselenodont (bunodont and selenodont) premolars (P/p) and molars (M/m) made for leaf-browsing diets. The canines (C/c) of the Anoplotheriidae are overall undifferentiated from the incisors (I/i). The lower premolars of the family are piercing and elongated. The upper molars are bunoselenodont in form while the lower molars have selenodont labial cuspids and bunodont (or rounded) lingual cuspids. The subfamily Anoplotheriinae differs from the Dacrytheriinae by the lack of both molariform upper premolars with crescent-shaped paraconules and the lower molars with a third cusp between the metaconid and entoconid.

Duerotherium is diagnosed based on its dental traits based on the maxilla fragment. The P^{3} (third upper premolar) is elongated mesiodistally (front-to-back) and triangular in shape and has a protocone cusp that is positioned back in relation to the mouth and noticeable talon positioned slightly back. The morphology of the tooth of Duerotherium is similar to the P^{3} tooth of Dacrytherium based on the positions of the cusps, although the latter differs in being mesiodistally elongated compared to the former. The morphology of P^{4} is typical of the Anoplotheriinae and has only has one externally-positioned cusp.

The upper molars of Duerotherium also have similar morphologies to those of other anoplotheriines. They are bunoselenodont and have large and conical protocone cusps in the near-front of the paracone in the front areas of the teeth. The metaconule is slightly asymmetric, and the postmetaconule ridge is moderate in form. The parastyle and metastyle cusps are divergent, revealing a moderate W-shaped ectoloph ridge. The molars are heterodont and increase in size from M^{1} to M^{3}. In a top (or occlusal) outline view, the M^{1} is quadrate in shape while M^{2}-M^{3} appears more trapezoidal. It differs from each anoplotheriine genus based on various specific morphologies of the molars.

Duerotherium is described as a small-sized anoplotheriine that is slightly larger than Robiatherium but smaller than Ephelcomenus. D. sudrei is especially smaller than Anoplotherium and most species of Diplobune. It might be similar in size to Diplobune minor.

== Palaeoecology ==
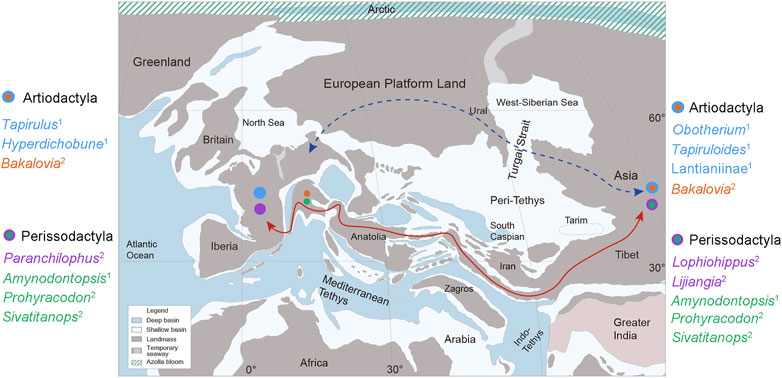
Palaeogeography of Europe and Asia during the Middle Eocene with possible artiodactyl and perissodactyl dispersal routes.

For much of the Eocene, a hothouse climate with humid, tropical environments with consistently high precipitations prevailed. Modern mammalian orders including the Perissodactyla, Artiodactyla, and Primates (or the suborder Euprimates) appeared already by the Early Eocene, diversifying rapidly and developing dentitions specialized for folivory. The omnivorous forms mostly either switched to folivorous diets or went extinct by the Middle Eocene (47–37 Ma) along with the archaic "condylarths". By the late Eocene (approx. 37–33 Ma), most of the ungulate form dentitions shifted from bunodont cusps to cutting ridges (lophs) for folivorous diets.

Land-based connections to the north of the developing Atlantic Ocean were interrupted around 53 Ma, meaning that North America and Greenland were no longer well-connected to western Europe. From the Early Eocene up until the Grande Coupure extinction event (56–33.9 Ma), the western Eurasian continent was separated into three landmasses: western Europe (an archipelago), Balkanatolia, and eastern Eurasia (Balkanatolia was in between the Paratethys Sea to the north and the Neotethys Ocean to the south). The Holarctic mammalian faunas of western Europe were therefore mostly isolated from other landmasses including Greenland, Africa, and eastern Eurasia, allowing for endemism to occur within western Europe. The European mammals of the late Eocene (MP17–MP20) were therefore mostly descendants of endemic Middle Eocene groups.

The Mazaterón Formation of the Duero Basin dates to the middle Late Eocene (Robiacian of Europe) and ranges in faunal level from MP15–MP16. Fossils of testudines, crocodilians, rodents, primates, hyaenodonts, artiodactyls, and perissodactyls were collected from the site. The mammalian taxa collected from the Eocene of the Iberian region differ from contemporary faunas in other areas of Europe, supporting the hypothesis of a division of the Iberian Peninsula as a semi-separate bioregion. The taxa known from the Mazaterón fossil site with Duerotherium include the testudines Hadrianus and Neochelys, alligatoroid Diplocynodon, baurusuchid Iberosuchus, adapoid Mazateronodon, omomyid Pseudoloris, pseudosciurid rodent Sciuroides, theridomyid rodents Pseudoltinomys and Remys, hyaenodont Proviverra, palaeotheres (Paranchilophus, Plagiolophus, Leptolophus, Palaeotherium, Cantabrotherium, Franzenium, and Iberolophus), dacrytheriines (cf. Dacrytherium), and xiphodonts (cf. Dichodon).
