= Johannes Hürzeler =

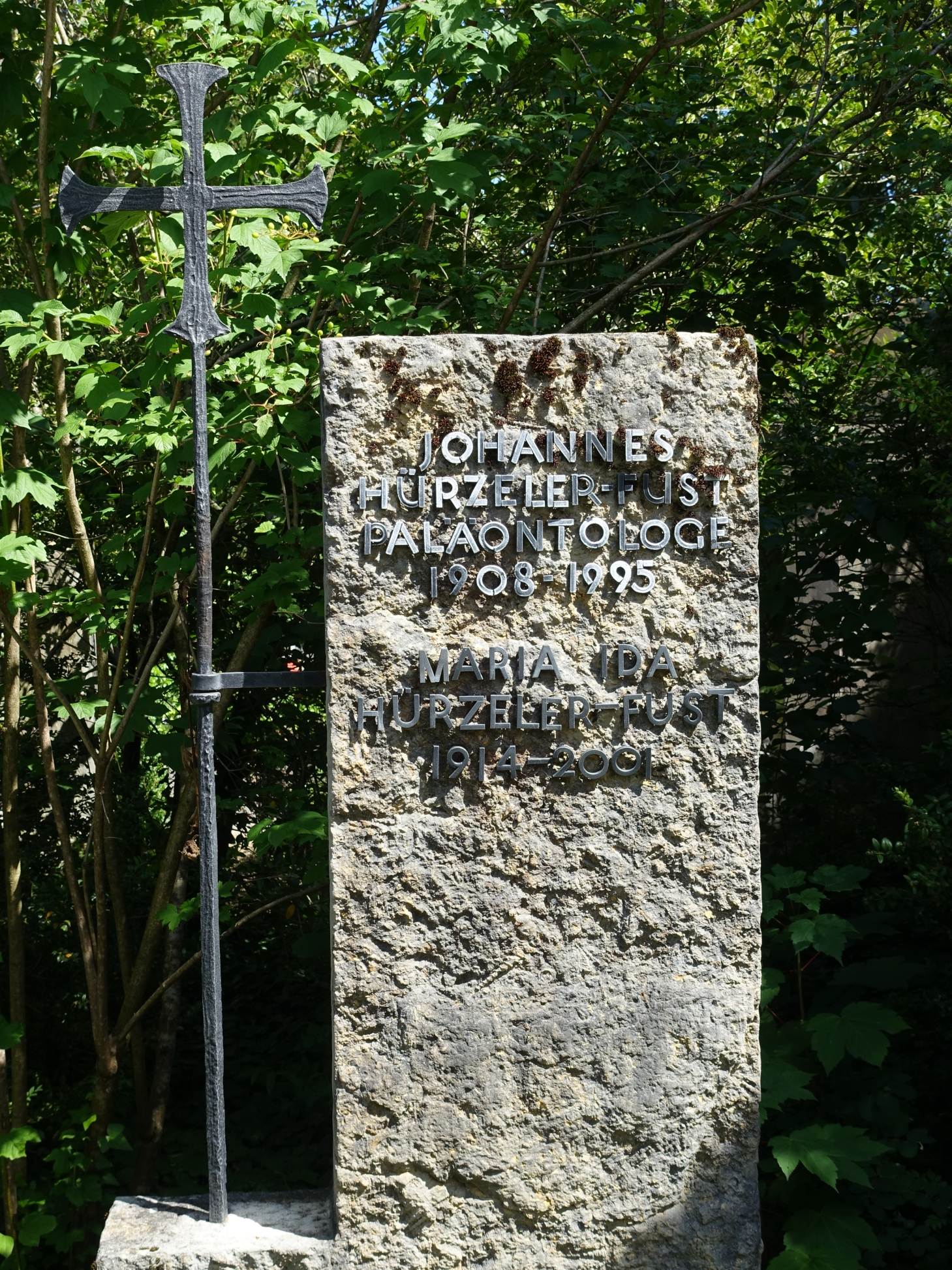
- Grave at Wolfgottesacker, Basel
- Born: February 1, 1908; Gretzenbach, Switzerland
- Died: July 24, 1995 (aged 87); Basel, Switzerland
- Known for: Research on Oreopithecus
- Awards: Corresponding member of the Académie des sciences (1971)
- Scientific career
- Fields: Paleontology, Zoology
- Institutions: University of Basel

Johannes Hürzeler (1 February 1908 – 24 July 1995) was a Swiss paleontologist.

== Biography ==
Hürzeler was professor of zoology at the University of Basel. In 1958, he discovered in a lignite mine in Tuscany fossils of an upright-walking primate dating back 8 to 10 million years, which he named "Homo bambolii". The discovery, however, was not widely accepted, as many considered it impossible that a complete primate skeleton from the Miocene could be found.

Hürzeler also argued that Oreopithecus was a direct ancestor of the great apes, a claim that was so controversial among experts that he was not even invited to a 1985 symposium on Oreopithecus. Disillusioned, Hürzeler abandoned his research. The phylogenetic position of Oreopithecus within primates remains unresolved.

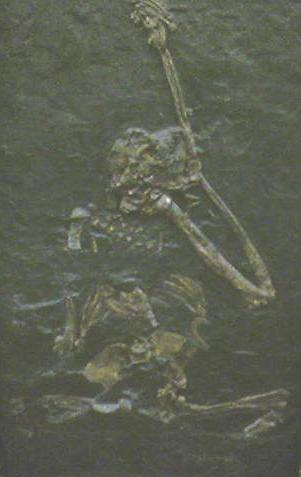
Oreopithecus

In 1971, he was elected a corresponding member of the Académie des sciences.

He was buried at the Wolfgottesacker cemetery in Basel.

== Selected works ==
- Contribution à l'odontologie et à la phylogénèse du genre Pliopithecus Gervais. In: Annales de Paléontologie. Vol. 40, 1954, pp. 5–63.
- Oreopithecus bambolii Gervais: a preliminary report. In: Verhandlungen der Naturforschenden Gesellschaft Basel. Vol. 69, 1958, pp. 1–47.
