= Selenodont =

Teeth found in ruminant herbivores

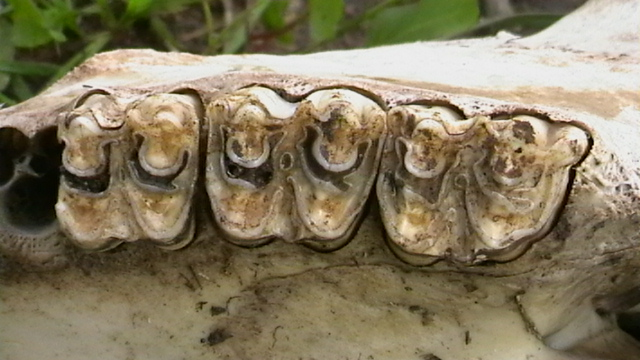
Selenodont cusps on cow cheek teeth

Selenodont teeth are the type of molars and premolars commonly found in ruminant herbivores. They are characterized by low crowns, and crescent-shaped cusps when viewed from above (crown view).

The term comes from the Ancient Greek roots σελήνη (selḗnē, 'moon' or 'moonlike'), and ὀδούς, ὀδόντος (odoús, odóntos, 'tooth'). They differ from human molars in that the occlusal surface is not covered in enamel; rather, the layers of enamel, dentine, and cementum are all exposed, with cementum in the middle, surrounded by a layer of enamel, then a layer of dentine, all wrapped in a second outer layer of enamel.

Viewed from the side, selenodont teeth form a series of triangular cusps. The combination of triangular profiles with ridges formed by the exposed layers makes the lateral chewing motion of ruminants an effective way to break-up tough vegetable matter.
