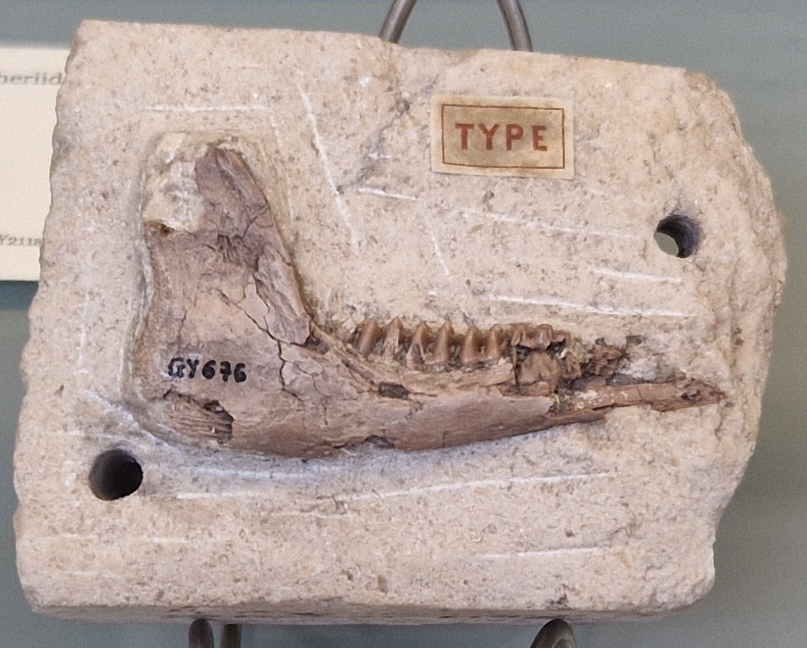
- Amphimeryx murinus holotype mandible, National Museum of Natural History, France

Scientific classification
- Kingdom: Animalia
- Phylum: Chordata
- Class: Mammalia
- Infraclass: Placentalia
- Order: Artiodactyla
- Family: †Amphimerycidae
- Genus: †Amphimeryx; Pomel, 1848

Type species
- †Anoplotherium murinum (= †Amphimeryx murinus) Cuvier, 1822

Other species
- †A. collotarsus? Pomel, 1851; †A. riparius Aymard, 1855

Synonyms
- Genus synonymy: Amphimerix Pomel, 1849; Hyægulus Pomel, 1851; Palæon Aymard, 1855; Amphimoeryx Gervais, 1859; Xiphodontherium Filhol, 1877; Synonyms of A. murinus: Anoplotherium murinum Cuvier, 1822; Xiphodontherium primævum Filhol, 1877; Xiphodontherium secundarium Filhol, 1877; Synonyms of A. collotarsus: Hyægulus collotarsus Pomel, 1851; Synonyms of A. riparius: Palæon riparium Aymard, 1855

= Amphimeryx =

Amphimeryx Temporal range: Late Eocene – Early Oligocene 37–32.5 Ma

Extinct genus of European artiodactyls

Amphimeryx is an extinct genus of small mammals with slightly deer-like forms belonging to the Amphimerycidae, classified within the order Artiodactyla. It was endemic to western Europe and lived from the Late Eocene to the Early Oligocene, about 37 to 32.5 million years ago. The taxonomic history of the artiodactyl genus extends back to 1804 when dental fossils of the type species A. murinus were first recognized by the French palaeontologist Georges Cuvier, who gave the species its current scientific name in 1822. It was first assigned by early naturalists to two other artiodactyl genera, Anoplotherium and Dichobune. In 1848, the French palaeontologist Auguste Pomel recognized that the dentition of A. murinus was roughly similar to those of ruminants and therefore designated to its own genus Amphimeryx, the name meaning "near ruminant". Two other species named in later studies, A. collotarsus and A. riparius, are purported, although their validities are uncertain.

Amphimeryx is best known for its fused cuboid bone and navicular bone in its hind legs. The fused "cubonavicular bone" is also recorded in derived ruminants including extant ones in an instance of parallel evolution. Additional traits shared by Amphimeryx with modern ruminants include its middle two digits being fused and its two side digits being greatly reduced, making it functionally didactyl (walking on its two middle toes). Despite its selenodont (crescent-like ridges) dentition being similar to ruminants, it differs from them in part by retaining its first premolars instead of losing them evolutionarily. Its molars have specialized levels of selenodonty, meaning that they have five total cusps on them. The skull of Amphimeryx is elongated and has a sloped form in its front, large orbits, and a long snout. The dentition of Amphimeryx suggests that it may have been a leaf-eater. In comparison to contemporary artiodactyls, it was quite small, weighing as little as 1.511 kg (3.331 lb).

Amphimeryx inhabited the central region of western Europe back when it was an archipelago that was isolated from the rest of Eurasia, living in a tropical-subtropical environment with various other ungulates. It went extinct shortly after the Grande Coupure extinction event (thought to have occurred within a 33.9 to 33.4 Ma time range), coinciding with shifts towards further glaciation and seasonality plus dispersals of Asian immigrant faunas into western Europe. The extinction causes of Amphimeryx are unclear, but it was the last representative of the Amphimerycidae.

== Taxonomy ==
=== Research history ===
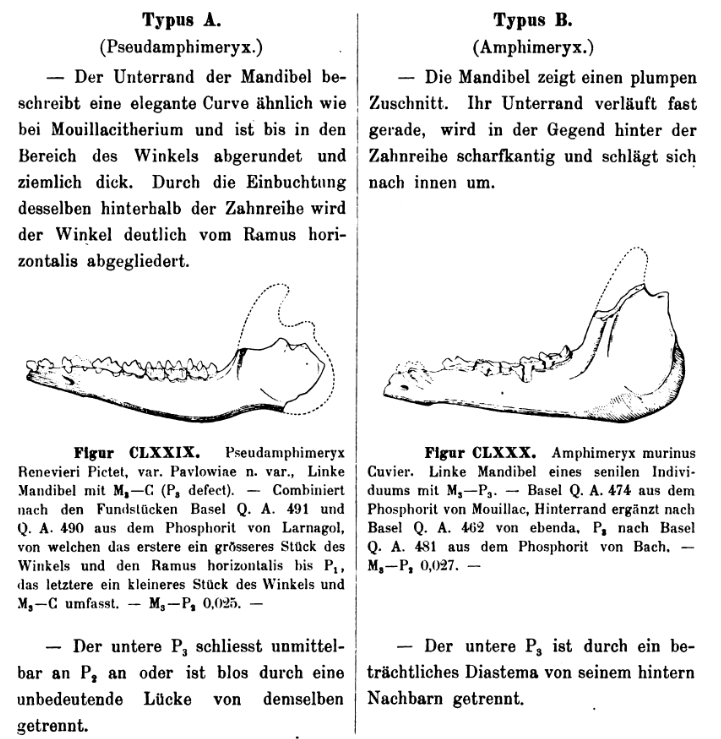
Mandibles of Pseudamphimeryx renevieri (left) and Amphimeryx murinus (right)

Amphimeryx has had a somewhat complex taxonomic history in which the type species A. murinus was studied and formally named as a species classified to earlier-named genera long before it was reassigned to its own genus. In addition, multiple species named by earlier taxonomists were synonymized (or made into invalid names for the same taxon) with A. murinus by later taxonomists while multiple genera were later made synonyms of Amphimeryx, resulting in transfers of species originally named for the formerly valid genera into the currently valid Amphimeryx.

Fossil evidence of Amphimeryx from Montmartre fossils in Paris, France was first described in 1804 by the French naturalist Georges Cuvier, who assigned them to the fossil artiodactyl genus Anoplotherium and created the species name Anoplotherium minimum; he noted that unlike with other species classified to Anoplotherium, A. minimum was not known by any postcranial fossil evidence (non-skull bones). In 1822, Cuvier renamed A. minimum to A. murinum and reassigned it, along with A. leporina and A. obliquum, into the newly named Anoplotherium subgenus Dichobune. In 1848, the French palaeontologist Auguste Pomel, recognizing Dichobune as a separate genus from Anoplotherium, reclassified "Dichobune obliqua" and "D. murina" to the newly named genus Amphimeryx, also stating that it would have been close in affinity to ruminants. The genus name Amphimeryx derives from the Ancient Greek words ἀμφί (near) and μήρυξ (ruminant), meaning "near ruminant". This reclassification was followed by the French palaeontologist Paul Gervais in 1848–1852, who described additional dental fossil evidence of A. murinus from the limestone marls of a location named "Barthélemy" in the French commune of Saint-Saturnin-lès-Apt. Gervais also noted that its dentition was similar to those of extant ruminants because of the double crescent shapes on the molars' crowns.

In 1851, Pomel created the genus Hyægulus, arguing that it was related to another artiodactyl Cainotherium and is known from tooth and foot fossils. The first species he named was H. collotarsus, which he said was the size of C. laticurvatum. The second that Pomel named was H. murinus (not to be confused with A. murinus), which according to Pomel was smaller and more gracile (or slender-built). The palaeontologist described Hyægulus as having both a cuboid bone that is fused to the navicular bone and metatarsal bones that are not fused together. In 1855 during a session at a science conference named "Congrès Scientifiques de France," the French palaeontologist Auguste Aymard read a report for a fossil collection belonging to Pichot-Dumazel, listing Palæon riparium among the taxa represented in it.

The French palaeontologist Henri Filhol in 1877 created the genus Xiphodontherium and recognized two species. The first named species was X. primævum, which Filhol wrote was related to Xiphodon and was known from a lower jaw in the French locality of Mouillac in the department of Tarn-et-Garonne. The second species that he named was X. secundarium, also from Mouillac. He also observed that both species had complete dentitions for a total of 44 teeth. In 1891, the Swiss palaeontologist Ludwig Rütimeyer established three more species of Xiphodontherium: X. pygmaeum, X. obliquum, and X. schlosseri. The British naturalist Richard Lydekker in 1885 synonymized Xiphodontherium with Xiphodon and transferred X. secundarium into the latter genus.

In 1906, Swiss palaeontologist Hans Georg Stehlin wrote that the dentition of Hyaegulus collotarsus very closely resembled that of Amphimeryx to the point that he made Hyaegulus a synonym of Amphimeryx. He then synonymized H. murinus with another artiodactyl species Oxacron courtoisi. In 1910, Stehlin reconfirmed his synonymization of Hyaegulus with Amphimeryx, of which he considered "H. collotarsus" a valid species still. He also synonymized Palaeon but retained validity of "P. riparium" as a species of Amphimeryx (A. riparius). Stehlin additionally invalidated Xiphodontherium and made its two species, X. primaevum and X. secundarium, synonyms of A. murinus. He also reclassified "X." schlosseri to the new genus Pseudamphimeryx and synonymized both X. pygmaeum and X. obliquum with it. Stehlin then tentatively reclassified "Anoplotherium obliquum" to Haplomeryx instead of Dichobune or Amphimeryx.

In 1978, the French palaeontologist Jean Sudre synonymized A. collotarsus with A. murinus because he did not think that size differences alone were adequate enough to justify species distinctness. He additionally noted that A. riparius, diagnosed solely as being large-sized, is only known from a type specimen originally from Ronzon that had since been lost. On the other hand, some palaeontologists have continued using the name A. collotarsus, also spelled "A. collatarsus."

=== Classification ===
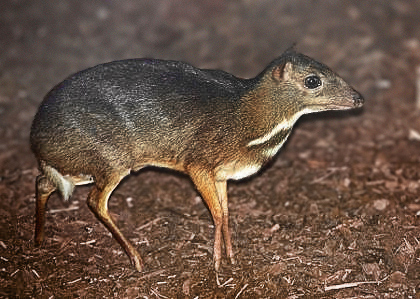
Because of some similar anatomical traits of the amphimerycids to those of ruminants (like the Java mouse-deer (Tragulus javanicus), pictured), they were previously considered ruminants by biologists. Today, their evolutionary relationship to ruminants and other artiodactyls proves unclear.

Amphimeryx is the type genus of Amphimerycidae, a family of artiodactyls endemic to western Europe that lived from the middle to the earliest Oligocene (~44 to 33 Ma). Like the other contemporary endemic artiodactyl families of western Europe, the evolutionary origins of the Amphimerycidae are poorly known. The family is generally thought to have made its first appearance by the unit MP14 (43.5 to 41.2 Ma) of the Mammal Palaeogene zones, making them the first artiodactyls with selenodont dentition (crescent-like ridges on cheek teeth) to have appeared in the landmass along with the Xiphodontidae. The first representative of the Amphimerycidae to have appeared was Pseudamphimeryx, lasting from MP14 to MP17 (43.5 to 37 Ma). Amphimeryx made its first appearance in MP18 (37 to 35 Ma) as the only other known amphimerycid genus and lasted up to MP21 (33.9 to 32.5 Ma), after the Grande Coupure faunal turnover event.

Because of its similar anatomical traits with ruminants, some palaeontologists had originally included the Amphimerycidae within the suborder Ruminantia while some others rejected the placement. Today, its similarities with ruminants is thought to have been an instance of parallel evolution, in which amphimerycids and ruminants independently gained similar traits. While amphimerycids have typically been excluded from the Ruminantia due to dental characteristics, it does not eliminate the possibility of them being sister taxa to ruminants by the latter independently gaining longer legs and more selenodont (crescent-shaped) dentition. Its affinities, along with those of other endemic European artiodactyls, are unclear; the Amphimerycidae, Anoplotheriidae, Xiphodontidae, Mixtotheriidae, and Cainotheriidae have been determined to be closer to either tylopods (i.e. camelids and merycoidodonts) or ruminants. Different phylogenetic analyses have produced different results for the "derived" selenodont Eocene European artiodactyl families, making it uncertain whether they were closer to the Tylopoda or Ruminantia.

In an article published in 2019, Romain Weppe et al. conducted a phylogenetic analysis on the Cainotherioidea within the Artiodactyla based on mandibular and dental characteristics, specifically in terms of relationships with artiodactyls of the Palaeogene. The results found that the superfamily was closely related to the Mixtotheriidae and Anoplotheriidae. They determined that the Cainotheriidae, Robiacinidae, Anoplotheriidae, and Mixtotheriidae formed a clade that was the sister group to the Ruminantia while Tylopoda, along with the Amphimerycidae and Xiphodontidae split earlier in the tree. The phylogenetic tree used for the journal and another published work about the cainotherioids is outlined below:

- - Eurodexis russelli
  - Dichobune leporina
  - - - Amphimeryx murinus
      - - Xiphodon castrense
        - Tylopoda
          - Paratoceras coatesi
          - Eotylopus reedi
    - - Ruminantia
        - Parvitragulus priscus
        - - Lophiomeryx chalaniati
          - Archaeomeryx optatus
      - - Mixtotheriidae
          Mixtotherium cuspidatum
        - Anoplotheriidae
          - Anoplotherium latipes
          - Dacrytherium ovinum
        - Cainotherioidea
          - Robiacinidae
            - Robiacina lavergnesis
            - - Robiacina minuta
              - Robiacina quercyi
          - Cainotheriidae
            - Palembertina deplasi
            - - Oxacroninae
                - Paroxacron bergeri
                - - Paroxacron valdense
                  - Oxacron courtoisii
              - Cainotheriinae
                - Cainotherium laticurvatum
                - - Caenomeryx
                    - Caenomeryx filholi
                    - Caenomeryx procommunis
                  - Plesiomeryx
                    - Plesiomeryx cadurcensis
                    - Plesiomeryx huerzeleri

In 2020, Vincent Luccisano et al. created a phylogenetic tree of the basal (or evolutionarily early) artiodactyls, including a majority endemic to western Europe, from the Palaeogene. In one clade, the "bunoselenodont endemic European" Mixtotheriidae, Anoplotheriidae, Xiphodontidae, Amphimerycidae, Cainotheriidae, and Robiacinidae are grouped together with the Ruminantia. The phylogenetic tree as produced by the authors is shown below:

- Artiodactyla
  - Bunophorus
  - - Gunophorus
    - Diacodexis
  - - - Protodichobune
      - Eurodexis
    - - - Buxobune
        - - Mouillacitherium
          - Meniscodon
        - - - Hyperdichobune
            - - Dichobune robertiana
              - - Dichobune leporina
                - - Homacodon
                  - - Gobiohyus
                    - Suina
                      - - Khirtharia
                        - Entelodon
                      - - Palaeocheorus
                        - Perchoerus
          - - Haplobunodontidae
              - Haplobunodon
              - - Cuisitherium
                - Lophiobunodon
            - - Mixtotherium
              - - Robiacina
                - - - - Dacrytherium
                      - Diplobune
                    - - Xiphodon
                      - Paraxiphodon
                  - - - Cainotherium
                      - Paroxacron
                    - - Archaeomeryx
                      - - Amphimeryx
                        - Pseudamphimeryx
      - - Aumelasia
        - - - Hallebune
            - Amphirhagatherium
          - - Cebochoeridae
              - Cebochoerus
              - Gervachoerus
            - - Choeropotamus
              - Siamotherium

In 2022, Weppe conducted a phylogenetic analysis in his academic thesis regarding Palaeogene artiodactyl lineages, focusing most specifically on the endemic European families. One large monophyletic set consisted of the Hyperdichobuninae, Amphimerycidae, Xiphodontidae, and Cainotherioidea based on dental synapomorphies, of which the hyperdichobunines are paraphyletic in relation to the other clades. In terms of the amphimerycids, while the clade consisting of P. renevieri and A. murinus was recovered as a sister group to the other endemic artiodactyl clades, the placement of P. schlosseri has rendered the Amphimerycidae paraphyletic in relation to the derived amphimerycid species and other families. He argued that the Amphimerycidae thus needs a systemic revision for which P. schlosseri would be assigned to a new genus and removed from the Amphimerycidae.

== Description ==
=== Skull ===
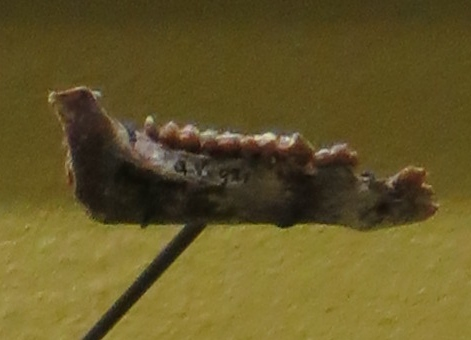
A. collotarsus mandible, Natural History Museum of Basel

The Amphimerycidae is defined in part as having an elongated snout and large orbits that are widened in their backs. Amphimeryx specifically is described as having a skull whose peak at its top area rapidly slopes down to the skull's front. The skull is also diagnosed as having strong body orifices in its basicranium and projecting occipital crests (prominent ridges within the occipital bone). Pseudamphimeryx and Amphimeryx, both known by multiple skull specimens, have very similar forms but differ based on a few characteristics. Amphimeryx is also distinguished from Pseudamphimeryx by the more well-developed occipital crest. Its skull additionally resembles those of both artiodactyl relatives Dacrytherium and Tapirulus.

The skull of Amphimeryx is very elongated compared to even those of both artiodactyls Pseudamphimeryx and Mouillacitherium. The parietal bone and squamosal bone both make up a prominent portion of the cranial cavity's wall. Both amphimerycid genera have especially prominent occipital and sagittal crests, the latter of which each divide into two less prominent branches behind the fronto-parietal suture (located within the frontal and parietal bones) that extend up to the supraorbital foramen. This is unlike Mouillacitherium where the crest's extension only goes up to the foramen's back. A glenoid surface (or shallow depression) of Amphimeryx is positioned slightly above the overall base of the skull and has a slightly convex form as opposed to a flat one like in primitive ruminants. The glenoid region of the skull also has a deep concavity above it like in ruminants but unlike in anoplotheriids. The zygomatic arch, or cheek bone, is thin. The back of the skull of Amphimeryx is similar that of Tapirulus but is even narrower and has lesser-developed occipital crests. The orientation of the occipital crest differs by amphimerycid genus, with that of Amphimeryx being tilted backwards. Amphimerycids have primitive "mastoid" forms (in which the periotic bone of the ear is exposed to the skull's surface) akin to those of the dichobunids Dichobune and Mouillacitherium.

The frontal bones of both amphimerycid genera are large and flat, being particularly sizeable in their supraorbital portions; this trait is more pronounced in Amphimeryx. The frontal bones of Amphimeryx are close to the orbits' upper edges and are more prominent in position between the two orbits than that of Pseudamphimeryx. The supraorbital foramen of Amphimeryx is wider than it is long and is proportionally larger than that of Pseudamphimeryx. It is also more perpendicular to the sagittal plane in its back edge, which is not oriented backwards like in Pseudamphimeryx. The lacrimal bone of both amphimerycids, but especially in Amphimeryx, has an extensive pars facialis (underside of the orbit) and is quadrangular in shape, narrowing at its front. The orbit is large, positioned back in relation to the overall skull, wide at its back area, and more curved at its upper compared to lower edge. There is no difference between both amphimerycids in terms of the orbits. The optic foramen, located in the sphenoid bone, extends more forward in Amphimeryx than in Pseudamphimeryx. While the nasal bone is not as well-preserved in Amphimeryx fossils, the frontonasal suture is implied by research to have formed a W shape on the skull's upper surface like that of Pseudamphimeryx. Both amphimerycid genera also have similar, although not identical, medial positions of the infraorbital foramen in the maxilla. The palatine bones of Amphimeryx and Pseudamphimeryx are narrower at their front than back ends.

The mandible of Amphimeryx is straight at the lower edge of its horizontal branch, or the mandibular corpus, and has a large and slightly rounded angular border. It is unclear as to whether or not the coronoid process of the mandible is positioned high as in ruminants (a gap that Colette Dechaseaux recognized by drawing alternate reconstructions of the skull of A. murinus with different coronoid process positions, one originally by Stehlin and the other by her with a higher position).

Amphimeryx, or A. cf. murinus, is also known from a brain endocast, although the endocasts of it and Pseudamphimeryx were not as well-studied. Its neocortex was described by Dechaseaux as being of a primitive and simple type in the larger evolutionary scale of artiodactyls.

=== Dentition ===
The dental formula of the Amphimerycidae is 3.1.4.33.1.4.3 (3 incisors, 1 canine, four premolars and three molars in each half of the upper jaw, and 3 incisors, 1 canines, 4 premolars and 3 molars on each half of the lower jaw) for a total of 44 teeth consistent with the primitive dental formula for early-middle Palaeogene placental mammals. The canines (C/c) are incisiform (incisor (I/i) form) and therefore differ little from the incisors themselves. The premolars (P/p) are elongated and may generally be separated by diastemata (gaps between teeth). The lower premolars have three lobes, or developed areas on their crowns. The upper molars (M/m) are more developed in form and are generally subtriangular in shape, although some may be more rectangular. They have five crescent-shaped (selenodont) tubercles and sometimes a partial hypocone cusp that may be present in all species. Amphimerycids differ from ruminants, particularly the basal clade Tragulina, in the retentions of their first premolars and their high levels of specialization in their selenodonty and number of cusps in their molars. Their dentitions more closely resemble those of xiphodonts or dacrytheriines than of ruminants.

Amphimeryx specifically is diagnosed in part as having flat canines and premolars that are compressed on their transverse side. P_{2} is separated from P_{1} and P_{3} by very large diastemata between it. The molars each have five crescent-shaped cusps, the protocone cusp being connected to the parastyle cusp in the upper molars. The upper molars lack a middle cingulum and have W-shaped ectolophs (crests or ridges of upper molar teeth). The labial cuspids of the lower molars are strongly crescent-shaped while the lingual cuspids are subconical. The peaks of the crescent shapes on the metaconid and entoconid form very acute angles, a diagnostic trait differing the molars of Amphimeryx from those of Pseudamphimeryx.

In terms of non-diagnostic features of the amphimerycids, both genera have somewhat asymmetrical incisors that are shovel-shaped and have sharp edges on their crowns. The canines are similar to incisors but differ by their slightly more asymmetrical shapes. P^{1} and P^{2} are both narrow and elongated, with the former tooth is larger than the latter. The upper molar row slightly increases in size from M^{1} to M^{3}. The overall selenodonty and brachyodonty (low-crowned teeth) of amphimerycids suggest that they were adapted towards folivorous (leaf-eating) dietary habits.

=== Postcranial skeleton ===
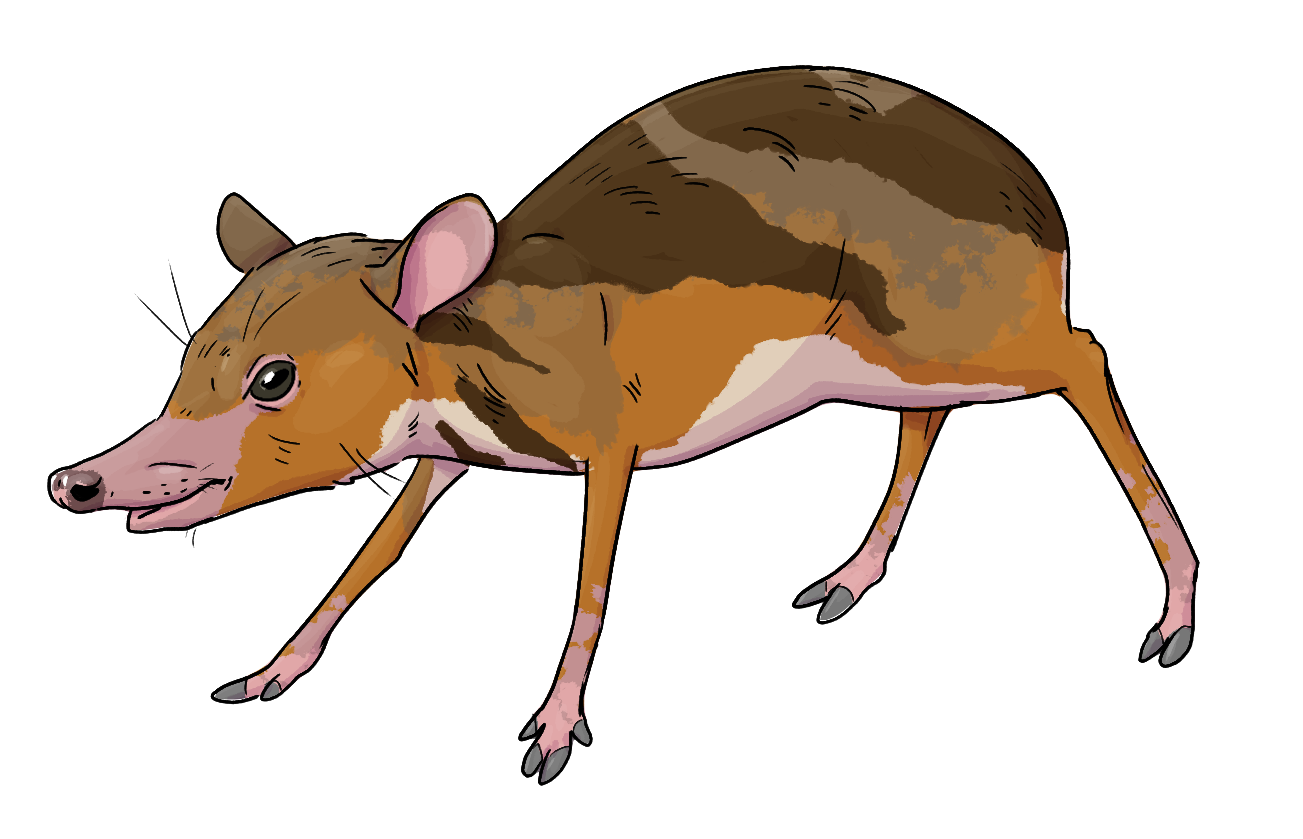
Restoration of A. murinus based on known fossil material

Amphimeryx is known from postcranial fossils from A. collotarsus in La Debruge and A. murinus in Escamps at France. Its most well-known trait is within the tarsus of its hind feet, in which the cuboid is fused to the navicular as a single bone, a trait convergent with those of ruminants. The fused "cubonavicular" is also known in Pseudamphimeryx. The metatarsal digits III and IV are elongated and partially fused to each other while the side digits II and V are greatly reduced to small, needlelike forms. In terms of the Escamps fossil, digit III measures 50 mm (1.969 in) long while digit II is no more than 14 mm (0.5512 in) long. These traits are similarly recorded in derived ruminants, which have tetradactyl (four-toed) feet, absent digit I, reduced digits II and V, and fused digits III and IV that make up the cannon bone (the now-extinct primitive ruminants had pentadactyl (five-toed) feet, unreduced digits II and V, and unfused digits III and IV). Like other artiodactyls with only two elongated digits in each foot (digits III and IV), Amphimeryx was functionally didactyl, meaning that it walked only on its two elongated toes per foot. The metatarsal digits of Amphimeryx are smaller in length than those of the basal ruminant Archaeomeryx but larger than those of another basal ruminant Hypertragulus.

The hind leg is known from complete fossil evidence from the locality of Escamps. The body of the femur has a slender and elongated shape with a slight arch. The femoral head is reduced in form while the greater trochanter is positioned as high as the head but is compressed in its mediolateral area. The trochanteric fossa of the greater trochanter is triangular, narrow, and deep in shape, being contained by two ridges. The tibia is long and slender, its tibial fossa being deep. The overall morphology of the tibia suggests that the fibula would have been greatly reduced. Similarly, derived ruminants have reduced fibulas that fuse with the tibia (in the front feet, the ulna fuses with the radius). The calcaneum is long and slender, its talar shelf being small and reduced. The astragalus is elongated, and its tubercle aligns with that of the calcaneum. The primitive state of the astragalus sets Amphimeryx apart from ruminants; the approximately equal sizes of its trochleas and more rounded edge of its sustentacular facet also sets the genus apart from the Cainotheriidae.

=== Size ===
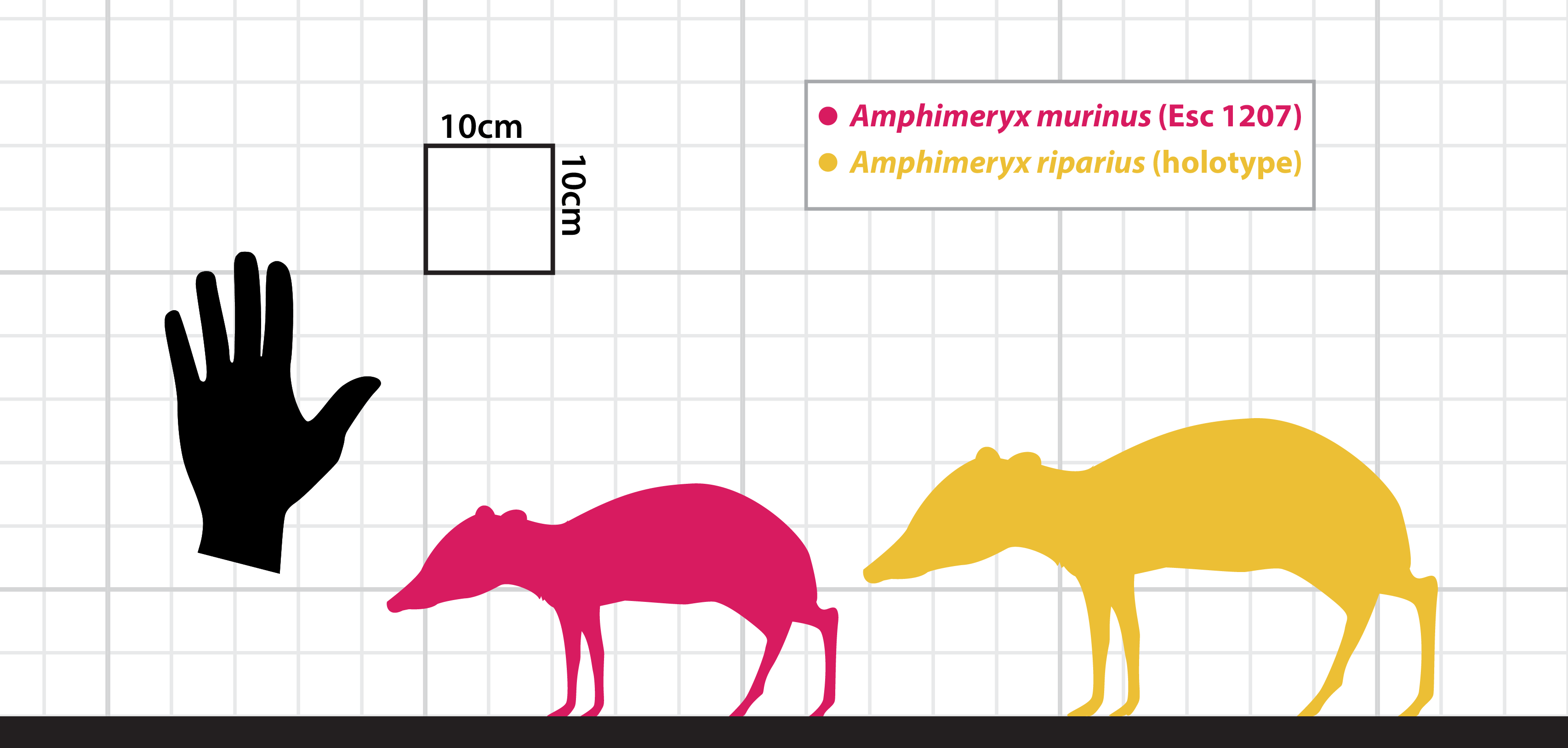
Estimated size comparisons of A. murinus and A. riparius based on known fossil remains

Species in the family Amphimerycidae are quite small compared to other artiodactyls. Weight estimates of Palaeogene artiodactyls performed by Jean-Noël Martinez and Sudre in 1995 made based on the dimensions of their M_{1} teeth and astragali yielded 1.846 kg (4.070 lb) and 1.511 kg (3.331 lb) respectively. The estimated body masses of Amphimeryx are small compared to most other Palaeogene artiodactyls in the study, although the researchers pointed out that the M_{1} measurements could be overestimated compared to the astragalus estimate.

In 2014, Takehisa Tsubamoto reexamined the relationship between astragalus size and estimated body mass based on extensive studies of extant terrestrial mammals, reapplying the methods to Palaeogene artiodactyls previously tested by Sudre and Martinez. The recalculations resulted in somewhat lower estimates compared to the 1995 results (with the exception of Diplobune minor, which has a shorter astragalus proportion than most other artiodactyls), displayed in the below graph:

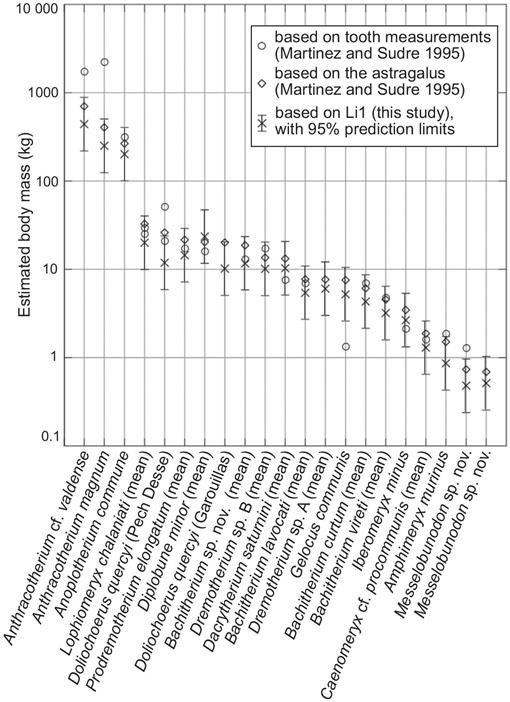
Estimated body masses (kg) of Palaeogene artiodactyls based on recalculated trochlear widths (Li1) in comparison to estimates from Martinez and Sudre (1995)

== Palaeoecology ==
=== Early pre–Grande Coupure Europe ===
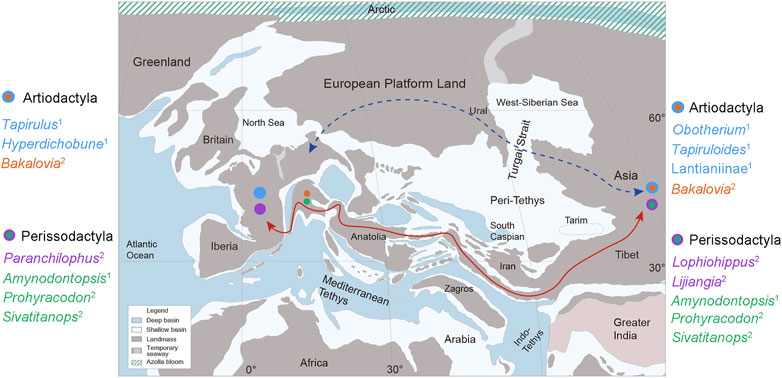
Palaeogeography of Europe and Asia during the Middle Eocene with possible artiodactyl and perissodactyl dispersal routes.

For much of the Eocene, a hothouse climate with humid, tropical environments with consistently high precipitations prevailed. Modern mammalian orders including Perissodactyla, Artiodactyla, and Primates were diversifying rapidly in the Early Eocene and developing dentitions specialized for folivory. The omnivorous forms mostly either switched to folivorous diets or went extinct by the Middle Eocene (47–37 Ma) along with the archaic "condylarths". By the Late Eocene (approx. 37–33 Ma), most of the ungulate form dentitions shifted from bunodont (or rounded) cusps to cutting ridges (i.e. lophs) for folivorous diets.

Land connections between western Europe and North America were interrupted around 53 Ma. From the Early Eocene up until the Grande Coupure extinction event (56–33.9 Ma), western Eurasia was separated into three landmasses: western Europe (an archipelago), Balkanatolia (in-between the Paratethys Sea of the north and the Neotethys Ocean of the south), and eastern Eurasia. The Holarctic mammalian faunas of western Europe were therefore mostly isolated from other landmasses including Greenland, Africa, and eastern Eurasia, allowing for endemism to develop. Therefore, the European mammals of the Late Eocene (MP17–MP20 of the Mammal Palaeogene zones) were mostly descendants of endemic Middle Eocene groups.

The first appearance of Amphimeryx by MP18 occurred long after the extinction of the endemic European perissodactyl family Lophiodontidae in MP16, including the largest lophiodont Lophiodon lautricense, which weighed over 2,000 kg (4,409 lb). The extinction of the Lophiodontidae was part of a faunal turnover, which likely was the result of a shift from humid and highly tropical environments to drier and more temperate forests with open areas and more abrasive vegetation. The surviving herbivorous fauna shifted their dentitions and dietary strategies accordingly to adapt to abrasive and seasonal vegetation. The environments were still subhumid and full of subtropical evergreen forests, however. The Palaeotheriidae was the sole remaining European perissodactyl group, and frugivorous-folivorous or purely folivorous artiodactyls became the dominant group in western Europe. MP16 also marked the last appearances of most European crocodylomorphs, of which the aligatoroid Diplocynodon was the only survivor due to seemingly adapting to the general decline of tropical climates of the Late Eocene.

=== Late Eocene ===
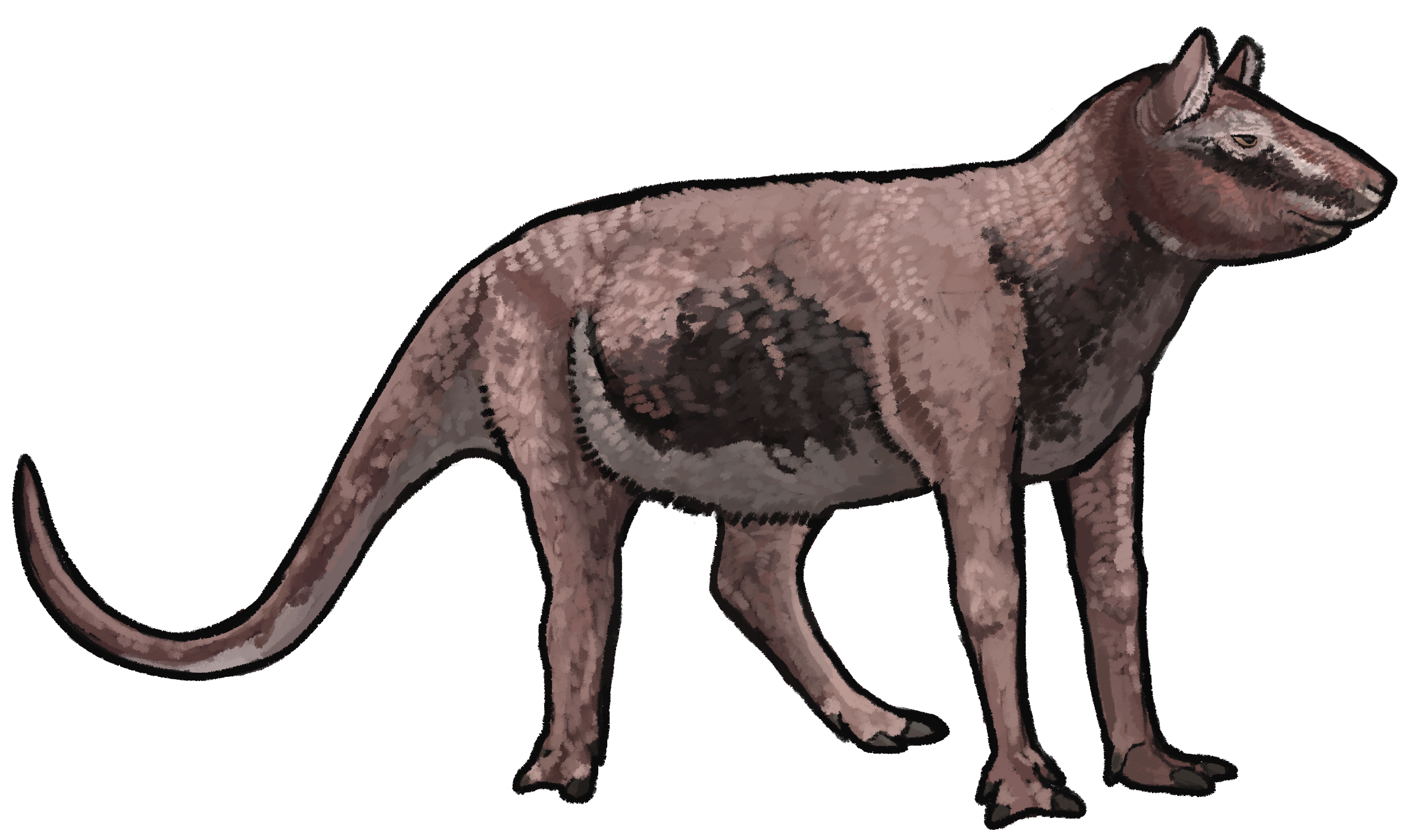
Restoration of Cebochoerus, which coexisted with Amphimeryx in western Europe

After the latest occurrence of Pseudamphimeryx in MP17b (37.5–37.0 Ma), Amphimeryx made its first temporal appearance in MP18 (37.0–35.0 Ma), in which both A. murinus and A. collotarsus (if the latter is valid) co-occur. It was exclusive to the western European archipelago and is known only from the Central European region, more specifically what is now France and Switzerland. Of note is that whereas Pseudamphimeryx is recorded from the United Kingdom, Amphimeryx is not.

Amphimeryx coexisted with a wide diversity of artiodactyls in western Europe by MP18, ranging from the more widespread Dichobunidae, Tapirulidae, and Anthracotheriidae to many other endemic families such as Xiphodontidae, Choeropotamidae, Cebochoeridae, Amphimerycidae, and Cainotheriidae. It also coexisted with palaeotheriids, the sole perissodactyl group of the Late Eocene of western Europe. Late Eocene European groups of the clade Ferae represented predominantly the Hyaenodonta (Hyaenodontinae, Hyainailourinae, and Proviverrinae) but also contained Carnivoramorpha (Miacidae) and Carnivora (small-sized Amphicyonidae). Other mammal groups present in the Late Eocene of western Europe represented the leptictidans (Pseudorhyncocyonidae), primates (Adapoidea and Omomyoidea), nyctitheriids, bats, herpetotheriids, apatemyids, and rodents (Pseudosciuridae, Theridomyidae, and Gliridae). The alligatoroid Diplocynodon, present only in Europe since the upper Paleocene, coexisted with pre-Grande Coupure faunas as well, likely consuming insects, fish, frogs, and eggs due to prey partitioning previously with other crocodylomorphs that had since died out by the Late Eocene.

The MP18 locality of La Débruge of France indicates that A. murinus coexisted with a wide variety of mammals, namely the herpetotheriid Peratherium, rodents (Blainvillimys, Theridomys, Plesiarctomys, Glamys), hyaenodonts (Hyaenodon and Pterodon), amphicyonid Cynodictis, palaeotheres (Plagiolophus, Anchilophus, Palaeotherium), dichobunid Dichobune, choeropotamid Choeropotamus, cebochoerids Cebochoerus and Acotherulum, anoplotheriids (Anoplotherium, Diplobune, Dacrytherium), tapirulid Tapirulus, xiphodonts Xiphodon and Dichodon, cainothere Oxacron, and the anthracothere Elomeryx. The MP19 locality of Escamps has similar faunas but also includes the herpetotheriid Amphiperatherium, pseudorhyncocyonid Pseudorhyncocyon, bats (Hipposideros, Vaylatsia, Vespertiliavus, Stehlinia), primates (Microchoerus, Palaeolemur), cainothere Paroxacron, and the xiphodont Haplomeryx.

== Extinction ==
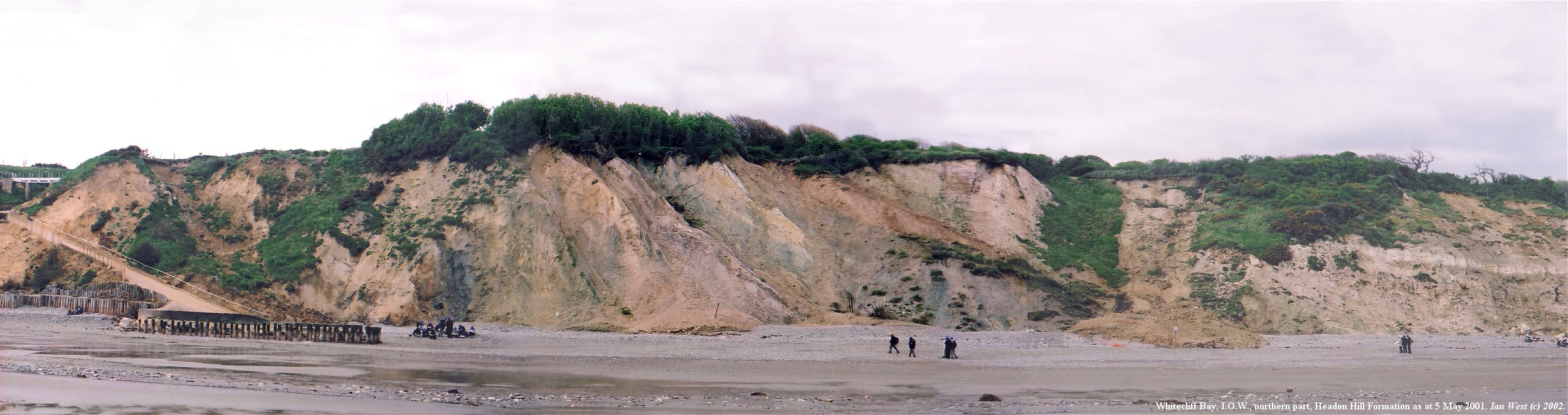
A panorama of the Headon Hill Formation in the Isle of Wight. The stratigraphy of it and the Bouldnor Formation led to better understandings of faunal chronologies from the Late Eocene up to the Grande Coupure.

The Grande Coupure event during the latest Eocene to earliest Oligocene (MP20–MP21, 34.0–32.5 Ma) is one of the largest and most abrupt faunal turnovers in the Cenozoic of Western Europe. The event led to the extinction of 60% of western European mammalian lineages, which were subsequently replaced with the arrival of later anthracotheres, entelodonts, ruminants (Gelocidae, Lophiomerycidae), rhinocerotoids (Rhinocerotidae, Amynodontidae, Eggysodontidae), carnivorans (Amphicyonidae, Amphicynodontidae, Nimravidae, and Ursidae), eastern Eurasian rodents (Eomyidae, Cricetidae, and Castoridae), and erinaceids. The Grande Coupure is often dated directly to the Eocene-Oligocene boundary at 33.9 Ma, although some estimate that the event began slightly later, around 33.6–33.4 Ma. It saw an abrupt shift from a hot greenhouse world that characterised much of the Palaeogene to a coolhouse/icehouse world from the Early Oligocene onwards. The massive drop in temperatures results from the first major expansion of the Antarctic ice sheets that caused drastic pCO_{2} decreases and an estimated drop of ~70 m (230 ft) in sea level.

Many palaeontologists agree that glaciation and the resulting drops in sea level allowed for increased migrations between Balkanatolia and western Europe. The Turgai Strait, which once separated much of Europe from Asia, is often proposed as the main European seaway barrier prior to the Grande Coupure, but some researchers challenged this perception recently, arguing that it completely receded already 37 Ma, long before the Eocene-Oligocene transition. In 2022, Alexis Licht et al. suggested that the Grande Coupure could have possibly been synchronous with the Oi-1 glaciation (33.5 Ma), which records a decline in atmospheric CO_{2}, boosting the Antarctic glaciation that already started by the Eocene-Oligocene transition.

MP20 (34.0–33.9 Ma) marks the last known appearance of A. murinus, but A. riparius apparently survived until the MP21 (33.9–32.5 Ma) at the French locality of Ronzon. Many other artiodactyl genera from western Europe went extinct as a result of the Grande Coupure; the Ronzon locality indicates that the Amphimeryx may have survived the event but went extinct not long after. The causes of the extinctions of Amphimeryx and many other mammals in western Europe have been attributed to negative interactions with immigrant fauna, environmental changes from cooling climates, or some combination of the two.
