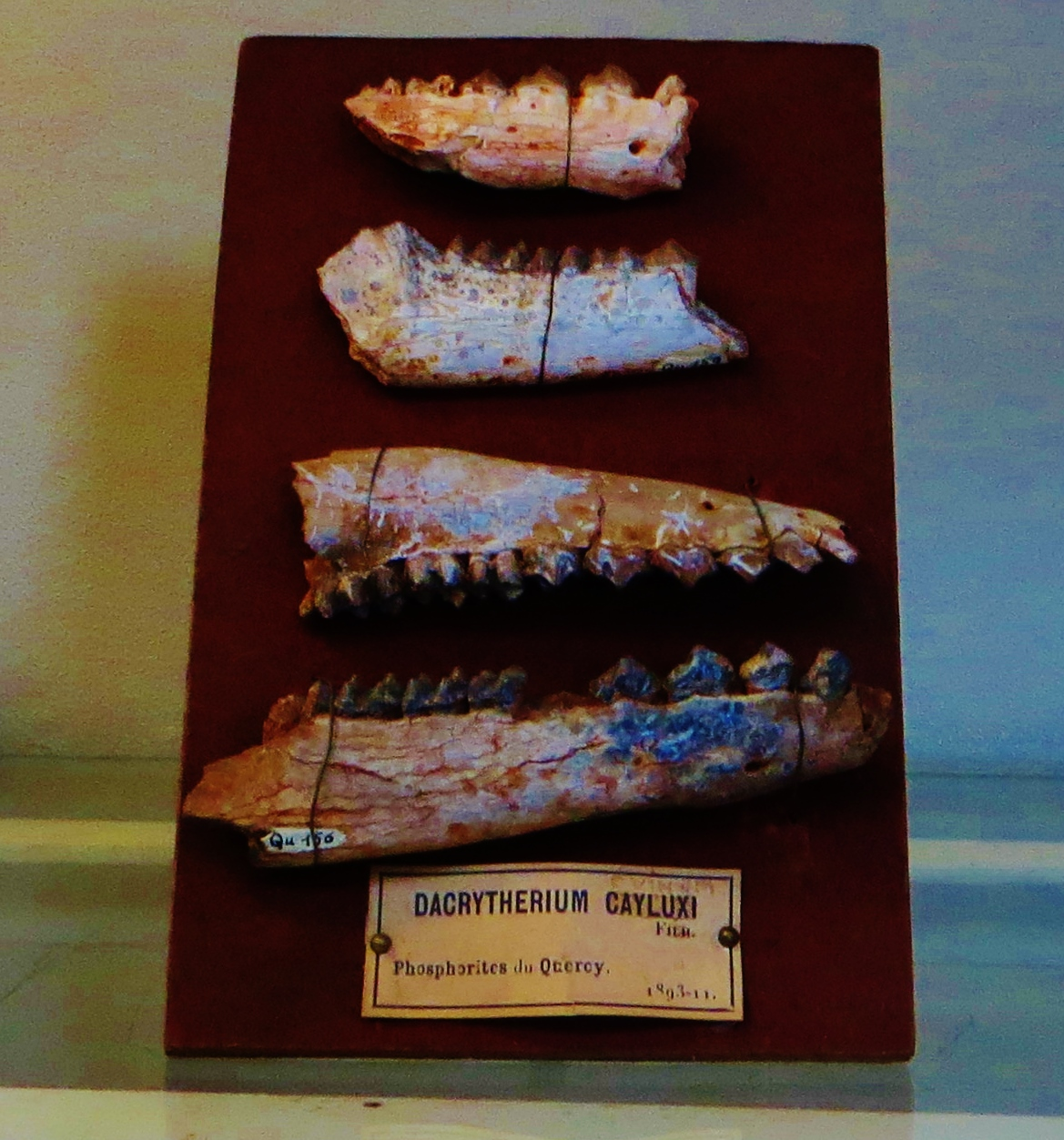
- Dacrytherium ovinum mandibles, National Museum of Natural History, France

Scientific classification
- Kingdom: Animalia
- Phylum: Chordata
- Class: Mammalia
- Order: Artiodactyla
- Family: †Anoplotheriidae
- Subfamily: †Dacrytheriinae
- Genus: †Dacrytherium; Filhol, 1876

Type species
- †Dichobune ovina (= †Dacrytherium ovinum) Owen, 1857

Other species
- †D. elegans Filhol, 1884; †D. priscum Stehlin, 1910; †D. saturnini Stehlin, 1910

Synonyms
- Genus synonymy: Plesydacrytherium Filhol, 1880; Plesidacrytherium Filhol, 1884; Synonyms of D. ovinum: Dichobune ovina Owen, 1854; Dacrytherium anthracoides Filhol, 1876; Dacrytherium cayluxi Filhol, 1877; Dacrytherium ovinus Lydekker, 1885; Dacrytherium cayluxense Lydekker, 1885

= Dacrytherium =

Dacrytherium Temporal range: Middle Eocene to Late Eocene 44.9–34 Ma

Extinct genus of endemic Palaeogene European artiodactyls

Dacrytherium (Ancient Greek: δάκρυ (tear, teardrop) + θήρ (beast or wild animal) meaning "tear beast") is an extinct genus of Palaeogene artiodactyls belonging to the family Anoplotheriidae. It occurred from the Middle to Late Eocene of Western Europe and is the type genus of the subfamily Dacrytheriinae, the older of the two anoplotheriid subfamilies. Dacrytherium was first erected in 1876 by the French palaeontologist Henri Filhol, who recognised in his studies that it had dentition similar to the anoplotheriids Anoplotherium and Diplobune but differed from them by a deep preorbital fossa and a lacrimal fossa, the latter of which is where the genus name derives from. D. ovinum, originally classified in Dichobune, is the type species of Dacrytherium. Henri Filhol named D. elegans in 1884, and Hans Georg Stehlin named the species D. priscum and D. saturnini in 1910.

Dacrytherium was a medium-sized artiodactyl that is defined by specific dental traits separating it from the Anoplotheriinae. Typically, its species have deep preorbital fossae that anoplotheriines lack entirely, although the depression of D. elegans is different from other species. Its dental and cranial anatomies, however, were otherwise typical of the Anoplotheriidae, which led to historic confusions regarding whether Dacrytherium belonged to the Anoplotheriidae or its own family. It is also recognised as having two evolutionary paths in the forms of D. elegans-D. saturnini and D. priscum-D. ovinum given the anatomical changes and size increases of dentitions over time, although the researcher who proposed the lineages later expressed doubt that the validity of the latter.

Dacrytherium lived in western Europe during a period when the region was an archipelago isolated from the rest of Eurasia. Contemporary species from this region were not widely dispersed due to high levels of endemism. It co-existed with a wide variety of artiodactyls and perissodactyls in subtropical-tropical environments that supported frugivorous-folivorous mammals. Dacrytherium itself was likely folivorous, but its lifestyle is unknown given the general scarcity of post-cranial evidence and the unusual variations of hypothesized behaviours in the derived anoplotheriines Anoplotherium and Diplobune.

== Taxonomy ==
=== Taxonomic history ===
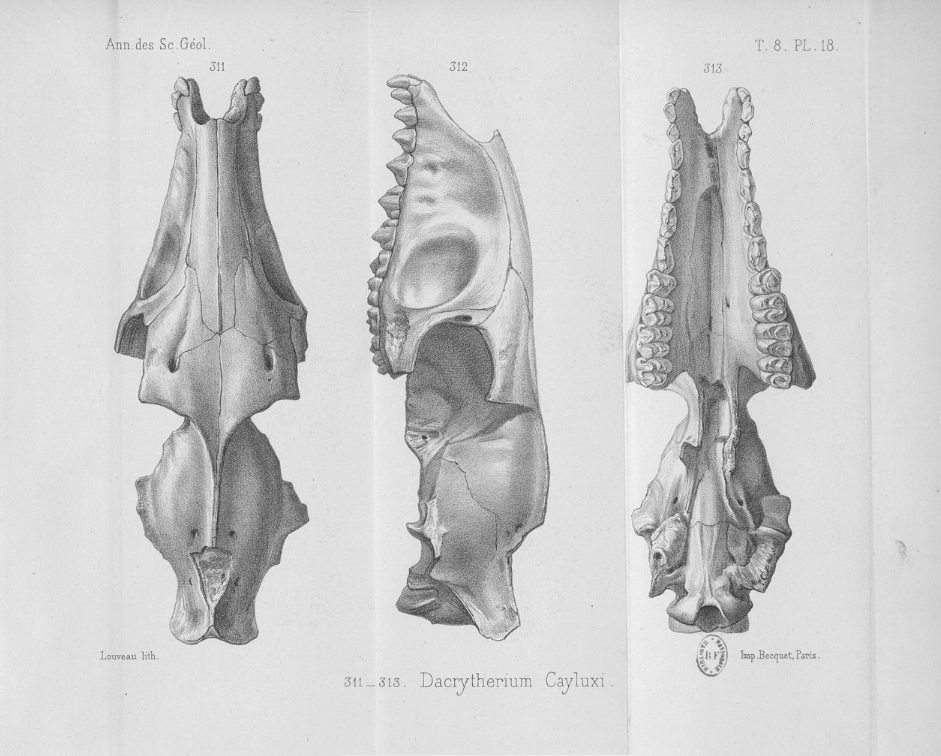
Upper skull of Dacrytherium ovinum found in 1876, as illustrated in 1877

In 1876, French palaeontologist Henri Filhol described fossils from recent excavations at the phosphorite deposits of Quercy in France, including bones that he identified as belonging to new genera or species. One identified "pachyderm" has a dental formula, for the incisors, canines, and molars, of 3.1.73.1.7, which he considered similar to other fossil mammal genera like Anthracotherium. The specimen was a complete skull with a "peculiar" upper jaw and a lower jaw and all of its teeth. From the skull, he erected the genus name Dacrytherium and established the species D. anthracoides. The same year, French palaeontologist Paul Gervais compared Dacrytherium to hipparionines and merycoidodonts based on the upper maxilla of the complete skull having a similarly deep lateral (or outer) hollowing. The etymology of the genus name derives in Greek from "dacry(o)" (tear, teardrop in reference to lacrimation) and "thḗr" (beast or wild animal) meaning "tear beast", referencing the lacrimal fossa and its function for hosting the lacrimal sac that drains teardrops from the eye's surface.

In 1877, Filhol retained the genus name but replaced the species name D. anthracoides with D. cayluxi, creating figures for the skull of the species. He emphasized that the upper complete skull of Dacrytherium that he found from the Lamandine-Haute deposits in 1876 had a lower jaw and some leg bones that potentially belonged to it. Filhol determined that its dental formula was 3.1.4.33.1.4.3. The dentition, he said, was more similar to Anoplotherium and Diplobune than Xiphodon.

Filhol described another small species of "pachyderm" from the phosphorites of Lamandine-Haute in 1884 based on a fragment of a skull with premolars and molars. He stated that it was very similar to Anoplotherium, that the first and second premolars were nearly identical to those of Dacrytherium. Based on very specific molar differences, however, he proposed the genus and species name Plesidacrytherium elegans. Like Dacrytherium, the palaeontologist said, P. elegans presented a depression at the area of the infraorbital foramen up the upper maxilla. Filhol already created the name "Plesydacrytherium elegans" as early as 1880, but it lacked any actual definition to make it valid. The genus name derived in Ancient Greek from "plēsíon" (near), "dacry(o)" (tear), and "thḗr" (beast or wild animal) meaning "near tear beast".

British naturalist Richard Lydekker reviewed known species of anoplotheriids in 1885. Previously in 1857, Richard Owen described a purported anoplotheroid the size of Xiphodon gracilis from the Isle of Wight. Owen then determined that because of its dentition corresponding more to Dichobune than to Xiphodon and Dichodon, the specimens belonged to the newly erected Dichobune ovina (Note: Taxonomists have emended species names such as D. ovinum/D. ovinus/D. ovina. The suffixes of species names should agree in linguistic gender with that of the genus, and where they disagree the ending of the species name must be changed.). Lydekker determined that Dichobune ovinus actually belonged to Dacrytherium. He then said that Dacrytherium ovinum was a larger form of D. cayluxi. In addition, he considered that "Xiphodon platyceps" may be the same as D. ovinum.

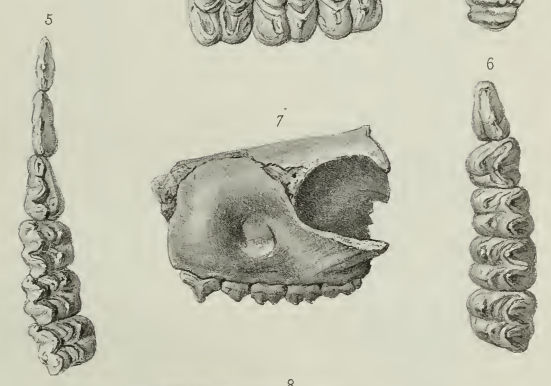
Skull fragment and dental remains of D. elegans

In 1891–1893, German palaeontologist Karl Alfred von Zittel synonymized Mixtotherium and Plesidacrytherium with Diplobune, and Adrotherium (species A. depressum) with Dacrytherium. He supported the validity of D. cayluxense and D. ovinum as well as the synonymy of "X. platyceps" with the latter species. However, in 1892, Lydekker made reviews of the species of Dacrytherium. He contextualized that his 1885 reassignment of Dichobune ovina to Dacrytherium was based on the dental series of a cranium. At that time, he thought that D. cayluxense was one of two distinct species of Dacrytherium because he thought that the former differed from the latter based on dental differences including the canines. However, before Lydekker wrote his 1892 article, Arthur Smith Woodward presented him with more fossil evidence from the French phosphorites including a well-preserved mandible of D. cayluxi, leading him to synonymize it with D. ovinum. In addition, Lydekker considered his previous synonymy of X. platyceps with Dacrytherium "unfounded" since the former clearly lacked any lacrimal fossa that the latter has.

In 1908, Hans Georg Stehlin synonymized Adrotherium with Mixtotherium instead of Dacrytherium. In 1910, Stehlin reaffirmed the validity of Mixtotherium but synonymized Plesidacrytherium with Dacrytherium, reclassifying its species to D. elegans. He synonymized "X. platyceps" with Dichodon cuspidatum because of their close dentitions combined with the former lacking the preorbital fossa that Dacrytherium has. In his revisions of the Palaeogene artiodactyls, he erected two more species of Dacrytherium: D. priscum and D. saturnini. The name D. priscum refers to a larger species of the genus. According to Stehlin, Ludwig Rütimeyer knew of specimens of Dacrytherium in 1891 but doubted that it actually belonged to the genus based on Lydekker's specimen illustrations, a conclusion that Stehlin considered a mistake. The second species D. saturnini was also based on specific cranial plus dental differences and was named after the locality of Saint-Saturnin-lès-Apt in the department of Vaucluse, France where the fossils came from.

=== Classification ===
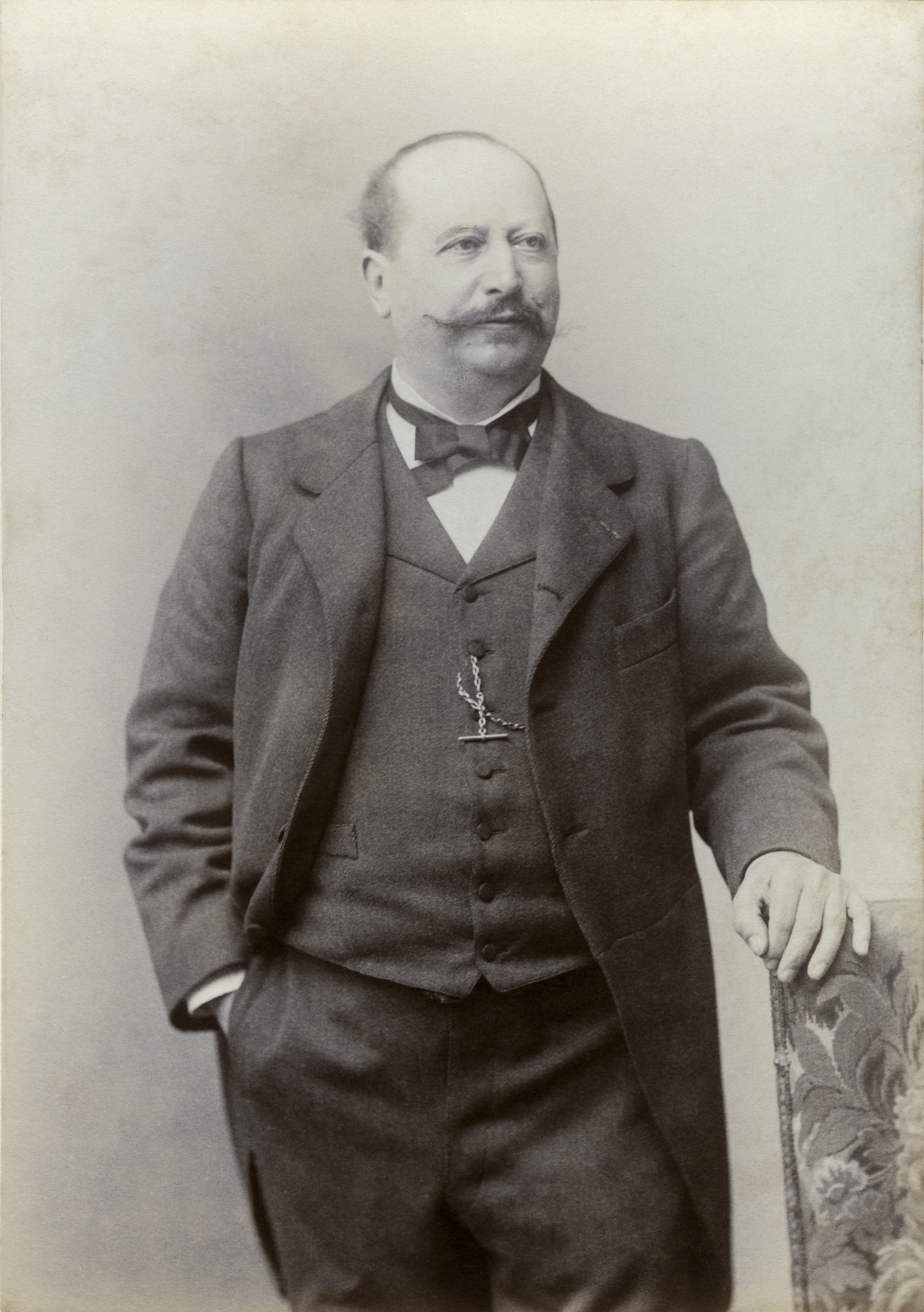
Portrait of Henri Filhol, who erected the genus Dacrytherium in 1876 and gave more thorough descriptions of it in 1877

Dacrytherium is the type genus of the subfamily Dacrytheriinae, which belongs to the Palaeogene artiodactyl family Anoplotheriidae. The family was endemic to western Europe and lived from the middle Eocene to the early Oligocene (~44 to 30 Ma, possible earliest record at ~48 Ma). The exact evolutionary origins and dispersals of the anoplotheriids are uncertain, but they exclusively resided within the continent when it was an archipelago that was isolated by seaway barriers from other regions such as Balkanatolia and the rest of eastern Eurasia. The Anoplotheriidae's relations with other members of the Artiodactyla are not well-resolved, with some determining it to be either a tylopod (which includes camelids and merycoidodonts of the Palaeogene) or a close relative to the infraorder and some others believing that it may have been closer to the Ruminantia (which includes tragulids and other close Palaeogene relatives).

The history of dacrytheriines has been contentious as a result of disagreements as to whether they constitute a subfamily of the Anoplotheriidae or a distinct family named "Dacrytheriidae". The family name was first proposed by Charles Depéret in 1917; some palaeontologists like Jean Sudre in 1978 opted to follow the family rank while some others like Jerry J. Hooker in 1986 considered the clade to be an anoplotheriid subfamily. A 2007 source supports dacrytheriines as a subfamily based on recent phylogenetic analyses determining that Dacrytherium falls within the Anoplotheriidae. It is one of two subfamilies of the Anoplotheriidae, the other being the Anoplotheriinae.

The Dacrytheriinae is the older anoplotheriid subfamily, but the actual first appearance by Mammal Palaeogene zone range is uncertain. The first undisputed appearance of anoplotheriids is by MP13, but their range may have extended, in the case of Catodontherium, into MP11 or even MP10. Dacrytherium itself made its first undisputed appearance by MP13 as an artiodactyl leaning towards bunoselenodont dentition. The younger subfamily Anoplotheriinae made their first appearances by the late Eocene (MP15-MP16), or ~41-40 Ma, within western Europe with Duerotherium and Robiatherium. After a significant gap of anoplotheriines in MP17a-MP17b, the derived anoplotheriids Anoplotherium and Diplobune made their first appearances in western Europe by MP18, although their exact origins are unknown. The Dacrytheriinae has recently been suggested to have been a paraphyletic subfamily based on dental morphology from which the Anoplotheriinae stemmed, but further research is required to confirm if this is true.

Conducting studies focused on the phylogenetic relations within the Anoplotheriidae has proven difficult due to the general scarcity of fossil specimens of most genera. The phylogenetic relations of the Anoplotheriidae as well as the Xiphodontidae, Mixtotheriidae, and Cainotheriidae have also been elusive due to the selenodont morphologies of the molars, which were convergent with tylopods or ruminants. Some researchers considered the selenodont families Anoplotheriidae, Xiphodontidae, and Cainotheriidae to be within Tylopoda due to postcranial features that were similar to the tylopods from North America in the Palaeogene. Other researchers tie them as being more closely related to ruminants than tylopods based on dental morphology. Different phylogenetic analyses have produced different results for the "derived" selenodont Eocene European artiodactyl families, making it uncertain whether they were closer to the Tylopoda or Ruminantia.

In an article published in 2019, Romain Weppe et al. conducted a phylogenetic analysis on the Cainotherioidea within the Artiodactyla based on mandibular and dental characteristics, specifically in terms of relationships with artiodactyls of the Palaeogene. The results retrieved that the superfamily was closely related to the Mixtotheriidae and Anoplotheriidae. They determined that the Cainotheriidae, Robiacinidae, Anoplotheriidae, and Mixtotheriidae formed a clade that was the sister group to the Ruminantia while Tylopoda, along with the Amphimerycidae and Xiphodontidae, split earlier in the tree. The phylogenetic tree published in the article and another work about the cainotherioids is outlined below:

- - Eurodexis russelli
  - Dichobune leporina
  - - - Amphimeryx murinus
      - - Xiphodon castrense
        - Tylopoda
          - Paratoceras coatesi
          - Eotylopus reedi
    - - Ruminantia
        - Parvitragulus priscus
        - - Lophiomeryx chalaniati
          - Archaeomeryx optatus
      - - Mixtotheriidae
          Mixtotherium cuspidatum
        - Anoplotheriidae
          - Anoplotherium latipes
          - Dacrytherium ovinum
        - Cainotherioidea
          - Robiacinidae
            - Robiacina lavergnesis
            - - Robiacina minuta
              - Robiacina quercyi
          - Cainotheriidae
            - Palembertina deplasi
            - - Oxacroninae
                - Paroxacron bergeri
                - - Paroxacron valdense
                  - Oxacron courtoisii
              - Cainotheriinae
                - Cainotherium laticurvatum
                - - Caenomeryx
                    - Caenomeryx filholi
                    - Caenomeryx procommunis
                  - Plesiomeryx
                    - Plesiomeryx cadurcensis
                    - Plesiomeryx huerzeleri

In 2020, Vincent Luccisano et al. created a phylogenetic tree of the basal artiodactyls, a majority endemic to western Europe, from the Palaeogene. In one clade, the "bunoselenodont endemic European" Mixtotheriidae, Anoplotheriidae, Xiphodontidae, Amphimerycidae, Cainotheriidae, and Robiacinidae are grouped together with the Ruminantia. The phylogenetic tree as produced by the authors is shown below:

- Artiodactyla
  - Bunophorus
  - - Gunophorus
    - Diacodexis
  - - - Protodichobune
      - Eurodexis
    - - - Buxobune
        - - Mouillacitherium
          - Meniscodon
        - - - Hyperdichobune
            - - Dichobune robertiana
              - - Dichobune leporina
                - - Homacodon
                  - - Gobiohyus
                    - Suina
                      - - Khirtharia
                        - Entelodon
                      - - Palaeocheorus
                        - Perchoerus
          - - Haplobunodontidae
              - Haplobunodon
              - - Cuisitherium
                - Lophiobunodon
            - - Mixtotherium
              - - Robiacina
                - - - - Dacrytherium
                      - Diplobune
                    - - Xiphodon
                      - Paraxiphodon
                  - - - Cainotherium
                      - Paroxacron
                    - - Archaeomeryx
                      - - Amphimeryx
                        - Pseudamphimeryx
      - - Aumelasia
        - - - Hallebune
            - Amphirhagatherium
          - - Cebochoeridae
              - Cebochoerus
              - Gervachoerus
            - - Choeropotamus
              - Siamotherium

In 2022, Weppe created a phylogenetic analysis in his academic thesis regarding Palaeogene artiodactyl lineages, focusing most specifically on the endemic European families. The phylogenetic tree, according to Weppe, is the first to conduct phylogenetic affinities of all anoplotheriid genera, although not all individual species were included. He found that the Anoplotheriidae, Mixtotheriidae, and Cainotherioidea form a clade based on synapomorphic dental traits (traits thought to have originated from their most recent common ancestor). The result, Weppe mentioned, matches up with previous phylogenetic analyses on the Cainotherioidea with other endemic European Palaeogene artiodactyls that support the families as a clade. As a result, he argued that the proposed superfamily Anoplotherioidea, composing of the Anoplotheriidae and Xiphodontidae as proposed by Alan W. Gentry and Hooker in 1988, is invalid due to the polyphyly of the lineages in the phylogenetic analysis. However, the Xiphodontidae was still found to compose part of a wider clade with the three other groups. He also proposed that Leptotheridium, previously relocated from the "Dacrytheriidae" to the Xiphodontidae, forms part of a paraphyletic anoplotheriid clade with the dacrytheriines Catodontherium and Dacrytherium.

== Description ==
=== Skull ===
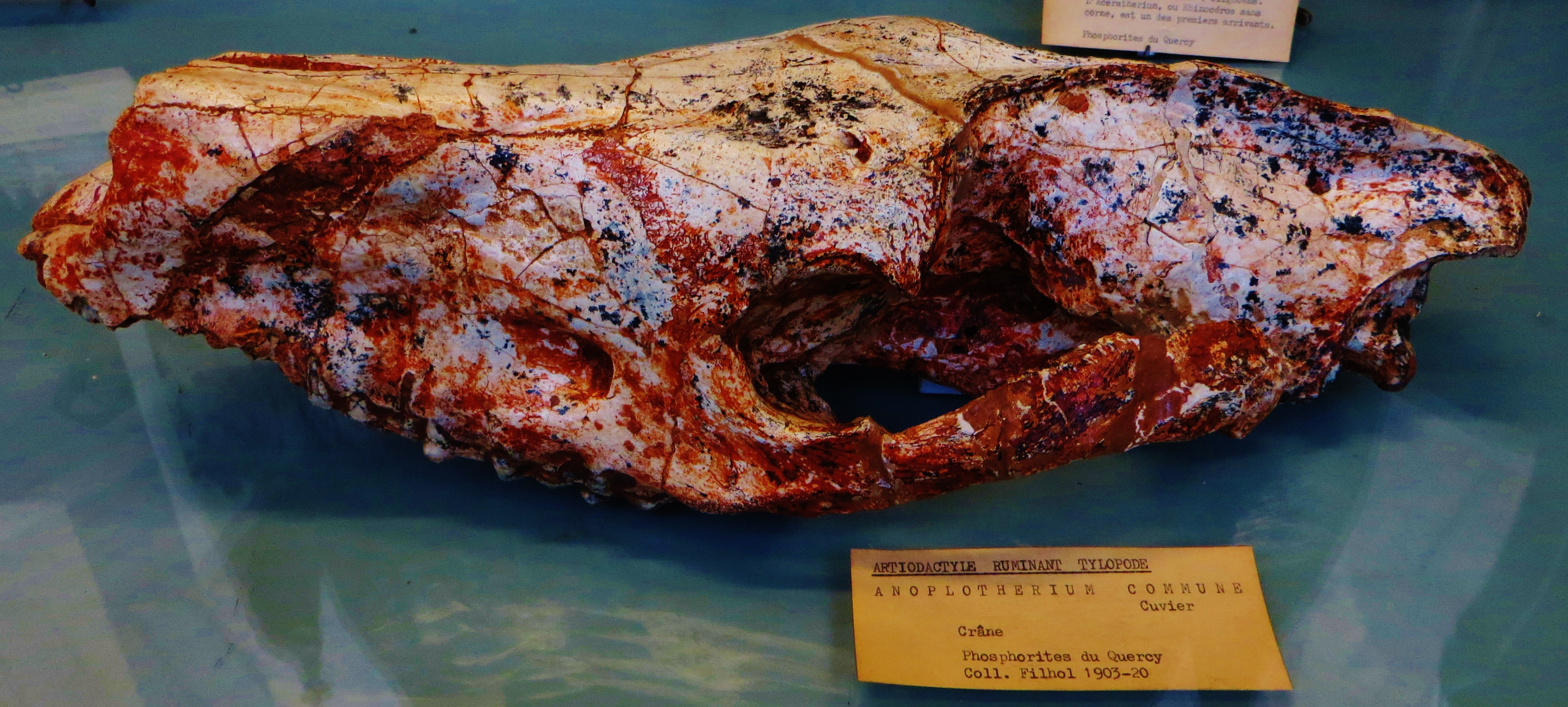
Upper skull of the closely related Anoplotherium commune, National Museum of Natural History, France. Note the lack of any preorbital fossa unlike that of Dacrytherium.

Dacrytherium has fairly complete skull material since 1876 and is best known for its large-sized lacrimal fossa in front of its eye, or "tear pit", hence the derivation of the genus name. Such a depression as seen in Dacrytherium occurs in extant and extinct ruminants of the clade Pecora as well as in many merycoidodonts. Dacrytherium is also known by the presence of a preorbital fossa, a feature where the preorbital gland is located in living animals; it is also present in some extant artiodactyls including bovids and deer. The preorbital fossae, which occupy the maxillae, were suggested by Nelly Delmont in 1941 to have no close analogues even amongst other mammals with preorbital fossae. The infraorbital foramina are close to the orbits of the eyes and are connected to the preorbital fossa as a sac-like extension. The deep preorbital fossa is present in all species except D. elegans, whose preorbital fossa is not as deep.

Jerry J. Hooker and Marc Weidmann suggested that the trait supports the possibility of the D. elegans-D. saturnini and D. priscum-D. ovinum lineages having independently acquired the trait. The deep preorbital fossa, well-pronounced in the genus, is not present in the anoplotheriines Anoplotherium and Diplobune. Historically the trait, along with the fusion of the front internal cusps in the lower molar teeth, were used to justify Dacrytherium as being a different evolutionary lineage from other anoplotheres. Otherwise, however, the skull of Dacrytherium is so similar to those of the anoplotheriines that Helga Sharpe Pearson questioned Dacrytherium being considered "evolutionarily separate" from anoplotheriines in 1927.

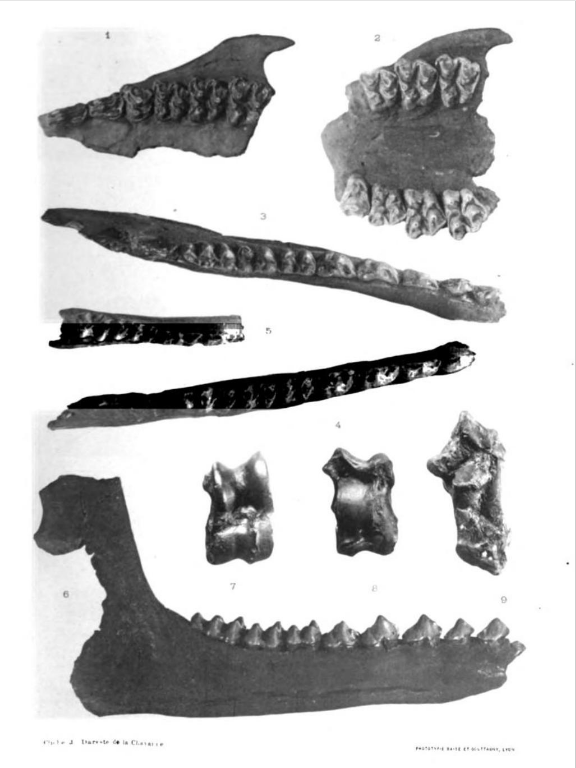
D. ovinum mandibles and calcaneus. The astragalus, initially thought to belong to the genus, was later reclassified as belonging to Choeropotamus.

The modern-day diagnoses of Dacrytherium include a low-positioned roof of the cranium, an elongated and transversely developed muzzle with a wide and empty preorbital space, a lack of any postorbital bar structure, and the mastoid part of the temporal bone being exposed in the outer area between the exoccipital part of the occipital bone and the squamosal bone. The skull of Dacrytherium is overall similar in structure to Anoplotherium with one main difference being the robust build of the larger skull of Anoplotherium for supporting stronger muscles. Pearson stressed that such differences do not separate the close affinities of the two genera, similar to how larger species of Mixtotherium are still close in affinity to smaller species despite their different builds or how tiger skulls are still similar to those of house cats.

The skull of D. ovinum is triangular in shape and elongated in terms of the snout while the back area is fusiform, meaning that it has a spindle-like shape with a wide middle area. It has a strong and high sagittal crest that is formed by the suture of the two parietal bones. The crest joins both the external occipital protuberance and upper nuchal lines at right angles. The zygomatic arch is thin and very prominent, standing out amongst the skull. The supraoccipital (or upper part of the occipital) is not very broad but extends through the back edge of the skull until the end of the paroccipital process (or projection). The parietal bones are united by curvy or sinuous sutures to the supraoccipital, frontal, temporal, and alisphenoid bones. The frontal bones are at first narrow but quickly widen, are pierced by supraorbital foramen, and laterally border the orbits.

Dacrytherium has a broad mastoid part of the temporal bone for separating the exoccipital and squamosal bones that begins as a narrow bone strip on the occiput bone's edge, equivalent in position with the squamosal suture. The mastoid then broadens on the underside, down to the outer paroccipital process, as a sharp ridge then divides it into an upper portion and lower portion. The ridge is behind the mastoid's suture with a small process of the squamosal bone after the eardrum. The tympanohyal pit of the hyoid arch is in front of the stylomastoid foramen and behind the mastoid. The pit is positioned in an angle between the tympanic (eardrum) neck and the rear area of the tympanic part of the temporal bone.

In the mandible, the mandibular condyle is high and above the edge of the alveolar process. The coronoid process of the mandible is separated from the articulating condyle. The external face of the mandible is hollowed from a deep masseteric fossa, and under the condyle is a clear pterygoid processes of the sphenoid. On the internal face, the angle of the mandible contains two facet joints for where the medial pterygoid muscle ends. The mandibular fossa is large, shallow, and limited in its back area by a pronounced process from the postglenoid process of the squamosal. The postglenoid process is narrow and pierced from behind by a large postglenoid foramen, one of the main skull passageways for veins.

=== Endocast anatomy ===
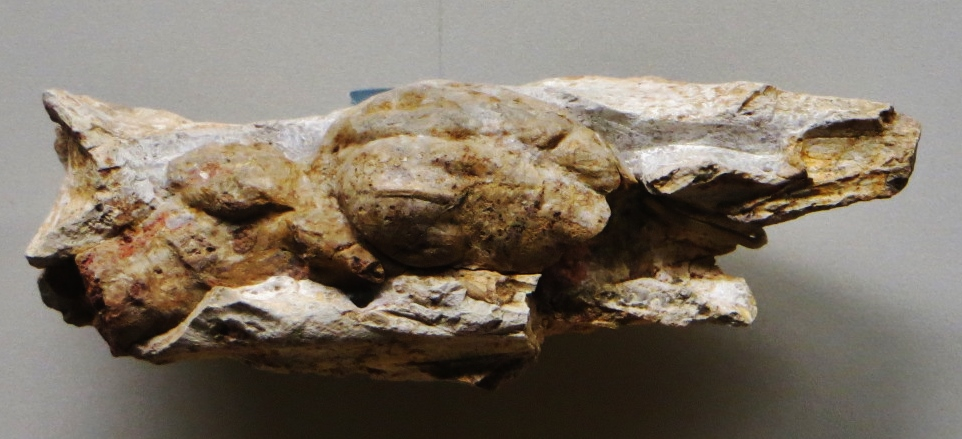
Endocranial cast of the related Diplobune, State Museum of Natural History Stuttgart

Based on two brain endocasts of the genus, one of D. ovinum and another of D. cf. ovinum, Colette Dechaseaux determined that their brains lacked flexure parts and had a lowered shape. Many of the brain features of the genus were identified by the palaeoneurologist as being typical of anoplotheriids. The rhinal sulcus is not in any angled shape, and the neocortex's furrows do not form circle arcs but instead form "longitudinal" arcs. The foramen of the lower face of the brain are arranged distant from each other and in order.

The cerebellum of the brain has well-developed cerebral hemispheres, is separated by a deep and large depression, and has a protruding cerebellar vermis with a well-pronounced primary fissure of cerebellum for emphasizing a greatly developed paleocerebellum. Similarly, the neocerebellum and paleocerebellum are both large, but the neocerebellum is longer than the paleocerebellum and is curvy because it tilts slightly to the right, then returns back, and finally reverses back to the sagittal plane of the brain. The transverse swellings in relief are marked on the neocerebellum. The cerebellar hemispheres are lower in position than the vermis and contains a large superior petrosal sinus on the surface in an arclike form, which is attached to the base of the neocerebellum but gradually moves away from it in the front area. It is above an extensive, irregular, and convex surface which, at the front area, detaches from the flocculus of the cerebellum.

In the cerebrum, its cerebral hemispheres quickly enlarge from a quarter of their lengths at their front end then gradually reach their maximum widths at about four-fifths of their lengths. To their fronts is a narrow and cut short frontal lobe as well as a long and detached temporal lobe at their upper surfaces. The rhinal fissure on the cerebrum, located on the upper face of the brain based on the cast, sets the boundaries of a small neocortex of a large rhinencephalon that is not clearly visible in upper views. The fissure is halted on the left side and continues on the right, but it has a distinctive trace of its two portions, known as the anterior (front) rhinal and the posterior (back) rhinal. The anterior rhinal is marked deep and is strongly convex on is underside, with the neocortex projecting above it and overhanging the rhinecephalon so that only a small amount of the neocortex is visible. The posterior rhinal, although also well-marked, is not as deep as its counterpart, is rectilinear in shape of its front portion, and is raised in its rear portion towards its upper surface. The rhinencephalon has a large piriform cortex in both length and height when observed laterally.

The neocortex is smoothened, although the texture is not necessarily identical on the left and right. A short and rectilinear furrow, distant from the sagittal sinus, runs diagonally from the front area to the back area towards the medial axis of the brain. Another furrow known as the suprasylvian sulcus (or suprasylvia) is slightly convex in the lower face of the brain and extends to the right up side to an upper depression. The suprasylvia then curves and connects to a short furrow located on the frontal lobe, interpreted by Colette Dechaseaux as the coronal sulcus. The elongated lateral sulcus, suprasylvia, and coronal sulcus as well as a small and oblique sulcus are said to be very similar to those of cainotherioids from their "cainotherioid plan" features.

=== Dentition ===
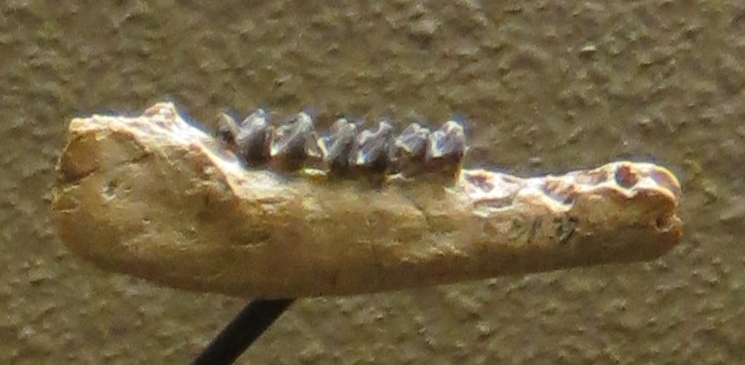
Mandible of D. priscum with molars, Natural History Museum of Basel

The dental formula of Dacrytherium and other anoplotheriids is 3.1.4.33.1.4.3 for a total of 44 teeth, consistent with the primitive dental formula for early-middle Palaeogene placental mammals. Anoplotheriids have selenodont (crescent-shaped ridge form) or bunoselenodont (bunodont and selenodont) premolars (P/p) and molars (M/m) made for leaf-browsing diets. The canines (C/c) of the Anoplotheriidae are overall undifferentiated from the incisors (I/i). The lower premolars of the family are piercing and elongated. The upper molars are bunoselenodont in form while the lower molars have selenodont labial cuspids and bunodont (or rounded) lingual cuspids. The subfamily Anoplotheriinae differs from the Dacrytheriinae by the lack of both molariform upper premolars with crescent-shaped paraconules and the lower molars with a third cusp between the metaconid and entoconid.

Dacrytherium has various specific dental diagnoses, some of which are similar to other anoplotheriids and some others of which are unique. Its upper incisors (I^{1}-I^{3}) are triangular in shape. The canines (C) are undifferentiated, typical of the Anoplotheriidae. The P^{1}-P^{3} are elongated in size and have poorly-developed lingual lobes (or divisions). The P^{4} is also triangular and has a crescent-shaped lingual cusp. The P_{1}-P_{3} are narrow and sharp while the P_{4} has a metaconid cusp that is distolingual in position to the protoconid cusp and has a weak paraconid cusp that is divided into two branches. The molars of Dacrytherium are "pentacuspidate", meaning that they have five cusps. In them, the parastyle cusp is connected to a prominent parastyle cusp, the labial sides of the paracone cusp and metacone cusp slightly ridged, and mesostyle cusps are loop-shaped. The lower molars each have two labial, crescent-shaped cusps and three lingual cusps for a total of five, with the postcristid and paracristid cusps extending lingually.

In regards to the occlusion of teeth, the cusps of the lower teeth fit easily into the depressions of the upper teeth, a trait apparently well-pronounced especially in its premolars. The occlusion of Dacrytherium, according to Nelly Delmont, is similar to those of the Suidae, the main difference being that Dacrytherium lacks cutting-edge teeth.

=== Limbs ===
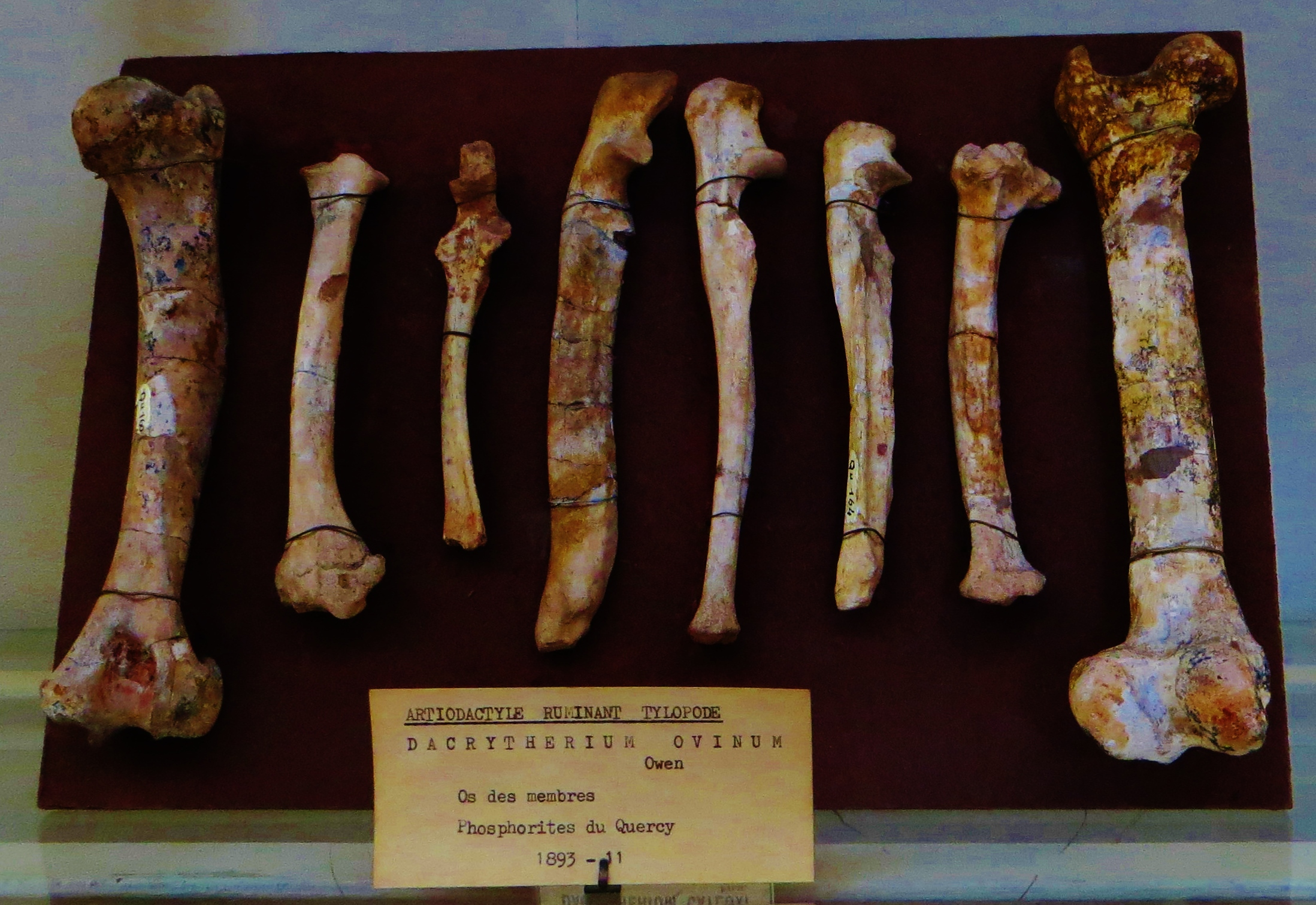
Limb bones referred to D. ovinum, National Museum of Natural History, France. Dacrytheriine postcranial remains are typically rare.

Due to the lack of clear evidence of the phalanges of Dacrytherium as opposed to its relatives Anoplotherium and Diplobune, speculations of the number of fingers it had ranged from three fingers to four fingers in the 19th–20th centuries. While not rich in postcranial evidence like Anoplotherium or Diplobune, Dacrytherium is known from some limb bones, including astragali in the cases of D. elegans and D. ovinum.

Several limb bones of Dacrytherium were first described by Depéret in 1917. The calcaneum was short and compressed across its back tuberosity which leads to a sharp and thick slant with a rounded head. He also attributed an astragalus to the genus and described it as being narrow plus slender in shape similar to those of the anthracothere Elomeryx and the wild boar (Sus scrofa). However, in 1947, Jean Viret and J. Prudant stated that the astragalus actually belonged not to Dacrytherium but Choeropotamus while that previously attributed to the latter was reclassified as belonging to the former.

The astragalus previously attributed to Choeropotamus was described by Depéret as having a twisted appearance vertically, which he said distinguishes it from the rectilinear-shaped astragali of ruminants. The bone is short and stocky in proportions, making its appearance very similar to that of Anthracotherium, the main differences setting it from the astragalus of Anthracotherium being the compressed area of the back joint and the slanting of the ridge dividing the two articular surfaces for the scaphoid and thigh. Viret and Prudant considered that the astragalus reclassified to Dacrytherium is broad and has unequal lips of the tibial trochlea, a broad sustentacular facet joint, a digital pulley limited to the front area, and a deep cavity on the bone's external face. These traits, they determined, were typical of the Anoplotheriidae, leading them to favor Dacrytherium belonging to the family. Despite the size of the astragalus being large (specifically larger than those of Choeropotamus), they felt that it belonged to Dacrytherium.

The morphology of the astragalus of Dacrytherium being similar to the astragali of the anoplotheriines Anoplotherium and Diplobune, as originally proposed by Viret and Prudant, was supported by Jean-Noël Martinez and Jean Sudre in 1995. They reported that the astragalus was proportionally wide and stocky and that the sustentacular facet is extensive compared to the dichobunid Messelobunodon and the suoid Doliochoerus. In contrast to the concave facet of Anoplotherium and Diplobune, that of Dacrytherium is flat to slightly convex. Because of their unique morphologies, Anoplotherium, Diplobune, and Dacrytherium had many characteristics with no modern analogues.

Viret and Prudant also observed an incomplete radius that is well-preserved on the proximal end, which they said had three parts: the middle area that is hollowed out for articulation with the capitulum of the humerus and two other outer areas that form planes inclined in opposite directions. Its condylar facet is more developed compared to the trochlear facet and slopes both outwards and forward. These traits are consistent with the anatomical structures of typical anoplotheriids, corresponding to a level of mobility of the forelimb unusual for artiodactyls. They determined that one of the two radii belonged to D. ovinum and not Leptotheridium because the latter genus is smaller than the former species. The second proximal end of a radius, which they attributed to Catodontherium, differs from that of Dacrytherium by a transversely enlarged appearance, a wider end area, and a more primitive form in how less differentiated it is compared to Dacrytherium.

=== Size ===
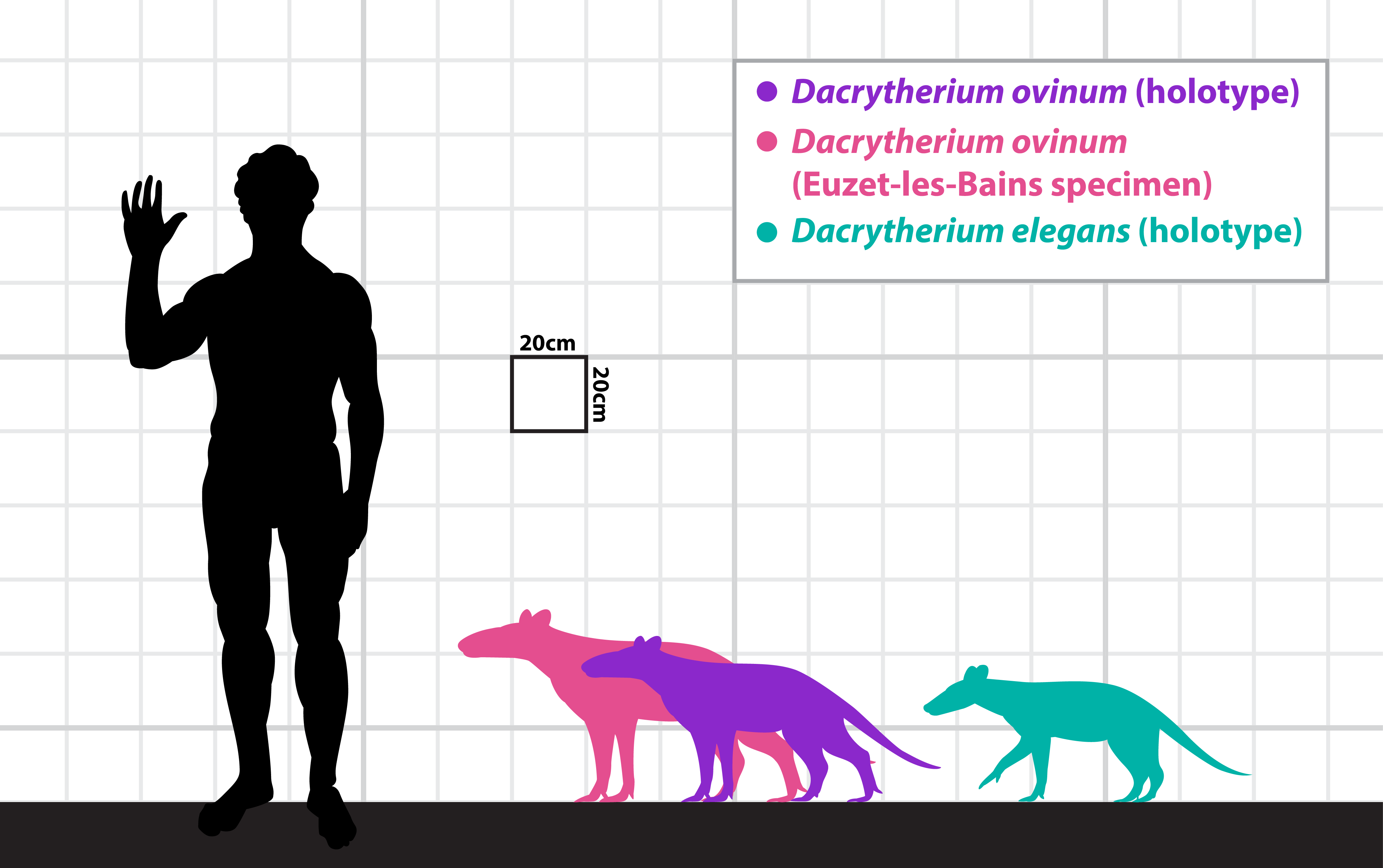
Estimated size comparisons of D. ovinum and D. elegans based on known fossil remains

Since 1917, palaeontologists like Depéret in 1917 noticed size differences in species of Dacrytherium based on tooth sizes. Depéret explained that D. saturnini was small-sized similar to D. elegans and differed from D. ovinum only based on the smaller dimensions of its molars. D. saturnini and D. ovinum were parallel to each other in ranges and likely represented different branches of the genus, both then going extinct without leaving any descendants. Depéret's argument was extended further by Sudre in 1978, who stated that D. saturnini and D. ovinum were the largest species as well as the latest of their lineages, therefore composing of the D. elegans-D. saturnini and D. priscum-D. ovinum lineages. In 1988, however, Sudre changed his mind and determined that because D. elegans reached maximum molarization, it could not have been the ancestor of D. saturnini, potentially leaving the descendant of the latter unknown.

Martinez and Sudre followed up with weight estimates for D. saturnini amongst other Palaeogene artiodactyls in 1995 based on the dimensions of their astragali and M_{1} teeth. The astragali are common bones in fossil assemblages due to their reduced vulnerability to fragmentation as a result of their stocky shape and compact structure, explaining their choice for using it. The two weight estimates of D. saturnini from the locality of Sainte Néboule (MP18) yielded different results, the M_{1} giving the body mass of 7.51 kg (16.6 lb) and the astragalus yielding 13.187 kg (29.07 lb). The researchers considered that the body weight of D. saturnini from the M_{1} is an underestimate compared to the result from the astragalus.

In 2014, Takehisa Tsubamoto reexamined the relationship between astragalus size and estimated body mass based on extensive studies of extant terrestrial mammals, reapplying the methods to Palaeogene artiodactyls previously tested by Sudre and Martinez. The researcher used linear measurements and their products with adjusted correction factors. The recalculations resulted in somewhat lower estimates compared to the 1995 results (with the exception of Diplobune minor, which as a shorter astragalus proportion than most other artiodactyls), displayed in the below graph:

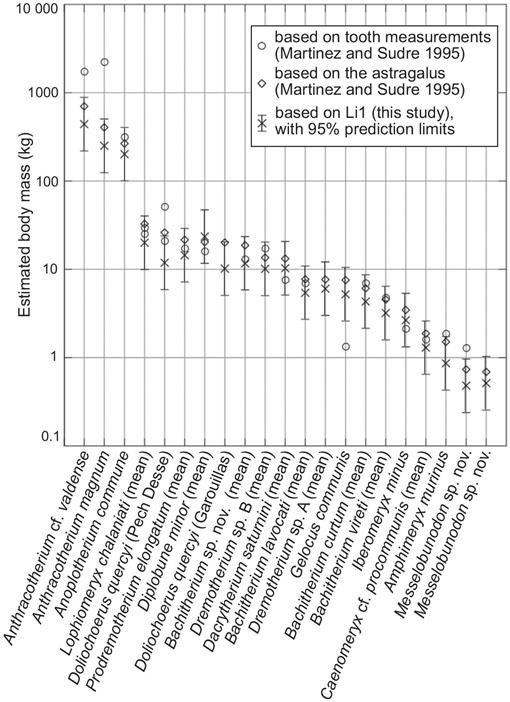
Estimated body masses (kg) of Palaeogene artiodactyls based on recalculated trochlear widths (Li1) in comparison to estimates from Martinez and Sudre (1995)

== Palaeobiology ==
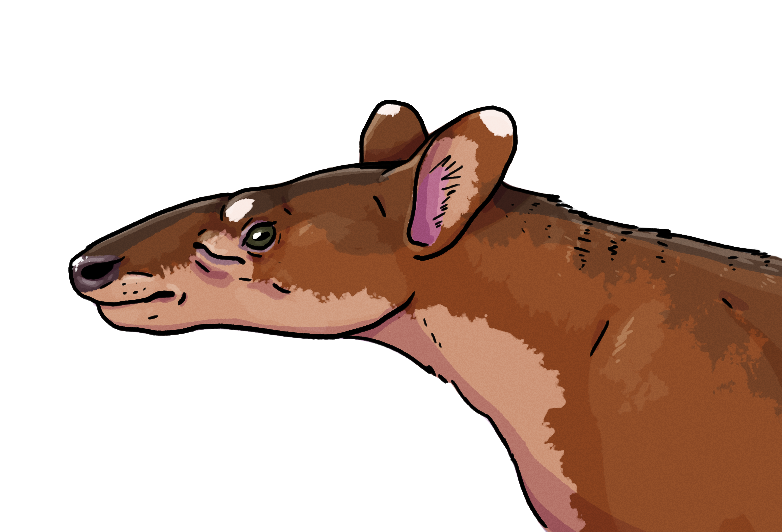
Reconstruction of the head of D. ovinum

The palaeobiologies of anoplotheriids including the dacrytheriine Dacrytherium are uncertain. While palaeontologists had historically established anoplotheriids as having unusual postcranial morphologies with no modern analogues amongst artiodactyls, their behaviours are still unknown as postcranial evidence for most anoplotheriids, including Dacrytherium, remain scarce. Modern-day hypotheses range from arborealism in the case of Diplobune to bipedalism in the case of Anoplotherium, with Jerry J. Hooker also speculating the possibility of other anoplotheriids sharing similar behaviours. Alternatively, Hooker in 1986 suggested that Dacrytherium may have been a purely ground-dwelling folivore.

Hooker in 1986 also pointed out that Dacrytherium and Mixtotherium, despite belonging to different artiodactyl families, had similar dentitions based on their low-crowned and strongly selenodont molars. The Dacrytheriinae and Anoplotheriinae are thought to have belonged to the selenodont dentition group of endemic European Palaeogene artiodactyls, meaning that they were likely folivorous browsers.

== Palaeoecology ==
=== Middle Eocene ===
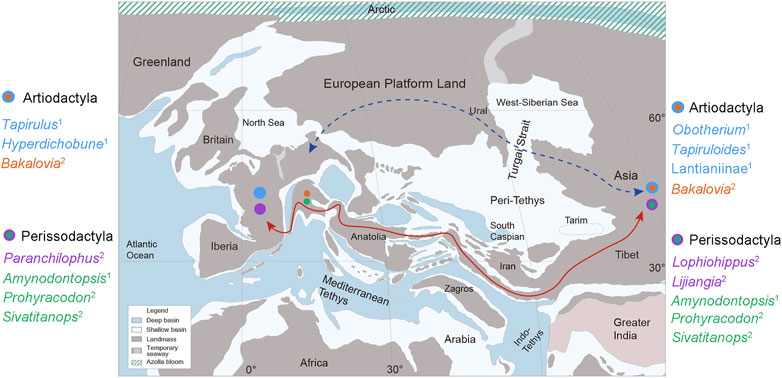
Palaeogeography of Europe and Asia during the middle Eocene with possible artiodactyl and perissodactyl dispersal routes.

For much of the Eocene, a hothouse climate with humid, tropical environments with consistently high precipitations prevailed. Modern mammalian orders including the Perissodactyla, Artiodactyla, and Primates (or the suborder Euprimates) appeared already by the early Eocene, diversifying rapidly and developing dentitions specialized for folivory. The omnivorous forms mostly either switched to folivorous diets or went extinct by the middle Eocene (47–37 million years ago) along with the archaic "condylarths". By the late Eocene (approx. 37–33 mya), most of the ungulate form dentitions shifted from bunodont (or rounded) cusps to cutting ridges (i.e. lophs) for folivorous diets.

Land connections between western Europe and North America were interrupted around 53 Ma. From the early Eocene up until the Grande Coupure extinction event (56–33.9 mya), western Eurasia was separated into three landmasses: western Europe (an archipelago), Balkanatolia (in-between the Paratethys Sea of the north and the Neotethys Ocean of the south), and eastern Eurasia. The Holarctic mammalian faunas of western Europe were therefore mostly isolated from other landmasses including Greenland, Africa, and eastern Eurasia, allowing for endemism to develop. Therefore, the European mammals of the late Eocene (MP17–MP20 of the Mammal Palaeogene zones) were mostly descendants of endemic middle Eocene groups.

The first undisputed appearance of Dacrytherium was by MP13 (44.9 to 43.5 Ma) in the form of the species D. cf. elegans. D. priscum, meanwhile, is known exclusively from the Swiss deposit of Egerkingen, which dates back to MP14. By MP13, the dacrytheriine coexisted with perissodactyls (Palaeotheriidae, Lophiodontidae, and Hyrachyidae), non-endemic artiodactyls (Dichobunidae and Tapirulidae), endemic European artiodactyls (Choeropotamidae, Cebochoeridae, Mixtotheriidae, and other members of Anoplotheriidae), and primates (Adapidae). Both the Amphimerycidae and Xiphodontidae made their appearances by the level MP14. The stratigraphic ranges of the early species of Dacrytherium also overlapped with metatherians (Herpetotheriidae), cimolestans (Pantolestidae, Paroxyclaenidae), rodents (Ischyromyidae, Theridomyoidea, Gliridae), eulipotyphlans, bats, apatotherians, carnivoraformes (Miacidae), and hyaenodonts (Hyainailourinae, Proviverrinae). Other MP13-MP14 sites have also yielded fossils of turtles and crocodylomorphs, and MP13 sites are stratigraphically the latest to have yielded remains of the Gastornithidae and Palaeognathae.

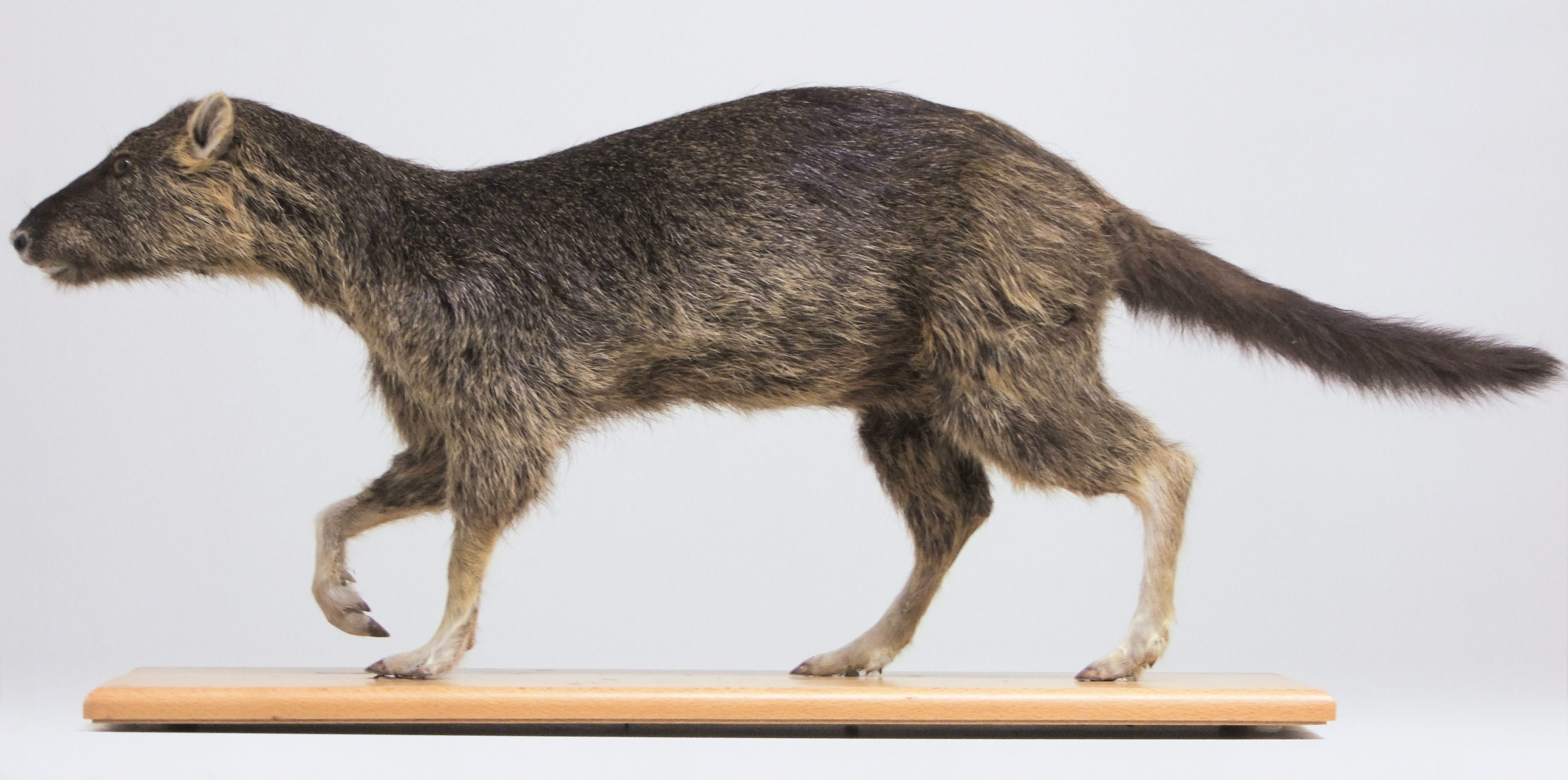
Reconstruction of Amphirhagatherium weigelti of MP12-MP13. The genus persisted until MP20.

In the level MP13, D. cf. elegans fossils cooccurred with those of many other mammals such as the herpetotheriid Amphiperatherium, miacid Quercygale, proviverrine Proviverra, equoid Hallensia, palaeotheres Propalaeotherium and Plagiolophus, lophiodont Lophiodon, choeropotamids (Haplobunodon, Rhagatherium and Amphirhagatherium), and the cebochoerid Cebochoerus.

Undisputed fossil remains of D. elegans occur in several sites of France and Switzerland that date back to MP16, such as Mormont Eclépens, Le Bretou, and Robiac. Although sources typically point to the exclusivity of D. elegans in MP16 localities, a 2025 source suggests that it was present in the Swiss locality of Egerkingen, dating to MP14. The locality of Robiac indicates that D. elegans coexisted with similar mammal faunas as earlier species of the genus, such as the herpetotheriids Peratherium and Amphiperatherium, hyaenodonts Paroxyaena and Cynohyaenodon, miacids Paramiacis and Quercygale, palaeotheres (Palaeotherium, Plagiolophus, Anchilophus), lophiodont Lophiodon, cebochoerids Cebochoerus and Acotherulum, choeropotamid Choeropotamus, dichobunid Mouillacitherium, robiacinid Robiacina, xiphodonts (Xiphodon, Dichodon, and Haplomeryx), amphimerycid Amphimeryx, and other anoplotheriids Catodontherium and Robiatherium. Fossil localities such as the Creechbarrow Limestone formation in England, an MP16 locality where some D. elegans fossils were uncovered, suggest a subtropical climate that could support closed forested environments for arboreal animals and animals with folivorous and/or frugivorous diets.

By MP16, a faunal turnover occurred, marking the disappearances of the lophiodonts and European hyrachyids as well as the extinctions of all European crocodylomorphs except for the alligatoroid Diplocynodon. The causes of the faunal turnover have been attributed to a shift from humid and highly tropical environments to drier and more temperate forests with open areas and more abrasive vegetation. The surviving herbivorous faunas shifted their dentitions and dietary strategies accordingly to adapt to abrasive and seasonal vegetation. The environments were still subhumid and full of subtropical evergreen forests, however. The Palaeotheriidae was the sole remaining European perissodactyl group, and frugivorous-folivorous or purely folivorous artiodactyls became the dominant group in western Europe.

=== Late Eocene ===
In the late Eocene, there were two species of Dacrytherium: D. ovinum and D. saturnini. D. ovinum ranges stratigraphically from MP17a to MP18 while D. saturnini ranges from MP17b to MP19 (the latter faunal unit ranging from 37.5 to 34 Ma). Both lineages largely coexisted with the same artiodactyl families as well as the Palaeotheriidae within western Europe, although the Cainotheriidae and the derived anoplotheriids Anoplotherium and Diplobune all made their first fossil record appearances by MP18. In addition, several migrant mammal groups had reached western Europe by MP17a-MP18, namely the Anthracotheriidae, Hyaenodontinae, and Amphicyonidae. In addition to snakes, frogs, and salamandrids, rich assemblage of lizards are known in western Europe as well from MP16-MP20, representing the Iguanidae, Lacertidae, Gekkonidae, Agamidae, Scincidae, Helodermatidae, and Varanoidea, most of which were able to thrive in the warm temperatures of western Europe.

The MP18 locality of La Débruge of France indicates that D. saturnini coexisted with a wide variety of mammals, namely the herpetotheriid Peratherium, rodents (Blainvillimys, Theridomys, Plesiarctomys, Glamys), hyaenodonts (Hyaenodon and Pterodon), amphicyonid Cynodictis, palaeotheres (Plagiolophus, Anchilophus, Palaeotherium), dichobunid Dichobune, choeropotamid Choeropotamus, cebochoerids Cebochoerus and Acotherulum, anoplotheriids Anoplotherium and Diplobune, tapirulid Tapirulus, xiphodonts Xiphodon and Dichodon, cainothere Oxacron, amphimerycid Amphimeryx, and anthracothere Elomeryx.

== See also ==
- Anoplotherium
- Diplobune
