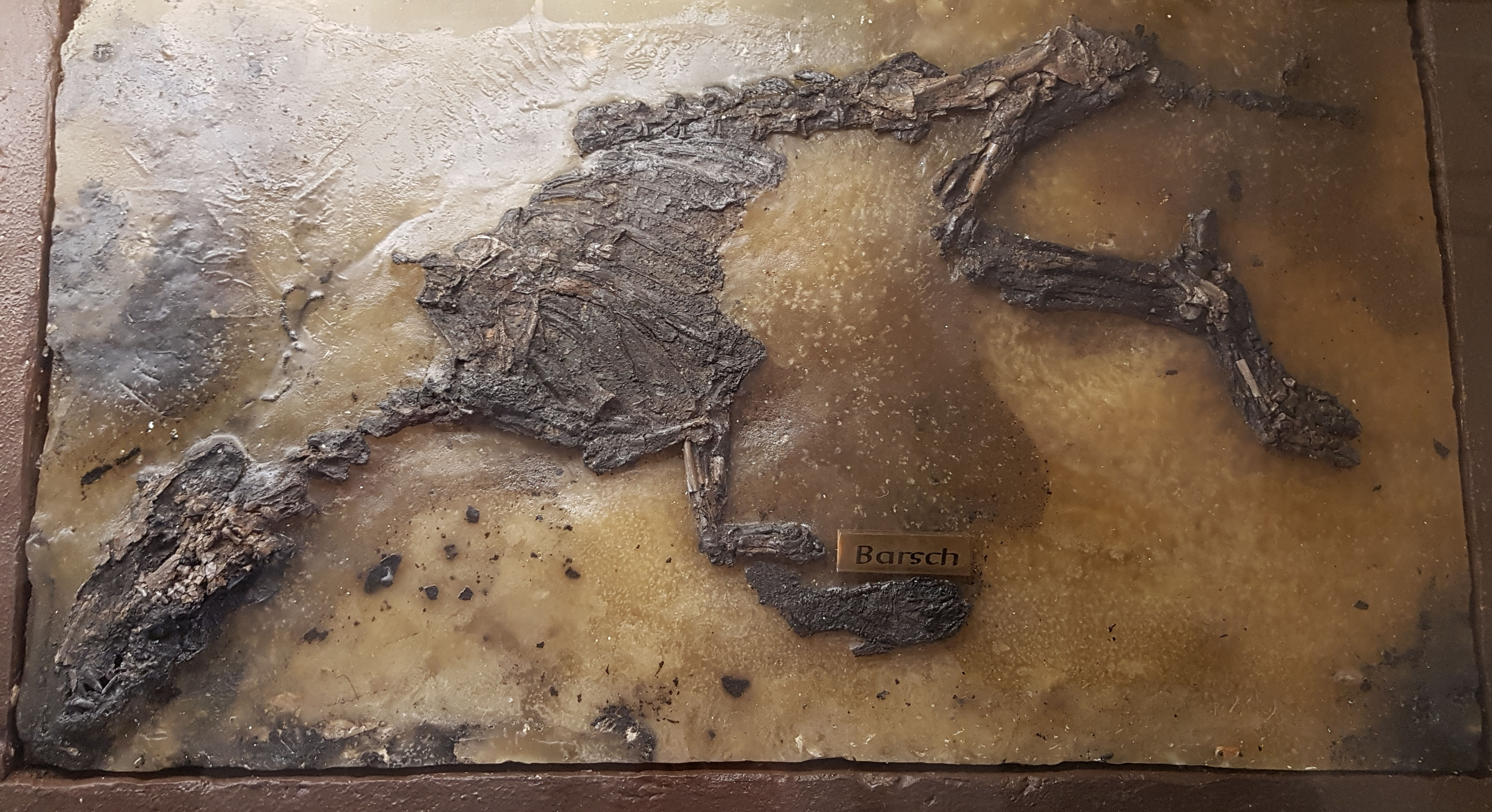
- Fossil in Geiseltalmuseum

Scientific classification
- Kingdom: Animalia
- Phylum: Chordata
- Class: Mammalia
- Order: Artiodactyla
- Family: †Choeropotamidae
- Genus: †Amphirhagatherium; Depéret, 1908

Type species
- †Amphirhagatherium fronstettense Depéret, 1908

Species
- A. edwardsi; A. fronstettense; A. louisi; A. ruetimeyeri; A. weigelti

Synonyms
- Anthracobunodon

= Amphirhagatherium =

Amphirhagatherium Temporal range: Late Eocene-Early Oligocene ~37–29 Ma

Extinct genus of mammals

Amphirhagatherium is an extinct genus of artiodactyl that lived in Northern Europe during the late Eocene to Early Oligocene.

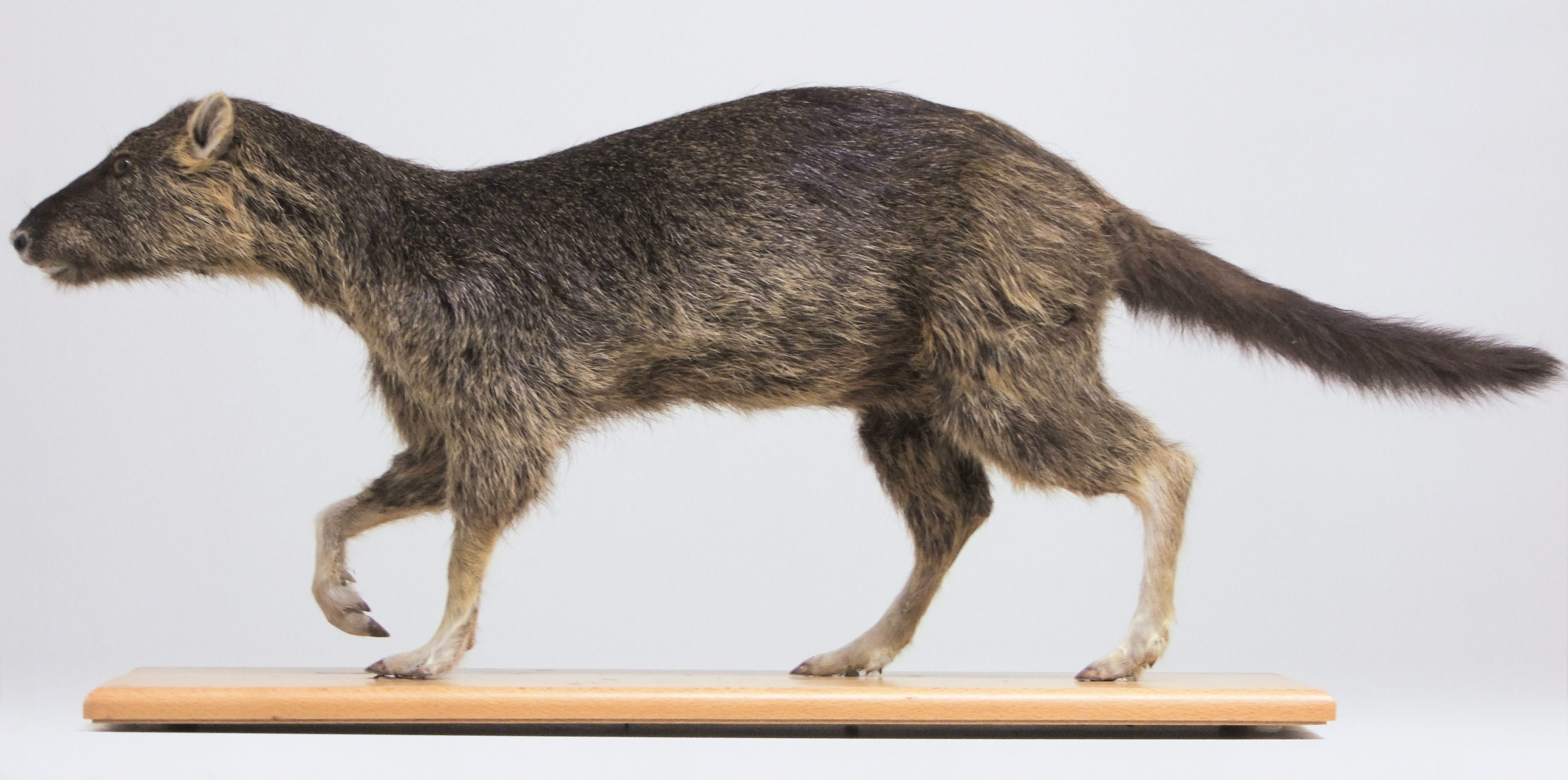
Model of A. weigelti

The dentition of Amphirhagatherium suggests that the genus had a mixed diet of leaves and fruits likely eaten at ground level. Caniniform anterior teeth suggest that there may have been a small carnivorous dietary component, or that they were used for intraspecific combat.

== Distribution ==
Eocene

- Creechbarrow Limestone, Upper Headon Beds and Bembridge Marls Formations, England
- Frohnstetten, Germany
- Geiseltal, Germany
- Rocourt-Saint-Martin and Chéry-Chartreuve, France

Oligocene

- Bembridge Marls, England
