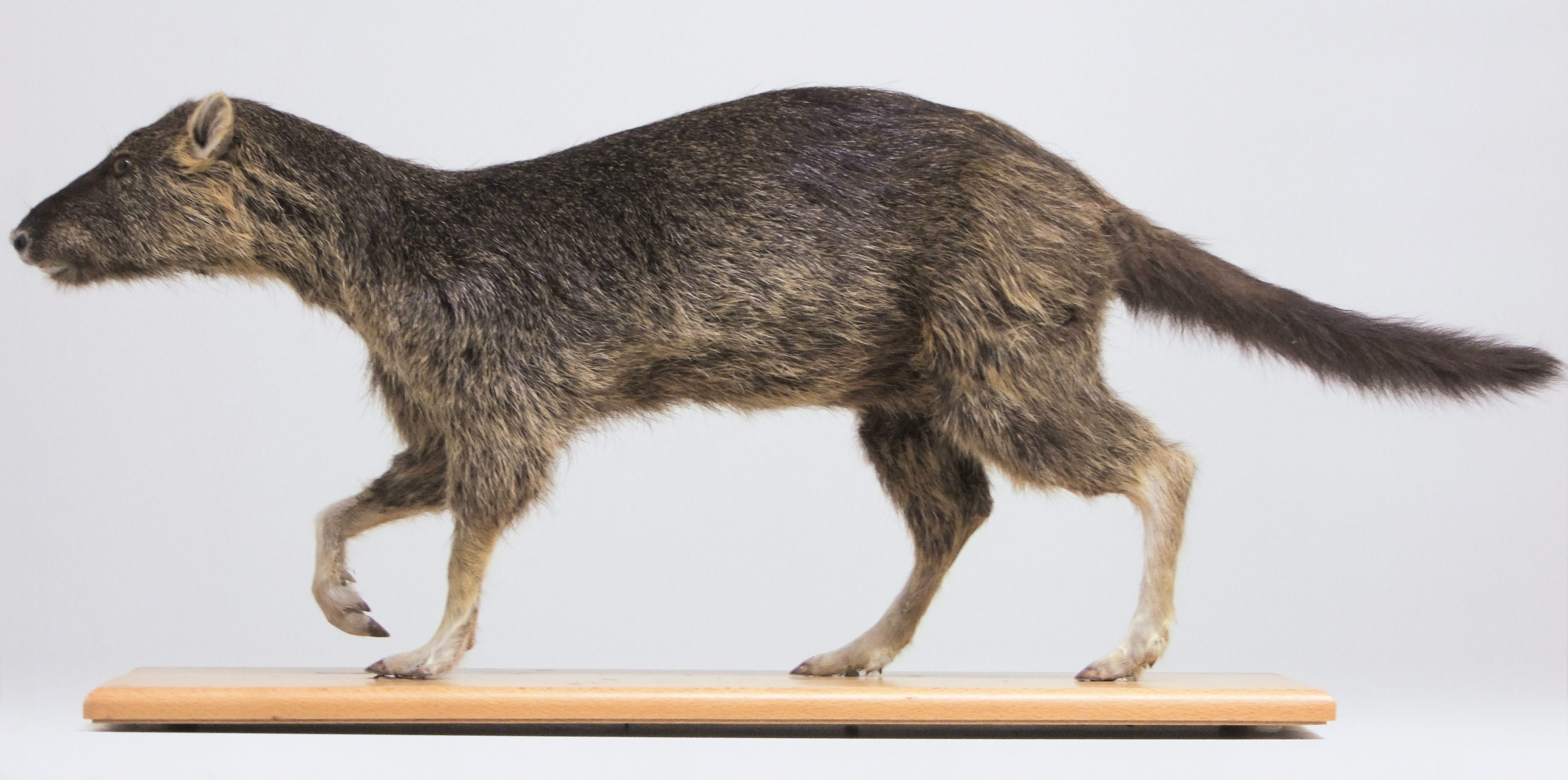
- Model of Amphirhagatherium weigelti

Scientific classification
- Kingdom: Animalia
- Phylum: Chordata
- Class: Mammalia
- Order: Artiodactyla
- Infraorder: Ancodonta
- Family: †Choeropotamidae; Owen, 1845

= Choeropotamidae =

Choeropotamidae Temporal range: Middle Eocene–Late Oligocene

Extinct herbivore mammals

Choeropotamidae, also known as Haplobunodontidae, are a family of extinct mammal herbivores, belonging to the artiodactyls. They lived between the lower/middle Eocene and lower Oligocene (about 48 - 30 million years ago) and their remains were found in Europe and Africa.

== Description ==
Choeropotamidae had the classic archaic appearance of primitive artiodactyls, with an unspecialized body and relatively small size. However, since the middle Eocene, choeropotamids began to develop some characteristics that will be found, more accentuated, in the suiforms: bunodonti molars (low and wide crown) and short legs. Partially complete fossils with shapes such as Amphirhagatherium indicate that these animals still had a relatively elongated tail, slender legs shorter than those of other archaic artiodactyls, an elongated and flexible body, and a long snout. The length of these animals would not exceed 1 meter, and the weight was around 5 to 10 kilograms.

== Classification ==
Choeropotamidae are mainly known in numerous European Eocene deposits, and only a few fossils of dubious identity have been found in Egypt and Turkey. Choeropotamids are clearly derived from primitive forms of artiodactyls such as Diacodexis, and yet they already show some specializations that recall the suiforms, although they are not their direct ancestors. Among the various genera belonging to this family are Haplobunodon, Masillabune, Choeropotamus, Tapirulus, Amphirhagatherium and Rhagatherium.
