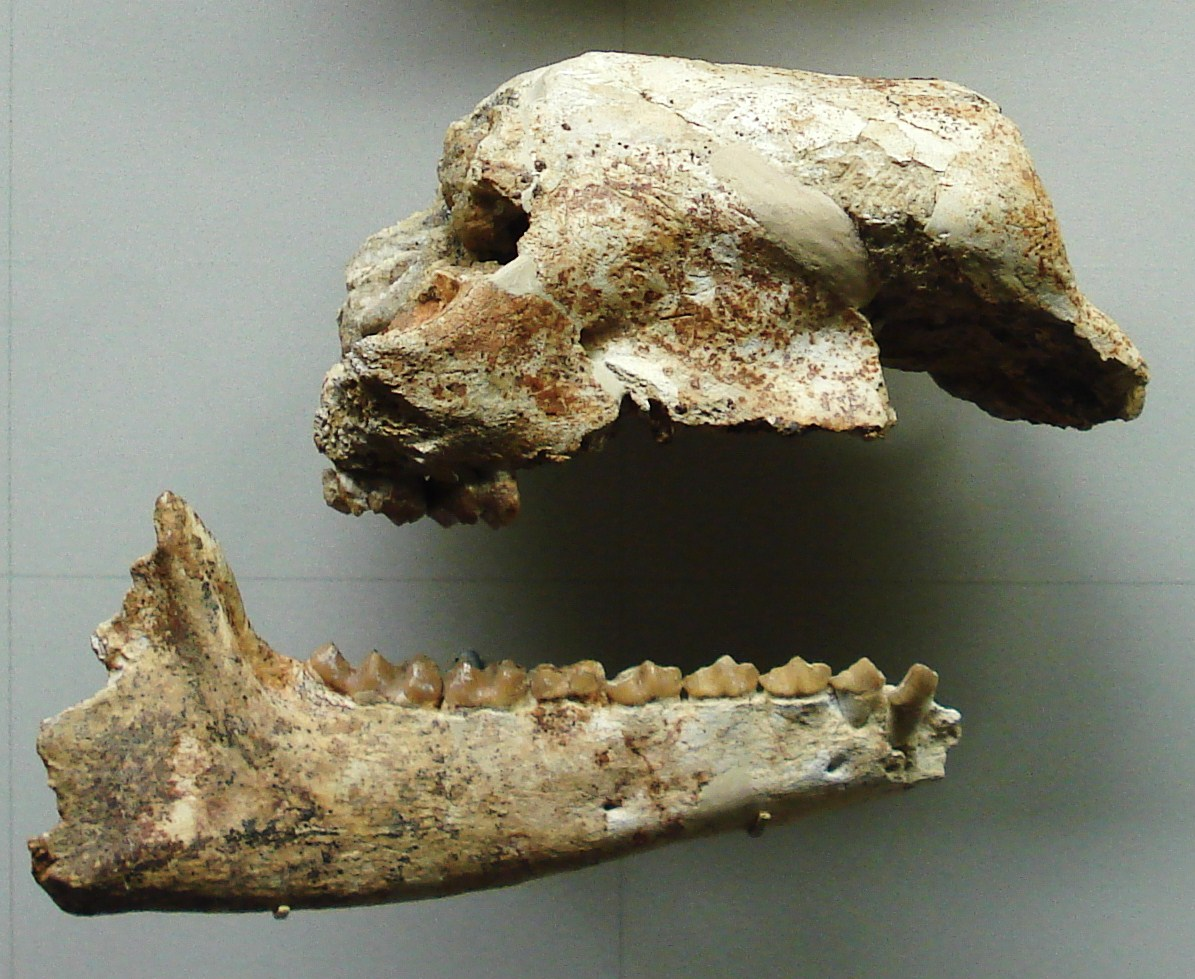
- Diplobune sp. cranial remains, State Museum of Natural History Stuttgart

Scientific classification
- Kingdom: Animalia
- Phylum: Chordata
- Class: Mammalia
- Order: Artiodactyla
- Family: †Anoplotheriidae
- Subfamily: †Anoplotheriinae
- Genus: †Diplobune; Rütimeyer, 1862

Type species
- †Diplobune minor Filhol, 1877

Other species
- †D. secundaria Cuvier, 1822; †D. bavarica Fraas, 1870; †D. quercyi Filhol, 1877

Synonyms
- Genus synonymy: Thylacomorphus Gervais, 1876; Hyracodon Filhol, 1876 (preoccupied); Hyracodontherium Filhol, 1877; Synonyms of D. secundaria: Anoplotherium secundaria Cuvier, 1822; Eurytherium modicum Filhol, 1877; Synonyms of D. bavarica: Anoplotherium cayluxense Lydekker, 1885

= Diplobune =

Diplobune Temporal range: Late Eocene - Early Oligocene 37–30 Ma

Extinct genus of endemic Palaeogene European artiodactyls

Diplobune (Ancient Greek: διπλοῦς (double) + βουνός (hill) meaning "double hill") is an extinct genus of Palaeogene artiodactyls belonging to the family Anoplotheriidae. It was endemic to Europe and lived from the late Eocene to the early Oligocene. The genus was first erected as a subgenus of Dichobune by Ludwig Rütimeyer in 1862 based on his hypothesis of the taxon being a transitional form between "Anoplotherium" secundaria, previously erected by Georges Cuvier in 1822, and Dichobune. He based the genus etymology off of the two-pointed pillarlike shapes of the lower molars, which had since been a diagnosis of it. However, in 1870, Diplobune was elevated to genus rank by Oscar Fraas, who recognized that Diplobune was a distinct genus related to Anoplotherium and not Dichobune. After several revisions of the anoplotheriids, there are currently four known species of which D. minor is the type species.

Diplobune was an evolutionarily derived medium to large-sized anoplotheriid with shared similarities to the sister taxon Anoplotherium; the differences mainly consisting of all species having specialized three-fingered limbs and various specific dental, postcranial, and brain anatomy differences. It was well-adapted for purely folivorous diets, with dentition capable of chewing through hard leaf material and an implied presence of tapered tongues for reaching branches similar to modern-day giraffids. Its limbs were very specialized of which there are no modern analogues, especially in artiodactyls, with implied powerful muscles for some extent of mobility in the form of bending its fingers, especially its left, shortest finger (finger II).

Such unique traits along with hints of slow-walking locomotion suggest a life of arborealism or semi-arborealism, where it was likely able to grasp onto hard objects for climbing them. These traits would have set it apart in lifestyle from Anoplotherium, the Palaeotheriidae, and most other mammals that it coexisted with. Although the sizes of several species are not described, D. secundaria of the late Eocene was estimated to weigh approximately 130 kg (290 lb) and measure about 2 m (6 ft 7 in) in length and 1.2 m (3 ft 11 in) in shoulder height, whereas D. minor of the early Oligocene was much smaller with estimated weights of 20 kg (44 lb).

The evolutionary history of Diplobune is not complete, but it lived in western Europe back when it was an archipelago that was isolated from the rest of Eurasia, meaning that it lived in an environment with various other faunas that also evolved with strong levels of endemism. It, like Anoplotherium, arose long after a shift towards drier but still subhumid conditions that led to abrasive plants and the extinctions of the large-sized Lophiodontidae, becoming a regular component of late Eocene faunal communities. It survived through the Grande Coupure extinction event of western Europe in the earliest Oligocene but seemingly lost at least one species in the process. D. minor appeared in the early Oligocene as likely the last representative of the Anoplotheriidae, leaning towards specialization in forested, subhumid environments with freshwater bodies.

== Taxonomy ==
=== Early history ===
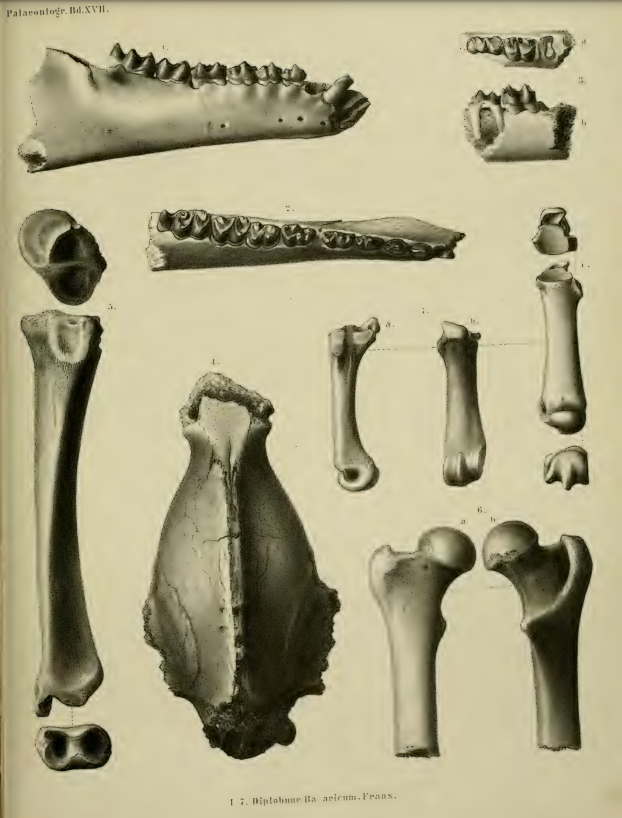
1877 illustrations of Diplobune bavarica fossil remains

In 1862, Swiss palaeontologist Ludwig Rütimeyer discussed his hypothesis that Anoplotherium secundarium was a transitional species to the genus Dichobune. He noticed that the inner mounds of the molars of the studied species were distinctly bicuspid, the tips not being in equal size. Because of the molar morphologies being similar to those of both Dichobune and Anoplotherium, he created the Dichobune subgenus Diplobune, thinking that it was the subgenus that derived species of Dichobune descended from. Rütimeyer did not elaborate on which species belonged to the subgenus, however. While the etymology of Diplobune was not defined by Rütimeyer, it derives in Greek from "diplós" (double) and "bounós" (hill, usually referencing rounded cusps), meaning that the etymology of the genus name is "double hill."

However, the status of Diplobune as a subgenus of Dichobune did not last long. In 1870, German palaeontologist Oscar Fraas wrote about a mammal with numerous remains from the locality of Munich, its molars being similar but not identical to A. commune in terms of typical species diagnoses. He noticed the bicuspid characteristic and assigned the fossil materials to Diplobune. He also wrote that based on its dentition, Dichobune had no evolutionary relationship with the anoplotheriids, making Diplobune a distinct genus. Although Fraas was the sole author of his article, he credited his colleague Karl Alfred von Zittel for the name D. bavaricum, which the specimens belonged to.

Several species now attributed to Diplobune were historically not included in the genus initially due to either being erected far before the genus itself (Anoplotherium secundarium by Georges Cuvier in 1822) or after. In 1877, Henri Filhol reassigned A. secundarium to the genus Eurytherium on the genus diagnosis that it has three toes. He also made three species for the genus mostly based on dentition: E. modicum, E. quercyi, and E. minus. Filhol also argued that Eurytherium took priority over Diplobune because he thought that the three-toed diagnosis takes priority over dental diagnoses.

Several genus names that would eventually become synonyms of Diplobune were created in the late 19th century. In 1876, Paul Gervais named a newer genus Thylacomorphus based on skull that he thought to belong to an animal closely related to thylacines, the type species being T. cristatus. Thylacomorphus materials were later referred to the hyaenodont Cynohyaenodon by Max Schlosser. However, in 1901, William Diller Matthew determined that the back of the skull actually belonged to Diplobune quercyi.

In the same year, Filhol created a genus "Hyracodon" ("hyrax tooth") after he noticed that the species' teeth, originating from the locality of Caylux in Quercy, were similar to those of hyraxes, creating the type species H. primavus. Filhol was apparently unaware that the genus name "Hyracodon" was already reserved by American palaeontologist Joseph Leidy in 1856 for a rhinocerotoid initially, later changing the genus name to Hyracodontherium in 1877. Filhol named another species H. crassum in 1882, and a third species H. filholi was named by Richard Lydekker in 1889. The genus name was eventually synonymized with Diplobune by a palaeontological textbook in 1925 and Johannes Hürzeler in 1938, the latter noticing the similarities of the type species to the older genus. Hürzeler reclassified H. filholi to the new anoplotheriid genus Ephelcomenus in 1938 and discussed about being unsure of the status of "H. crassum" since it was based on a fragment of a mandible that was only briefly described and not illustrated. "H. crassum" and "H. primaevum" were not directly invalidated in 1938 but have not been recognized as valid species since.

=== Anoplotheriidae revisions ===
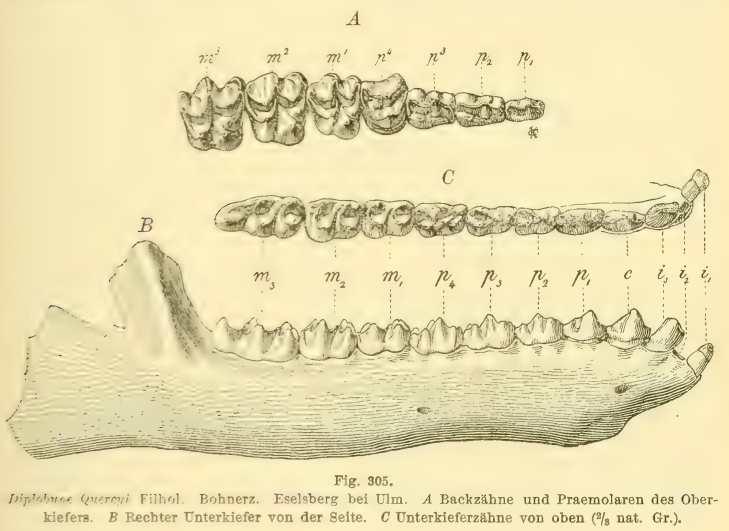
Illustrations of Diplobune quercyi cranial and dental remains, 1891–1893

In 1883, Max Schlosser made Eurytherium a synonym of Anoplotherium because he argued that the limb anatomies and dentitions were specific differences in characteristics rather than major ones that defined an entire genus. Sclosser pointed out that all species of Anoplotherium in some form had three indexes despite A. commune having less developed third indexes than A. latipes. As a result, Diplobune became the senior synonym for the species D. bavaricum, D. modicum, D. quercyi, and D. minus. He also mentioned that D. modicum was similar to D. bavaricum with the differences lying in specific dental characteristics. Schlosser noticed that A. secundarium appeared to have been related to Diplobune that he considered it "almost advisable" to reclassify it to the genus.

In 1885, Lydekker synonymized Diplobune with Anoplotherium because he felt that differences in the lower dentition were not worthy of generic distinctions, transferring species of the former genus to the latter genus. He also named a new species A. cayluxense. The demotion of Diplobune as a synonym of Anoplotherium was not followed by subsequent authors, however, as they recognized it as a valid genus. Also, von Zittel synonymized Plesidacrytherium and Mixtotherium with Diplobune in 1891–1893, but Hans Georg Stehlin in 1910 instead synonymized Plesidacrytherium with Dacrytherium while revalidating Mixtotherium.

The same year that he touched upon the two other genus names, Stehlin also argued that Diplobune was morphologically similar to Anoplotherium but were generically distinct from each other. The German palaeontologist reclassified Anoplotherium secundaria to Diplobune plus synonymized D. modicum/D. modica with D. bavarica and A. cayluxense with D. secundaria. The synonymy of "A. secundaria" with D. secundaria was agreed upon by Marcellin Boule and Jean Piveteau in 1935.

=== Classification ===
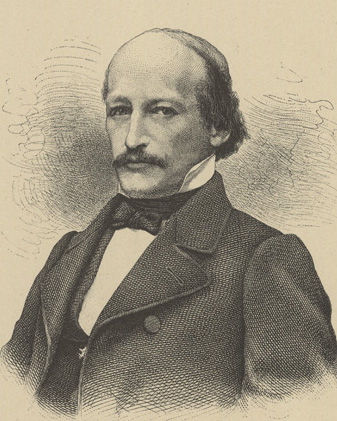
Portrait of Ludwig Rütimeyer, who originally erected the name Diplobune as a subgenus, which then was determined to be a distinct genus

Diplobune belongs to the Anoplotheriidae, a Palaeogene artiodactyl family endemic to western Europe that lived from the middle Eocene to the early Oligocene (~44 to 30 Ma, possible earliest record at ~48 Ma). The type species of the genus is D. minor, first described long after the genus name was first created. The exact evolutionary origins and dispersals of the anoplotheriids are uncertain, but they exclusively resided within the continent when it was an archipelago that was isolated by seaway barriers from other regions such as Balkanatolia and the rest of eastern Eurasia. The Anoplotheriidae's relations with other members of the Artiodactyla are not well-resolved, with some determining it to be either a tylopod (which includes camelids and merycoidodonts of the Palaeogene) or a close relative to the infraorder and some others believing that it may have been closer to the Ruminantia (which includes tragulids and other close Palaeogene relatives).

The Anoplotheriidae consists of two subfamilies, the Dacrytheriinae and Anoplotheriinae, the latter of which is the younger subfamily that Diplobune belongs to. The Dacrytheriinae is the older subfamily of the two that first appeared in the middle Eocene (since the Mammal Palaeogene zones unit MP13, possibly up to MP10), although some authors consider them to be a separate family in the form of the Dacrytheriidae. Anoplotheriines made their first appearances by the late Eocene (MP15-MP16), or ~41-40 Ma, within western Europe with Duerotherium and Robiatherium. By MP17a-MP17b, however, there is a notable gap in the fossil record of anoplotheriines overall as the former two genera seemingly made their last appearances by the previous MP level MP16.

By MP18, Anoplotherium and Diplobune made their first appearances in western Europe, but their exact origins are unknown. The two genera were widespread throughout western Europe based on abundant fossil evidence spanning from Portugal, Spain, United Kingdom, France, Germany, and Switzerland for much of pre-Grande Coupure Europe (prior to MP21), meaning that they were typical elements of the late Eocene up until the earliest Oligocene. The earlier anoplotheriines are considered to be smaller species whereas the later anoplotheriines were larger. Not all species of Diplobune were medium to large-sized however, as at least D. minor is known for having small weight estimates. Anoplotherium and Diplobune are considered the most derived (or evolutionarily recent) anoplotheriids based on dental morphology and achieved gigantism amongst non-whippomorph artiodactyls, making them some of the largest non-whippomorph artiodactyls of the Palaeogene as well as amongst the largest mammals to roam western Europe at the time (all species of Anoplotherium were large to very large whereas not all species of Diplobune were large).

Conducting studies focused on the phylogenetic relations within the Anoplotheriidae has proven difficult due to the general scarcity of fossil specimens of most genera. The phylogenetic relations of the Anoplotheriidae as well as the Xiphodontidae, Mixtotheriidae, and Cainotheriidae have also been elusive due to the selenodont morphologies (or having crescent-shaped ridges) of the molars, which were convergent with tylopods or ruminants. Some researchers considered the selenodont families Anoplotheriidae (represented below by Anoplotherium and Dacrytherium), Xiphodontidae, and Cainotheriidae to be within Tylopoda due to postcranial features that were similar to the tylopods from North America in the Palaeogene. Other researchers tie them as being more closely related to ruminants than tylopods based on dental morphology. Different phylogenetic analyses have produced different results for the "derived" selenodont Eocene European artiodactyl families, making it uncertain whether they were closer to the Tylopoda or Ruminantia.

In an article published in 2019, Romain Weppe et al. conducted a phylogenetic analysis on the Cainotherioidea within the Artiodactyla based on mandibular and dental characteristics, specifically in terms of relationships with artiodactyls of the Palaeogene. The results retrieved that the superfamily was closely related to the Mixtotheriidae and Anoplotheriidae. They determined that the Cainotheriidae, Robiacinidae, Anoplotheriidae, and Mixtotheriidae formed a clade that was the sister group to the Ruminantia while Tylopoda, along with the Amphimerycidae and Xiphodontidae split earlier in the tree. The phylogenetic tree published in the article and another work about the cainotherioids is outlined below:

- - Eurodexis russelli
  - Dichobune leporina
  - - - Amphimeryx murinus
      - - Xiphodon castrense
        - Tylopoda
          - Paratoceras coatesi
          - Eotylopus reedi
    - - Ruminantia
        - Parvitragulus priscus
        - - Lophiomeryx chalaniati
          - Archaeomeryx optatus
      - - Mixtotheriidae
          Mixtotherium cuspidatum
        - Anoplotheriidae
          - Anoplotherium latipes
          - Dacrytherium ovinum
        - Cainotherioidea
          - Robiacinidae
            - Robiacina lavergnesis
            - - Robiacina minuta
              - Robiacina quercyi
          - Cainotheriidae
            - Palembertina deplasi
            - - Oxacroninae
                - Paroxacron bergeri
                - - Paroxacron valdense
                  - Oxacron courtoisii
              - Cainotheriinae
                - Cainotherium laticurvatum
                - - Caenomeryx
                    - Caenomeryx filholi
                    - Caenomeryx procommunis
                  - Plesiomeryx
                    - Plesiomeryx cadurcensis
                    - Plesiomeryx huerzeleri

In 2020, Vincent Luccisano et al. created a phylogenetic tree of the basal artiodactyls, a majority endemic to western Europe, from the Palaeogene. In one clade, the "bunoselenodont endemic European" Mixtotheriidae, Anoplotheriidae, Xiphodontidae, Amphimerycidae, Cainotheriidae, and Robiacinidae are grouped together with the Ruminantia. The phylogenetic tree as produced by the authors is shown below:

- Artiodactyla
  - Bunophorus
  - - Gunophorus
    - Diacodexis
  - - - Protodichobune
      - Eurodexis
    - - - Buxobune
        - - Mouillacitherium
          - Meniscodon
        - - - Hyperdichobune
            - - Dichobune robertiana
              - - Dichobune leporina
                - - Homacodon
                  - - Gobiohyus
                    - Suina
                      - - Khirtharia
                        - Entelodon
                      - - Palaeocheorus
                        - Perchoerus
          - - Haplobunodontidae
              - Haplobunodon
              - - Cuisitherium
                - Lophiobunodon
            - - Mixtotherium
              - - Robiacina
                - - - - Dacrytherium
                      - Diplobune
                    - - Xiphodon
                      - Paraxiphodon
                  - - - Cainotherium
                      - Paroxacron
                    - - Archaeomeryx
                      - - Amphimeryx
                        - Pseudamphimeryx
      - - Aumelasia
        - - - Hallebune
            - Amphirhagatherium
          - - Cebochoeridae
              - Cebochoerus
              - Gervachoerus
            - - Choeropotamus
              - Siamotherium

In 2022, Weppe created a phylogenetic analysis in his academic thesis regarding Palaeogene artiodactyl lineages, focusing most specifically on the endemic European families. The phylogenetic tree, according to Weppe, is the first to conduct phylogenetic affinities of all anoplotheriid genera, although not all individual species were included. He found that the Anoplotheriidae, Mixtotheriidae, and Cainotherioidea form a clade based on synapomorphic dental traits (traits thought to have originated from their most recent common ancestor). The result, Weppe mentioned, matches up with previous phylogenetic analyses on the Cainotherioidea with other endemic European Palaeogene artiodactyls that support the families as a clade. As a result, he argued that the proposed superfamily Anoplotherioidea, composing of the Anoplotheriidae and Xiphodontidae as proposed by Alan W. Gentry and Hooker in 1988, is invalid due to the polyphyly of the lineages in the phylogenetic analysis. However, the Xiphodontidae was still found to compose part of a wider clade with the three other groups. Anoplotherium and Diplobune compose a clade of the Anoplotheriidae because of their derived dental traits, supported by them being the latest-appearing anoplotheriids.

== Description ==
=== Skull ===
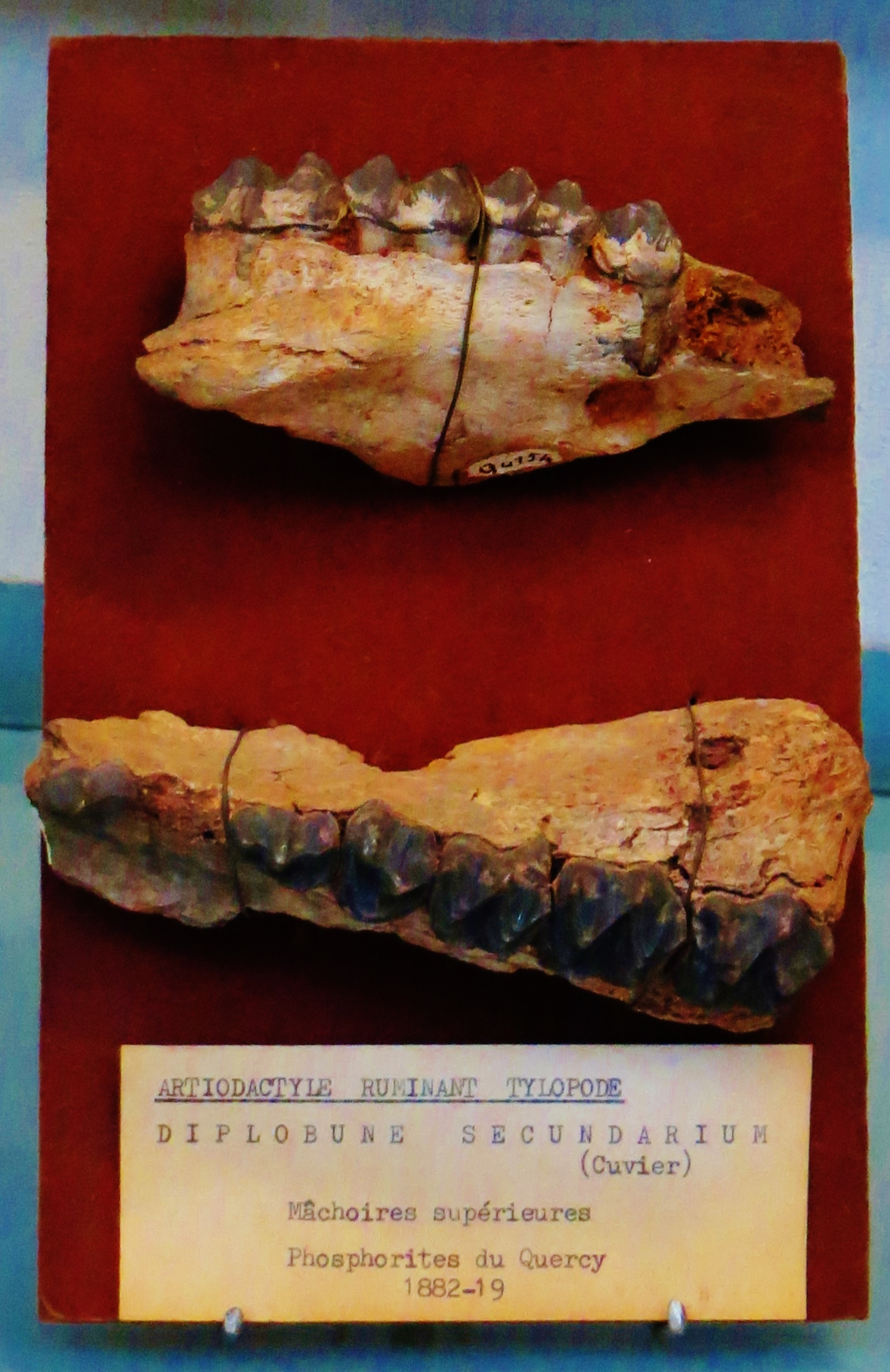
D. secundaria jaw remains, National Museum of Natural History, France

Skull materials of Diplobune are well known for multiple species, including one of D. minor uncovered between 1972 and 1975 in the Quercy locality of Itardies and one of D. secundaria that was uncovered in Saint-Capraise-d'Eymet (France) in 2000. Diplobune differs from other anoplotheriids by the mandible increasing in height on the back side, its high articulation (or connection) with the cranium, its transverse elongation without any obliqueness, and its coronoid process (projection) being wide to moderately wide plus curved backwards. Many cranial traits observed in Anoplotherium are also found in its close relative Diplobune, such as the glenoid (or hollow) surface being high in relation to the base of skull unlike Dacrytherium, a narrow occiput (back of the skull) that is enhanced just above the occipital condyles, and two small occipital buns for muscle attachment. The upper skull of Diplobune is almost flat as a line from the parietal bones of the skull's back to the front area of the nasals, and the orbits (eye sockets) are above M^{2} in position, similar to Anoplotherium.

In 1927, Helga Sharpe Pearson reviewed cranial features of Diplobune based on a D. bavarica skull from the Phosphorites of Escamps, France and a D. sp. skull from Ulm, Germany (the latter skull is larger). The hind area of the basilar part of occipital bone (basioccipital area) is convex. The position of the condylar canal and muscle arrangements of the basioccipital area of Diplobune are different from Anoplotherium and Dacrytherium. The postglenoid process is bulky and projects down compared to the two anoplotheriid genera. The two skulls are similar to those of Anoplotherium by the thickened neck of the eardrum that projects vertically downwards below the opening area of the ear canal. The stylomastoid foramen is small while the hyaloid fossa is large.

D. minor is known from multiple skull material such as a crushed one from Calaf, Spain with associated skeletal remains. The skull from Itardies measures about 20 cm (7.9 in) long and features traits typical of anoplotheriines, such as an elongated snout, backwards-extending premaxilla, low orbits, strong post-orbital constriction, the infraorbital foramen being above the P^{4}, low zygomatic arches that take curve upward at the flat glenoid surface, and strong nuchal crests. The retroarticular process of the temporal bone, however, is less developed compared to that of the skull of D. bavarica that was described by Pearson in 1927. In D. minor, the post-tympanic process, which limits the hind area of the ear canal, is more elongated compared to the other preceding species of Diplobune or any anoplotheriine. The occipital condyles are prominent and elongated but are less developed compared to A. commune.

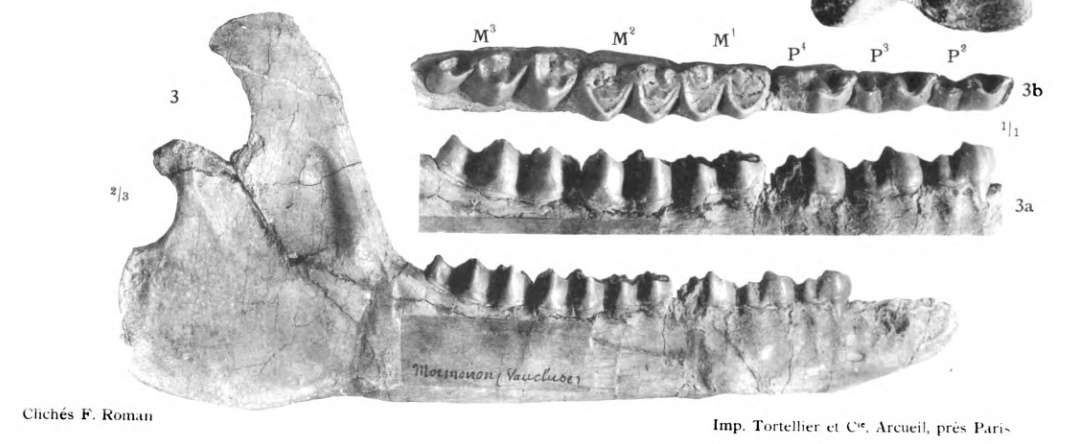
Mandible and dentition of D. secundaria from Mormoiron

One well-preserved adult skull of D. secundaria from Saint-Capraise-d'Eymet measures 281 mm (11.1 in) in length, 177 mm (7.0 in) in maximum width, and 94 mm (3.7 in) in maximum height. The skull itself is large, elongated, and contains a highly developed sagittal crest, circular orbits, the frontal bone and occipital bone which are both elongated towards the back of the skull, a thin and straight zygomatic arch, and small plus stocky temporal bones. Both the nasal bones and the maxilla are elongated, the tip of the latter being rounded. The nasal bones are welded to each other and the maxilla. These traits support the presence of tapered tongues in Diplobune. The sphenopalatine foramen is generally oval and elongated in shape, the pterygoid bones are wavy and in thin striplike shapes, and the basisphenoid bone is triangular and stretched.

The mandibles of Diplobune reveal that its body's height increases towards the rear area, and the angle of the mandible is prominent. The mandibular condyle, at the back of the mandible, has a high position while the mandible's coronoid process has a low position. These traits are more pronounced compared to most other Palaeogene ungulates, although they are not as clearly pronounced in D. minor.

=== Endocast anatomy ===
==== Ear morphology ====
The endocasts of the petrous part of the temporal bone (or petrosals) of Diplobune differ from those of Anoplotherium in several ways. For one, a cavity of the ear in the upper edge of it is rectangular in shape in Diplobune and convex in shape in Anoplotherium. The prominent part of the petrosal of Diplobune shows complicated positions and barely overlap with the skull's underside whereas that of Anoplotherium protrudes strongly around the internal auditory meatus and straightens towards the back area. The portion of the petrosal crest located between the subarcuate fossa and the internal auditory meatus is closer to the upper edge of the periotic bone in Diplobune but closer to the lower edge in Anoplotherium. The subarcuate fossa is closer to the superior petrosal sinus of the brain in Diplobune than in Anoplotherium.

The petrosal of D. minor contains a large, blunt, and flat mastoid region with a large mastoid process, the former of which is inconsistent with the reduced mastoid region of aquatic or semiaquatic artiodactyls. The ear morphology does not exhibit any specialty towards underwater hearing, therefore disproving that Diplobune was specialized for aquatic behaviour. Within the temporal bone, a groove projects outward the subarcuate fossa. The internal acoustic meatus canal of the ear has a deep, oval shape with fixed boundaries from clear edges, containing two roughly equal in size foramina. The petrosal bone in context of the front area near the internal acoustic meatus has a reduced area extension.

In terms of the bony labyrinth (outer wall of the bony ear), the cochlea, a cavity involved in hearing, composes 50% of the total volume of the bony labyrinth. D. minor has a cochlea shape index (or aspect ratio) between 0.62 and 0.72, meaning that its cochlea is pointed instead of flattened in shape. The length of the cochlea of D. minor based on multiple specimens vary, measuring from 18.1 mm (0.71 in) to 19.7 mm (0.78 in) (8% variation).

The D. minor specimen UM ITD 1083 has an estimated interaural distance of 96 mm (3.8 in), translating to a function interaural delay before arrival to the ear of 277 μs (millionths of a second). Based on the measurement in relation to hearing range, D. minor likely had a large high-frequency limit estimate of 44 KHz. Another specimen UM ITD 1081 has an estimated high-frequency limit estimate of 32 kHz and a low-frequency limit of 0.35 kHz. The frequency limits of Diplobune suggest that it was not a specialist in low-level or high-level hearing frequency limit, since its high-level range, between 30 and 44 kHz, is similar to most extant terrestrial artiodactyls while its low-level range, between 0.11 and 0.4 kHz, is high compared to extant artiodactyls. It is not certain whether the equations used for predicting hearing frequency limits of fossil animals are accurate. Either way, Diplobune does not show cochlear morphology for underwater hearing.

==== Brain ====
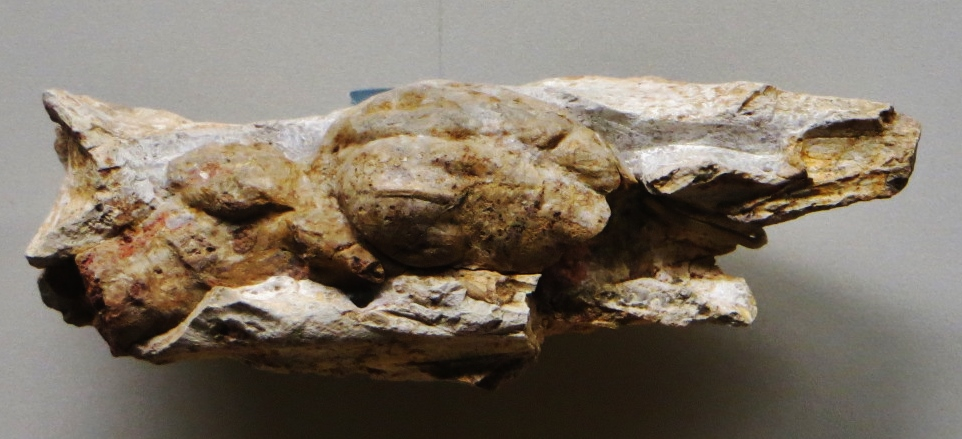
Endocranial cast of Diplobune, Stuttgart State Museum of Natural History

In 1928, palaeoneurologist Tilly Edinger wrote about multiple endocasts of D. bavarica from their skulls from the collection of the State Museum of Natural History Stuttgart, one complete but most others partial. The mostly complete brain cast measures 9.2 cm (3.6 in) long. Its olfactory bulbs measure 0.6 cm (0.24 in), although they may have been incompletely preserved. The bulbs are extensive and fused into one mass. In Diplobune, the cerebellum has a comparable large height to the cerebrum, and neither touch each other. Anoplotheriids were characterized by elongated brains with large olfactory bulbs and a simple, straight, and furrowed cerebrum that did not overlap with the equally wide cerebellum.

In 1969, Colette Dechaseaux conducted an extensive study on known Palaeogene artiodactyls with known endocasts, including on anoplotheriids Anoplotherium and Diplobune. She pointed out that in both, a narrow and deep furrow separates the cerebellum from the cerebrum. The cerebellar vermis is wide and protruding that it is more prominent than the other cerebellar hemispheres. The prominence is not made immediately obvious, however, because of the enlargement of the cerebellar hemispheres due to connection in the outer face with strong petrosal sinuses. The upper view of the cerebral hemisphere reveals its convex shape with a lower area in the front compared to the back. The rhinal area (or nasal area) is close to the upper edge of the neocortex, therefore composing a low frontal lobe compared to the temporal lobe. The sagittal sinus, present on the outer face of the piriform cortex, branches out well on the outer area, especially in the back. Anoplotherium and large species of Diplobune are similar also in the appearance of the back rhinal area.

Despite the major similarities, the brains of anoplotheriid species have several differences. For instance, the exact location of the primary fissure of the cerebellum (or fissura prima) of Anoplotherium is difficult to locate because the cerebellar vermis's front area is hidden by a transverse sinus covering space between the cerebral hemispheres and the cerebellum. In comparison, Diplobune has a transverse sinus attached to the base of the cerebral hemisphere that displays the vermis. In large-sized species of Diplobune, the paleocerebellum is swollen, voluminous, and more spread out in its width compared to the neocerebellum. In small-sized species, two furrows of the vermis are present, one being near the front edge (possibly the fissura prima) and the other being only slightly over half the length of the other. Therefore, the paleocerebella of small species were smaller than the neocerebella.

The widths of the cerebral hemispheres of Diplobune are further back compared to Anoplotherium. The upper surface of the cerebral hemispheres of Diplobune is flatter, and the neocortex lowering forward from the approximate back third of its length so that the latter can connect with the base of the olfactory peduncle. In comparison, the same cerebral hemispheres surface of Anoplotherium is convex, and the neocortex to some extent maintains thickness. The back rhinal area of the brain of Diplobune is rectilinear except for the back end where the area ascends.

=== Dentition ===
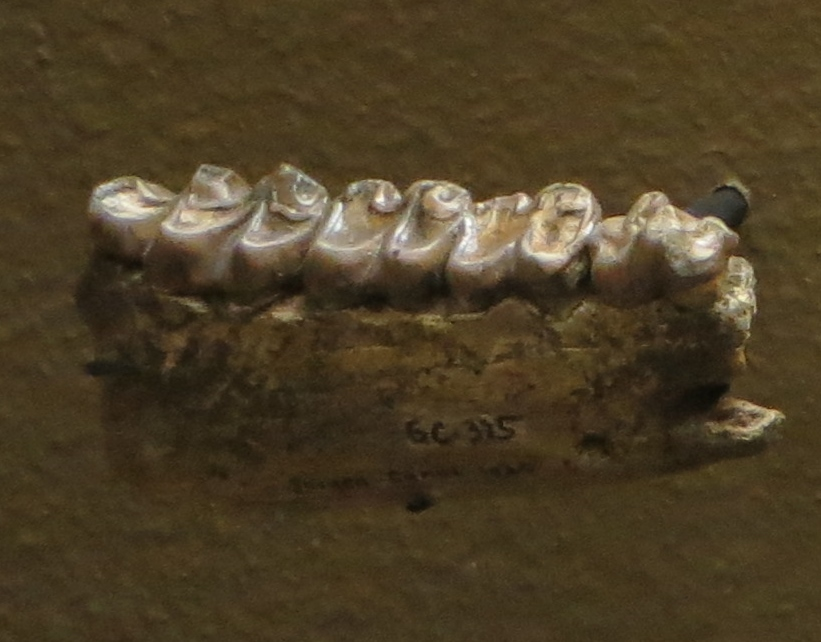
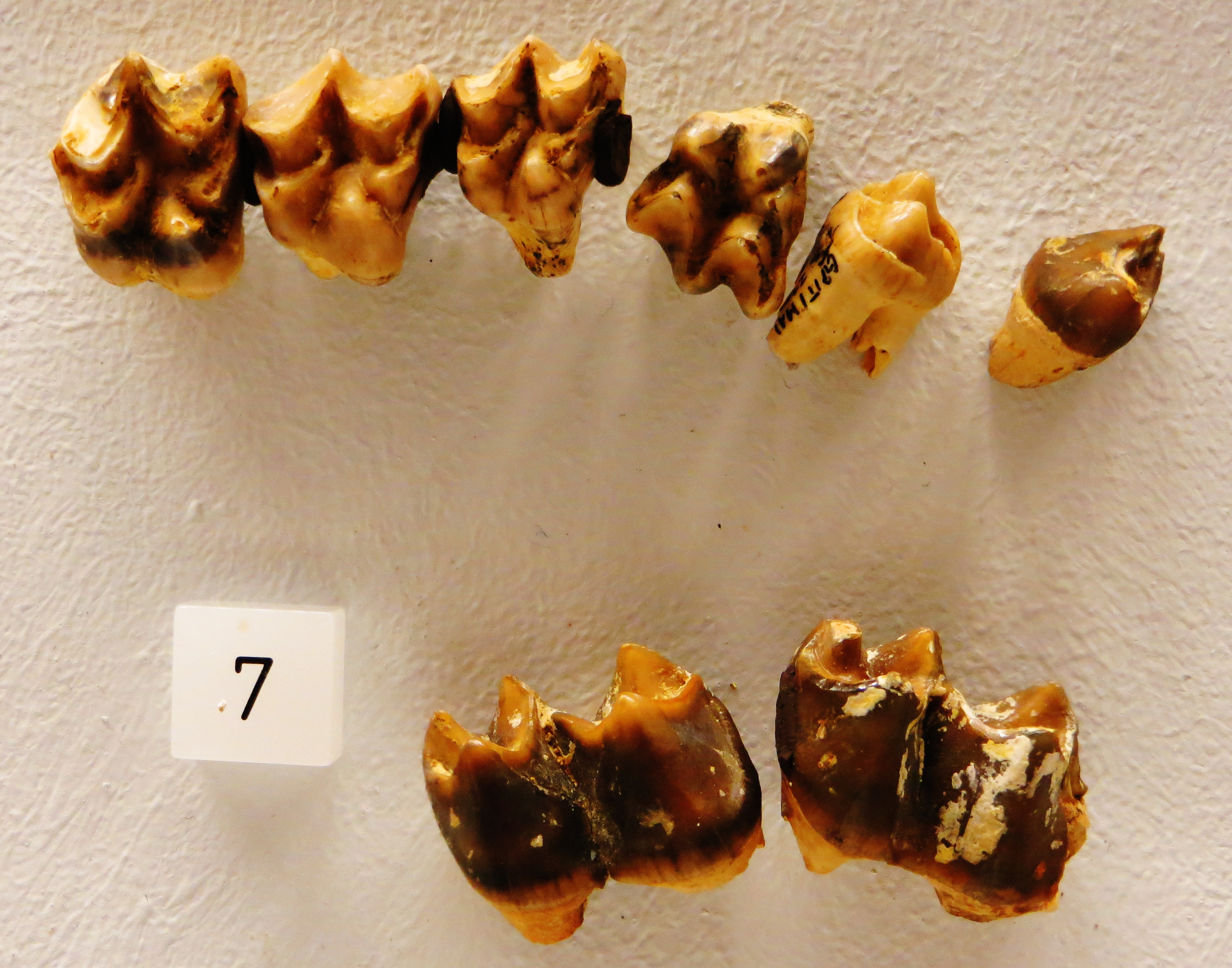
D. secundaria mandible from the Natural History Museum of Basel (left) and D. quercyi teeth from the palaeontological collection of the University of Tübingen (right)

The dental formula of Diplobune and other anoplotheriids is 3.1.4.33.1.4.3 for a total of 44 teeth, consistent with the primitive dental formula for early-middle Palaeogene placental mammals. Anoplotheriids have selenodont (crescent-shaped ridge form) or bunoselenodont (bunodont and selenodont) premolars (P/p) and molars (M/m) made for leaf-browsing diets. The canines (C/c) of the Anoplotheriidae are overall undifferentiated from the incisors (I/i). The lower premolars of the family are piercing and elongated. The upper molars are bunoselenodont in form while the lower molars have selenodont labial cuspids and bunodont (or rounded) lingual cuspids. The subfamily Anoplotheriinae differs from the Dacrytheriinae by the lack of both molariform upper premolars with crescent-shaped paraconules and the lower molars with a third cusp between the metaconid and entoconid.

Diplobune is very similar in dentition to the similarly derived Anoplotherium but differs primarily by the generally smaller sizes and its two front tubercles (crowns) of its lower molars being welded together in a "bicuspid" (or two-pointed) pillarlike shape. Diplobune is also specifically diagnosed by many specific dental traits, making its diagnoses more focused on dental traits compared to Anoplotherium. Its upper incisors are separated by short diastemata. Its I^{1} is large, procumbent, and curved while the I^{2} and I^{3} are smaller and vertically within the premaxilla. In terms of lower incisors, the I_{1} and I_{2} are round in shape and procumbent while the I_{3} has a somewhat triangular shape, all of which are vertically within the maxilla. The canine (C) is undifferentiated from the incisors, typical of the Anoplotheriinae, and it is compressed and linear (or ridged). The P^{1} is canine-like while the P^{2} and P^{3} are relatively elongated and each have a posterolingual heel. The P^{4} is somewhat triangular in shape with a labially prominent parastyle cusp. The P_{4} is small in size. The upper molars are bunoselenodont, have five cusps (meaning that the molar is "pentacuspidate") and have prominent cusp arrangements, consistent with the Anoplotheriidae. The lower molars contain a fusion of the paraconid cusp with the metaconid cusp, giving rise to a mesiodistal cusp that is divided in two.

=== Vertebrae ===
Unlike Anoplotherium, Diplobune is not as well known in remains of vertebrae or ribs. Fraas in 1870 referenced 1 dorsal vertebra, 1 lumbar vertebra, and 6 caudal vertebrae (tail vertebrae) from a museum in Berlin that he thought belonged to Diplobune, the number of tail vertebrae being similar to that of Anoplotherium. The vertebrae were neither illustrated in his source nor referenced in future literature, however, making their statuses unknown. Sudre in 1982 also did not indicate vertebrae specimens but hypothesized that unlike Anoplotherium, the tail of D. minor was not elongated based on apparently known vertebrae.

=== Limbs ===
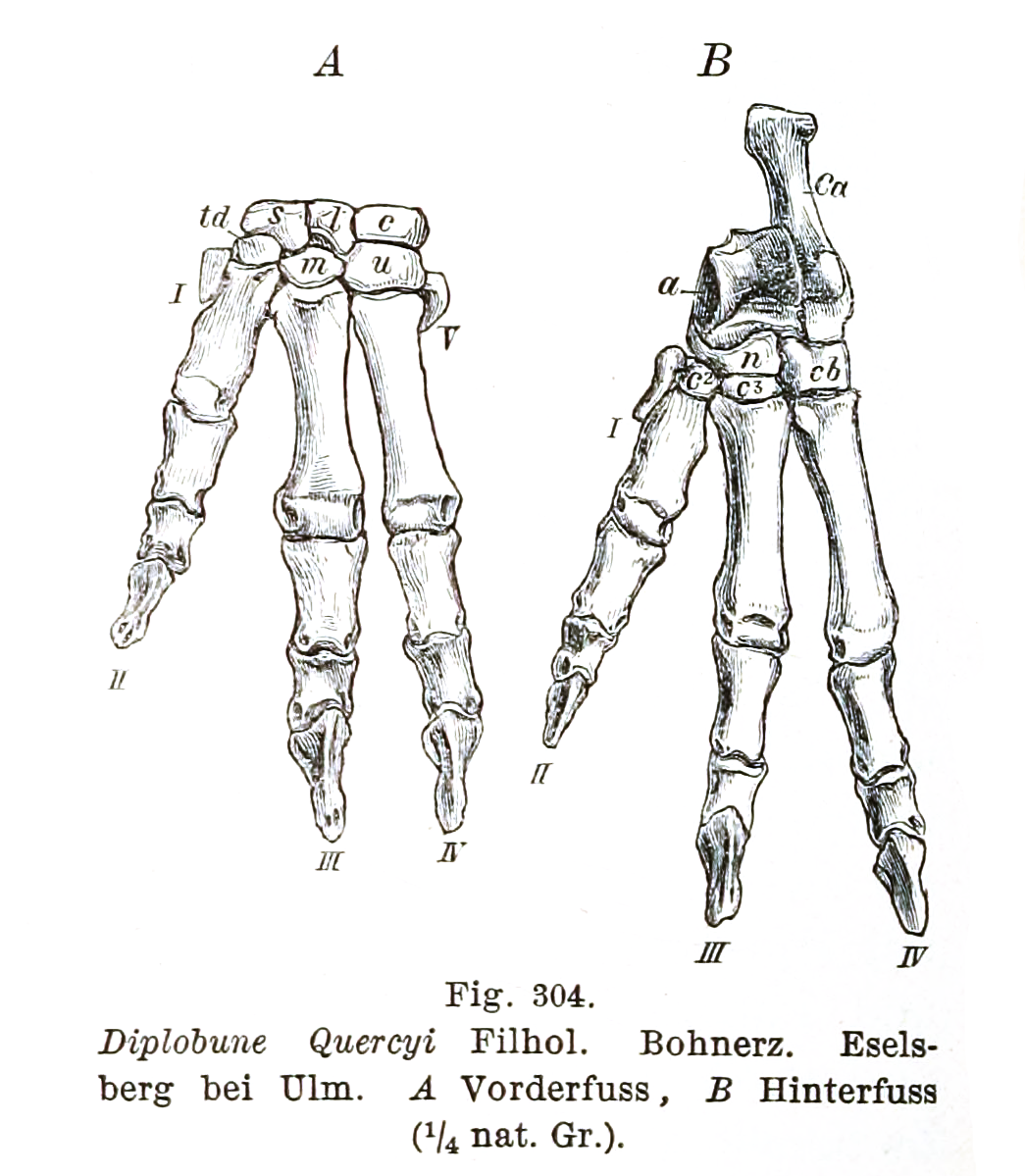
Illustrations of the front foot (A) and hind foot (B) of Diplobune quercyi, 1891–1893. The fingers on each foot are labeled as "II," "III," and "IV."

Unlike typical "even-toed" artiodactyls and Anoplotherium where one species (A. commune) is didactyl (two-toed) as opposed to all other species which are tridactyl (three-toed), all species of Diplobune are tridactyl. Multiple limb fossils are known from D. secundaria, D. quercyi, and D. minor. Diplobune is thought to be semi-digitigrade or fully digitigrade based on its limb morphology, with a common proposed adaptation being proposed for multiple species as a result. The two right-side fingers (fingers III and IV) are similar in terms of long sizes although finger IV is slightly longer while the left finger (finger II) is short and relatively spaced out from the two other fingers. Each finger has three phalanges, the second phalanx being half as long as the first. The articular surface of the third phalanx for the hoof rises on the dorsal side, indicating mobility of the hoof. The hooves of fingers III and IV are asymmetric, similar to both extant terrestrial artiodactyls and Anoplotherium.

==== Front limbs ====
The scapula (or shoulder blade) is triangular, asymmetrical, and wide, its low scapular index value of 118 potentially implying both a broad thorax and support for lateralized movements. The glenoid fossa has a circular shape and is approximately perpendicular to the body of the scapula.

Sudre described a distal part of a right humerus of D. minor in 1974, mentioning that it is at least somewhat analogous to those of D. quercyi and E. filholi. The condyle of the humerus is rounded and spherical, and the lateral lip is "weaker" compared to the preceding Diplobune species. The radial fossa of the humerus is not as marked, but the coronoid fossa of the humerus is well-pronounced in comparison. The trochlea of the humerus of D. minor is much deeper than that of Ephelcomenus, and the medial lip is more oblique than in D. quercyi. The epitrochlea (outer bone projection) of the distal end of the humerus has multiple facets for muscle articulation. The distal end of a complete humerus of D. minor differs from D. quercyi and E. filholi by the lessened lateral lip, greater width of the trochlea, and the great importance of the trochlea. The well-developed epitrochlea suggests powerful muscles linked for bending of the phalanges. The distal end of the femur of anoplotheriines like Diplobune, along with the terminal phalanges, are thought to be similar to those of the agriochoerids Agriochoerus and Diplobunops.

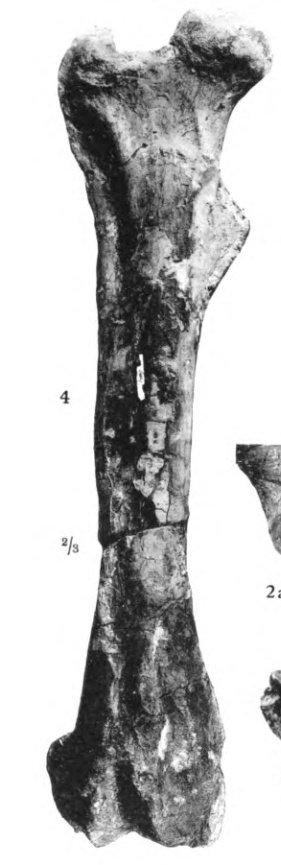
D. secundaria humerus (front side) from Mormoiron

The low surface of the radius of D. minor reveals two articular facet joints for the lunate bone and scaphoid bone, both of which are separated by a transverse ridge. The arrangements of the bones are similar to those of Anoplotherium (with less concave articular facets, however) and the Suidae. The ulna, independent of the radius, has a compressed and stretched lower end, of which Anoplotherium differs from Diplobune by the same end being more quadrangular in outline. The carpal bone arrangements of Diplobune within the front limbs are the lunate bone, scaphoid bone, and triquetral bone in the first row (or bottom row) and the hamate bone (or uncinate bone), capitate bone, and trapezoid bone in the second row.

The shape of the lunate bone is similar to those of both Anoplotherium and the Merycoidodontidae of North America, its front side making a long extension into a corner between the hamate and capitate bones. The contacting of the lunate's face with the hamate is roughly rectilinear in shape while its articulation with the capitate reflects a concave articular facet appearance. These carpal traits are observed to be similar to the agriochoerid Agriochoerus and different from the merycoidodont Merycoidodon. Diplobune differs from Anoplotherium in the lunate bone having a more asymmetrical appearance. The scaphoid has a more elongated and roughly elliptical outline and articulates with the radius in the upper face. The lower face has a small articular facet for the lunate and an extensive, elongated facet that is ridged and articulates with the trapezoid. Both Diplobune and Anoplotherium share evidence of the capitate articulating with the trapezoid. Anoplotherium differs from Diplobune in the simpler facet of the radius that only occupies the front half of the bone surface and bare evidence of the division of the capitate. The lunate bone of Diplobune connects deeply between the hamate and capitate compared to Anoplotherium, limiting lateral wrist movement.

In the 2nd row of the carpus, the trapezoid, capitate, and hamate correspond with metacarpal fingers II, III, and IV, respectively. The trapezoid has an initially flat and strongly concave facet that articulates with the scaphoid and a curved facet that articulates with the capitate. The external area of the trapezoid also has a small articular facet that corresponds to the trapezius surface muscles that indicate a remnant of a "first" finger that is absent by development. The upper face of the capitate is divided by a crest into the smaller portion with a facet for the lunate that articulates at a nearly vertical and straight outline and the larger portion which has a facet for the scaphoid that articulates in an inclined and slightly concave outline. The hamate, which corresponds with the 4th metacarpal, has a small facet for the third. The general arrangements of the carpus of Diplobune are the same as Anoplotherium. However, the digit II of Diplobune compared to Anoplotherium is more mobile because of the more extensive articular surface of the former's trapezoid with the corresponding scaphoid.

==== Hind limbs ====
Sudre also described hind limb remains attributed to D. minor. The femur of D. minor is characterized by its lesser trochanter being close to the spheroidal femoral head, the distance separating them being equivalent to 1/4 of the bone's length as opposed to 1/3 for A. commune and D. secundaria. The morphology of the fibula is typical of those of early ungulates and has a facet on the proximal side for articulation with the tibia. The tibia shows strong backward inclination of the proximal articular surfaces, which indicates a flexed position of the knee. The tibial crest ridge reaches the mid-length area of the diaphysis of the tibia, similar to Anoplotherium.

The calcaneum of Diplobune and other anoplotheriids is robust and short. Its sustentaculum tali (a horizontal shelf known also as the talar shelf) is thin but laterally extensive, the deep tendon flexor muscle being nearly horizontal and making an angle of 90° with the body of the calcaneus. The conditions of the calcaneum suggest that Diplobune was a walking animal rather than a cursorial one. The astragalian facet in the sustentaculum tali while doubled in Anoplotherium is reduced to a simple curved face in D. minor. The cuboidal facet is flattened and oriented in D. minor with an angle of 70° relative to the calcaneum's body, contrasting with the facet being concave in Anoplotherium. The facet is more inclined in D. bavarica with an angle of 45° relative to the calcaneum's body. In anoplotheriines, the semi-cylindrical shape of the articular surface of the calcaneus corresponding to the malleolus probably suggests rigidity of the foot.

The astragalus (or ankle bone) of D. minor is both wide and long but is shorter than that attributed tentatively to D. bavarica? by Schlosser in 1883. The two lips of the proximal trochlea are asymmetrical due to the greater height of the outer lip compared to the inner lip. The lips of the distal trochlea are symmetrical in comparison. The sustentacular facet is bordered in the center by a prominent wrinkle, also present in Suina and basal ruminants but absent in later ruminants. The planar shape of the sustentacular facet might suggests a morphology in between ruminants and suines for a type of lateral mobility of the calcaneus in the area.

The cuboid bone corresponds to the large projection of the calcaneus, the pulley of the astragalus, the scaphoid, a small area of the entocuneiform (the innermost of the three cuneiform bones), and the distal side of metatarsal toe IV. The scaphoid is very thin and corresponds to the astragalus pulley with two similar-sized concave facets with limitations from slight elevation. The cuneiform bones of Diplobune are like Anoplotherium, the entocuneiform being closely attached to the scaphoid and metatarsal II. The mesocuneiform (the middle cuneiform bone) is inserted between the scaphoid and the metatarsal II, the latter of which it weakly touches.

In the metatarsals of Diplobune, their phalanges are slender. The first phalanx of finger II is similar in appearance to the middle phalanges of fingers III and IV. The second phalanges of fingers III and IV reveal a distal, semi-cylindrical joint which extends from the dorsal area to the plantar area, reflecting great mobility of the third phalanx. The distal joint of finger II does not reach up to the dorsal area of the phalanx. The third phalanges of the three fingers are identical and are intermediate in morphology between claw phalanges and hoof phalanges. They start out wide and high at the bottom joint level but then become thinner in the front area and are flattened at the plantar area. The metapodials of D. minor are more elongated in relation to the proximal phalanges with a ratio measurement of the lengths of the metatarsal to the proximal phalanx being 2.2 compared to D. quercyi with a ratio of 1.6. The species D. minor therefore had more gracility (slender builds) compared to the other species.

=== Size ===
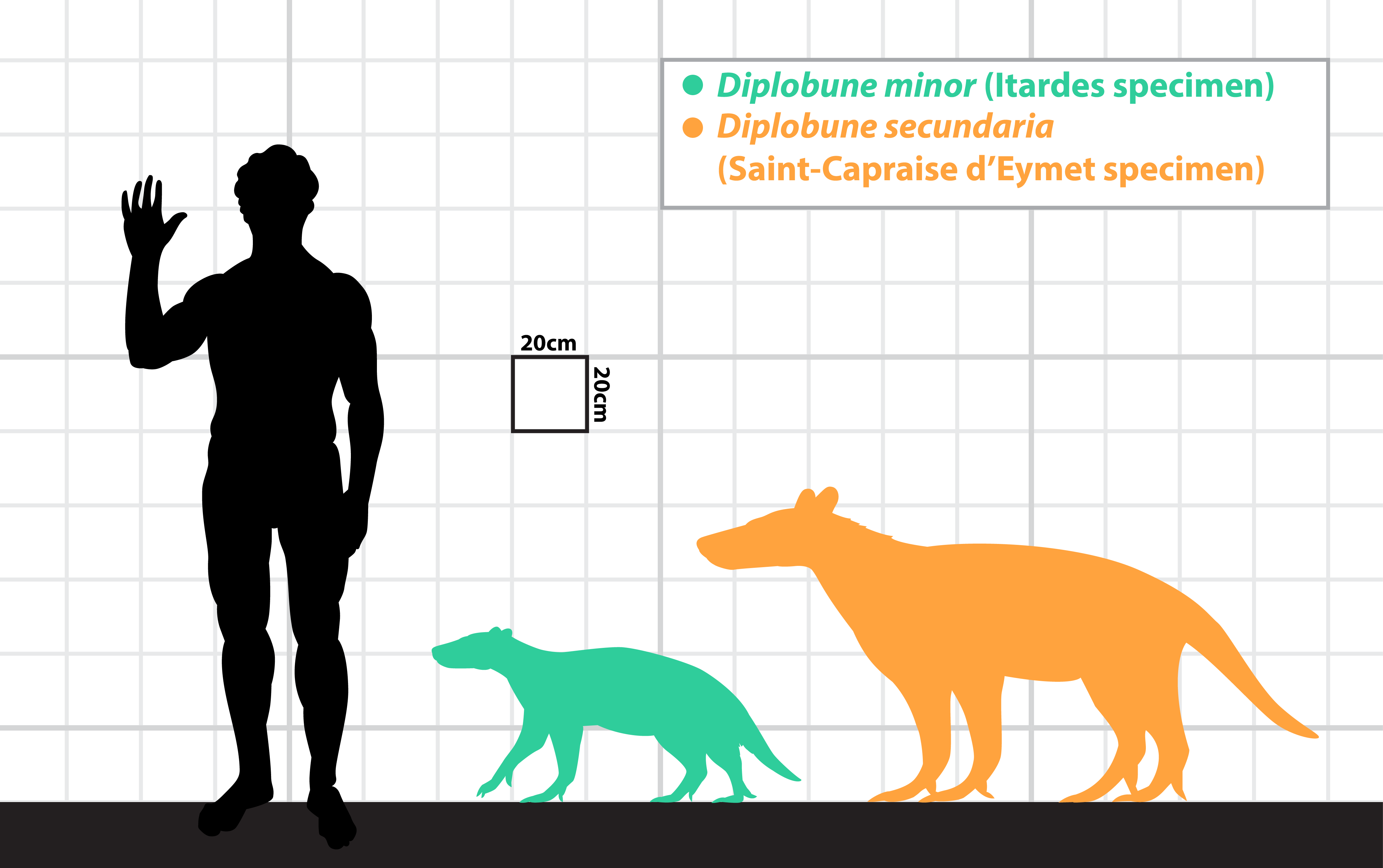
Estimated size comparisons of D. minor and D. secundaria based on known fossil remains

The weight estimates of D. bavarica and D. quercyi have not been offered in any recent study on Diplobune, while D. minor has been subjected to a few weight estimate studies. D. minor has long been suggested to have been the smallest species of its genus since at least 1982. This has been proven in 1995 when Jean-Noël Martinez and Sudre made weight estimates of Palaeogene artiodactyls based on the dimensions of their astragali and M_{1} teeth. The astragali are common bones in fossil assemblages due to their reduced vulnerability to fragmentation as a result of their stocky shape and compact structure, explaining their choice for using it. The two weight estimates for D. minor from the locality of Itardies (MP23) yielded different results, with the M_{1} giving the body mass of 15.867 kg (34.98 lb) and the astragalus yielding 20.369 kg (44.91 lb). These weight estimates were larger than several other artiodactyls in the study but were also smaller than many others. The two researchers considered that the estimated body mass of D. minor based on the M_{1} area is a slight underestimate compared to that of the astragalus.

In 2014, Takehisa Tsubamoto reexamined the relationship between astragalus size and estimated body mass based on extensive studies of extant terrestrial mammals, reapplying the methods to Palaeogene artiodactyls previously tested by Sudre and Martinez. The researcher used linear measurements and their products with adjusted correction factors. Compared to most other artiodactyl estimates, the recalculated body mass of D. minor was slightly higher, the previous underestimates possibly being the result of a shorter astragalus proportion than most other artiodactyls. The results of the body mass estimates of D. minor and other Palaeogene artiodactyls are displayed in the below graph:

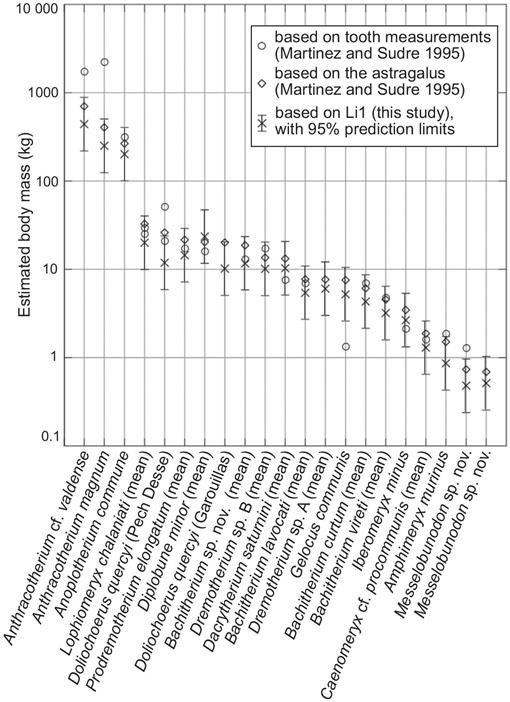
Estimated body masses (kg) of Palaeogene artiodactyls based on recalculated trochlear widths (Li1) in comparison to estimates from Martinez and Sudre (1995)

Maeva J. Orliac et al. suggested in 2017 that the mean body mass of D. minor based on five astragali from Itardies that belong to the species is 19.9 kg (44 lb). Based on a slightly deformed but complete cranium specimen UM ITD 43, which measures 16.5 cm (6.5 in), the estimated body mass is 18.9 kg (42 lb). The mean of the two body mass estimates is 19.4 kg (43 lb). In 2022, Weppe determined based on a body mass formula that D. secundaria, while not as massive as A. commune in weight, was a large herbivore that weighed approximately 130 kg (290 lb).

Cyril Gagnaison and Jean-Jacques Leroux suggested that based on the D. secundaria skull from Saint-Capraise-d'Eymet, the size of the individual would have been approximately 2 m (6 ft 7 in) in length and 1.2 m (3 ft 11 in) in height up to the withers (or the ridge of the shoulder blade).

== Palaeobiology ==
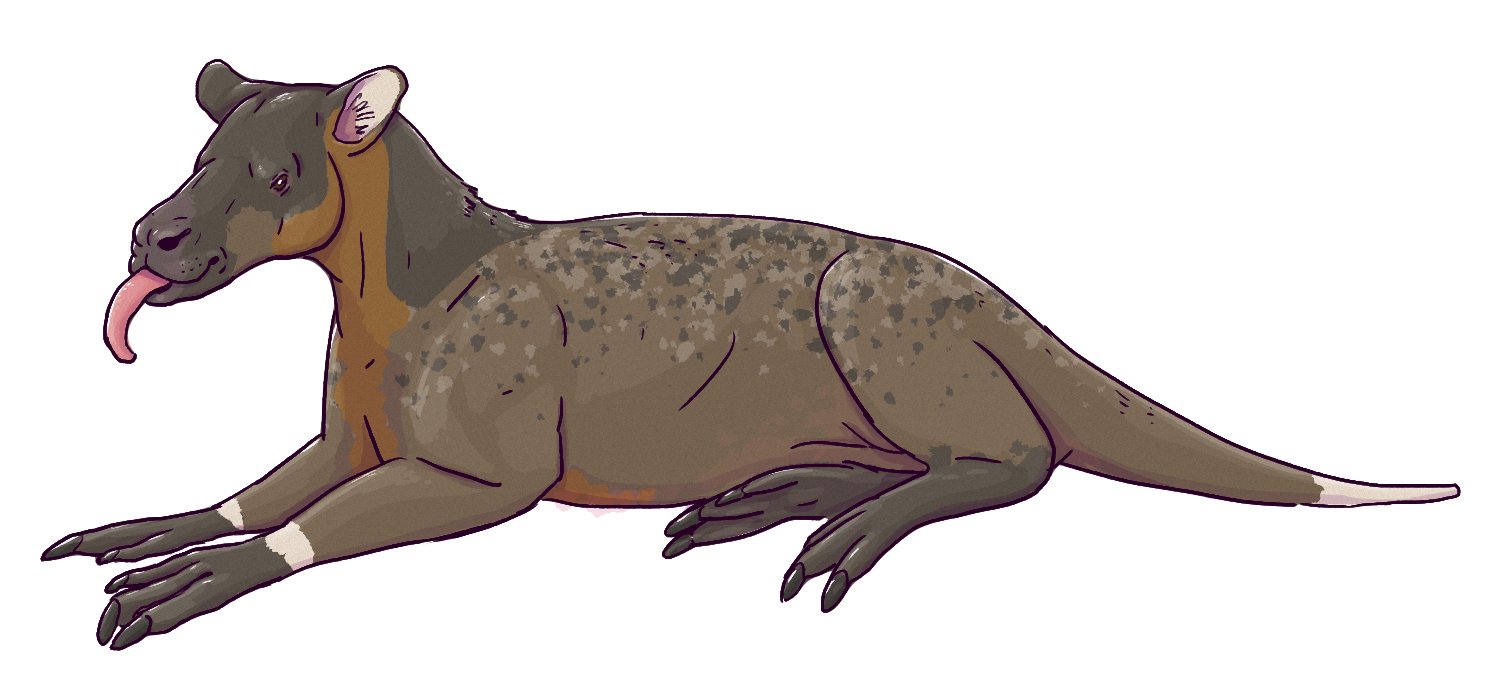
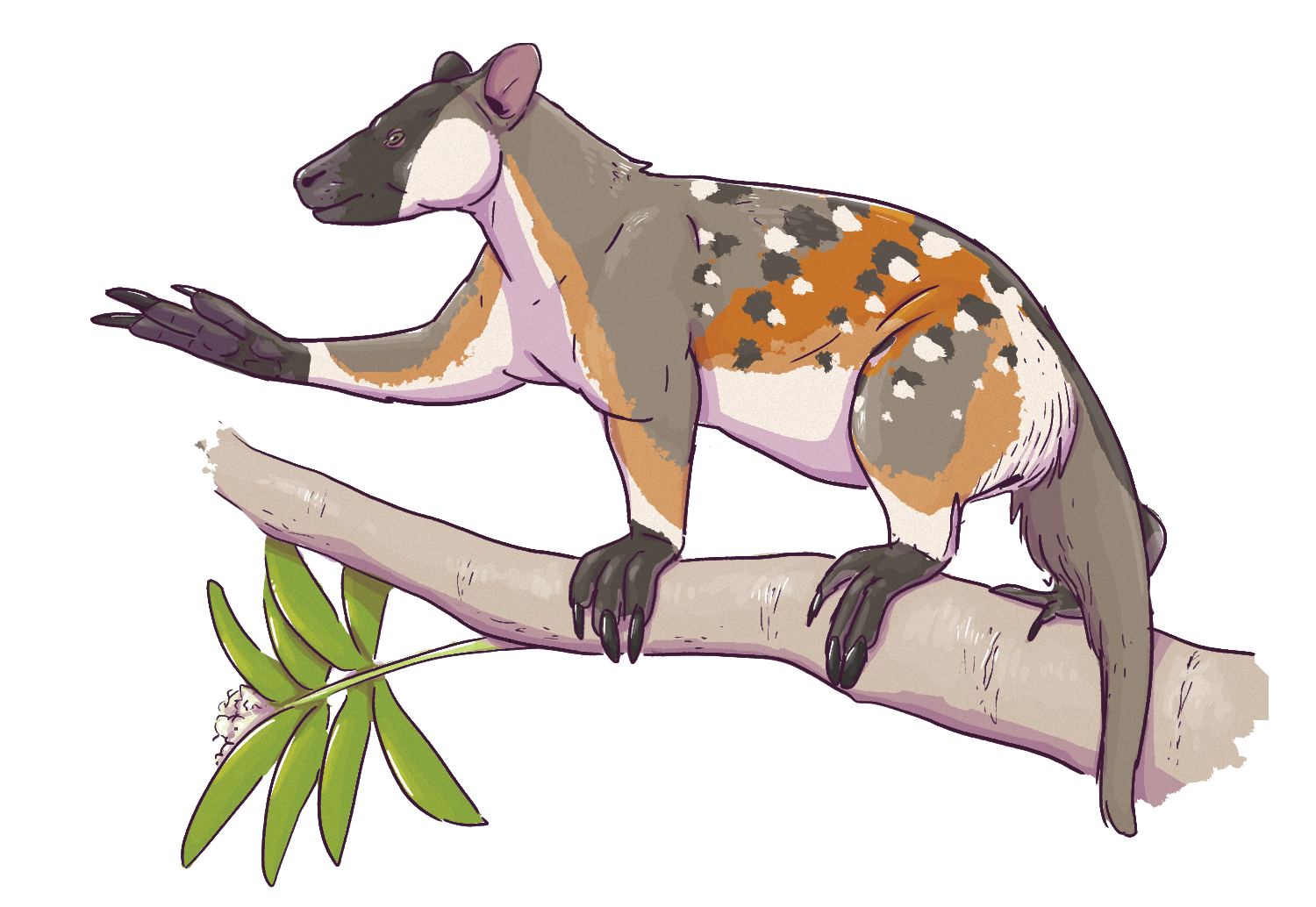
Reconstructions of D. secundaria of the late Eocene-earliest Oligocene (left) and D. minor of the early Oligocene (right)

While the peculiarities of the feet of Diplobune have been well known in the European palaeontological record, the behaviours of Diplobune were only hypothesized as recently as 1982 by Sudre. The palaeontologist suggested that there would be several different hypothesis for locomotion. The first would be that Diplobune walked with its fingers III and IV, folding finger II at the back of its leg, which Sudre rejected due to the prominence of finger II. The second is that Diplobune walked using fingers III and IV, with finger II serving as a brake in progression on soft slopes or muddy banks. This hypothesis would result in the fingers moving away from the axis of the paw in locomotion, so if it was true, the phalanges of fingers III and IV would have been flexible and extensive, the finger II being capable only of flexion. The third is that Diplobune would have been able to grapple on objects during locomotion for movement support, in which finger II would be able to grip onto them. Sudre most supported this hypothesis, recalling that postcranial elements of D. minor (scapula, inclination of the tibial plateau, humeral end) suggest capability of lateralized movements of the forelimb, which would have allowed pronation, or rotational movement, of the forearm and flexed positions from the knee to the hind limb.

There are definitely no modern analogues of Diplobune in terms of ungulates in anatomical specialization, which Sudre recognized as making hypotheses of its palaeobiology bold. However, he suggested that the convergence of dentition with hyracoids may suggest similarities in exploitation of food resources, which in turn may potentially point to similarities in their habits. He hypothesized that D. minor was at least somewhat similar to tree hyraxes (Dendrohyrax) in being to move on reeds, trunks of shrubs, or fallen trees, although he said also that D. minor may have been not been a full analogue. The hypothesis of arborealism/semi-arborealism has also been applied to the entirety of the genus, including D. secundaria, by Métais in 2014. Sudre stated that certain Itardies faunas (the rodent family Theridomyidae, bat family Emballonuridae, amphicyonids, cainotheres, and bachitheriids) suggested more open landscapes while other faunal elements (aplodontiids, sciurids, glirids, and tragulids) pointed to wooded beaches alongside river edges or similar contacts with bodied water sources. He thought that the latter may have been the preferred habitat of D. minor. He also mentioned that D. quercyi was previously suggested by German palaeontologist Kurt Heissig to be linked to habitats with aquatic influences. Therefore, Sudre proposed that D. minor being commonly documented in the locality of Itardies but being unknown in other deposits of similar ages suggest habitat specialization of the species.

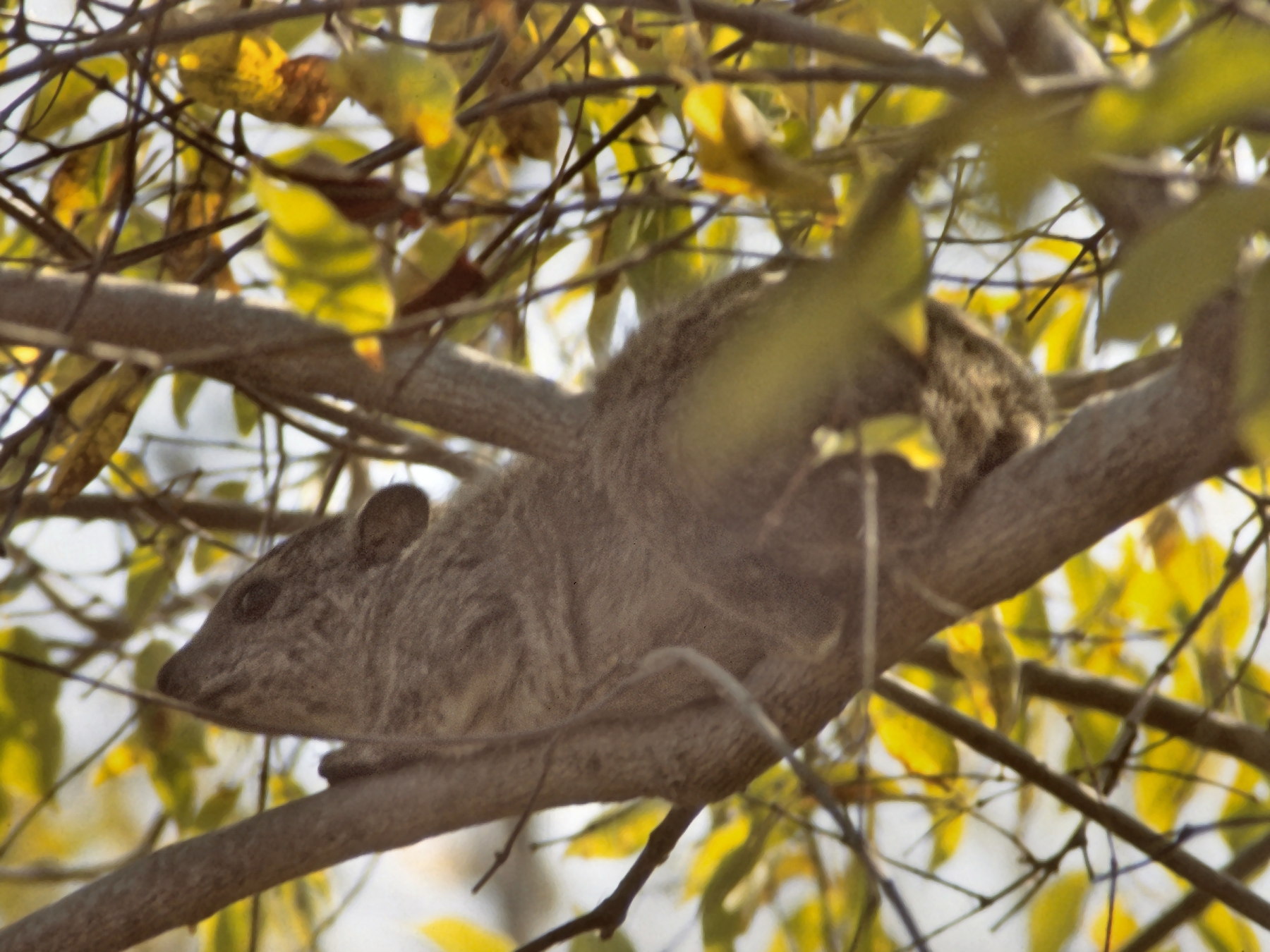
A southern tree hyrax (Dendrohyrax arboreus), an arboreal folivore

Based on agility scores employed for animal locomotion, ranging from 1 as extra slow to 6 as fast, D. minor best fitted in the Category 2 (slow) to Category 3 (medium slow) range of agility scores. Although it is not possible to eliminate it from the Category 1 score (extremely slow like sloths), the lack of variability of inner ear morphologies compared to tragulids suggest unlikeliness of such low speed. D. minor was definitely not a fast-moving animal, however, consistent with its postcranial morphology. Its ear morphology and measurements compared to other artiodactyls do suggest that its locomotion was distinct and peculiar. An aquatic or semi-aquatic lifestyle is eliminated as an option for Diplobune as a result of its ear morphology, currently leaving arborealism/semi-arborealism as the main suggested lifestyle of Diplobune.

The elongated shapes of the nasal bones of at least D. secundaria suggest that it had a long, tapered tongue similar to giraffids, potentially allowing it to pull branches from plants. Its dentition suggests adaptability of chewing harder plants, as the massive, low, and lophoselenodont molars of the species meant that its teeth were capable of tearing through and chewing abrasive plant material like leaves. Gagnaison and Leroux suggested that D. secundaria probably had a more solitary lifestyle, a behaviour originally suggested by Cuvier in 1822. Its possible behaviour of arborealism/semi-arborealism may have allowed it to coexist in the form of niche partitioning with other folivorous browsers like Anoplotherium, a facultative browser, and palaeotheres like Palaeotherium and Plagiolophus, which have small degrees of frugivory. Additionally, the dental wears of Diplobune and Plagiolophus are further evidence that both have significantly different diets from each other. The mesowear for Diplobune, studying the occlusal relief and shape of the tooth cusps and dental microwear, reveals consistently round cusps and high occlusal wear throughout the late Eocene up to the earliest Oligocene plus fewer scratches on the tooth compared to Plagiolophus based on dental microwear. Both consumed increasingly abrasive plant material during the Eocene-Oligocene transition, but Diplobune was purely a folivorous browser and therefore never consumed fruits unlike Plagiolophus.

== Palaeoecology ==
=== Early Pre-Grande Coupure Europe ===
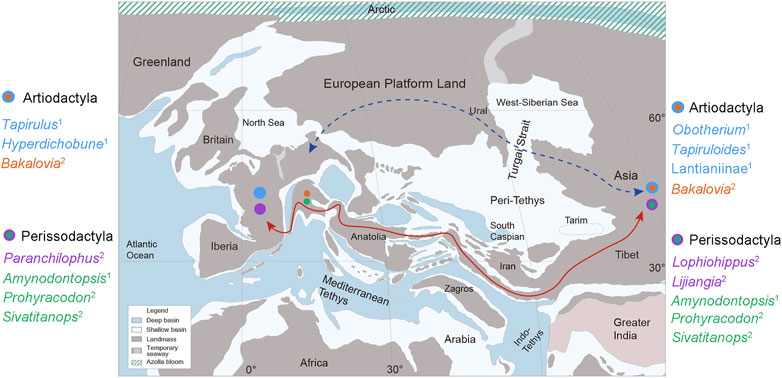
Palaeogeography of Europe and Asia during the middle Eocene with possible artiodactyl and perissodactyl dispersal routes.

For much of the Eocene, a hothouse climate with humid, tropical environments with consistently high precipitations prevailed. Modern mammalian orders including the Perissodactyla, Artiodactyla, and Primates (or the suborder Euprimates) appeared already by the early Eocene, diversifying rapidly and developing dentitions specialized for folivory. The omnivorous forms mostly either switched to folivorous diets or went extinct by the middle Eocene (47–37 million years ago) along with the archaic "condylarths". By the late Eocene (approx. 37–33 mya), most of the ungulate form dentitions shifted from bunodont (or rounded) cusps to cutting ridges (i.e. lophs) for folivorous diets.

Land connections between western Europe and North America were interrupted around 53 Ma. From the early Eocene up until the Grande Coupure extinction event (56–33.9 mya), western Eurasia was separated into three landmasses: western Europe (an archipelago), Balkanatolia (in-between the Paratethys Sea of the north and the Neotethys Ocean of the south), and eastern Eurasia. The Holarctic mammalian faunas of western Europe were therefore mostly isolated from other landmasses including Greenland, Africa, and eastern Eurasia, allowing for endemism to develop. Therefore, the European mammals of the late Eocene (MP17–MP20 of the Mammal Palaeogene zones) were mostly descendants of endemic middle Eocene groups.

The appearances of derived anoplotheriines by MP18 occurred long after the extinction of the endemic European perissodactyl family Lophiodontidae in MP16, including the largest lophiodont Lophiodon lautricense, which weighed over 2,000 kg (4,400 lb). The extinction of the Lophiodontidae was part of a faunal turnover, which likely was the result of a shift from humid and highly tropical environments to drier and more temperate forests with open areas and more abrasive vegetation. The surviving herbivorous faunas shifted their dentitions and dietary strategies accordingly to adapt to abrasive and seasonal vegetation. The environments were still subhumid and full of subtropical evergreen forests, however. The Palaeotheriidae was the sole remaining European perissodactyl group, and frugivorous-folivorous or purely folivorous artiodactyls became the dominant group in western Europe. MP16 also marked the last appearances of most European crocodylomorphs, of which the aligatoroid Diplocynodon was the only survivor due to seemingly adapting to the general decline of tropical climates of the late Eocene.

The temporal range of D. bavarica is uncertain, as they are not currently recognized in the Mammal Palaeogene faunal zones. As a result, only D. secundaria, D. quercyi, and D. minor have recognized temporal ranges, from MP18 to MP20, from MP19 to MP21, and from MP22 to MP23, respectively.

=== Late Eocene ===
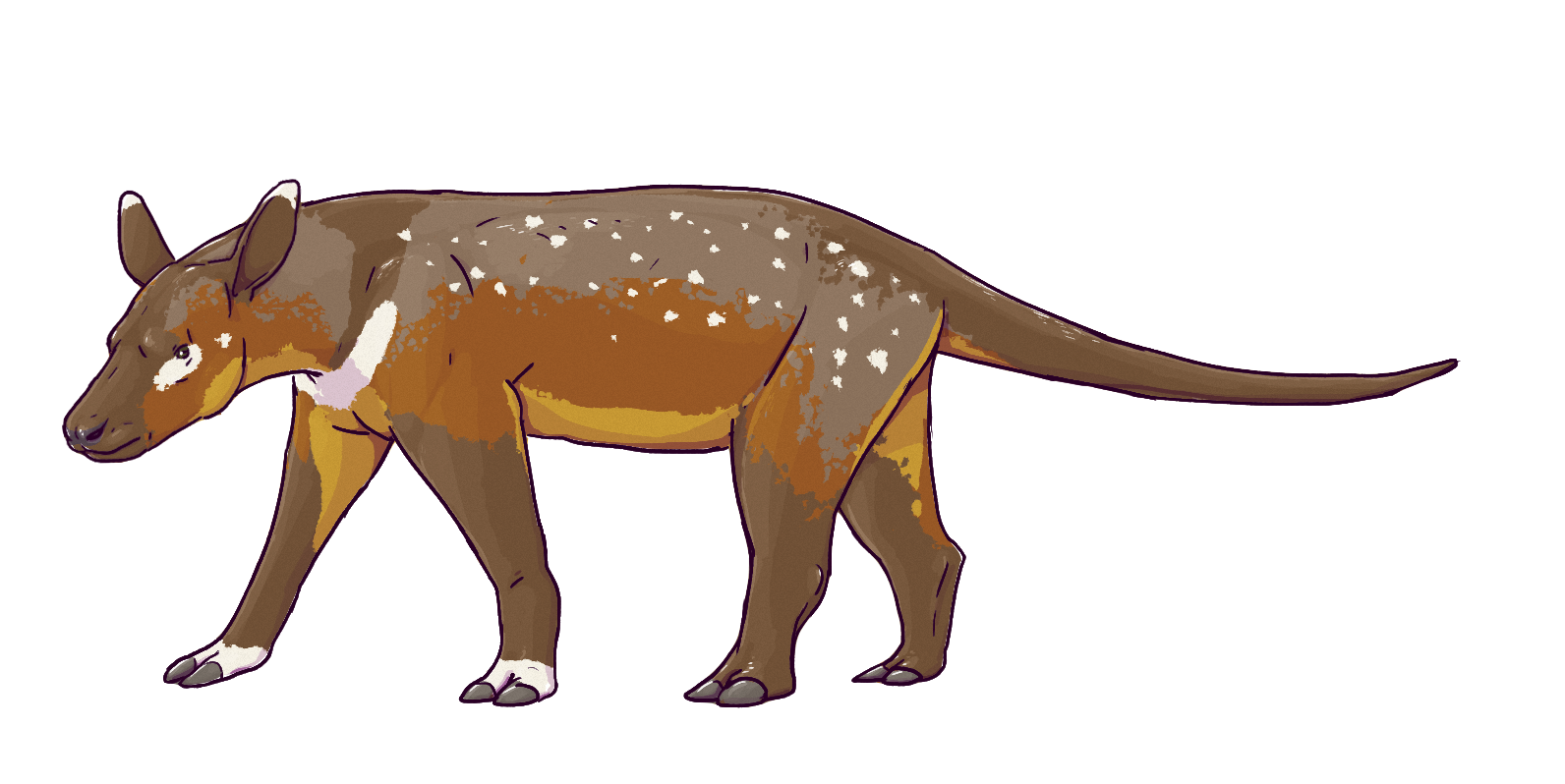
Reconstruction of A. commune. Anoplotherium and Diplobune commonly coexisted with each other based on being often found in many of the same Late Eocene localities.

After a considerable gap in anoplotheriine fossils in MP17a and MP17b, the derived anoplotheriines Anoplotherium and Diplobune made their first known appearances in the MP18 unit. They were exclusive to the western European archipelago, but their exact origins and dispersal routes are unknown. By then, Anoplotherium and Diplobune lived in Central Europe (then an island) and the Iberian Peninsula, only the former genus of which later dispersed into southern England by MP19 due to the apparent lack of ocean barriers.

Diplobune coexisted with a wide diversity of artiodactyls in western Europe by MP18, ranging from the more widespread Dichobunidae, Tapirulidae, and Anthracotheriidae to many other endemic families consisting of the Xiphodontidae, Choeropotamidae (recently determined to be polyphyletic, however), Cebochoeridae, Amphimerycidae, and Cainotheriidae. Diplobune also coexisted with palaeotheriids, including those endemic to the Iberian Peninsula until MP19 when they were replaced by typical palaeothere genera. Late Eocene European groups of the clade Ferae represented predominantly the Hyaenodonta (Hyaenodontinae, Hyainailourinae, and Proviverrinae) but also contained Carnivoramorpha (Miacidae) and Carnivora (small-sized Amphicyonidae). Other mammal groups present in the late Eocene of western Europe represented the leptictidans (Pseudorhyncocyonidae), primates (Adapoidea and Omomyoidea), eulipotyphlans (Nyctitheriidae), chiropterans, herpetotheriids, apatotherians, and endemic rodents (Pseudosciuridae, Theridomyidae, and Gliridae). The alligatoroid Diplocynodon, present only in Europe since the upper Paleocene, coexisted with pre-Grande Coupure faunas as well, likely consuming insects, fish, frogs, and eggs due to prey partitioning previously with other crocodylomorphs that had since died out by the late Eocene. In addition to snakes, frogs, and salamandrids, rich assemblage of lizards are known in western Europe as well from MP16-MP20, representing the Iguanidae, Lacertidae, Gekkonidae, Agamidae, Scincidae, Helodermatidae, and Varanoidea, most of which were able to thrive in the warm temperatures of western Europe.

The MP18 locality of La Débruge of France indicates that D. secundaria coexisted with a wide variety of mammals, namely the herpetotheriid Peratherium, rodents (Blainvillimys, Theridomys, Plesiarctomys, Glamys), hyaenodonts (Hyaenodon and Pterodon), amphicyonid Cynodictis, palaeotheres (Plagiolophus, Anchilophus, Palaeotherium), dichobunid Dichobune, choeropotamid Choeropotamus, cebochoerids Cebochoerus and Acotherulum, anoplotheriids Dacrytherium and Anoplotherium, tapirulid Tapirulus, xiphodonts Xiphodon and Dichodon, cainothere Oxacron, amphimerycid Amphimeryx, and the anthracothere Elomeryx. The MP19 locality of Escamps has similar faunas but also includes the herpetotheriid Amphiperatherium, pseudorhyncocyonid Pseudorhyncocyon, bats (Hipposideros, Vaylatsia, Vespertiliavus, Stehlinia), primates (Microchoerus, Palaeolemur), cainothere Paroxacron, and xiphodont Haplomeryx.

=== Grande Coupure ===
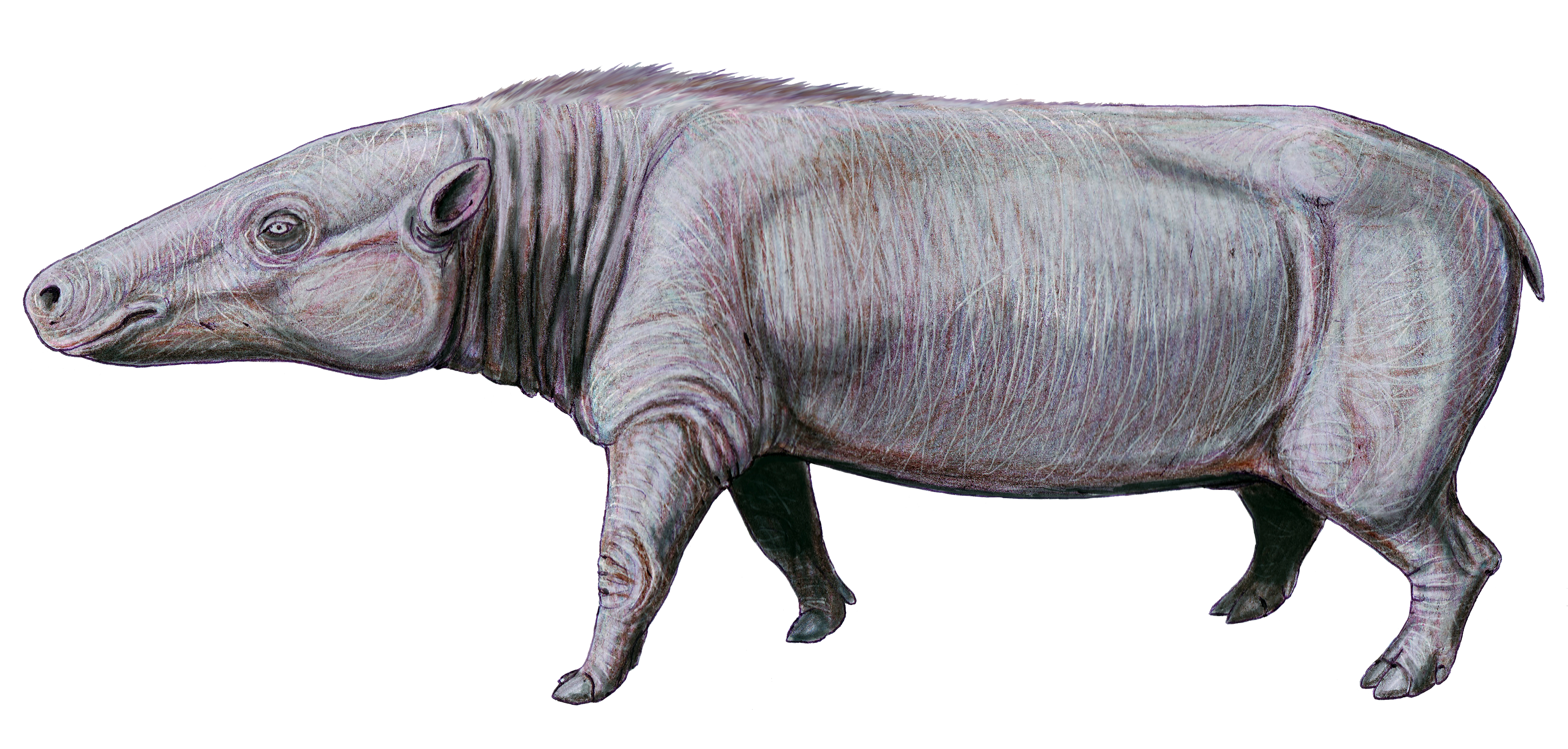
Restoration of Anthracotherium magnum, an anthracothere genus that arrived in western by the Grande Coupure

The Grande Coupure event of western Europe is well-recognized in the palaeontological record as one of the largest extinction and faunal turnover events in the Cenozoic era. The event is coincident with climate forcing events of cooler and more seasonal climates, the result being a 60% extinction rate of western European mammalian lineages while Asian faunal immigrants replaced them. The Grande Coupure is often marked by palaeontologists as part of the Eocene-Oligocene boundary as a result at 33.9 Ma, although some estimate that the event began 33.6-33.4 Ma. The event correlates directly with or after the Eocene-Oligocene transition, an abrupt shift from a greenhouse world characterizing much of the Paleogene to a coolhouse/icehouse world of the early Oligocene onwards. The massive drop in temperatures stems from the first major expansion of the Antarctic ice sheets that caused drastic pCO_{2} decreases and an estimated drop of ~70 m (230 ft) in sea level.

The seaway dynamics separating western Europe from other landmasses to strong extents but allowing for some levels of dispersals prior to the Grande Coupure are complicated and contentious, but many palaeontologists agreed that glaciation and the resulting drops in sea level played major roles in the drying of the seaways previously acting as major barriers to eastern migrants from Balkanatolia and western Europe. The Turgai Strait is often proposed as the main European seaway barrier prior to the Grande Coupure, but some researchers challenged this perception recently, arguing that it completely receded already 37 Ma, long before the Eocene-Oligocene transition. Alexis Licht et al. suggested that the Grande Coupure could have possibly been synchronous with the Oi-1 glaciation (33.5 Ma), which records a decline in atmospheric CO_{2}, boosting the Antarctic glaciation that already started by the Eocene-Oligocene transition. The Oi-1 glaciation, similar to the first glaciation event, caused large drops in sea level and pushed the global climate towards a coolhouse/icehouse environment. The extinctions of a majority of endemic artiodactyls have been attributed to competition with immigrant faunas, environmental changes from cooling climates, or some combination of the two.

The earliest Oligocene marked the arrivals of later anthracotheres, entelodonts, ruminants (Gelocidae, Lophiomerycidae), rhinocerotoids (Rhinocerotidae, Amynodontidae, Eggysodontidae), carnivorans (later Amphicyonidae, Amphicynodontidae, Nimravidae, and Ursidae), eastern Eurasian rodents (Eomyidae, Cricetidae, and Castoridae), and eulipotyphlans (Erinaceidae).

The Grande Coupure saw the extinctions of many artiodactyl genera previously endemic of Europe, including Anoplotherium and all representatives of "choeropotamids" (Amphirhagatherium, Choeropotamus), xiphodontids (Xiphodon, Dichodon) and amphimerycids (Amphimeryx). Several ungulate genera like Palaeotherium and Acotherulum survived the Grande Coupure but nonetheless went extinct by MP21. Diplobune secundaria had a last appearance date of MP20 with various other mammal species as evident by the locality of Saint-Capraise-D'Eymet, suggesting extinction by the Grande Coupure. As a result of unclear stratigraphic ranges of several species of Diplobune, it is unclear which species survived and eventually evolved to D. minor by MP22. D. quercyi is last recorded at the German locality of Möhren 19, which dates to MP21.

=== Early Oligocene ===
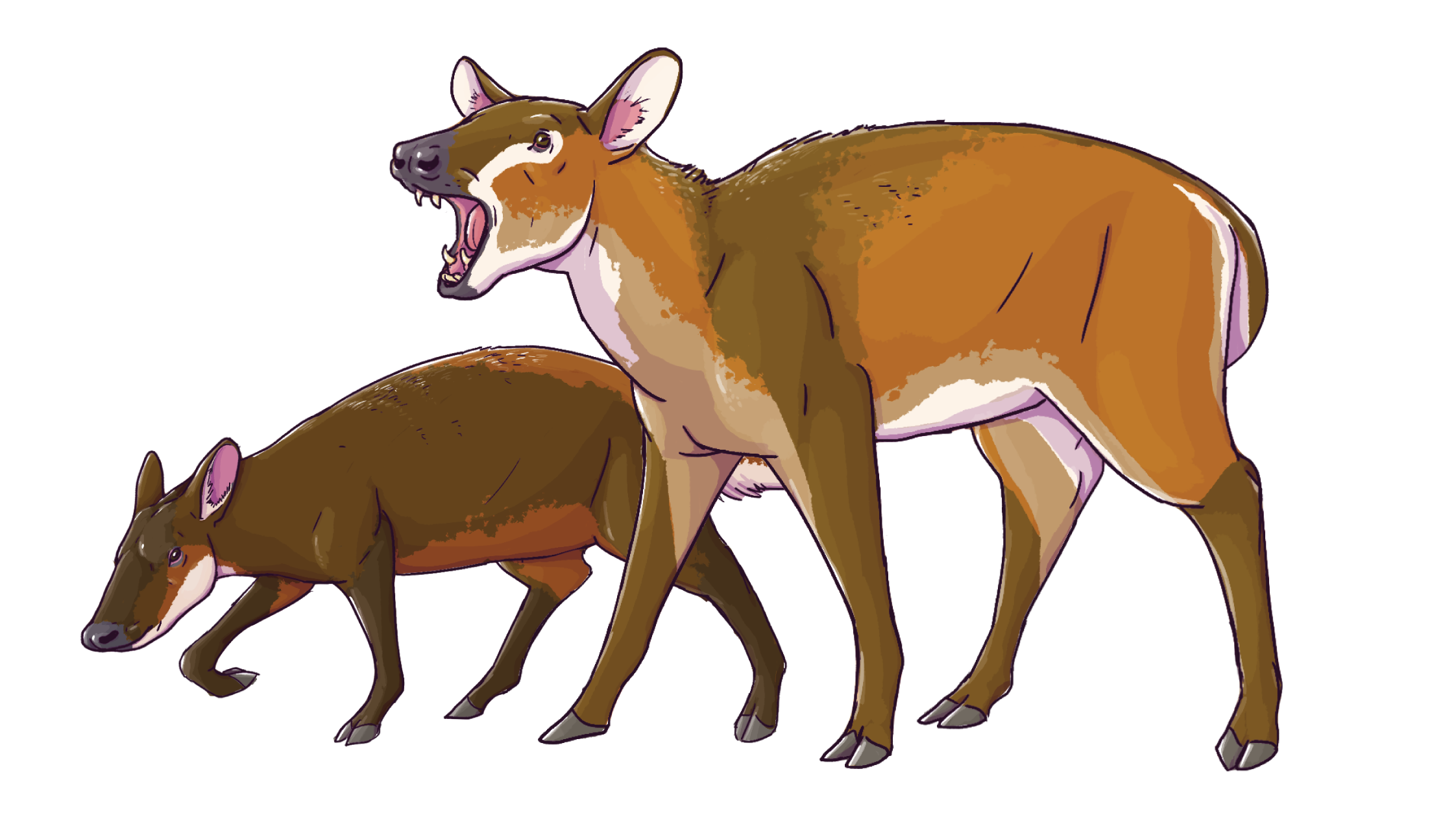
Bachitherium, a namesake arrival of the Bachitherium Dispersal Event

As a result of the Grande Coupure, there are few post-Grande Coupure sites that contain any anoplotheriid. The only anoplotheriid genus with guaranteed survival was Diplobune, with the stratigraphic range of Ephelcomenus being still unresolved. The last species of Diplobune was D. minor with the latest temporal range of MP22-MP23. D. minor is known from the localities of Calaf in Spain (MP22) and Itardies in France (MP23).

In the former, D. minor was found with the herpetotheriid Peratherium, theridomyid Theridomys, anoplotheriid Ephelcomenus(?), and the anthracothere Bothriodon, the last of which is known to be an Asian immigrant. The faunas appeared to have been part of forested and humid conditions.

BY MP23, a known faunal event known as the Bachitherium Dispersal Event had already occurred, where Bachitherium and associated rodents previously unable to expand through westernmost Europe were later able to do so and where the tragulid Iberomeryx dispersed from Asia to western Europe using the same route as the Bachitherium-associated faunas. D. minor was most likely a habitat specialist preferring forested habitats linked to freshwater environments, evident by the lack of Diplobune fossils in other MP23 localities. The deposit of Itardies, in addition to D. minor, yielded remains of the herpetotheriid Amphiperatherium, nyctithere Darbonetus, erinaceid Tetracus, various bats, large assemblages of rodents, hyaenodonts Hyaenodon and Thereutherium, amphicynodont Amphicynodon, enigmatic feliforms (Stenogale, Stenoplesictis, and Palaeogale), nimravid Nimravus, palaeothere Plagiolophus, rhinocerotid Ronzotherium, cainotheres Plesiomeryx and Caenomeryx, tragulid Iberomeryx, and the bachitheriid Bachitherium.

== See also ==
- Anoplotherium
- Dacrytherium
