= Hyaloid fossa =

Space of the eye

Details

Identifiers
- Latin: fossa hyaloidea
- TA98: A15.2.06.011
- TA2: 6810
- FMA: 58843

The hyaloid fossa is a depression on the anterior surface of the vitreous body in which lines the crystalline lens. The name hyaloid fossa is synonymous with patellar fossa.

The lens is lined by capsular epithelium.

Accumulation of fluid—blood or exudates—can occur in the potential space in which it creates between the vitreous and the lens, called the retrolenticular space.
