= Gart der Gesundheit =

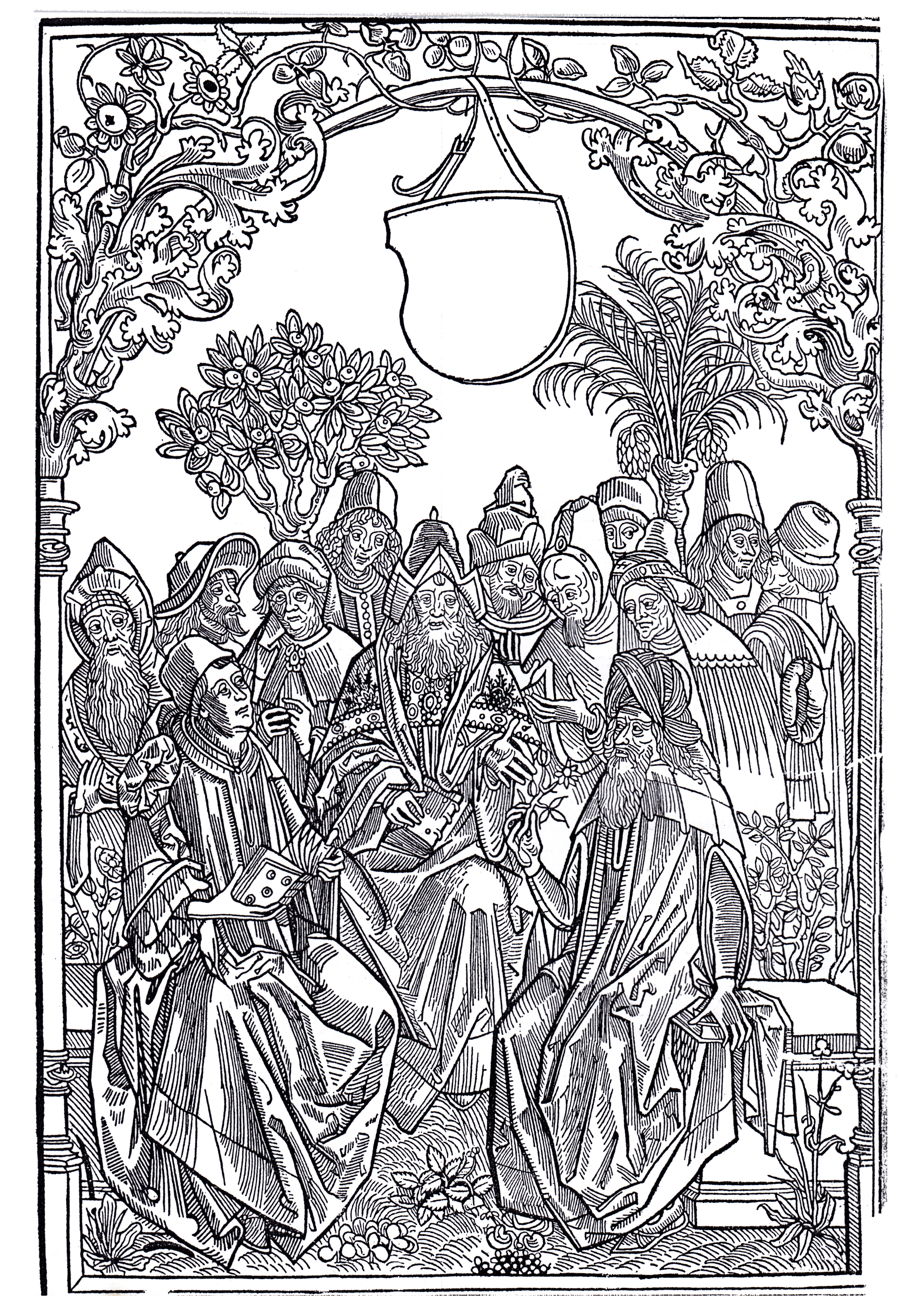
Gart der Gesundheit, Mainz 1485. Titlepage

The Gart der Gesundheit (Early German for Latin hortus sanitatis) was edited in 1485. It was written by Johann Wonnecke von Kaub and is one of the first printed herbals in German. It was often reprinted until the 18th century. The Gart der Gesundheit is an important late medieval work concerning the knowledge of natural history, especially that of medicinal plants. In 435 chapters 382 plants, 25 drugs from the animal kingdom and 28 minerals are described and illustrated. The book was edited by Peter Schöffer in Mainz. Together with the Latin Herbarius moguntinus (Peter Schöffer 1484) and the Latin Hortus sanitatis (Jacob Meydenbach in Mainz 1491), the Gart der Gesundheit belongs to the "group of Mainz herbal incunabula".

== Text ==
The text is a collection of earlier texts in German and in Latin on drugs from the herbal, animal, and mineral kingdoms. The reader cannot rely on the names the author gives to his citations. Sometimes he gives no name, for example for the citations he took from the Physica of Hildegard of Bingen. More often, he even gives incorrect names to his citations.

== Illustrations ==
About 100 of the 379 illustrations in the Gart der Gesundheit are of high standard quality. Erhard Reuwich is supposed to be the creator of these woodcuts, who depict the character of plants in clear lines. Opposing to some modern authors, who called these illustrations "primitive" in a bad sense, Arnold C. Klebs stated in 1925:

"We who today in our aesthetic demands are drawing away more and more from the slavish copying of nature and demand that a work of art expresses type and character, can better appreciate the didactic value of these simple drawings than the previous generation to whom the photographic appealed as the highest form of truthful representation."

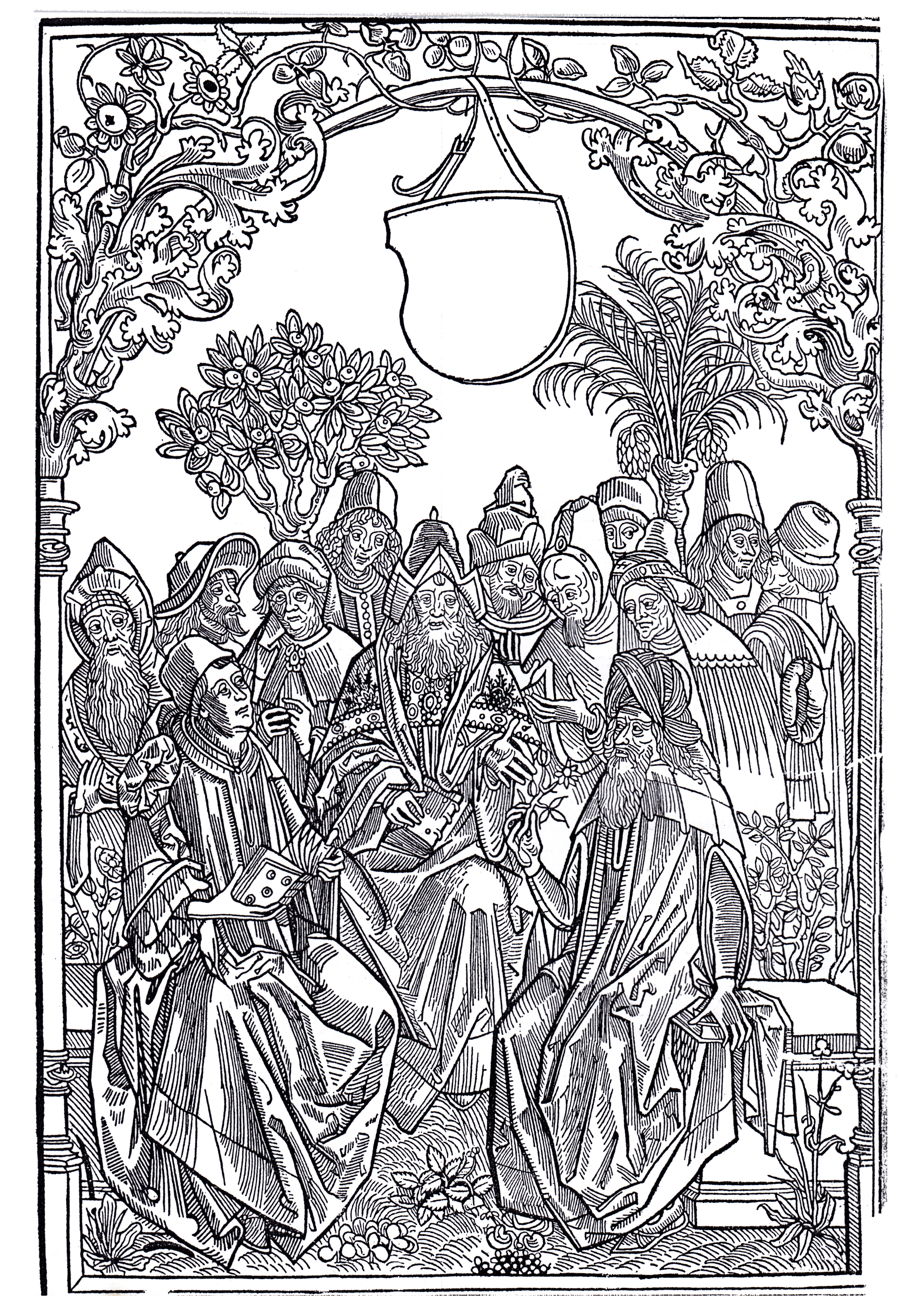
Titlepage

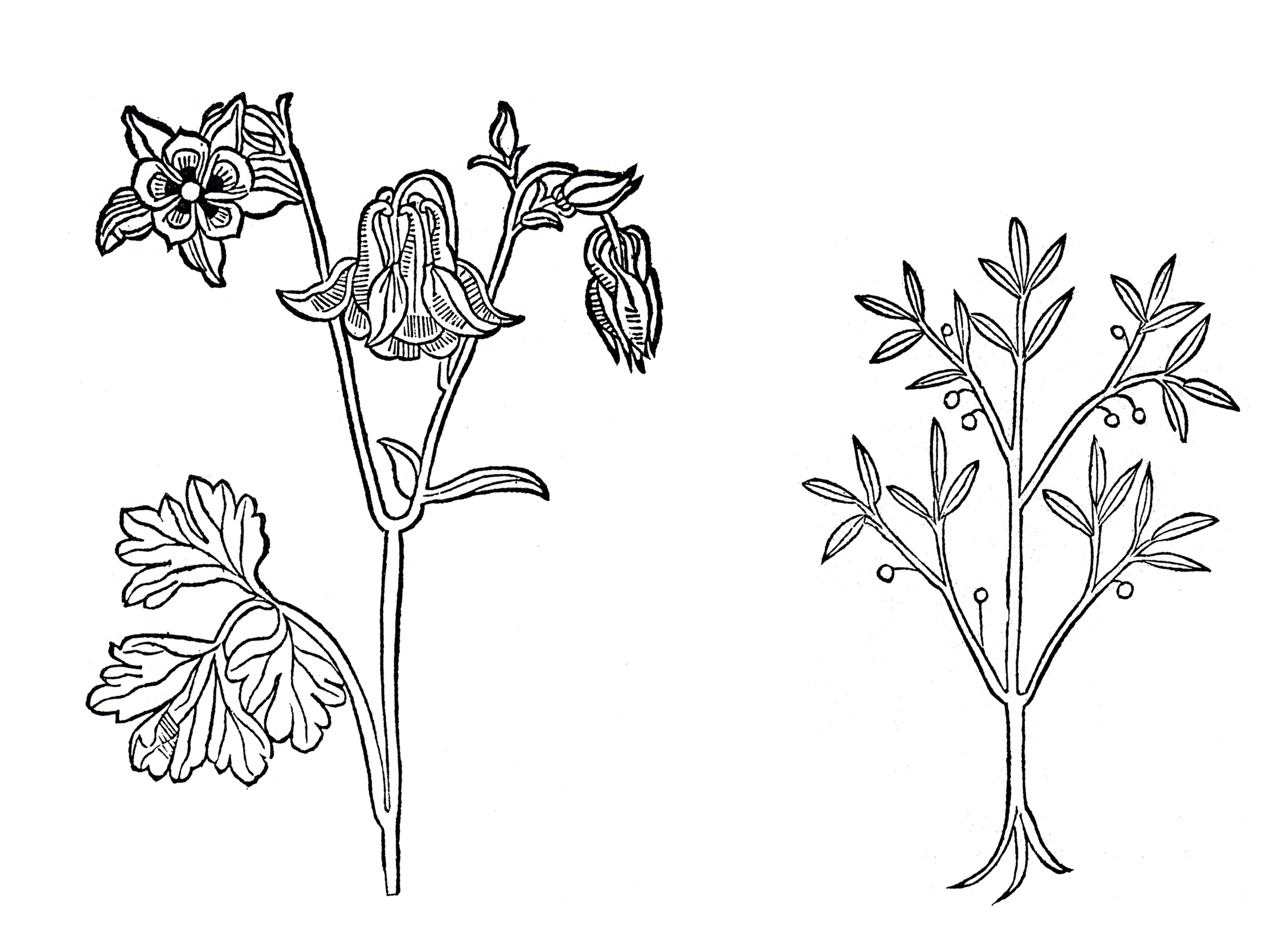
Figure examples. Left - true to nature: Egilops (Chapt. 162). Right - not true to nature: Cassia lignea (Chapt. 126)

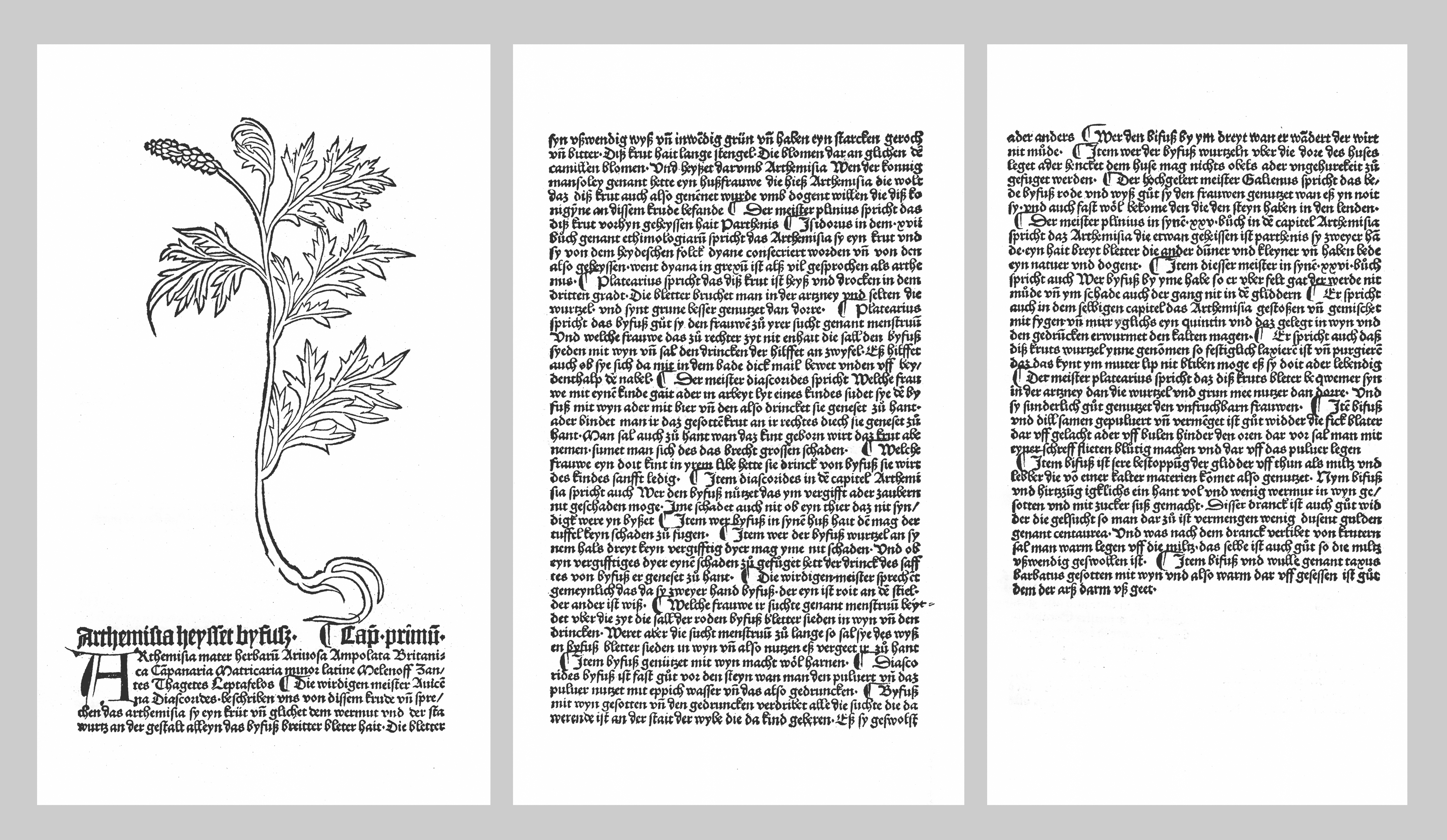
Chapter 1. Artemiſia heyſſet byfuſz

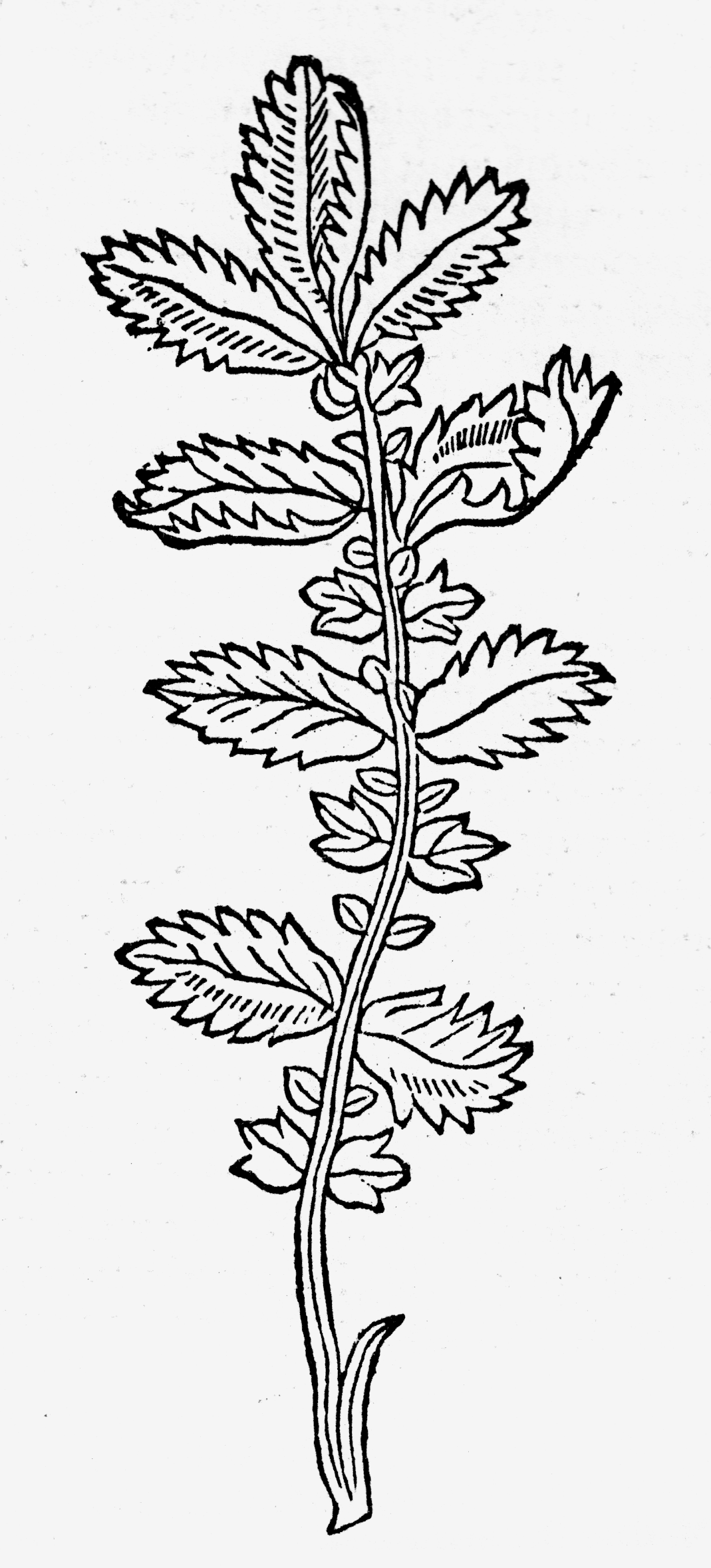
Chapter 5. Agrimonia – 0dermynge

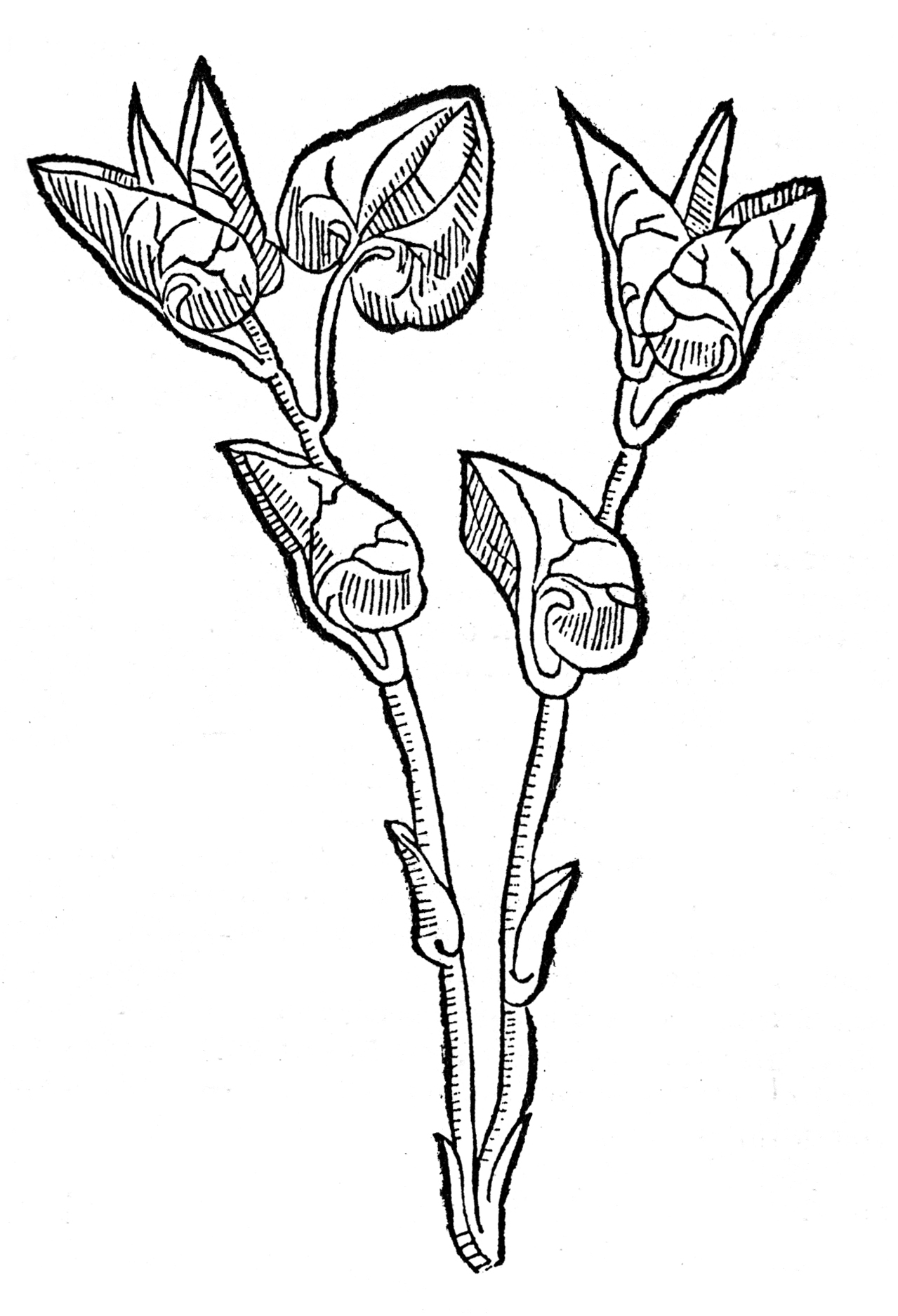
Chapter 11. Aristologia – osterlutzye

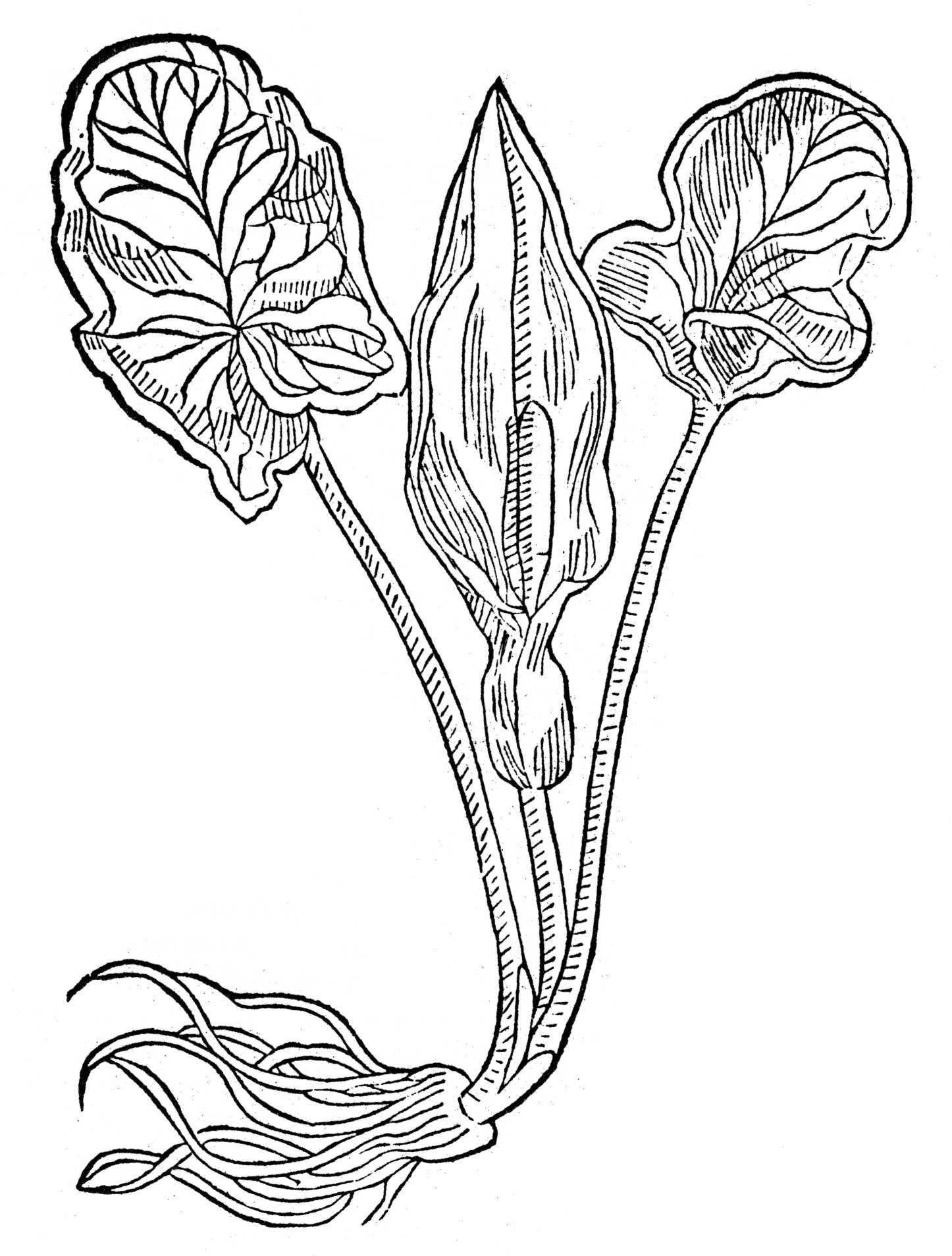
Chapter 16. Aaron – aron

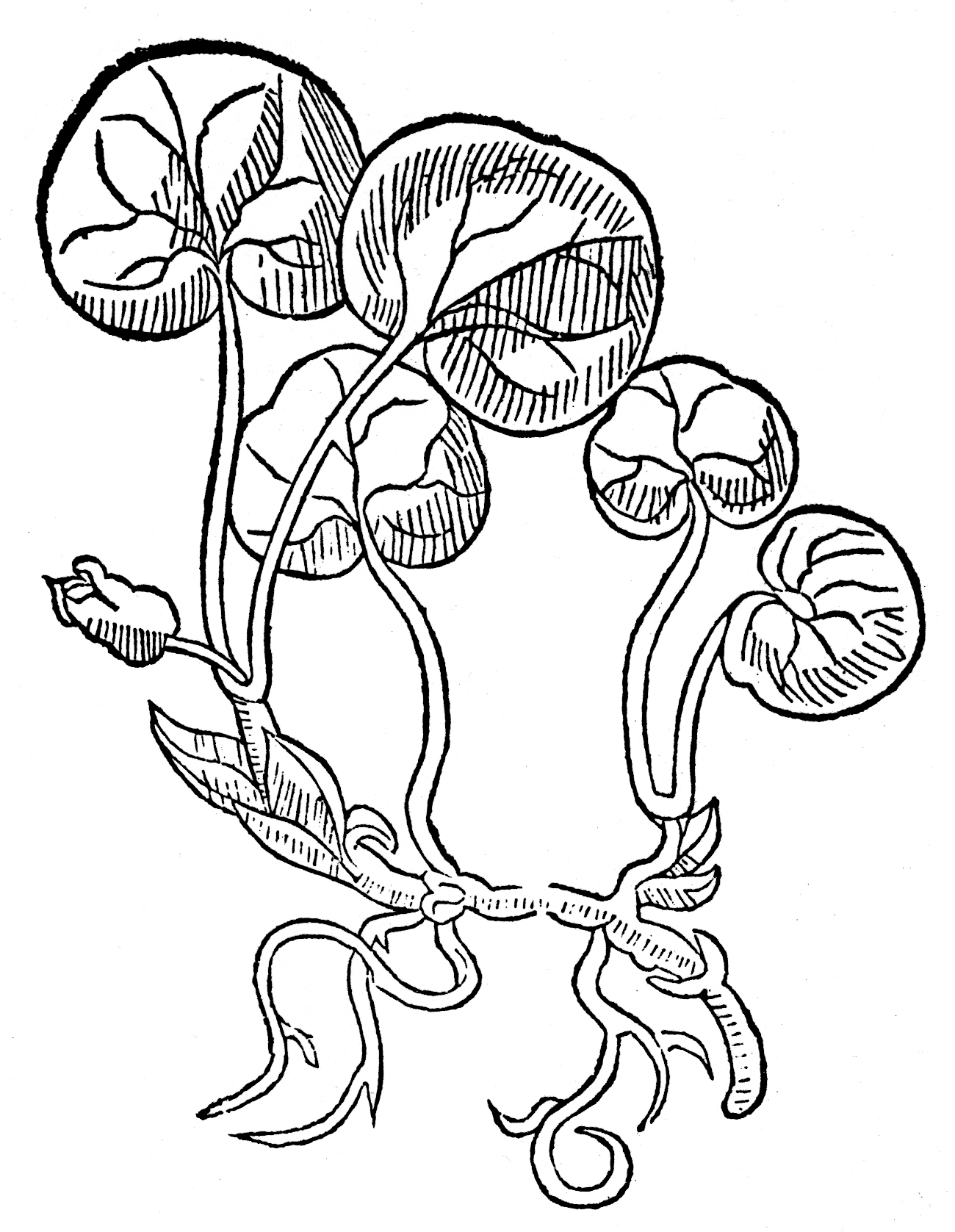
Chapter 19. Azarum – haselwortz

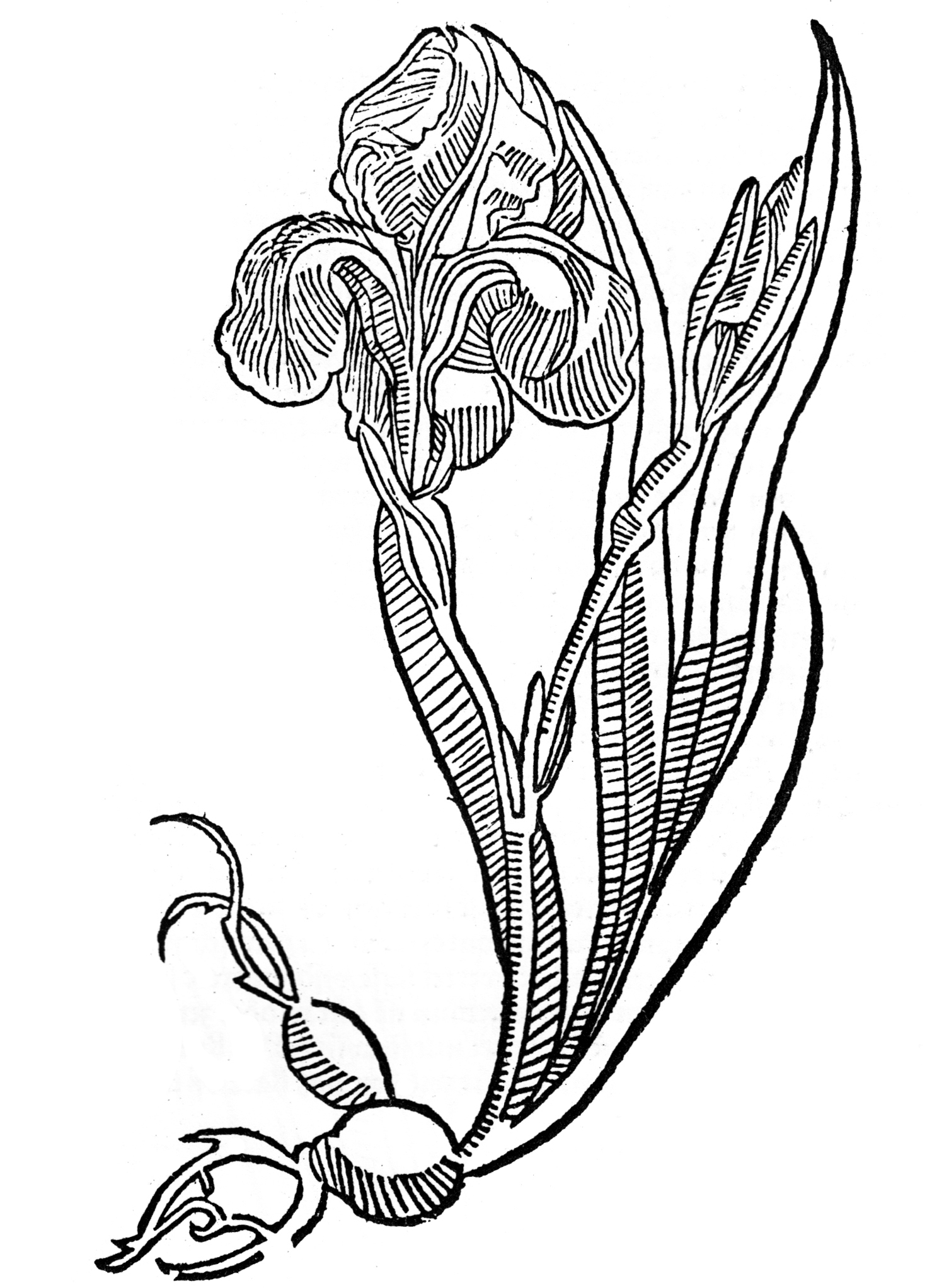
Chapter 20. Affodillus – goltwortz

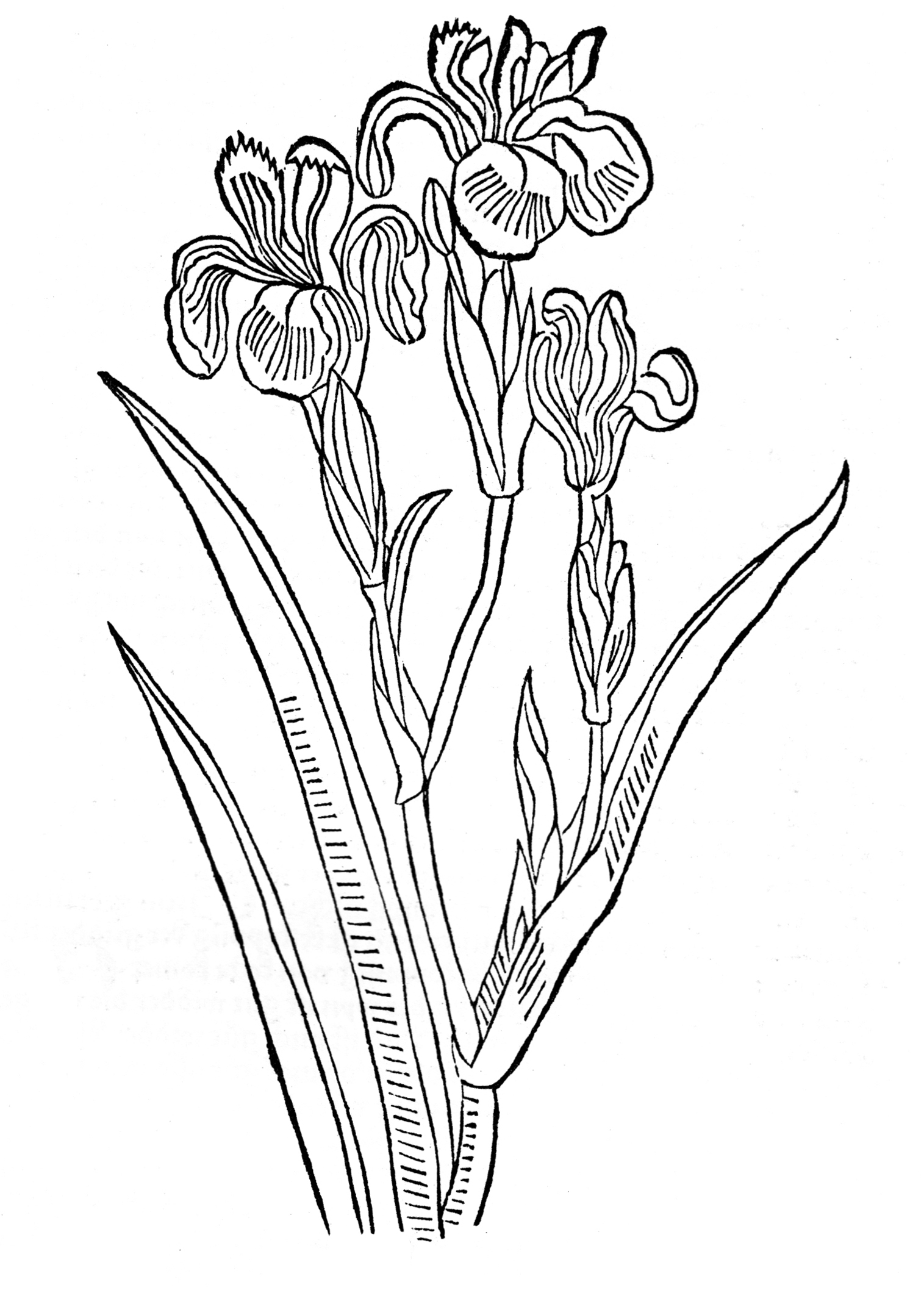
Chapter 21. Acorus – geel lilien

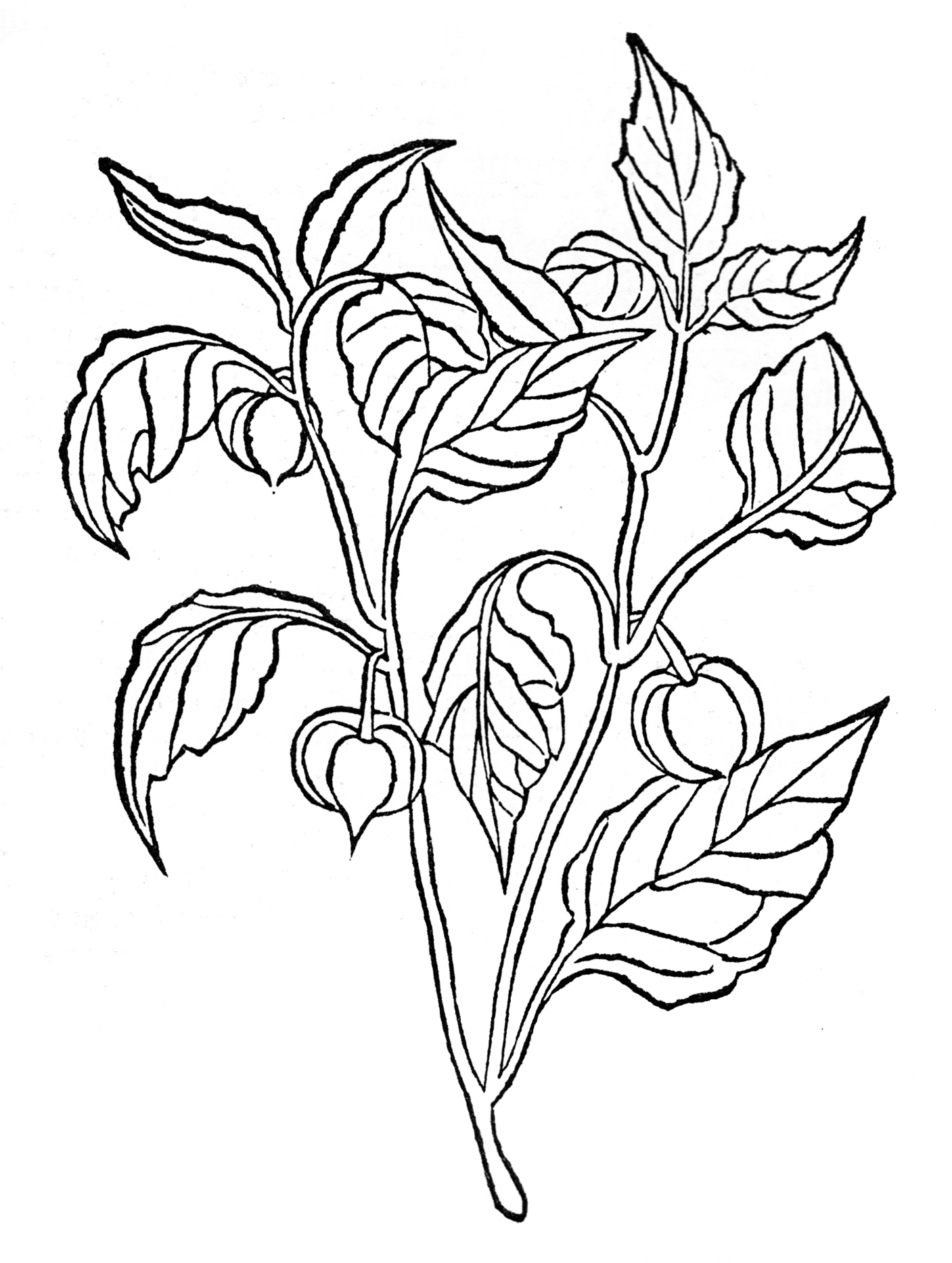
Chapter 24. Alkekengi – boberellen

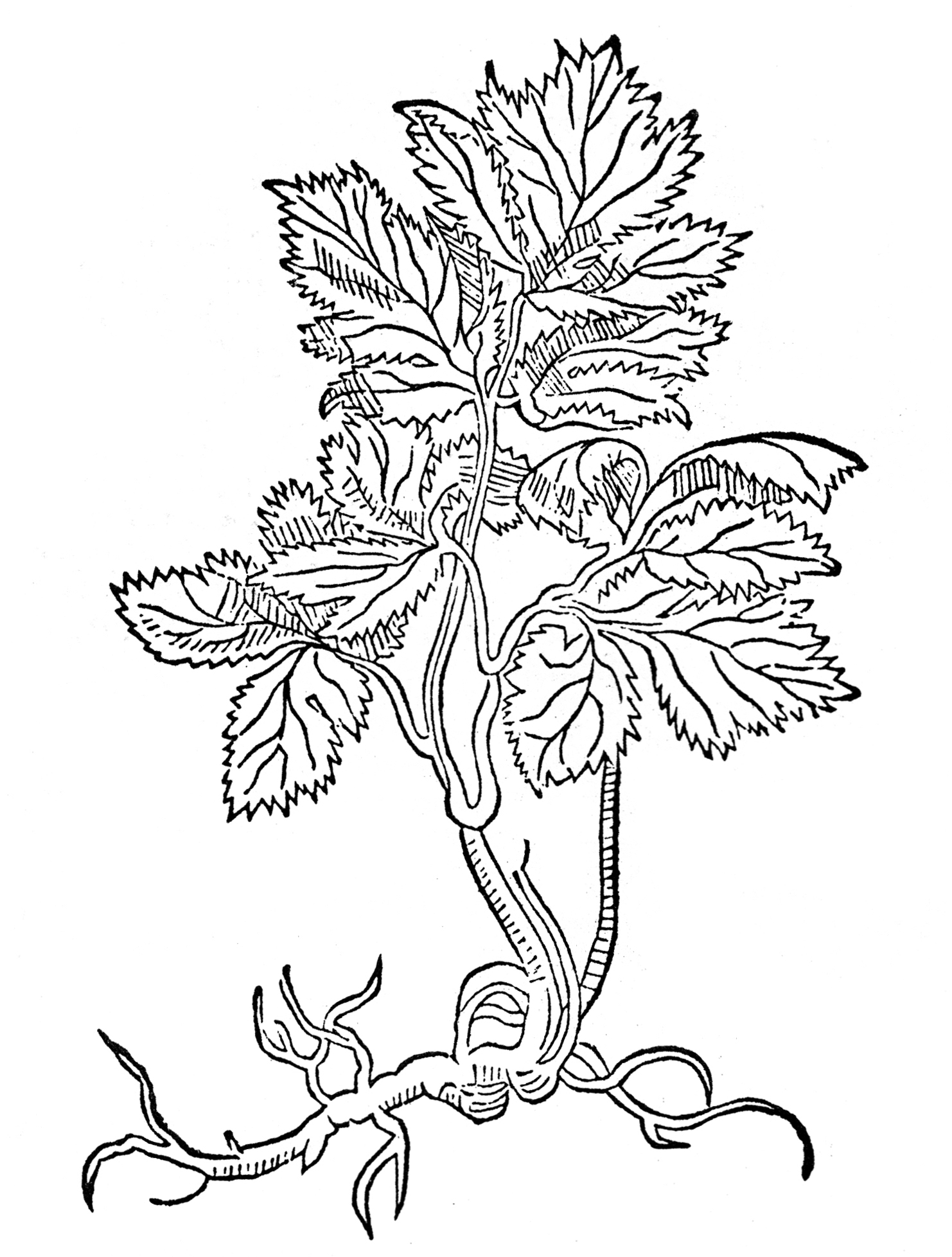
Chapter 25. Astrens vel Meu – meister wortz

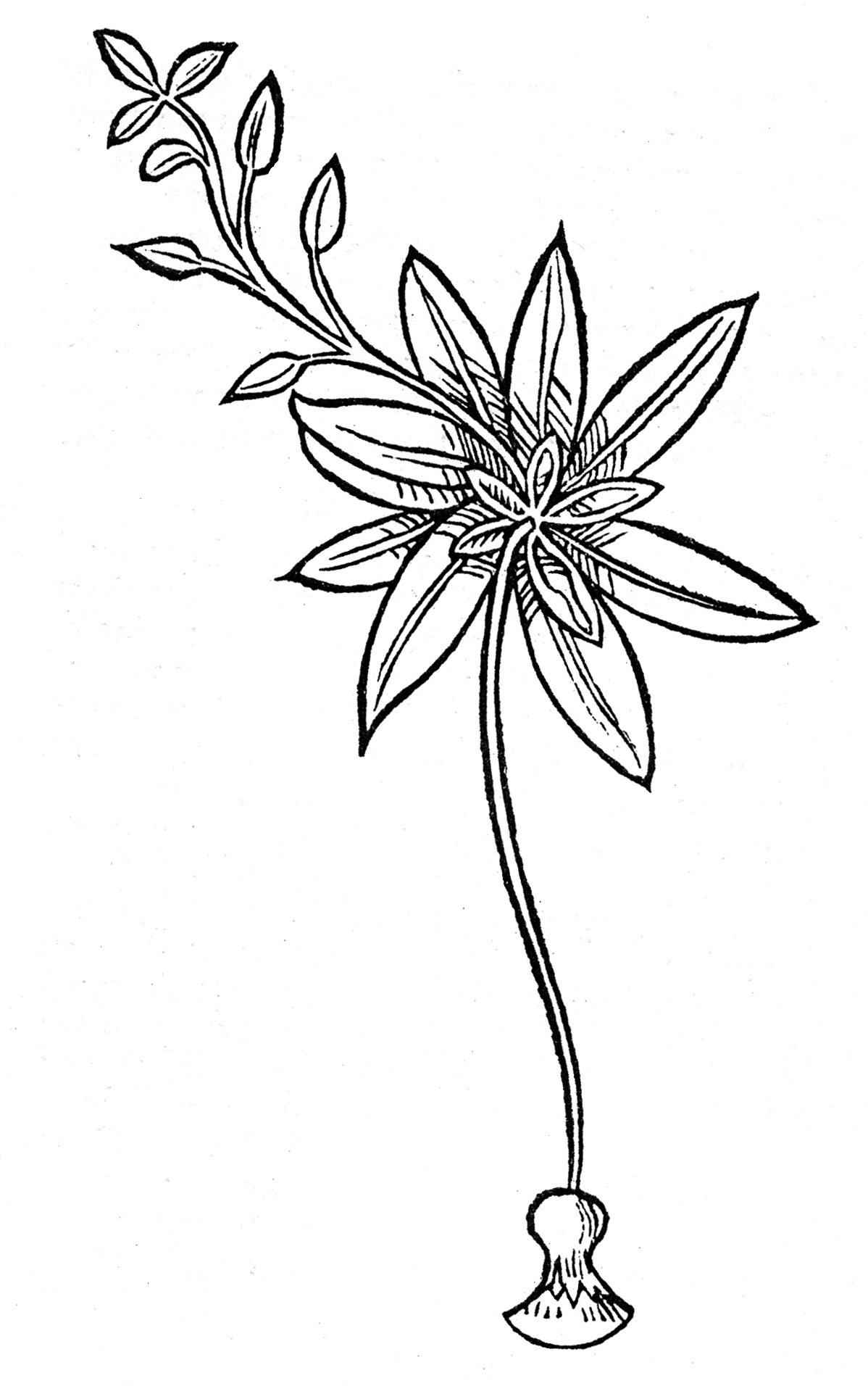
Chapter 28. Auricula muris sive anagallus – muß ore

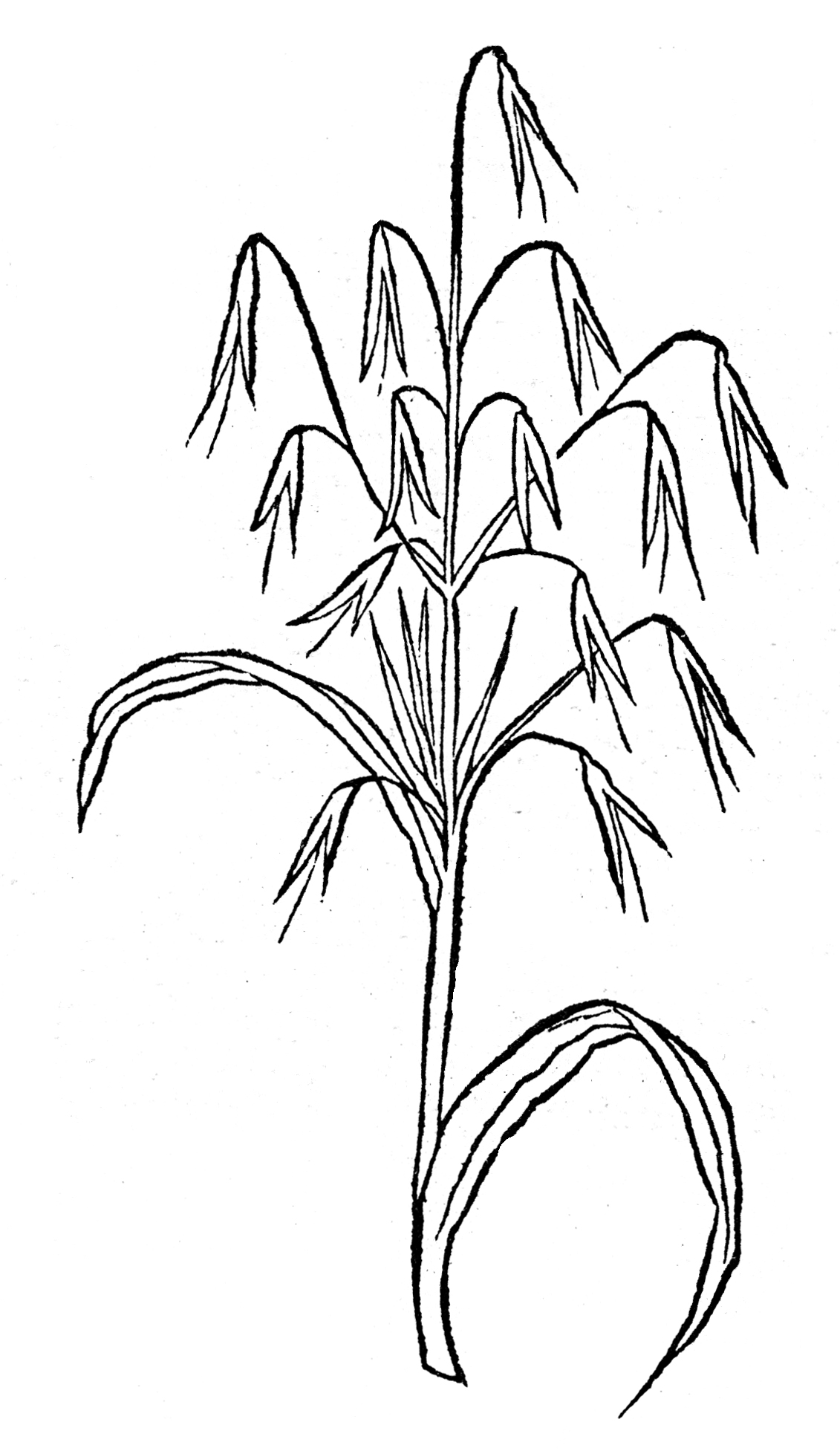
Chapter 29. Avena – habern

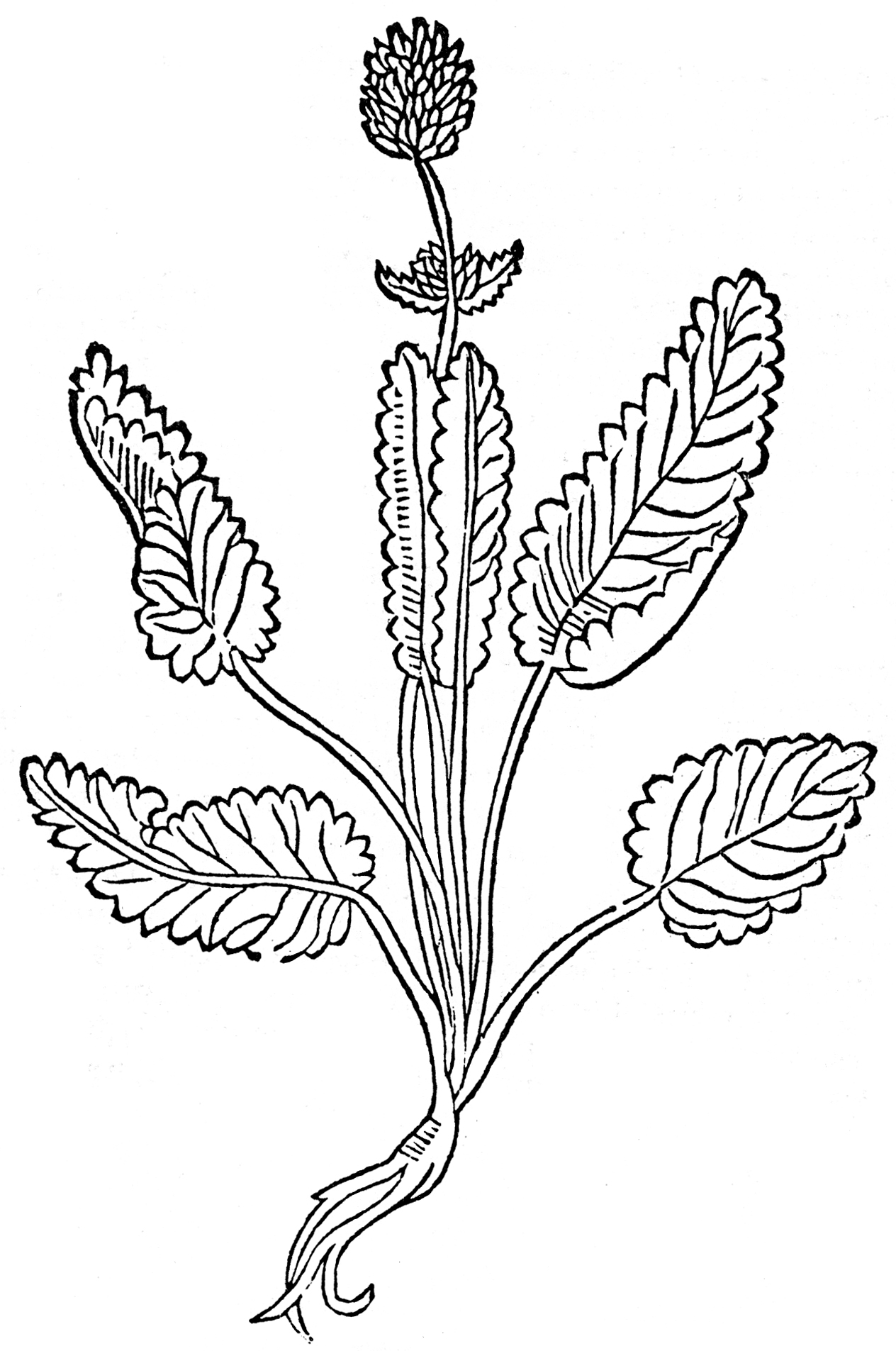
Chapter 53. Betonica – betonien

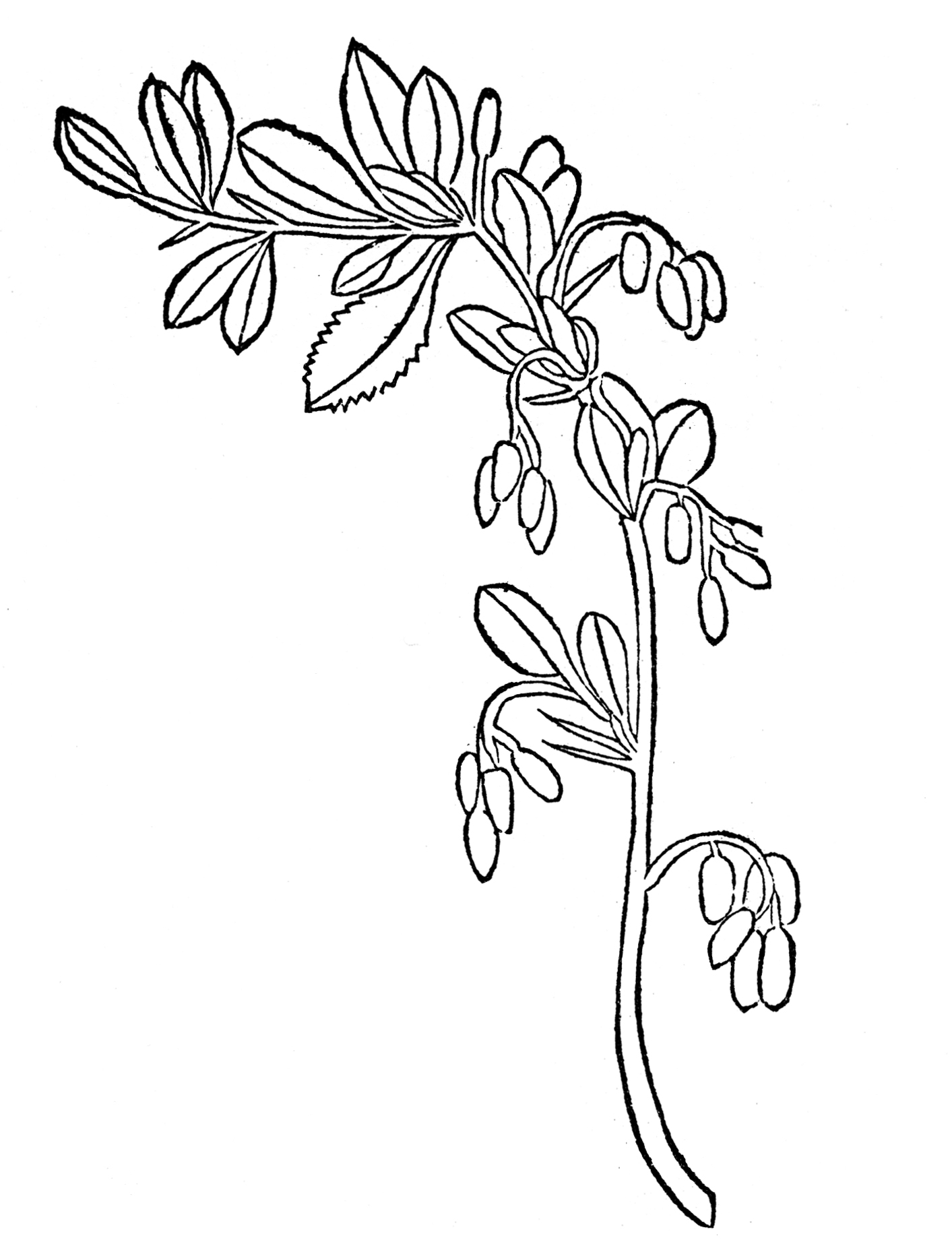
Chapter 55. Berberis – versyg

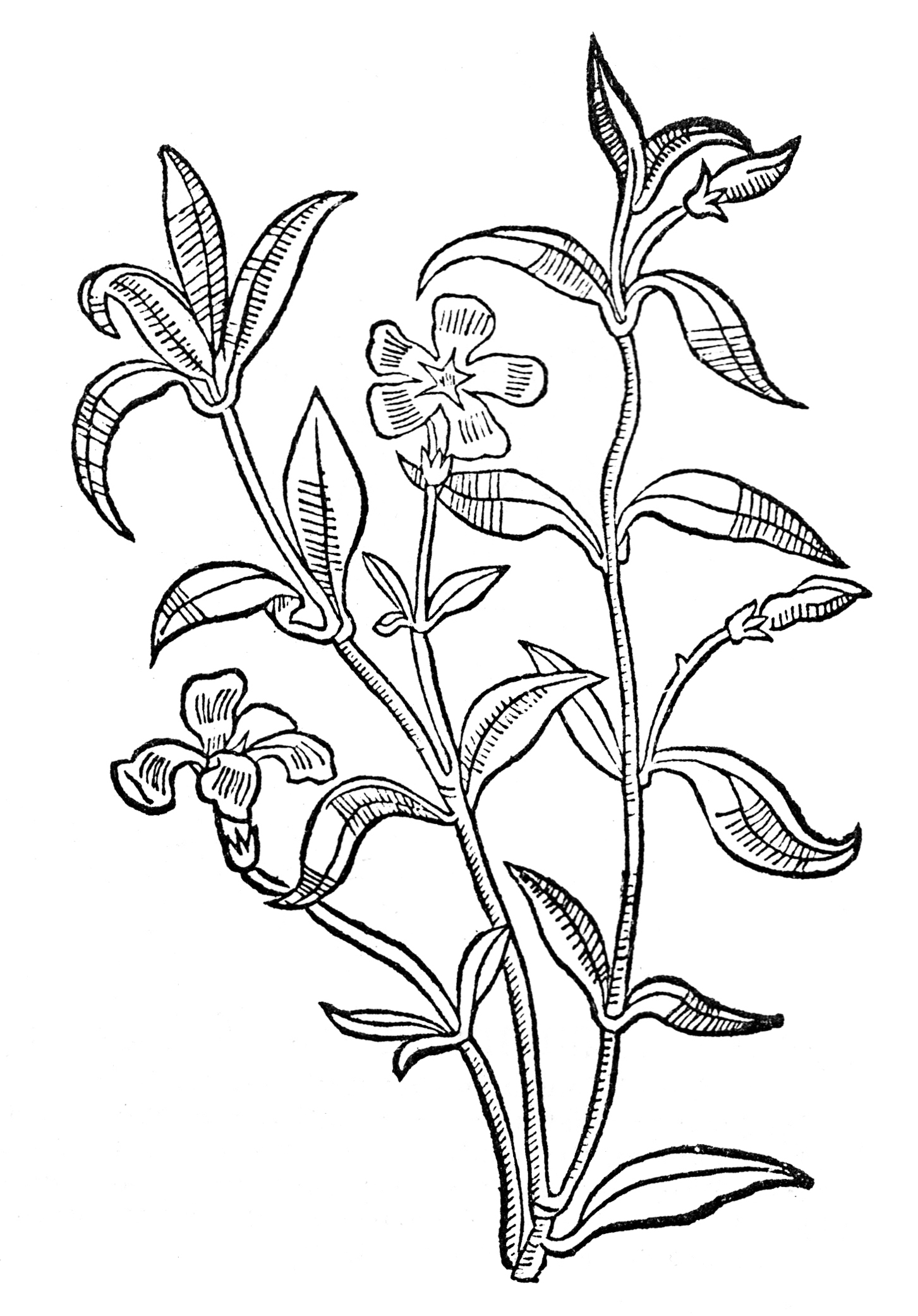
Chapter 79. Berwinca – syngrun

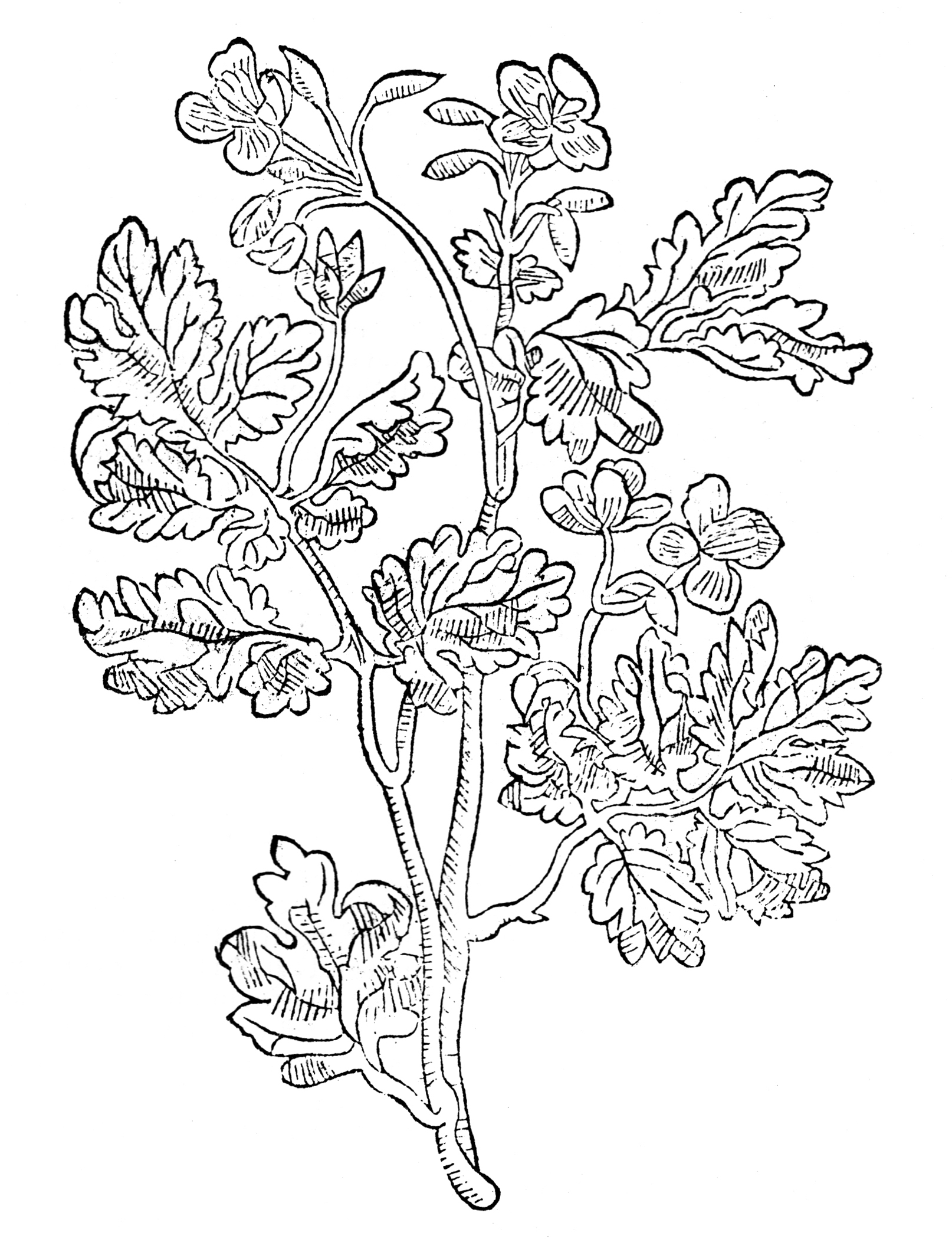
Chapter 85. Celidonia – schelwortz

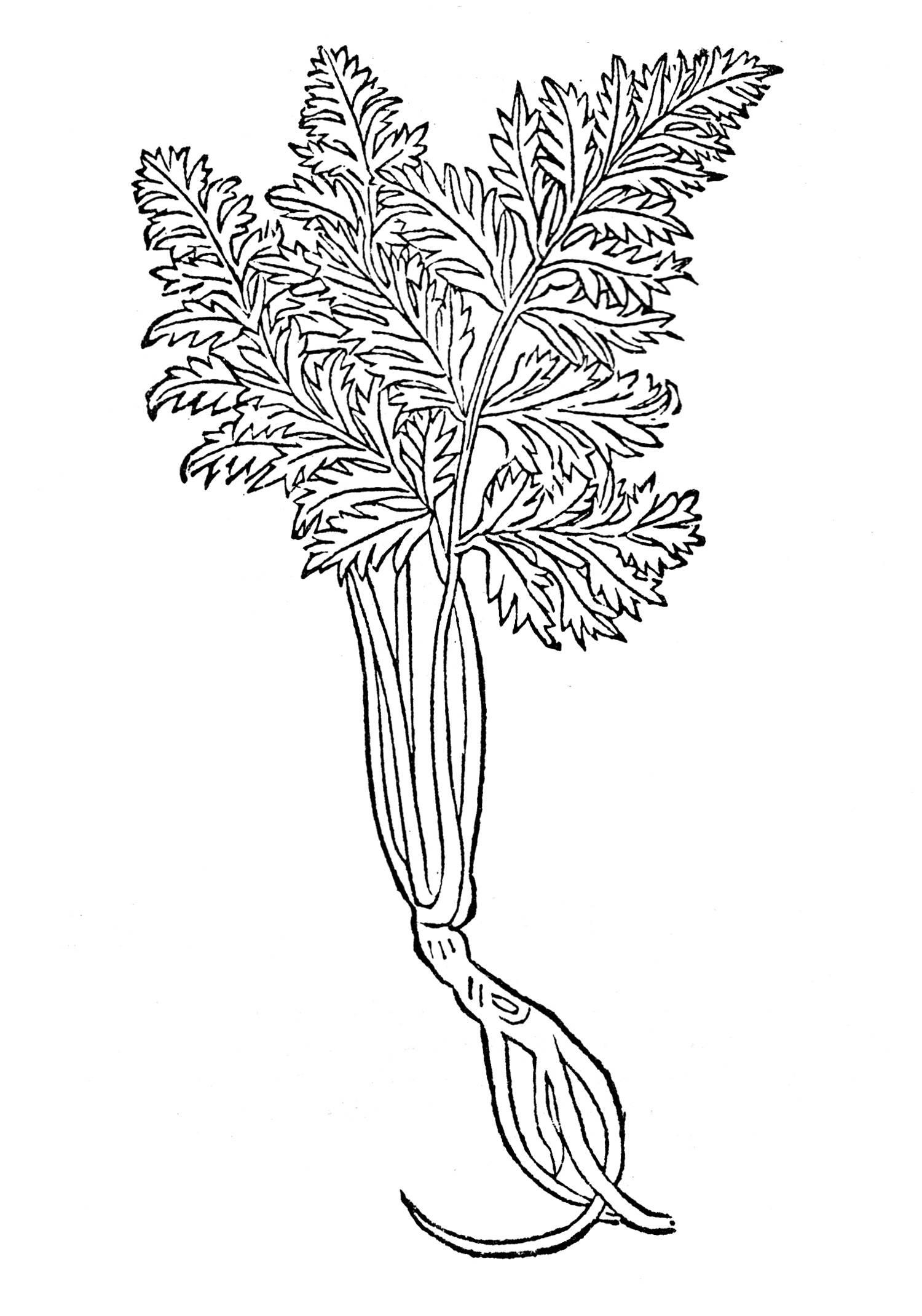
Chapter 87. Cicuta – wontzerling Cicuta virosa / Conium maculatum

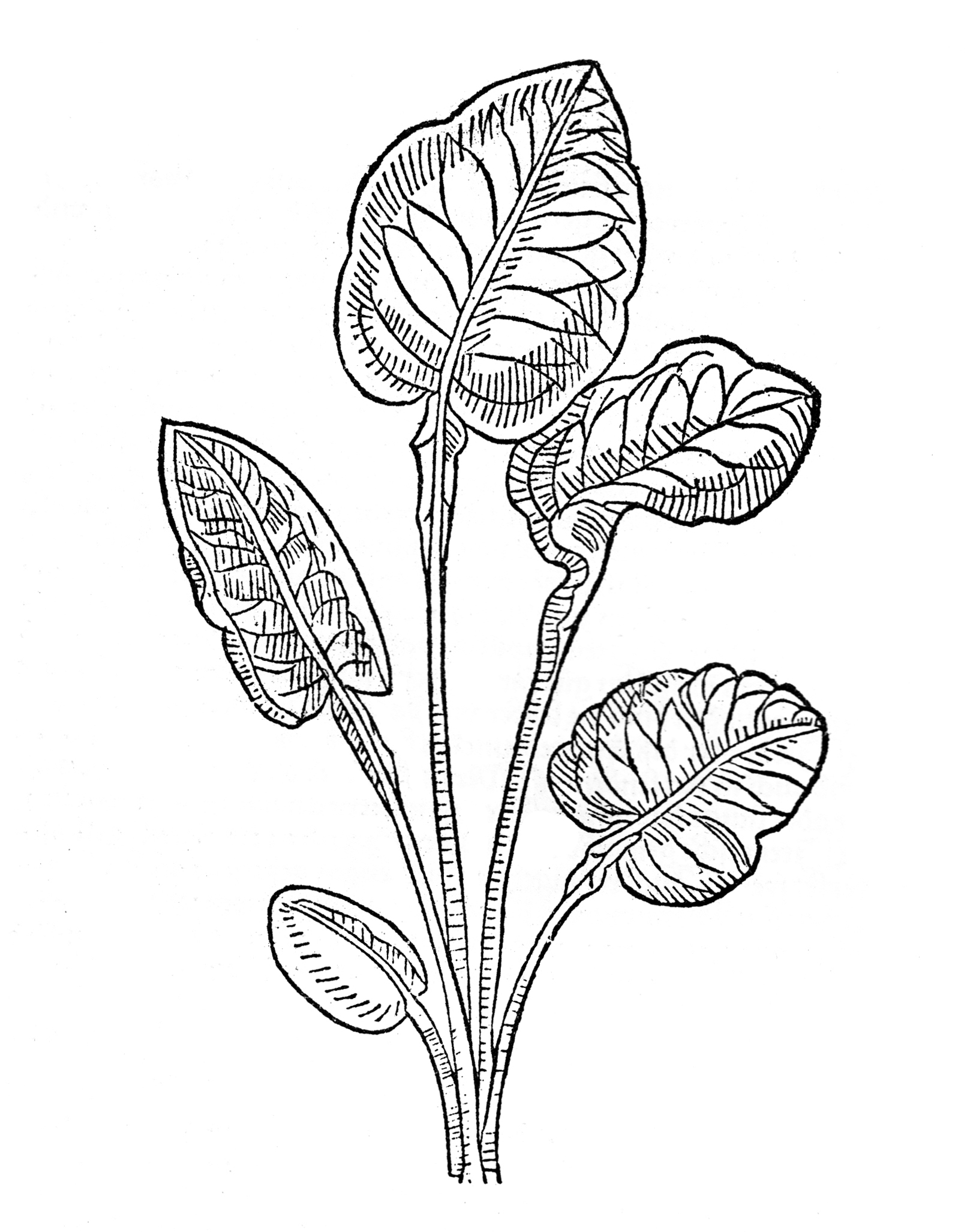
Chapter 89. Colubrina – naterwortz

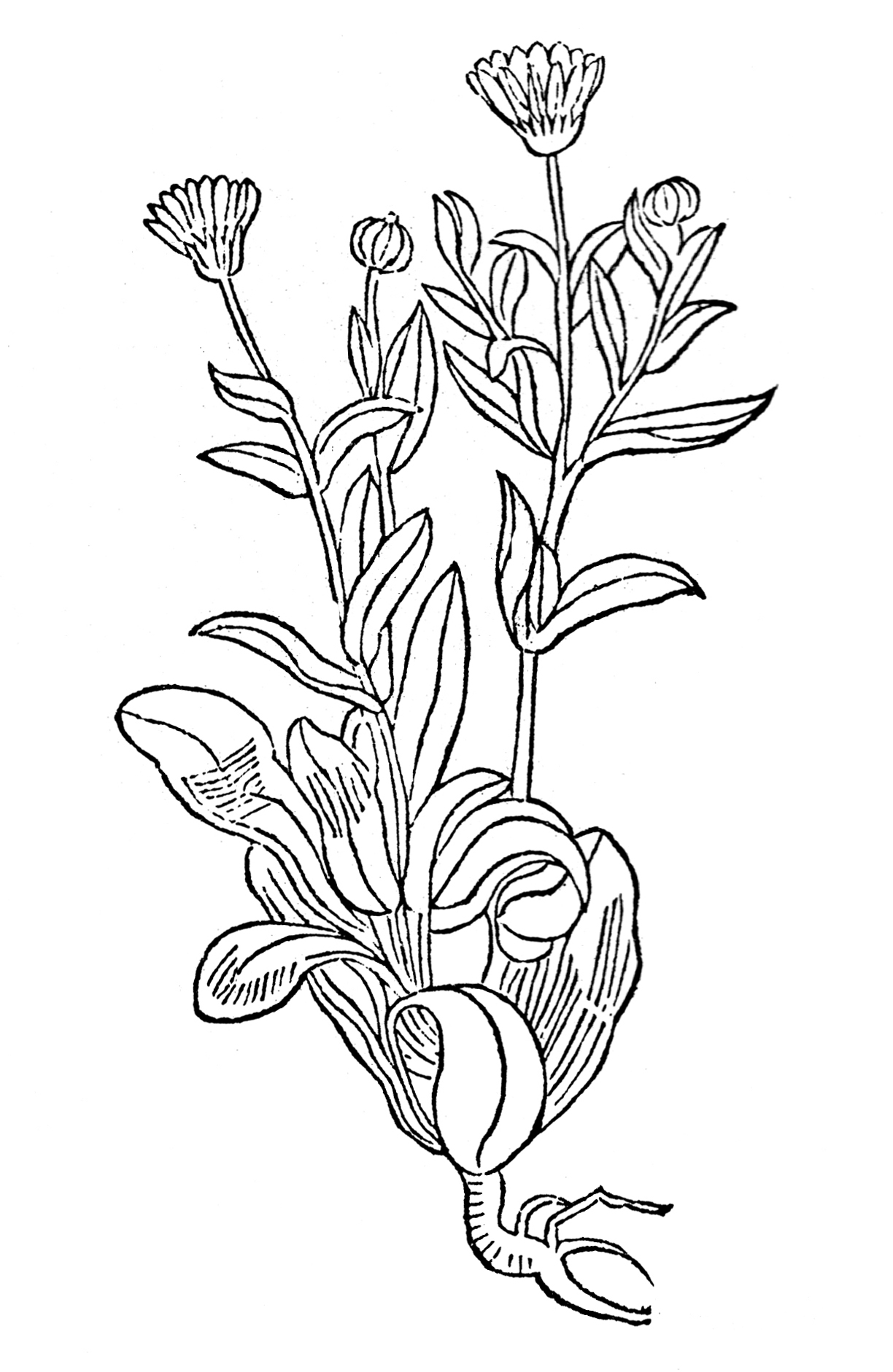
Chapter 98. Caput monachi – ryngel blomen

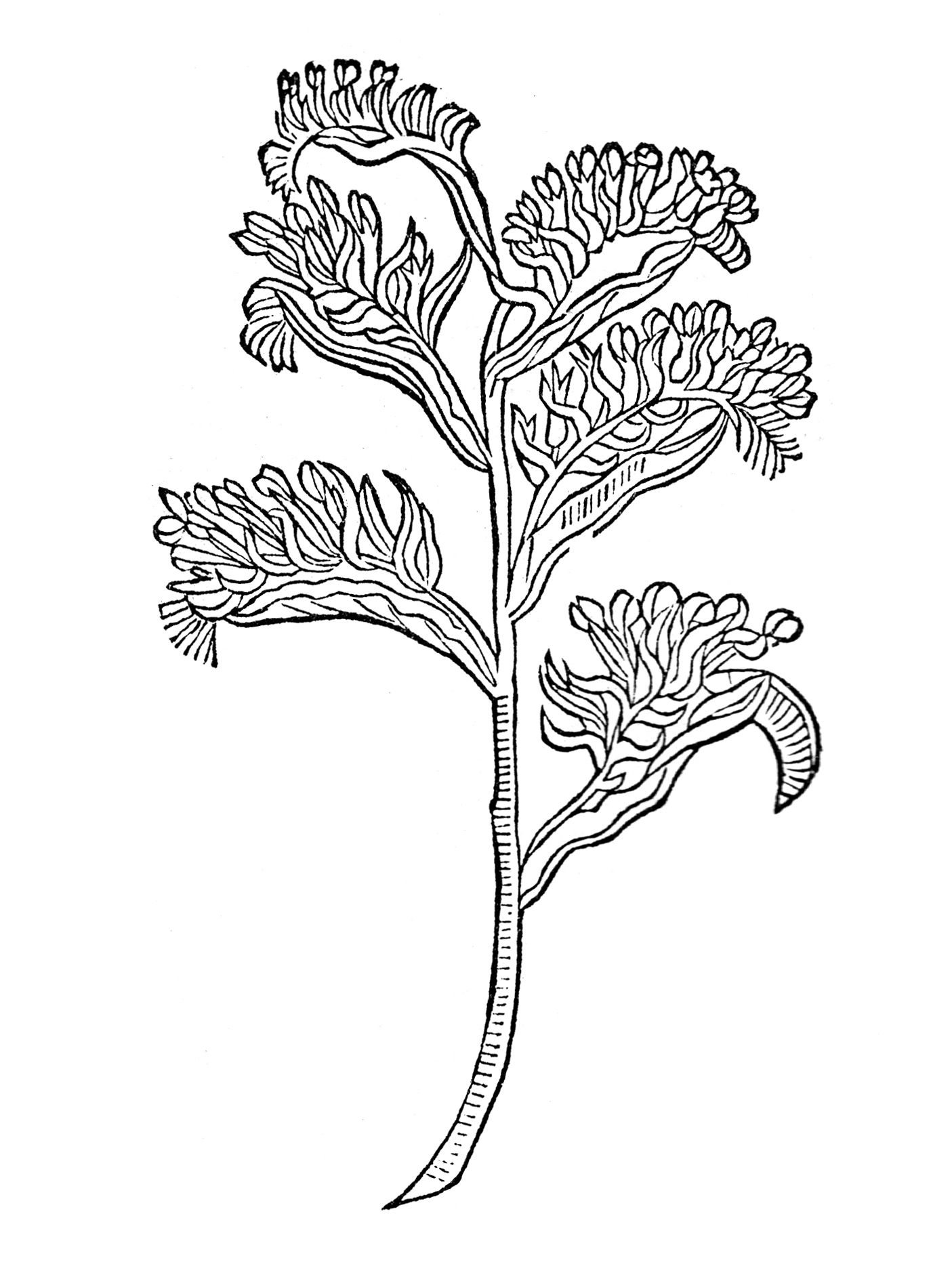
Chapter 99. Cinoglossa – hundesczung

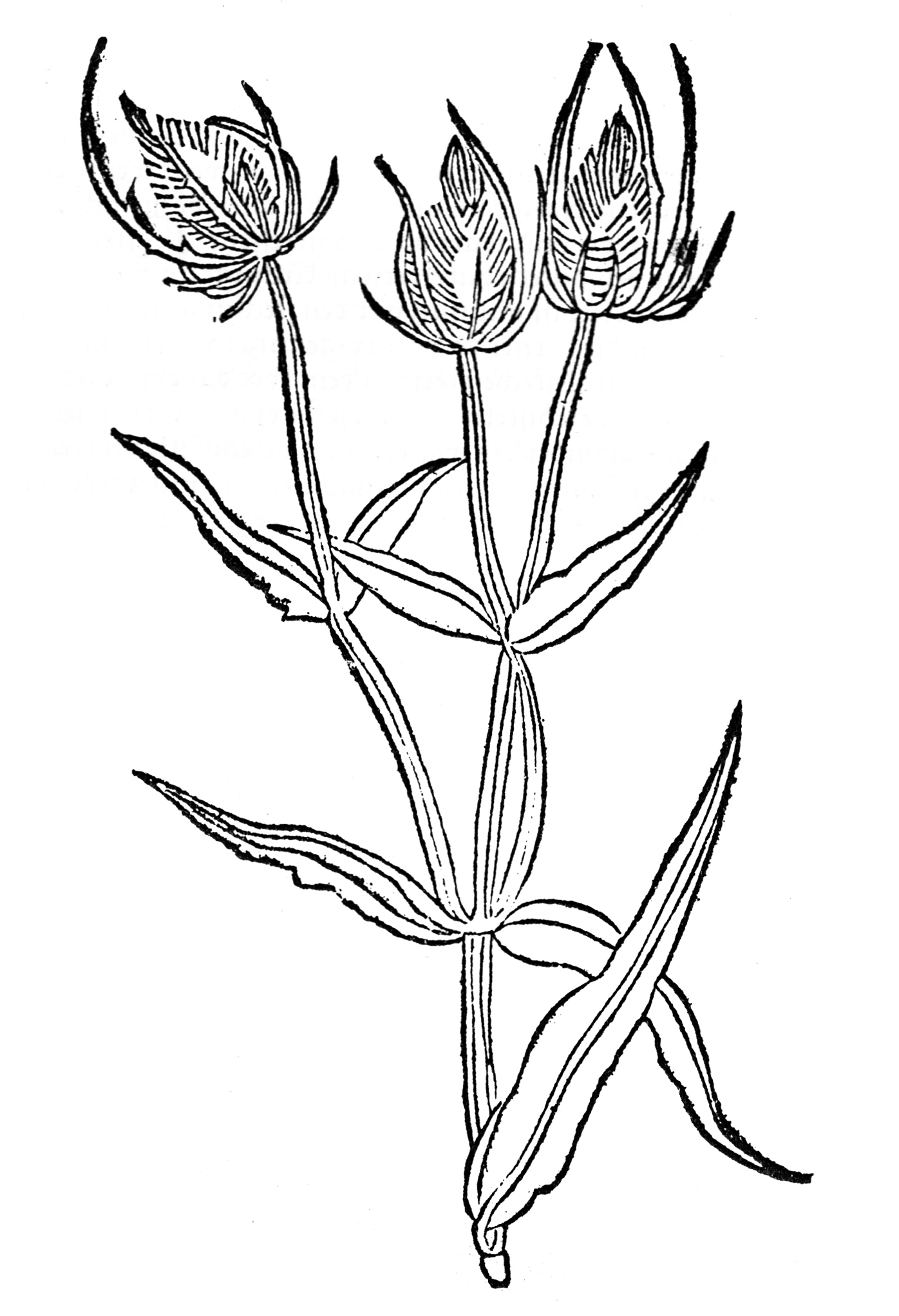
Chapter 101. Cardo – disteln Dipsacus fullonum / Dipsacus sylvestris

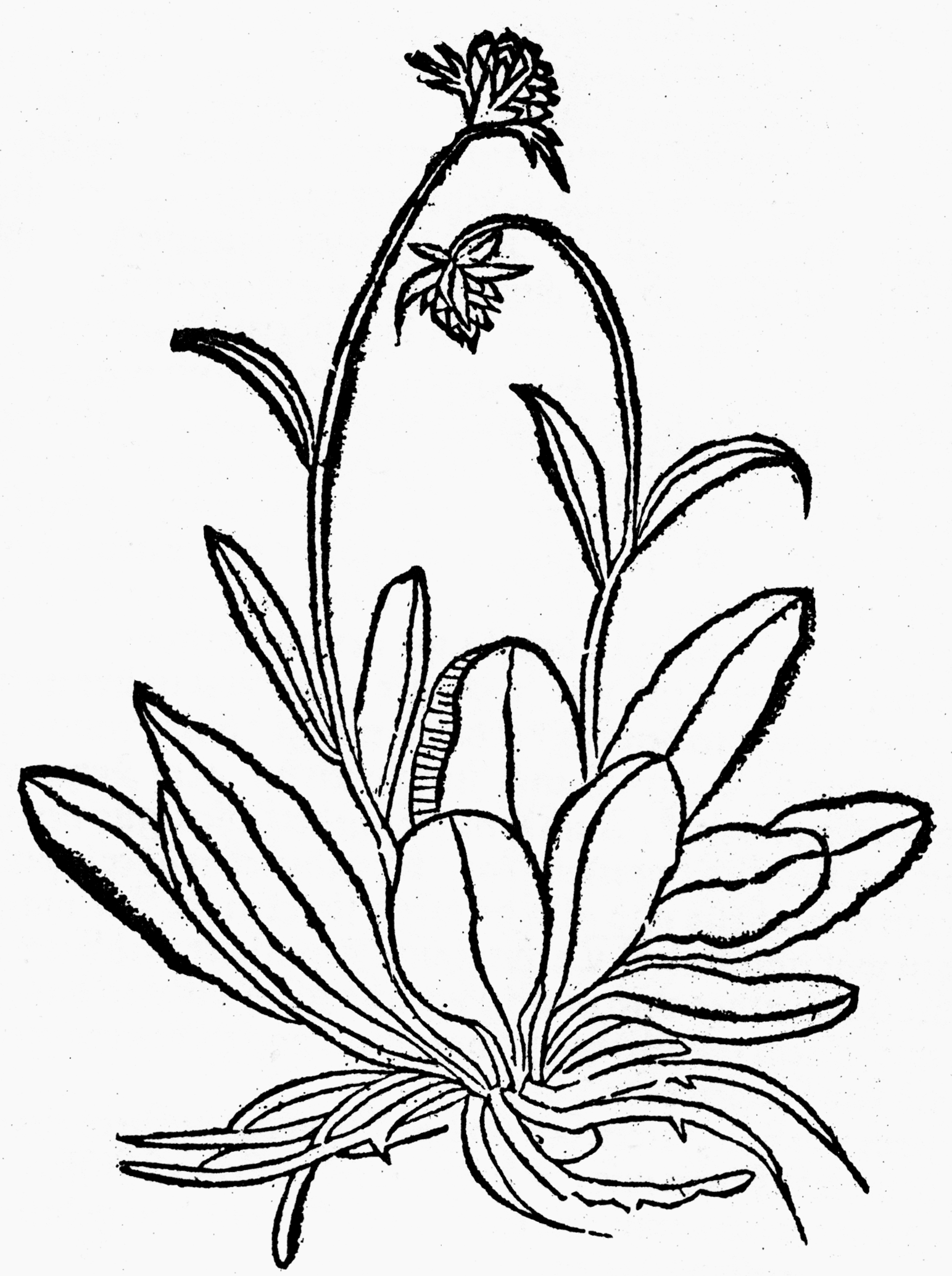
Chapter 119. Succisa pratensis. Incorrectly assigned to chapter 119 Camphora

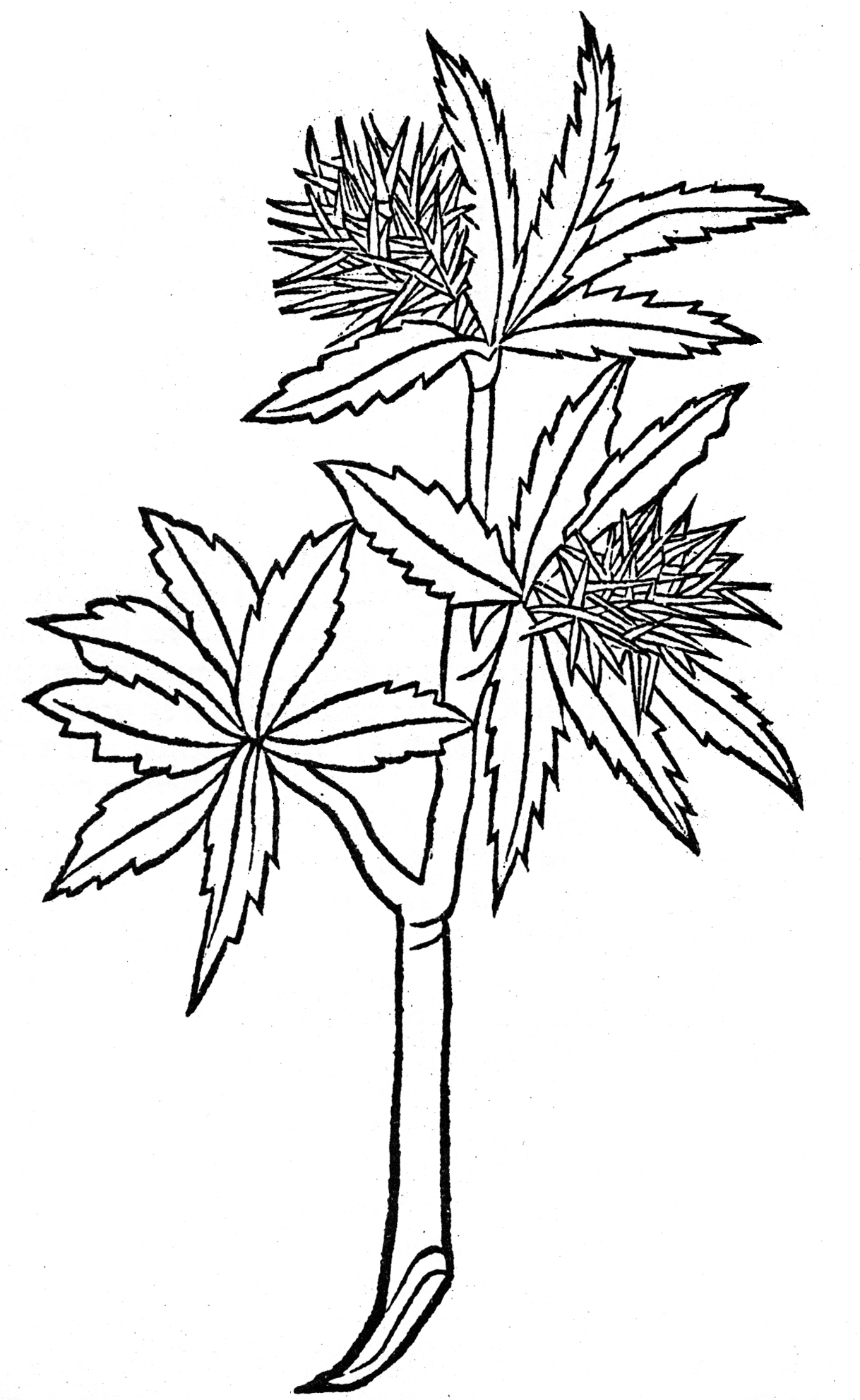
Chapter 122. Castaneus – kestenbaum

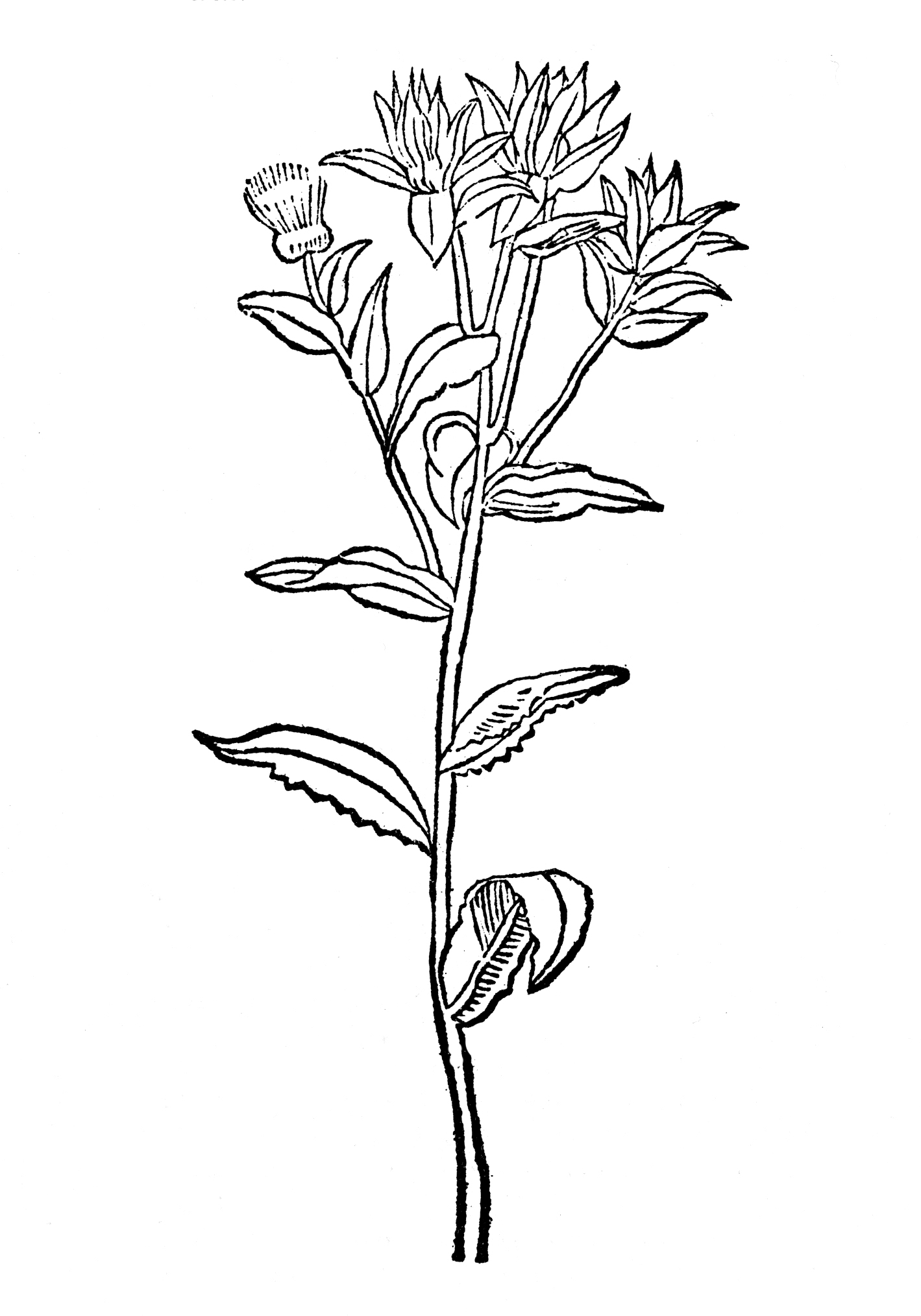
Chapter 133. Cartamus – wilder saffran

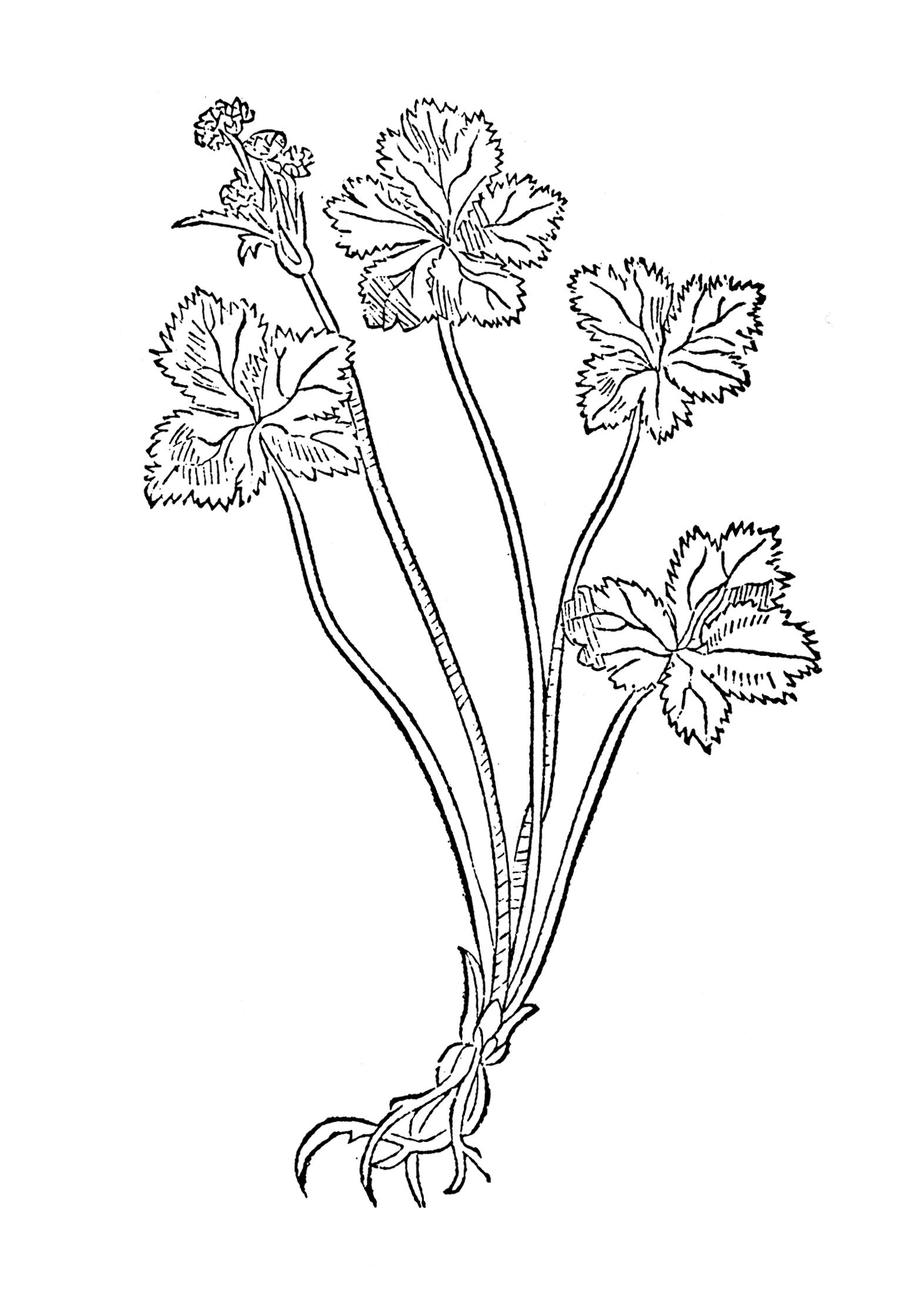
Chapter 148. Diapensia – sanickel

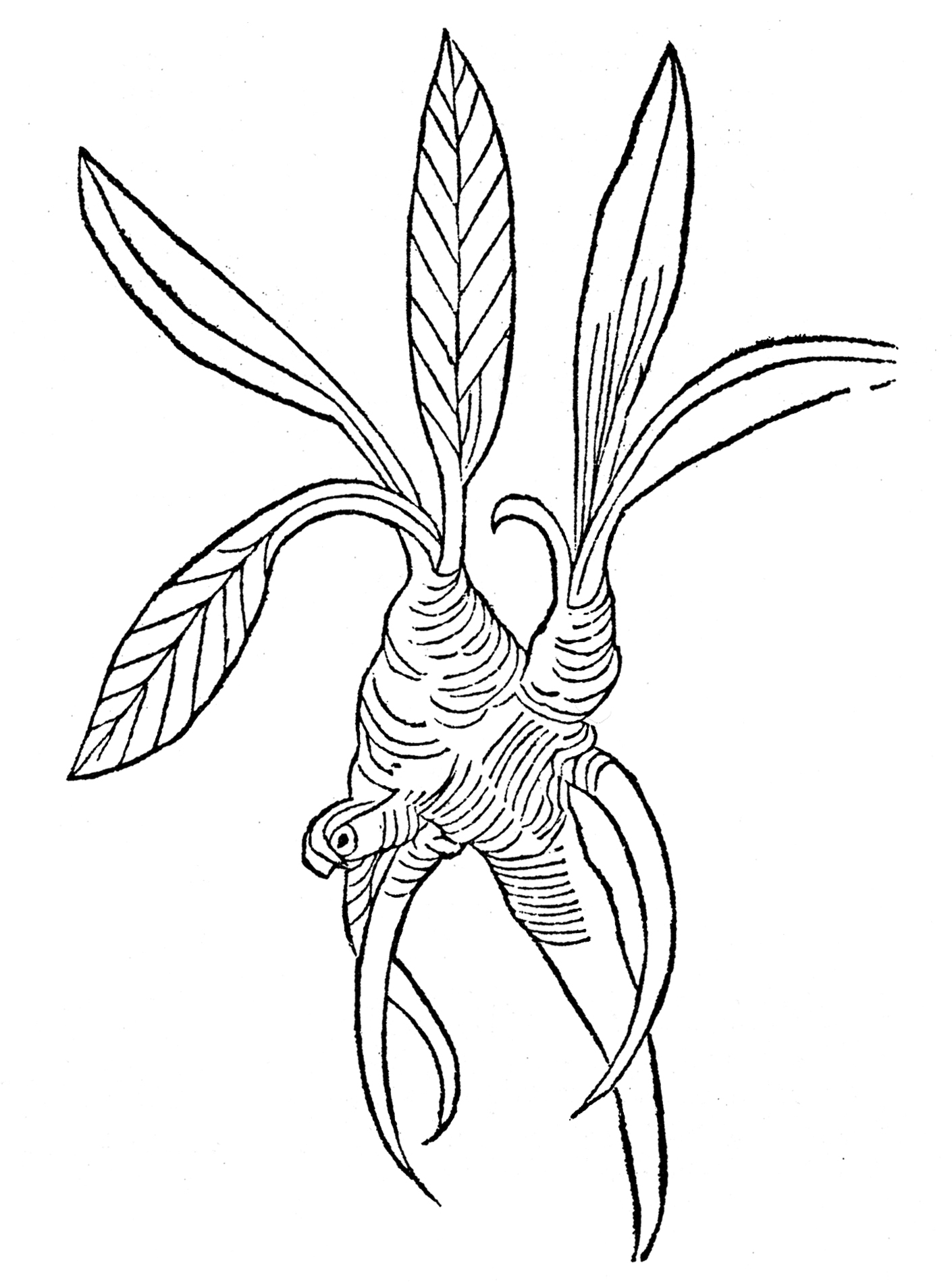
Chapter 154. Enula campana – alantwortz

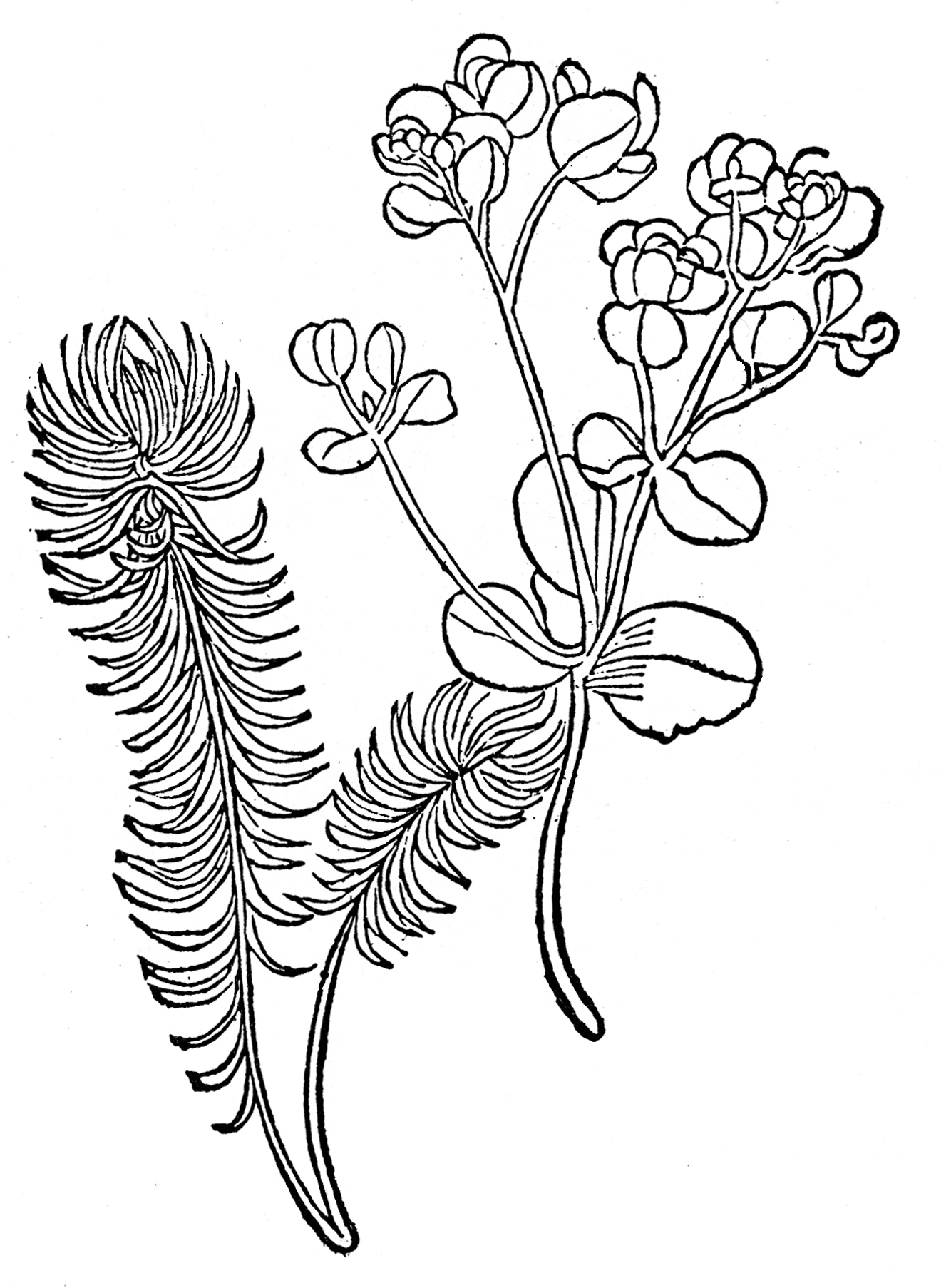
Chapter 158. Esula – Wolffsmilch

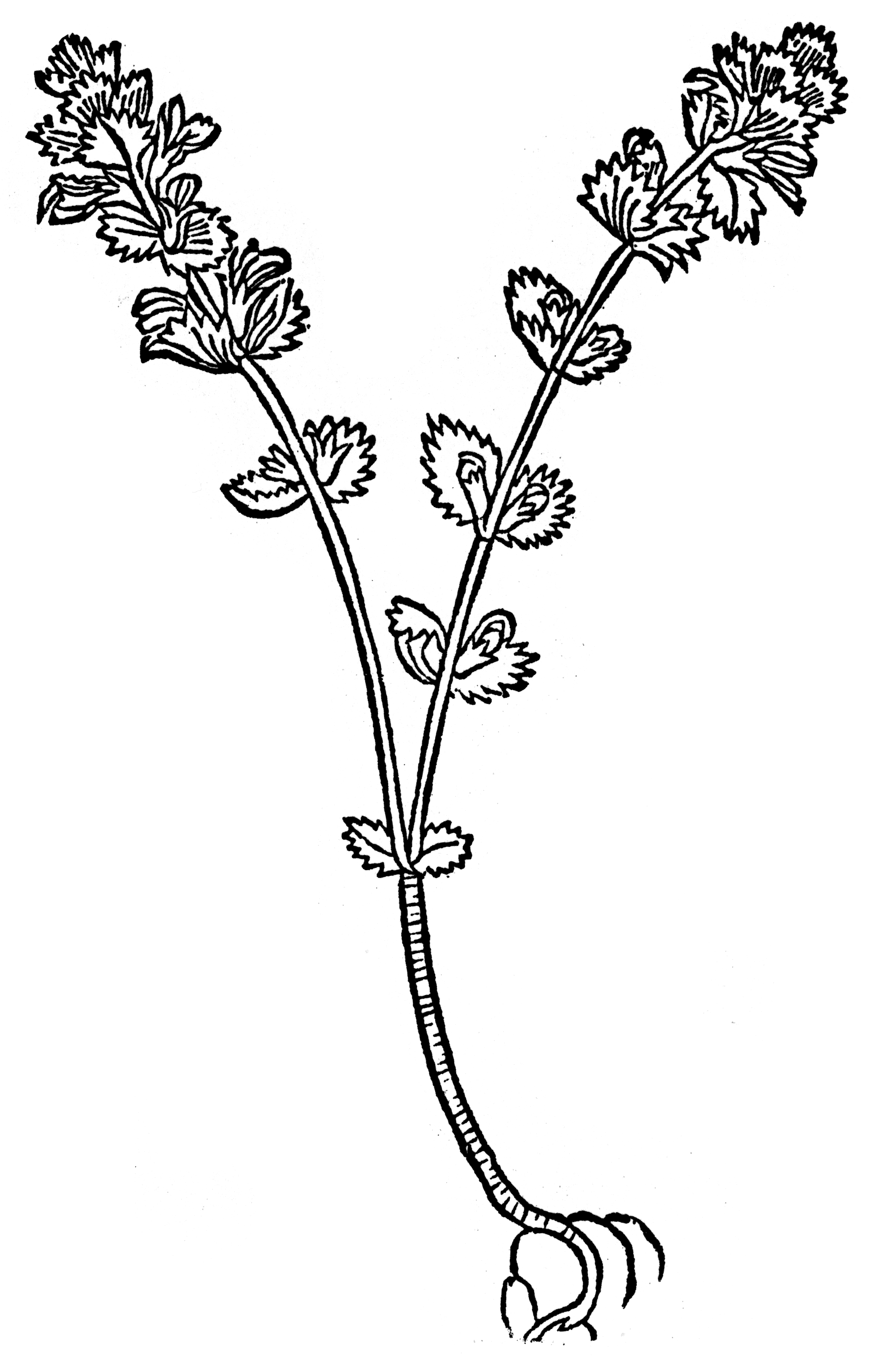
Chapter 160. Eufragia – augentrost

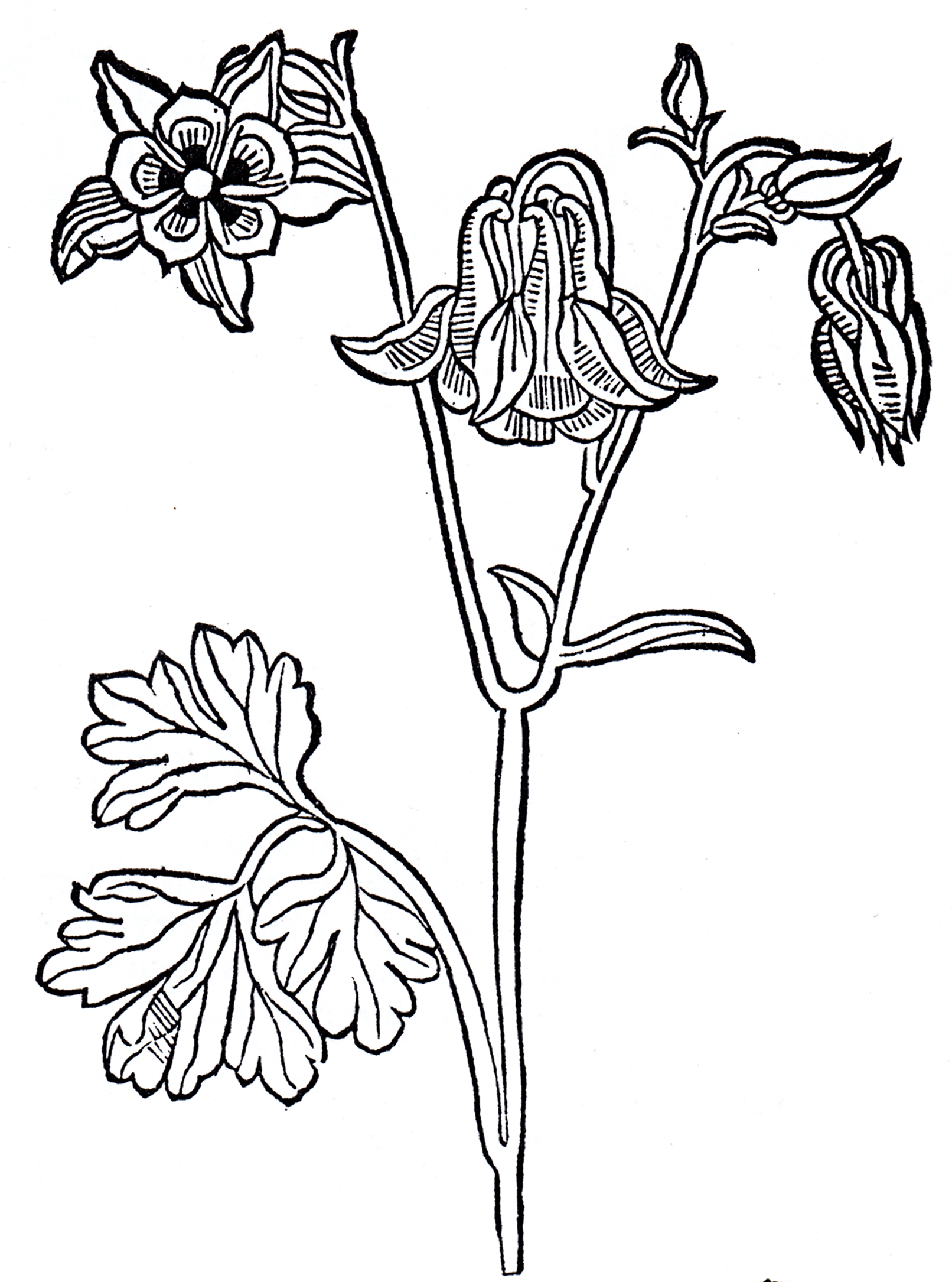
Chapter 162. Egilops vel egilopa – ackeley

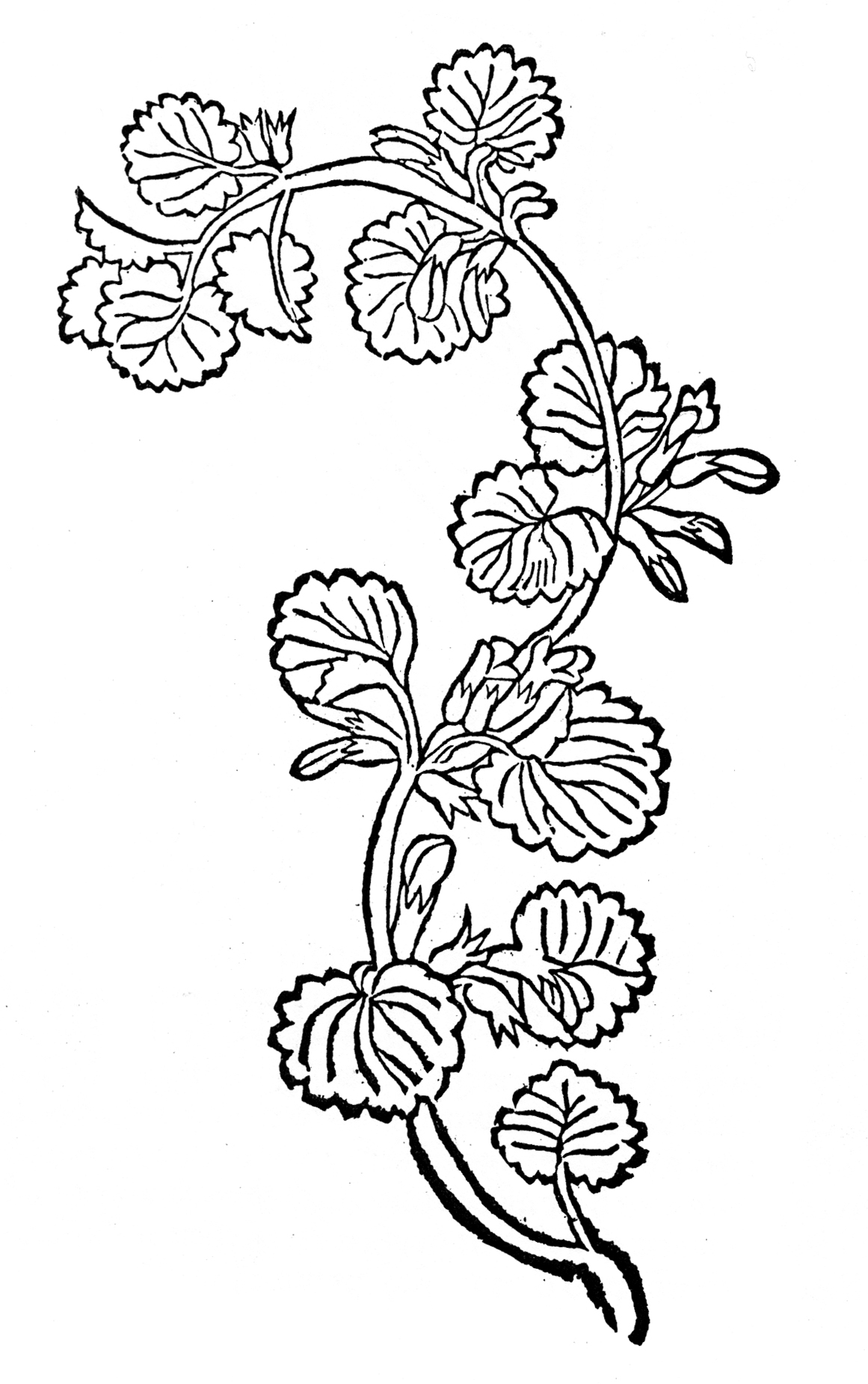
Chapter 164. Edera terrestis – gundelrebe

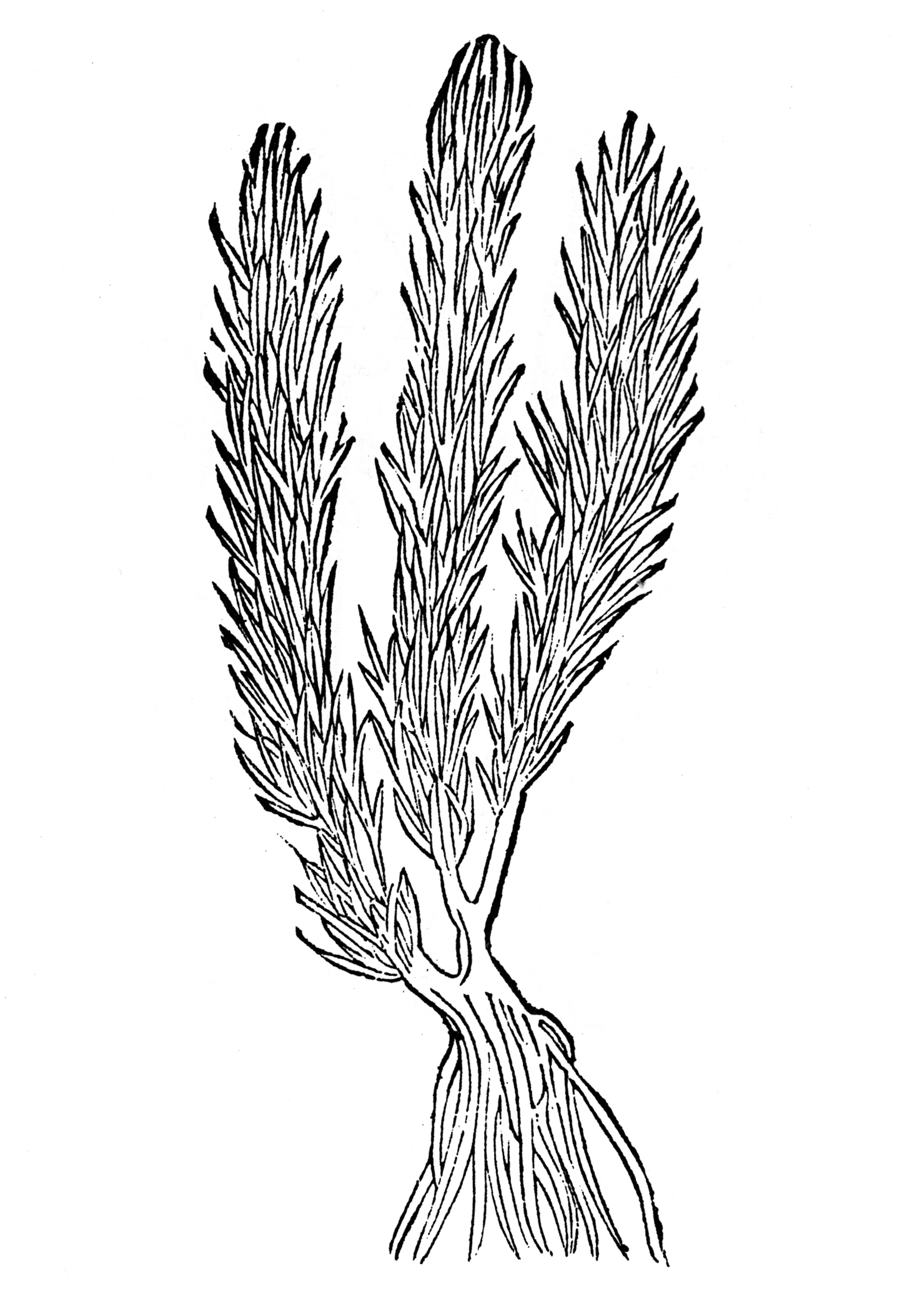
Chapter 166. Elleborus niger – swartz nyeszwortz

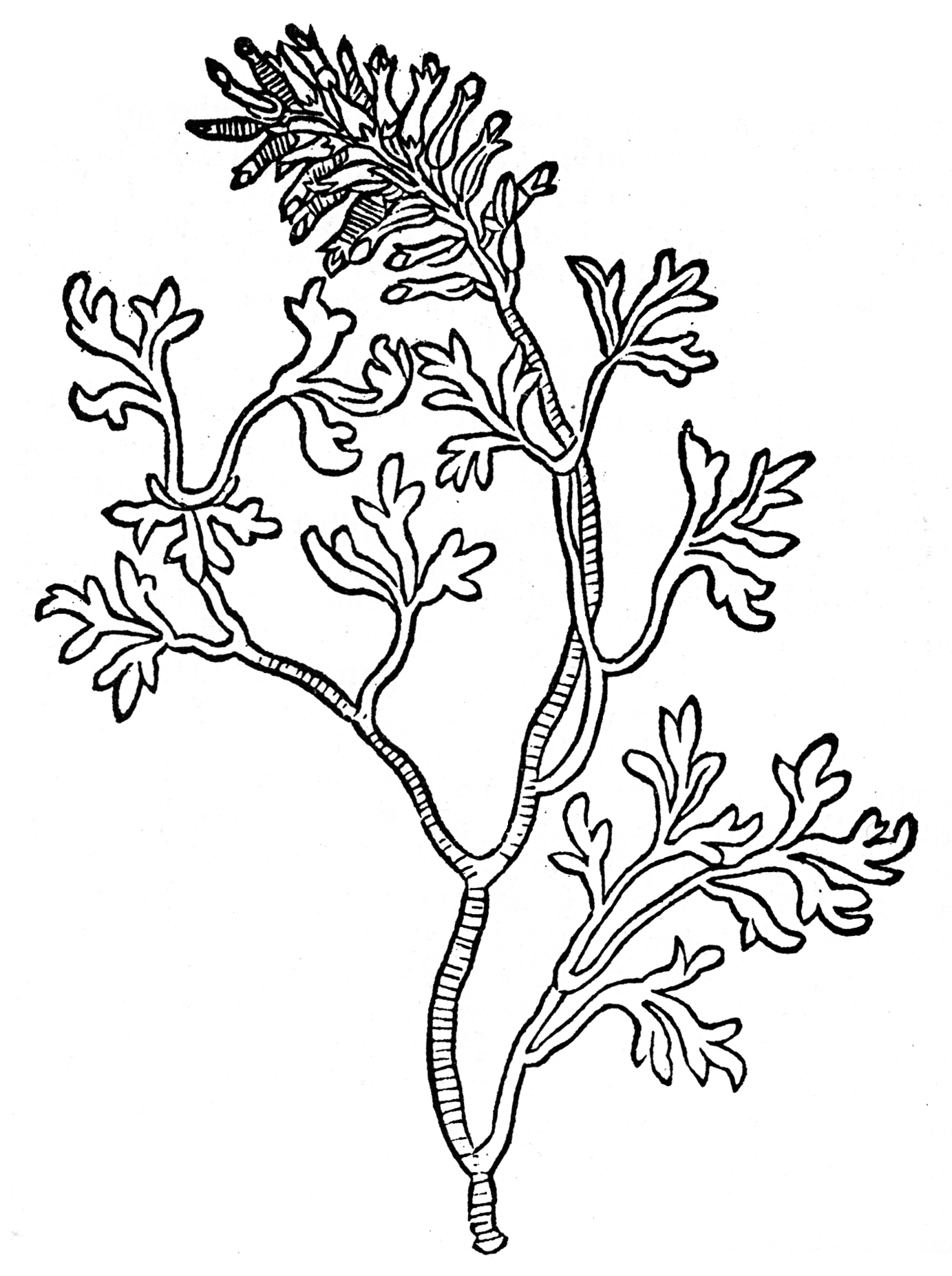
Chapter 176. Fumus terre – ertrauch oder katzen kerbeln

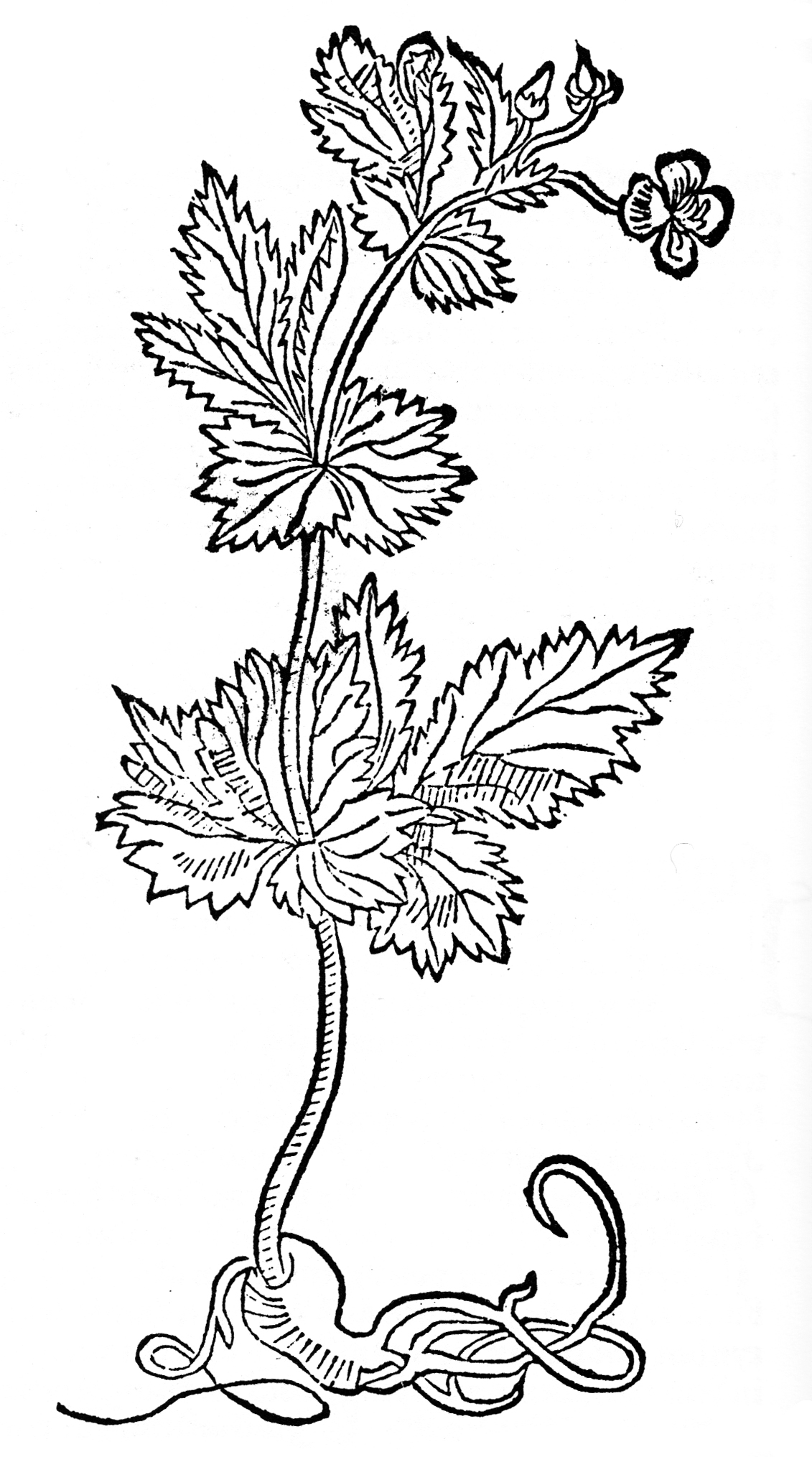
Chapter 179. Filla – benedictenwortz

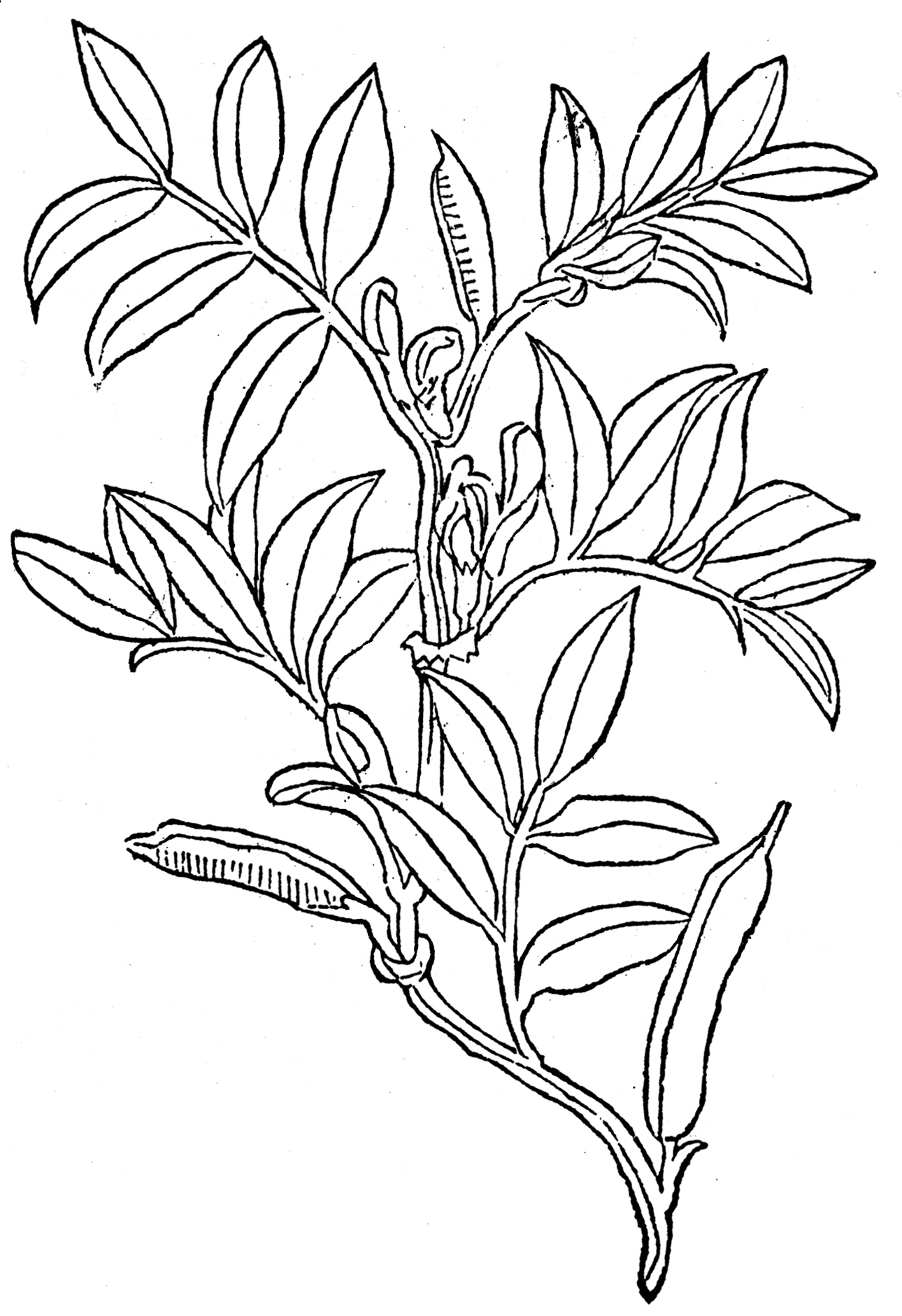
Chapter 180. Faba – bonen

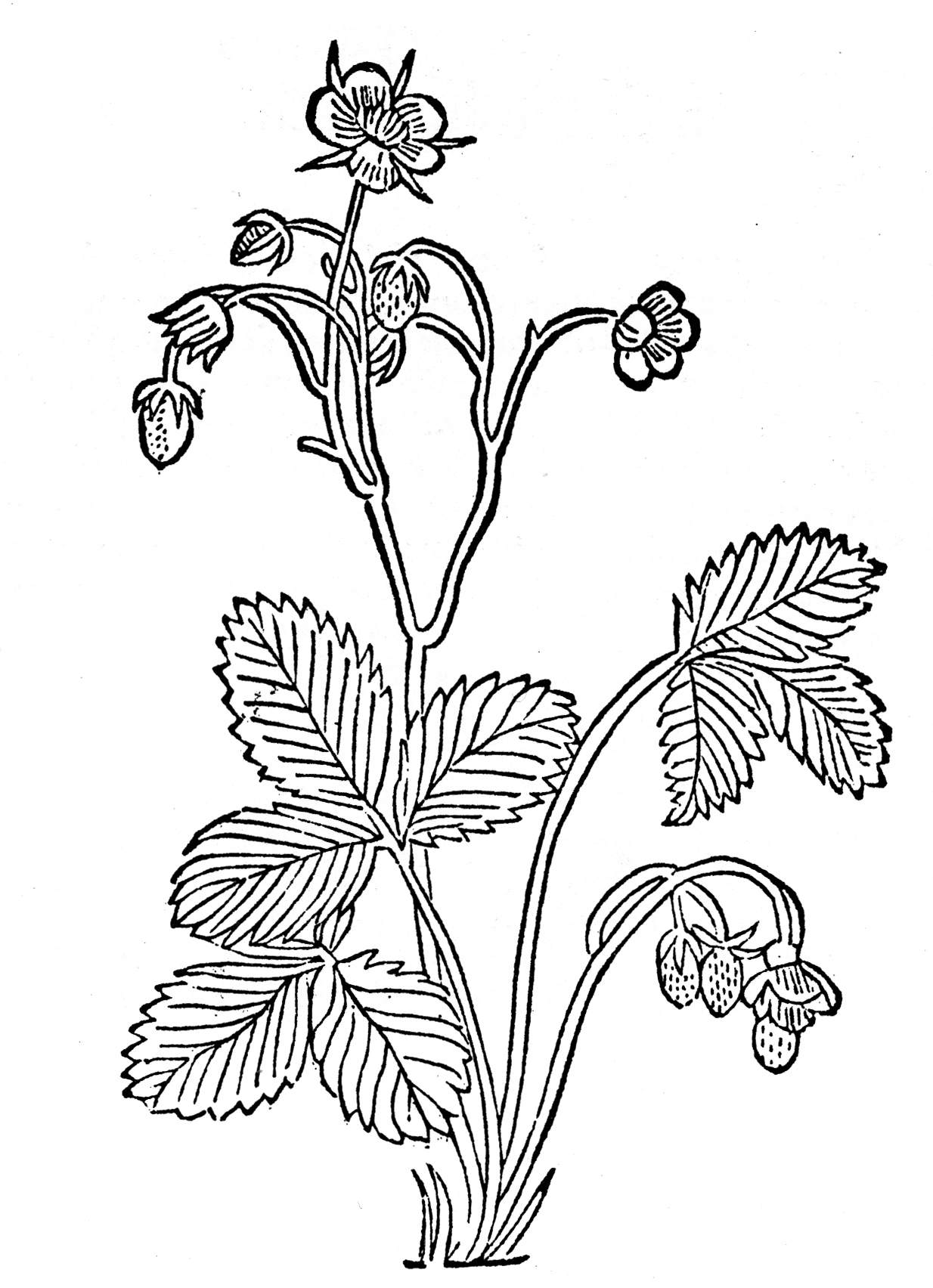
Chapter 190. Frage – ertbern

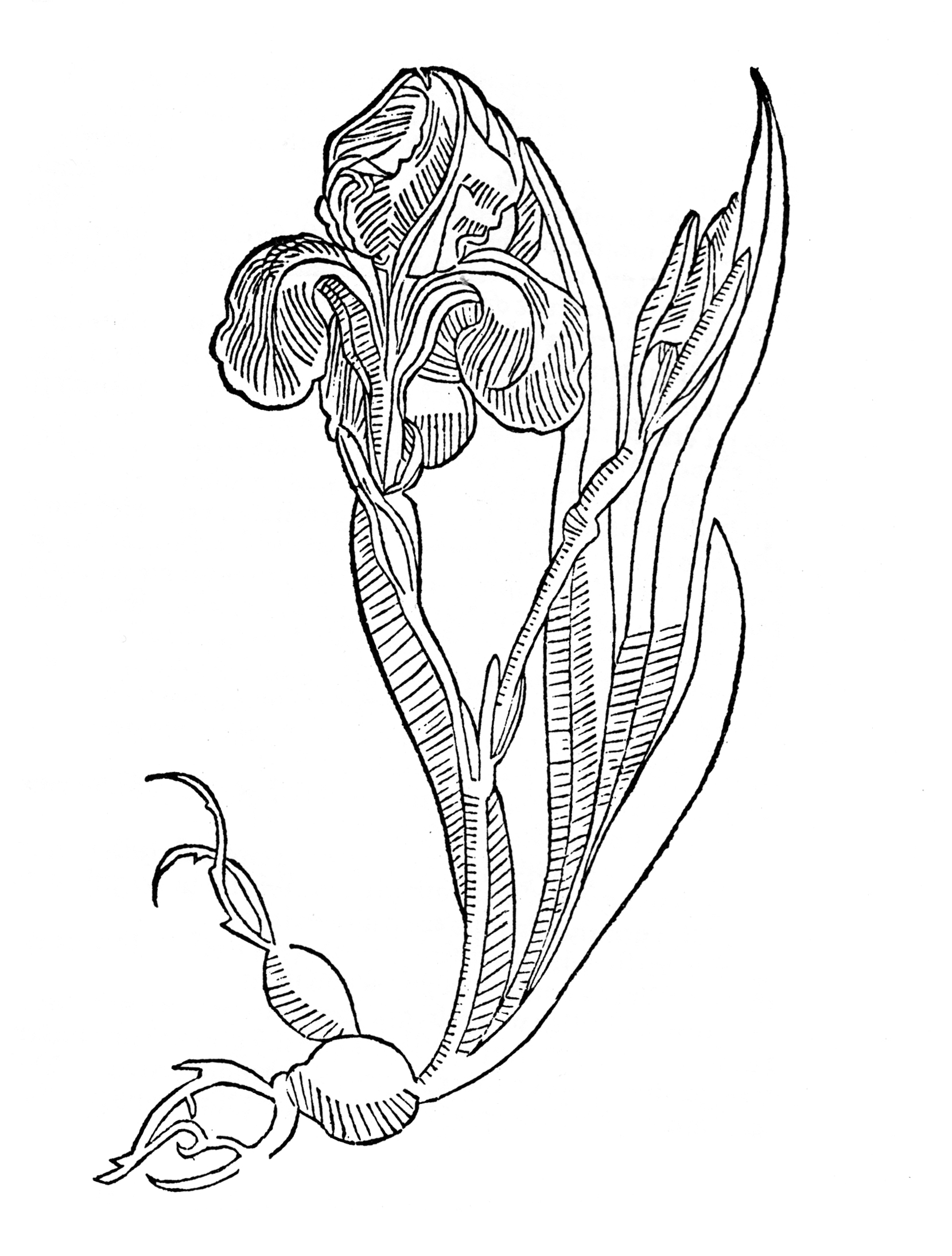
Chapter 195. Gladiolus – slotten krut oder geel swertel

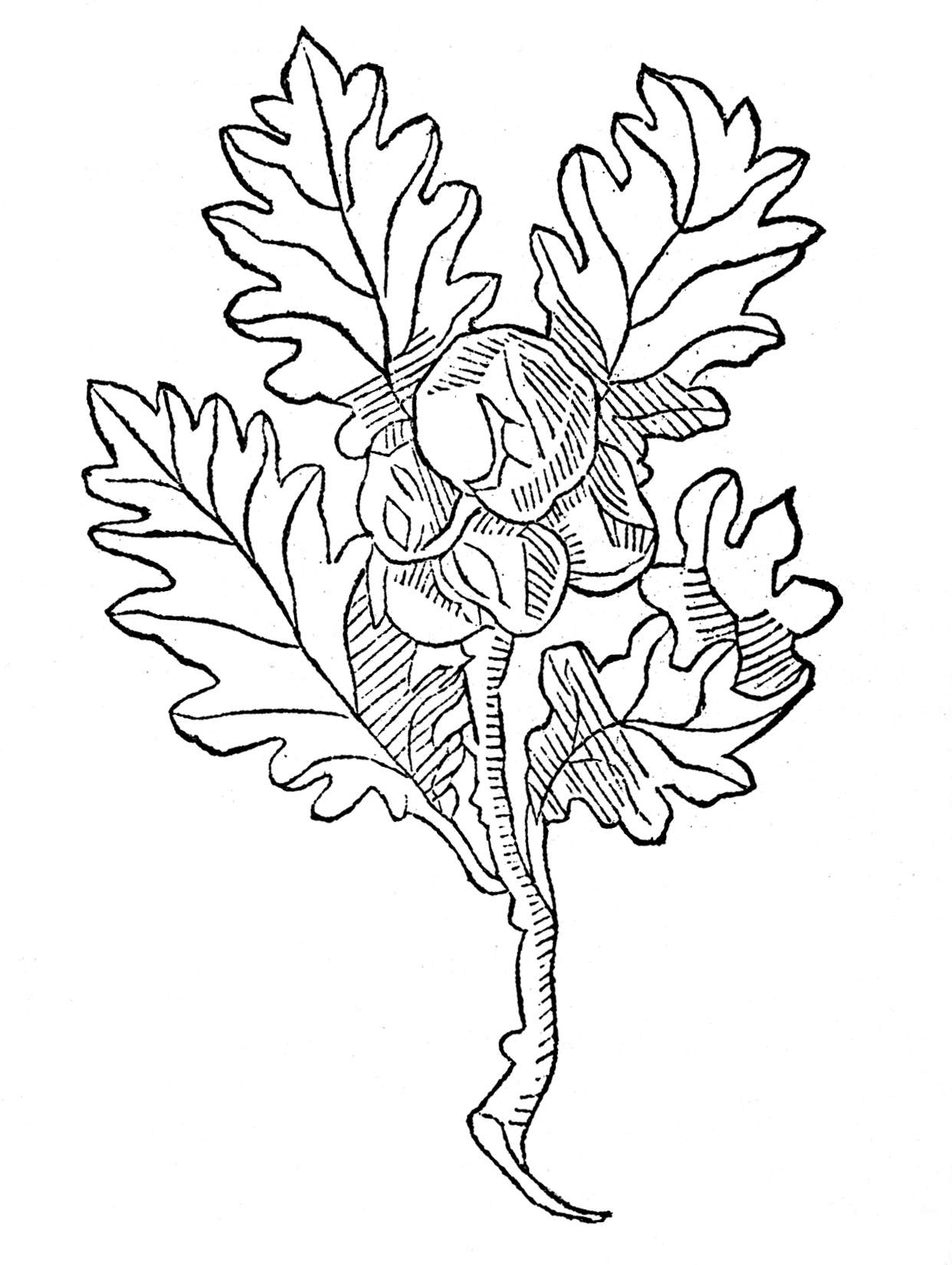
Chapter 203. Galla – galopffel

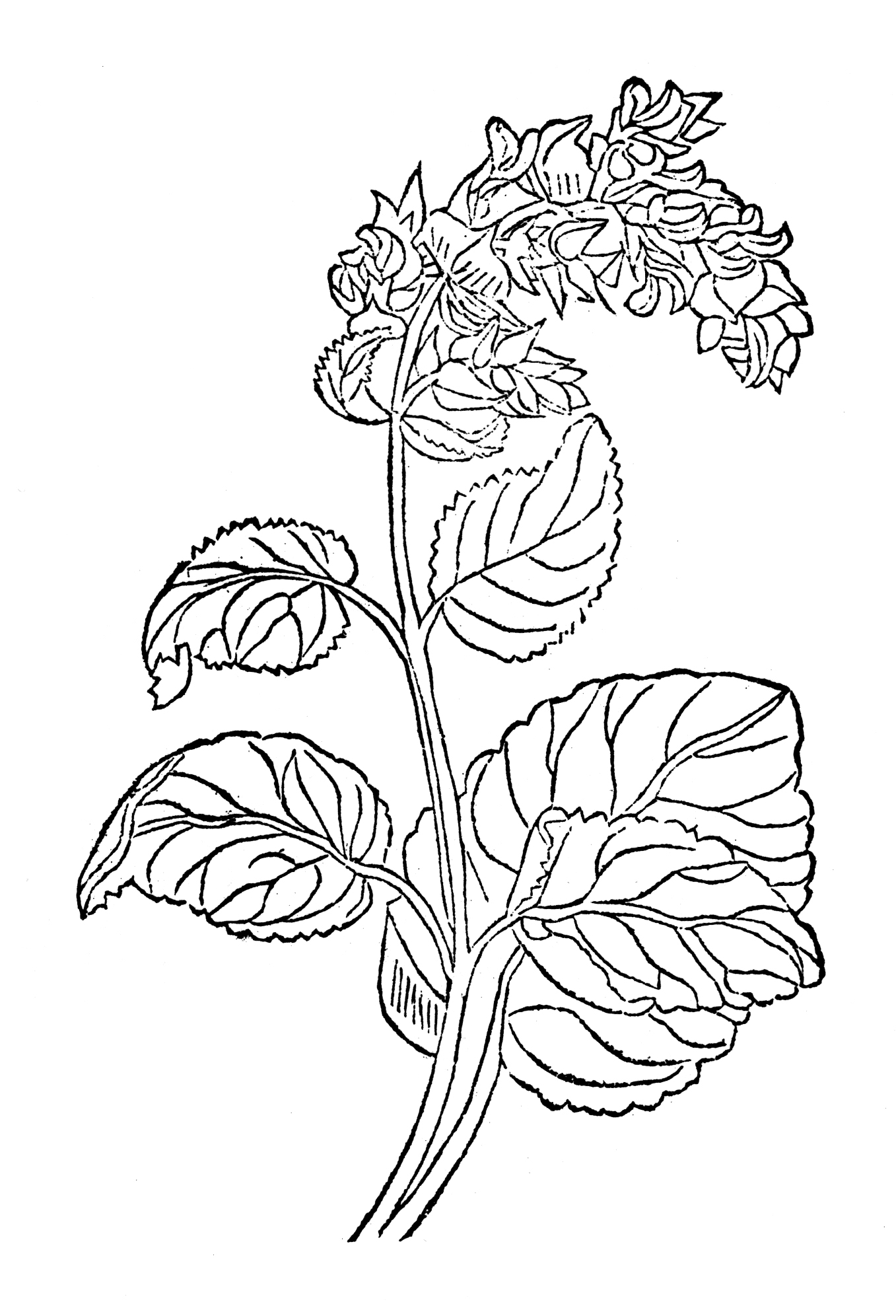
Chapter 207. Gallitricum – scharlach

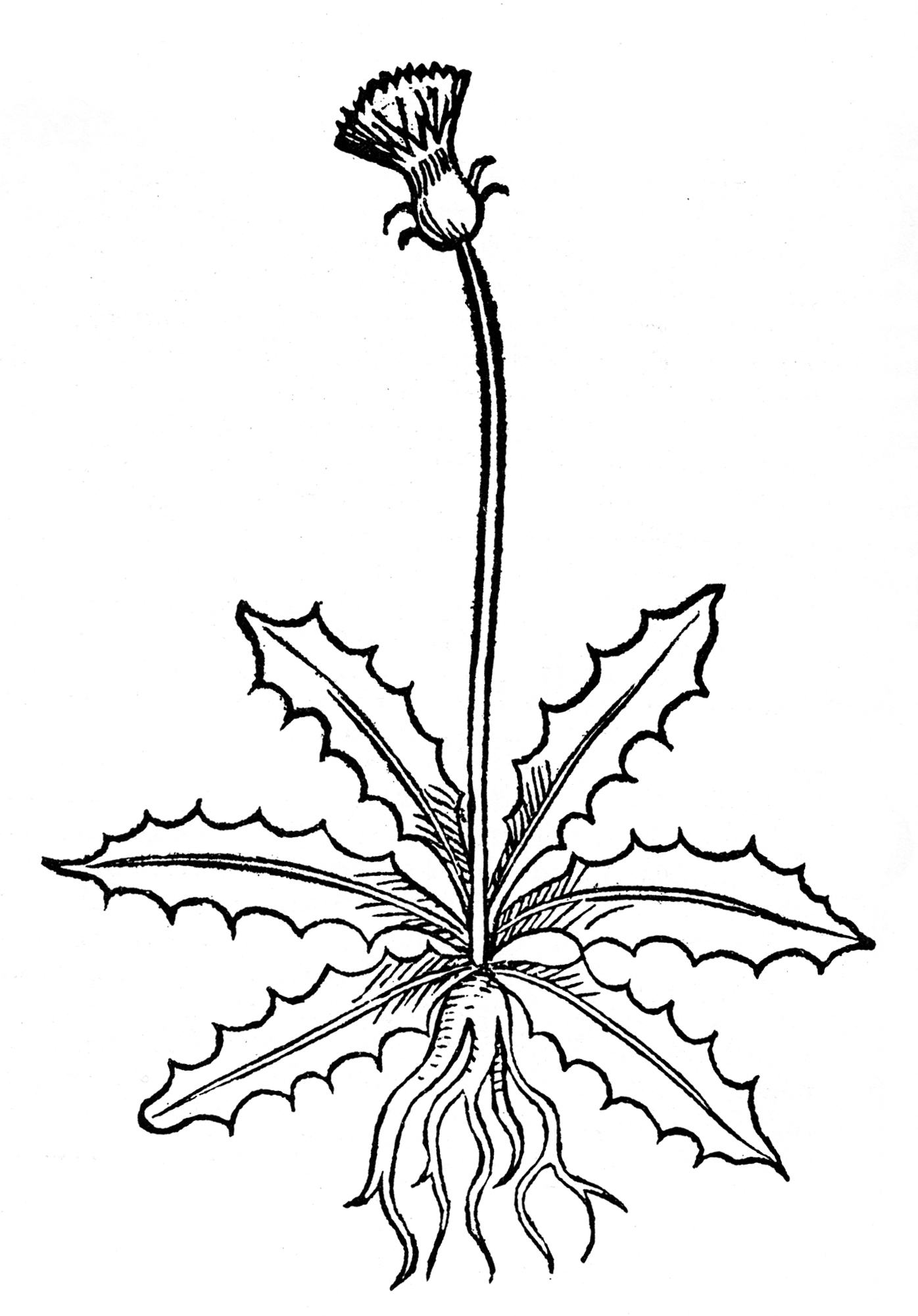
Taraxacum officinale. Falsch zugeordnet zum Kapitel 212 Hermodattilus – zytloisz

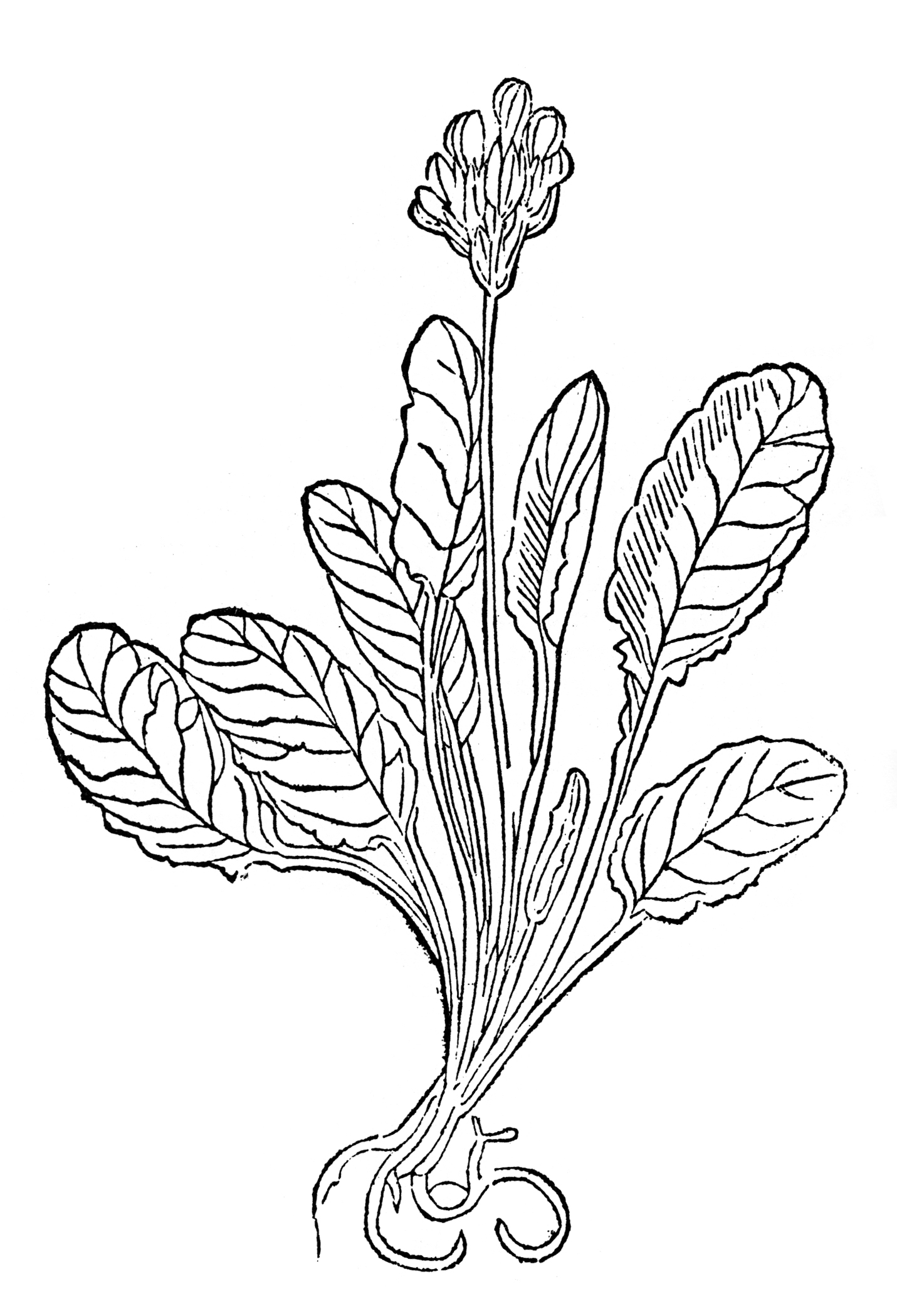
Chapter 213. Herba paralisis – slusselblomen

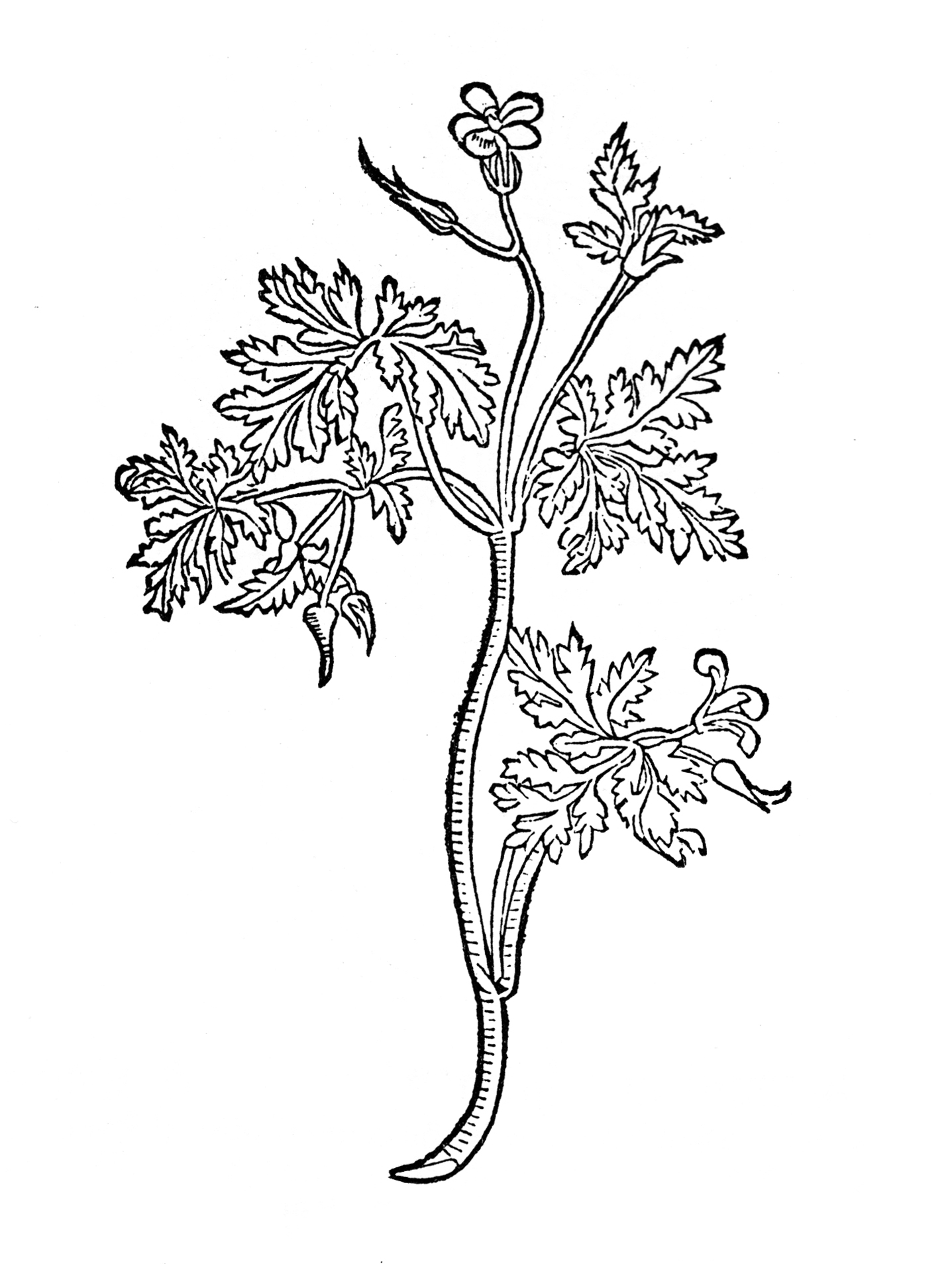
Chapter 214. Herba rubea – storckes snabel

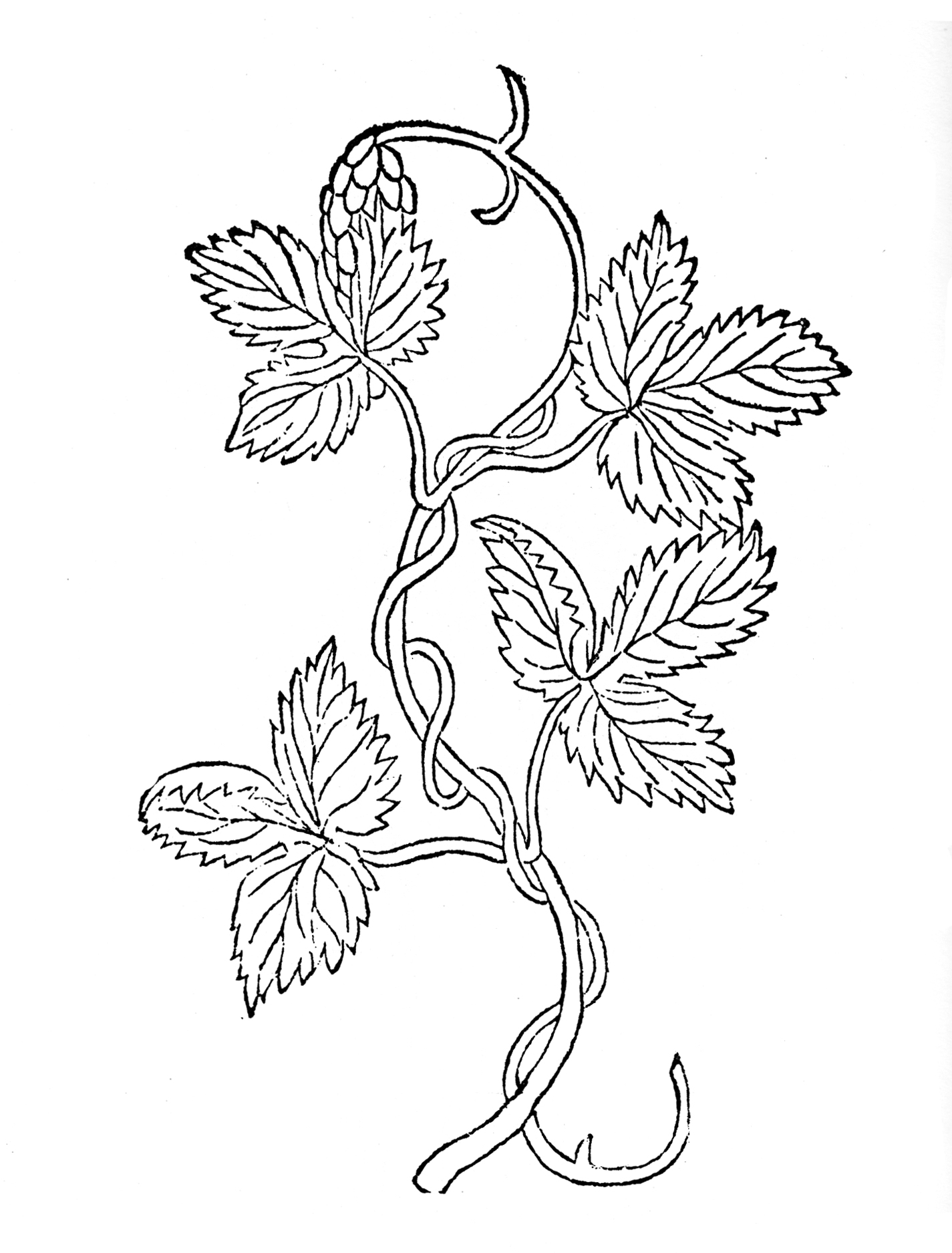
Chapter 215. Humulus – hoppen

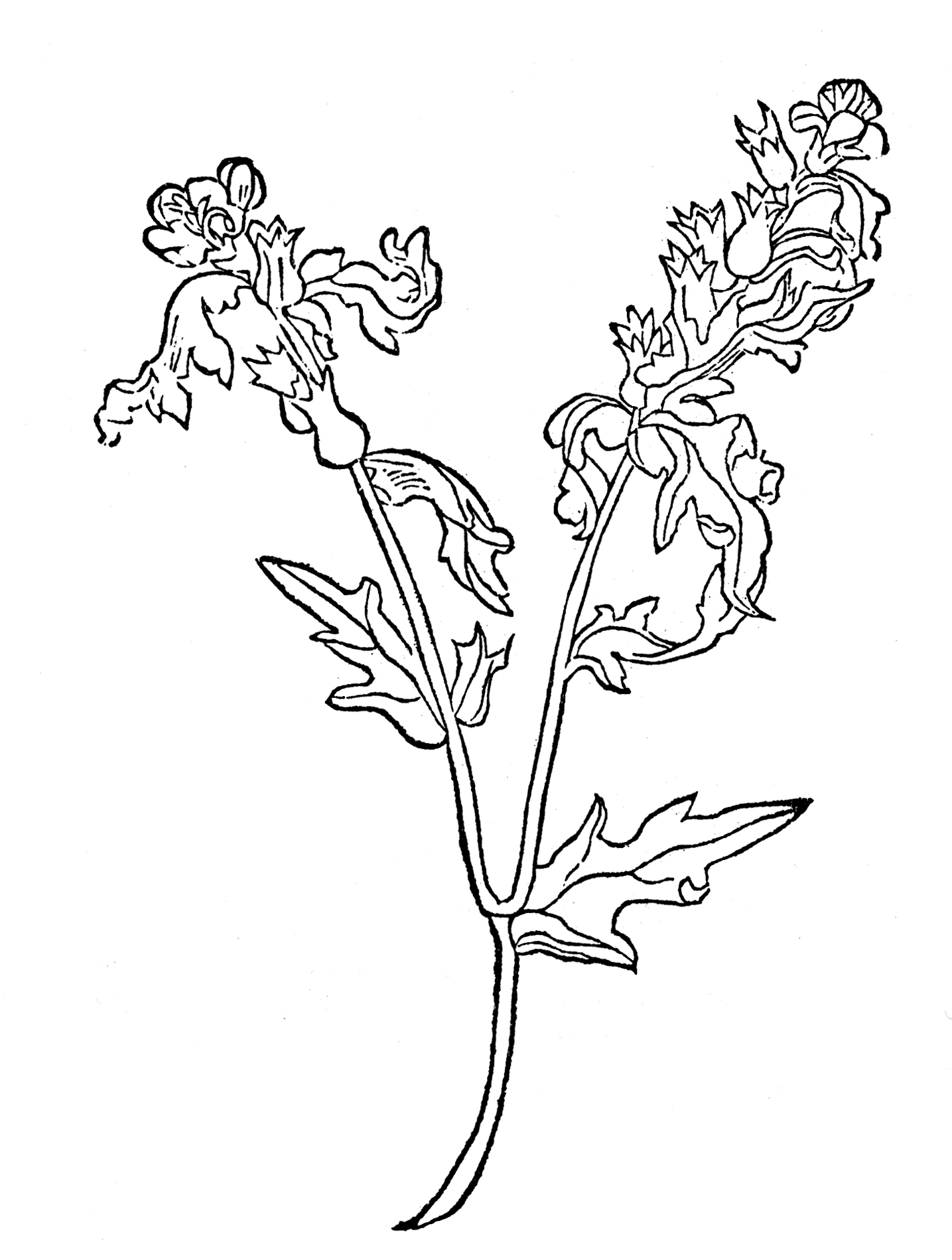
Chapter 217. Jusquiamus – bilsensamen Hyoscyamus niger / Hyoscyamus albus

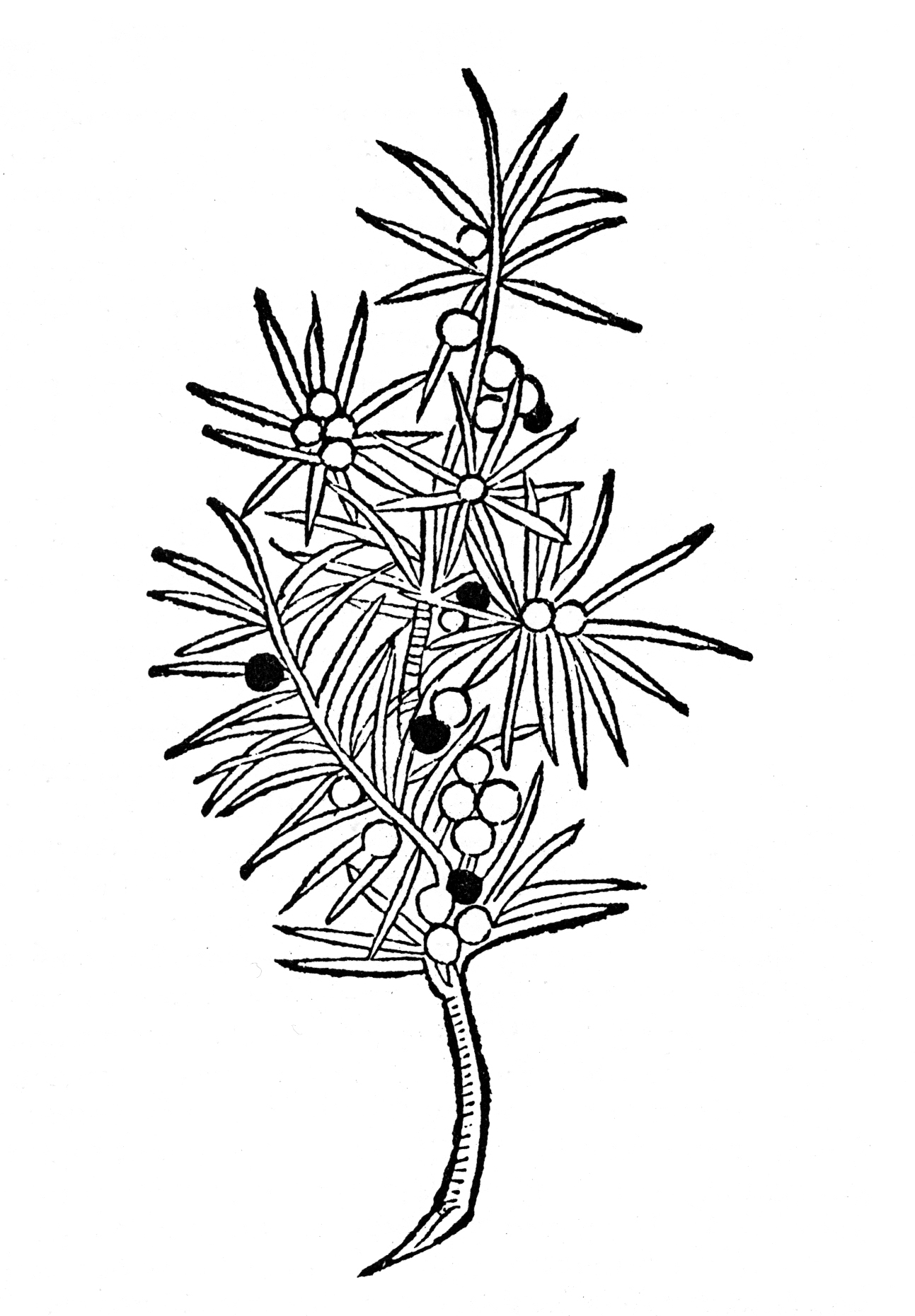
Chapter 218. Juniperus – wegholler

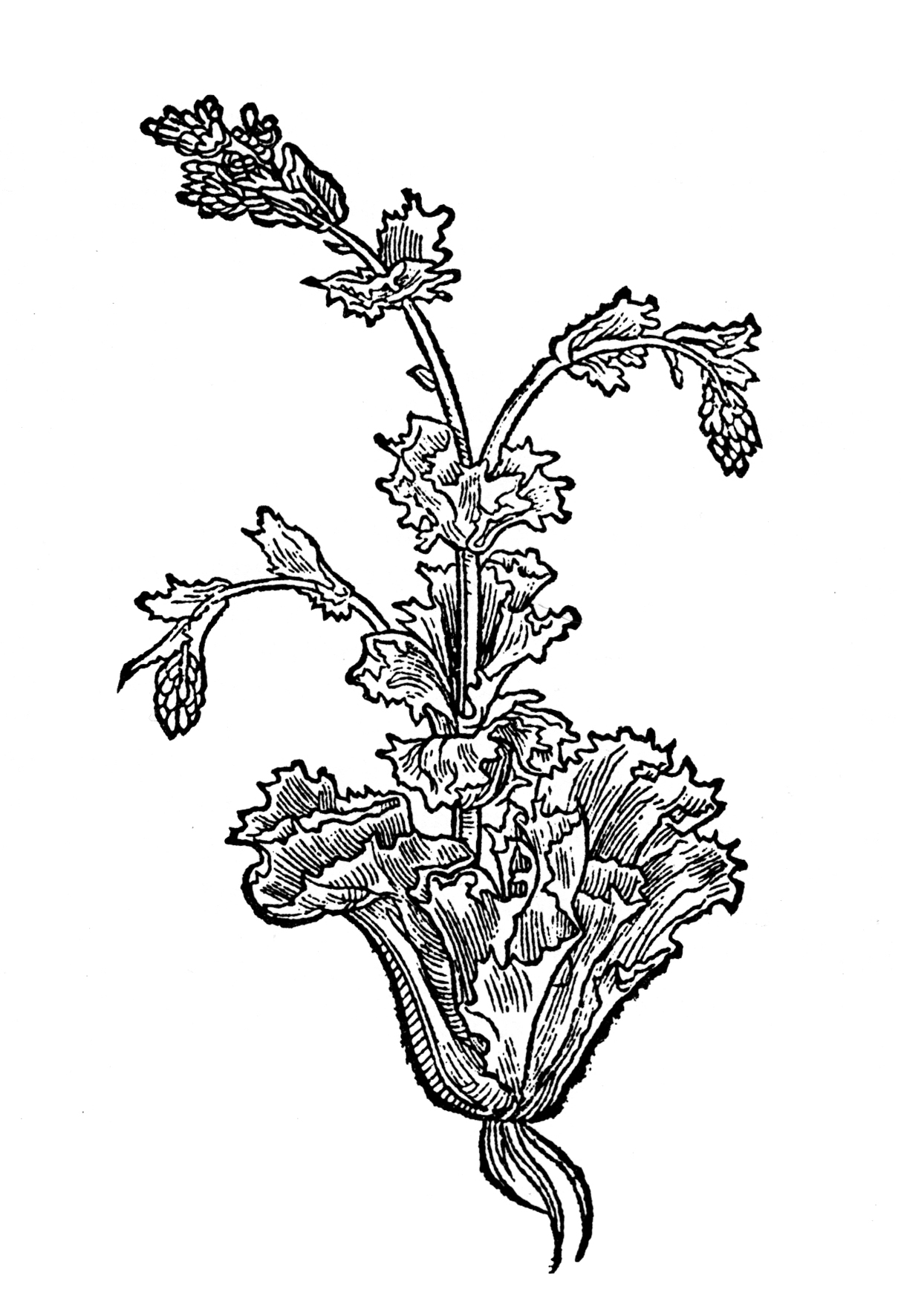
Chapter 223. Lactuca – lattich

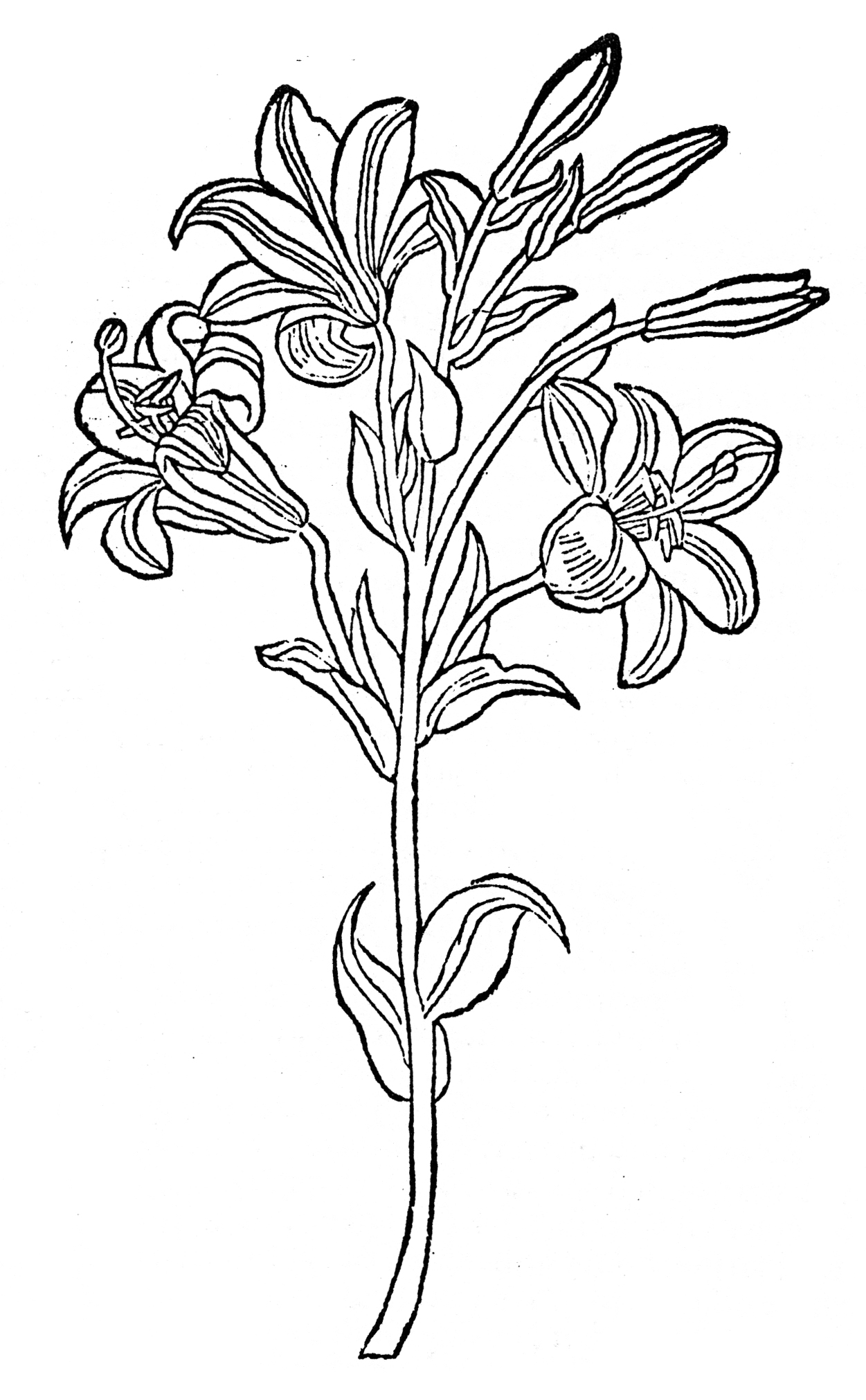
Chapter 229. Lilium album – wyß lilien

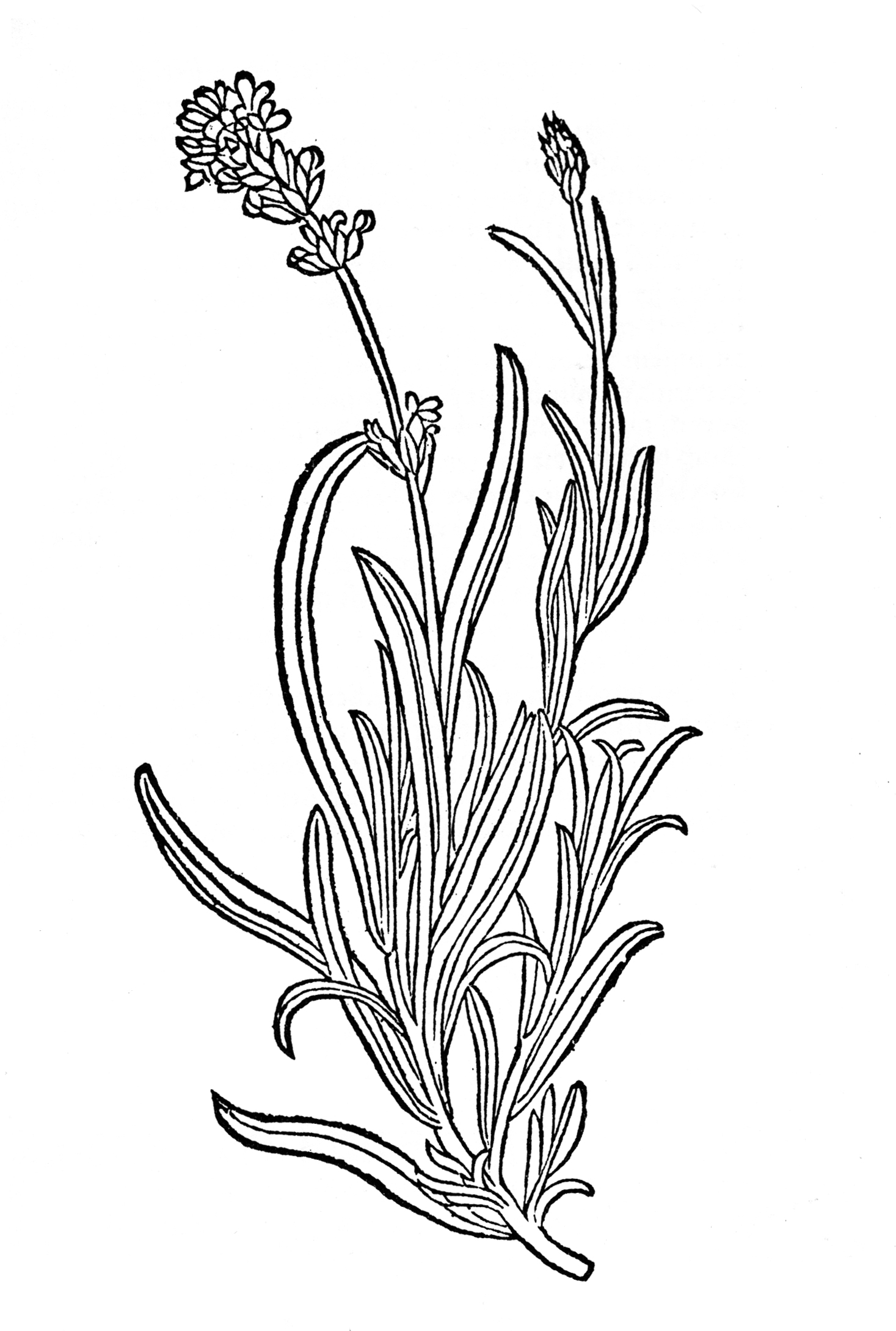
Chapter 234. Lavendula – lavendel

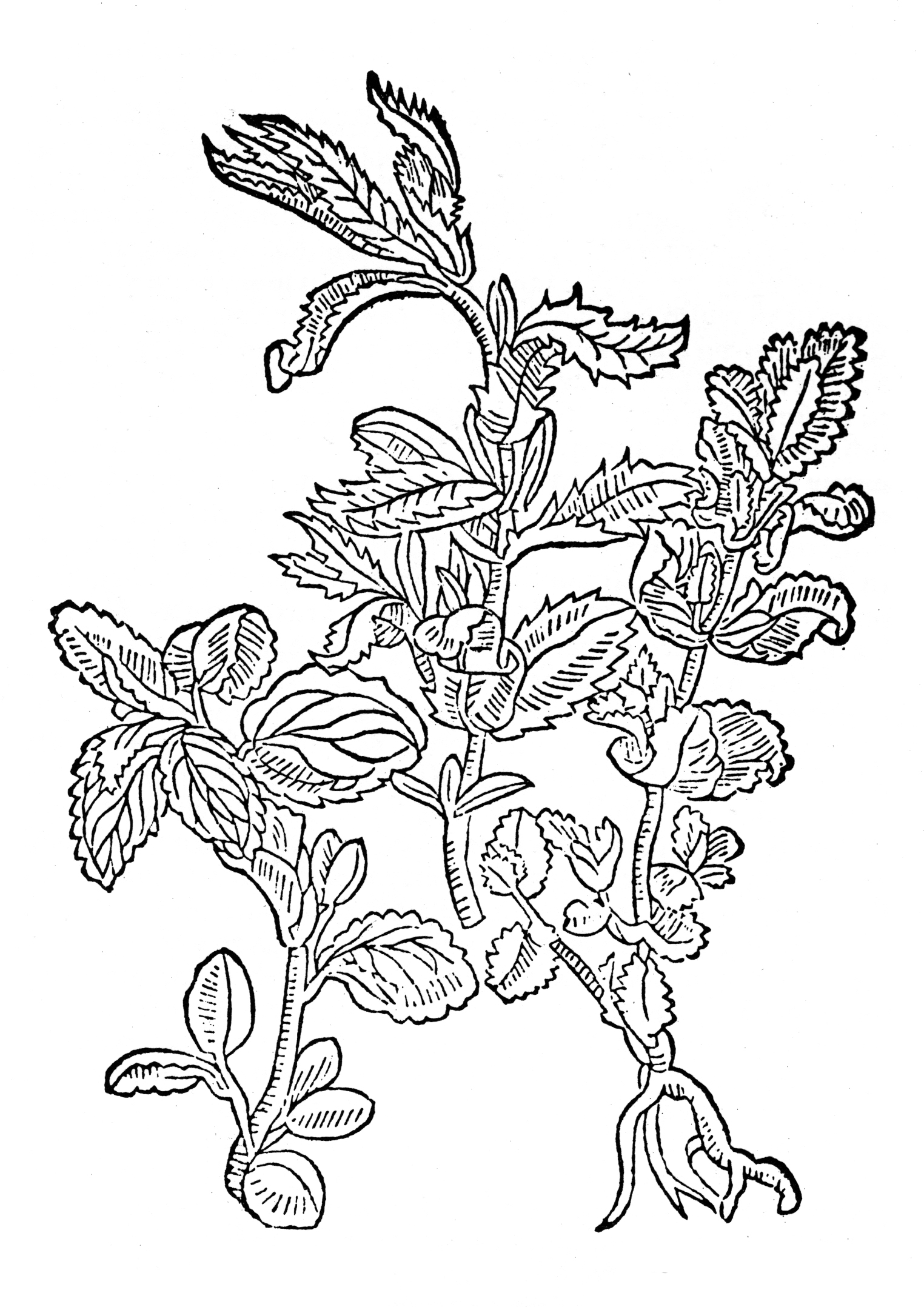
Chapter 251. Menta – myntz

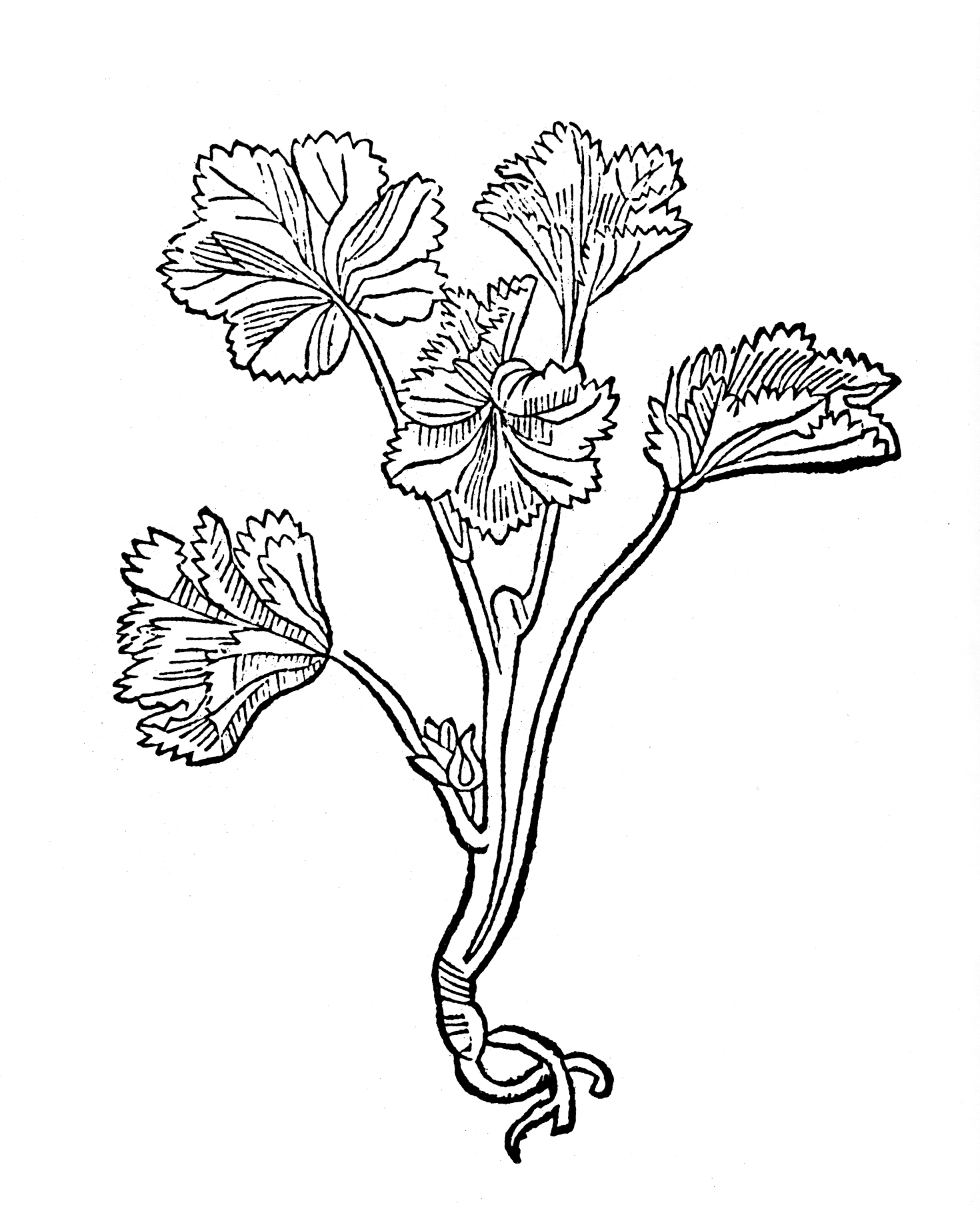
Chapter 253. Malva – bappeln

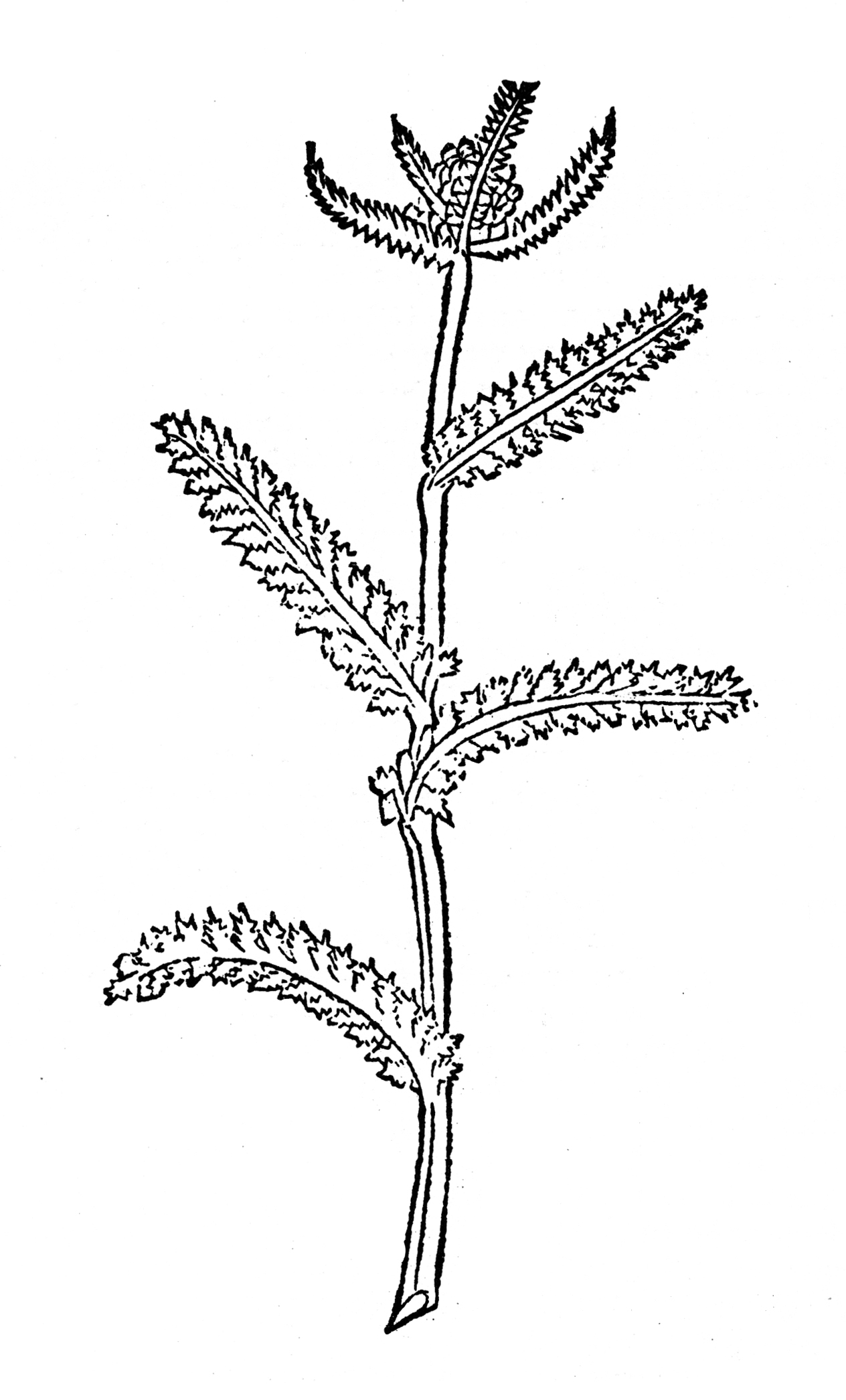
Chapter 254. Millefolium – garbe

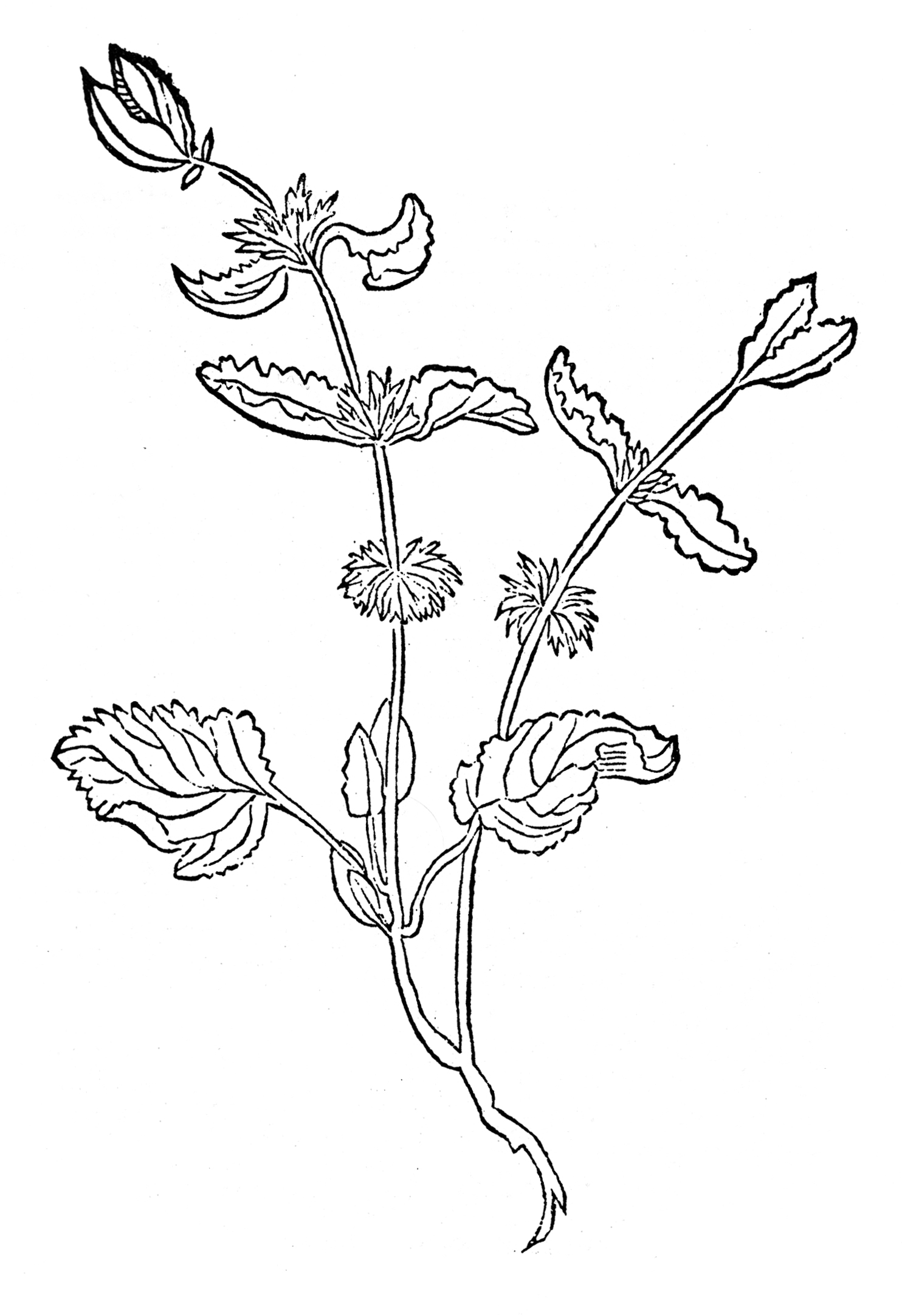
Chapter 256. Marrubium – andorn

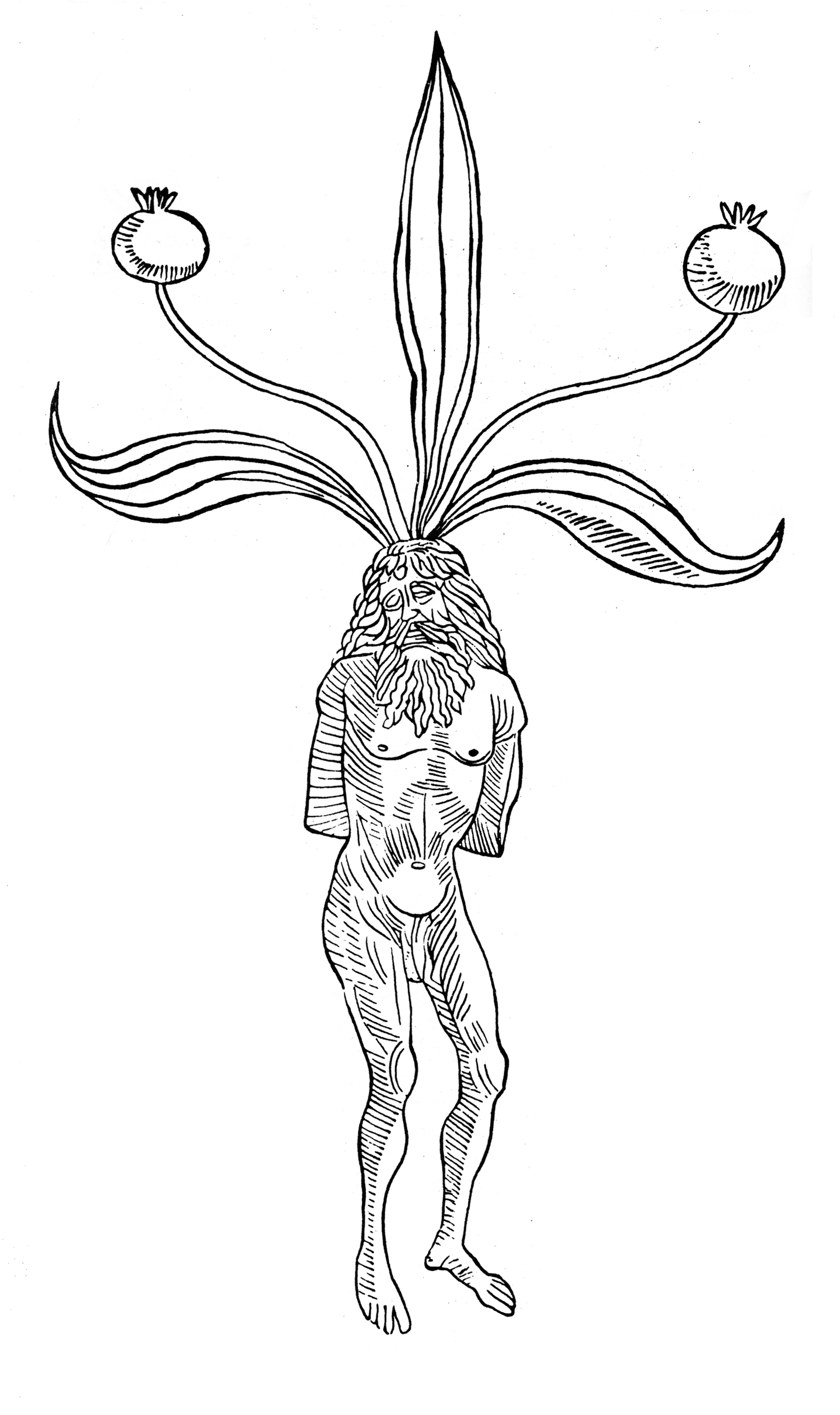
Chapter 257. Mandragora – alrun Man

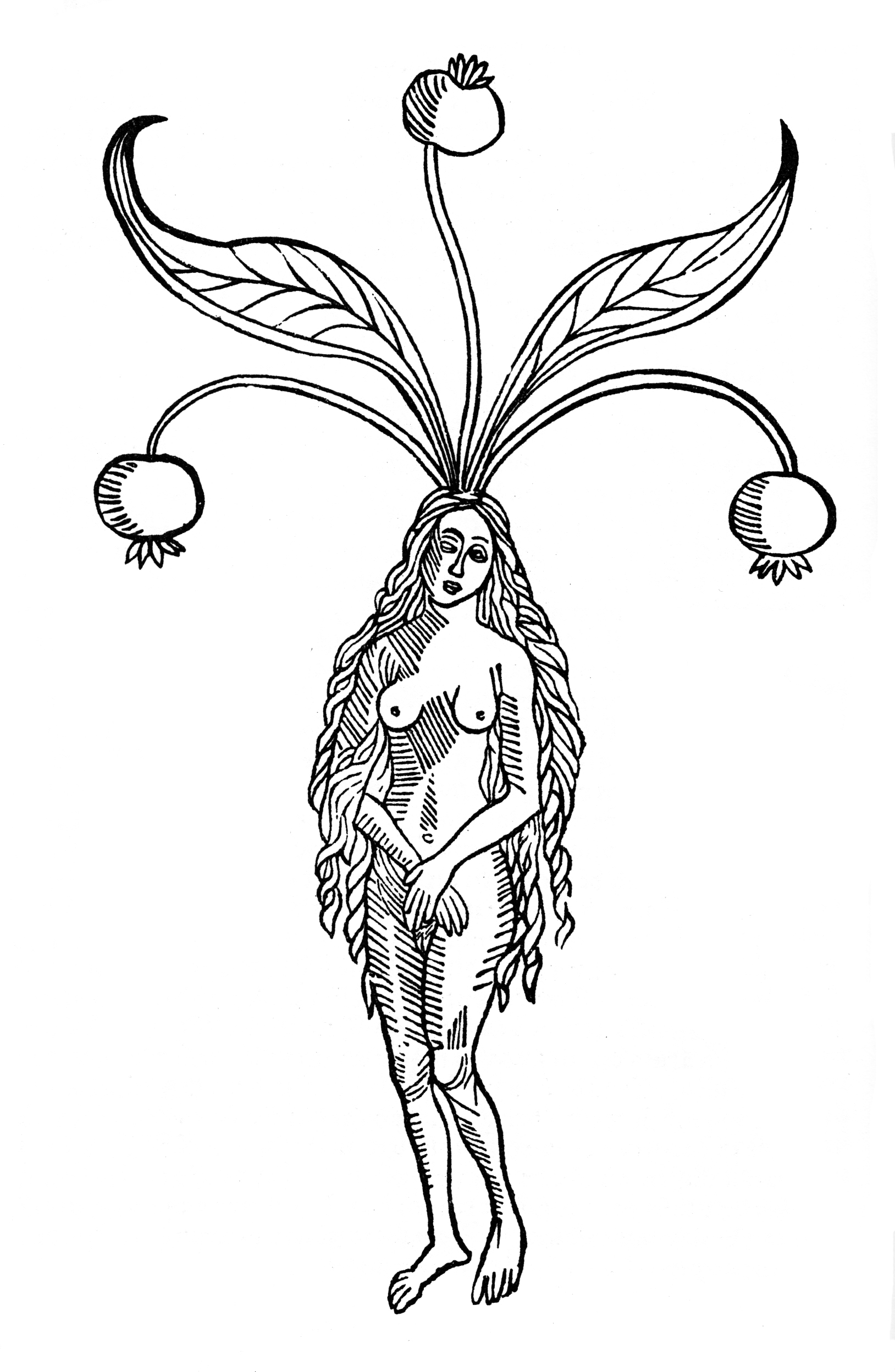
Chapter 258. Mandragora – alrun Fraw

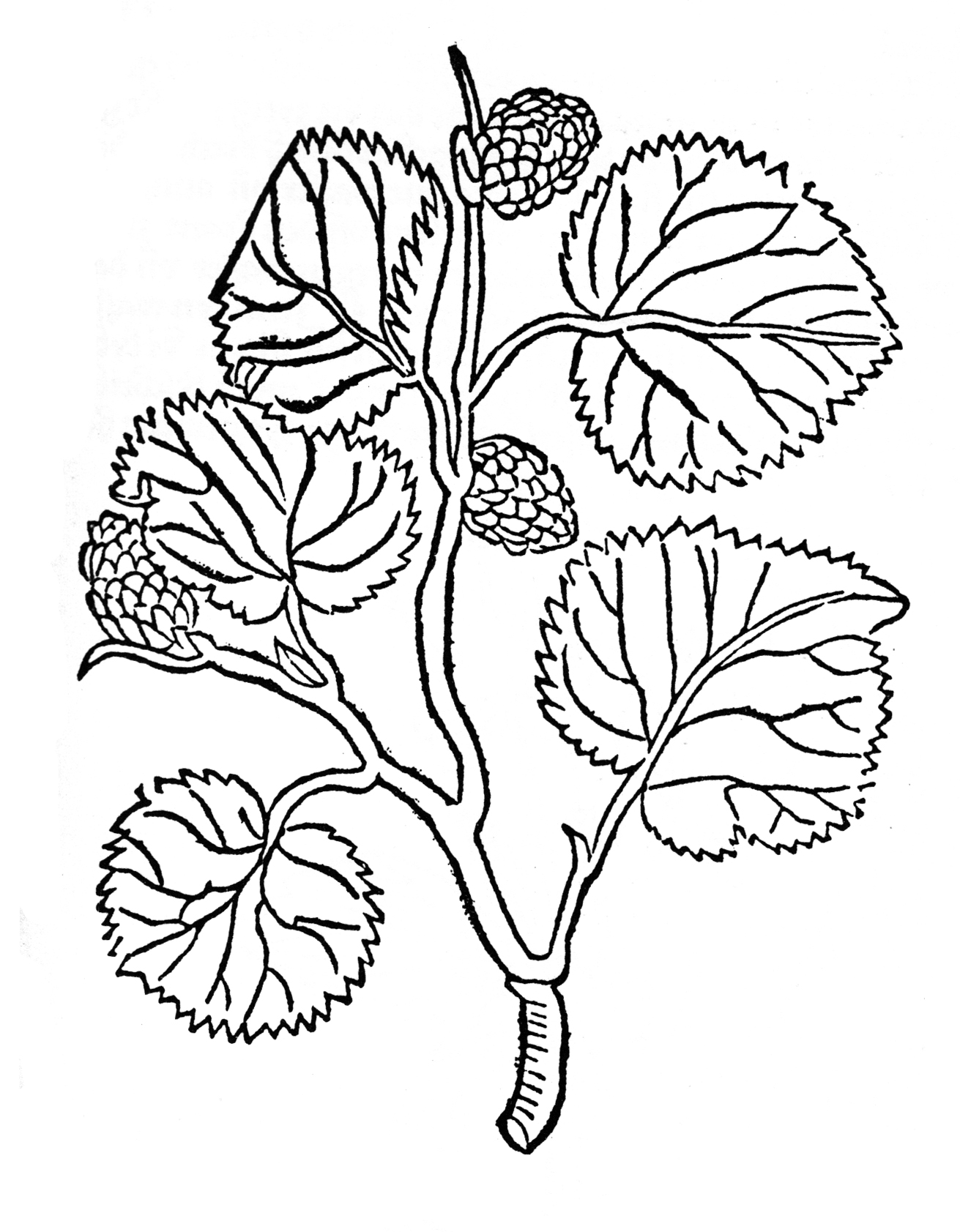
Chapter 260. Moracelsi – mulberen Morus alba / Morus nigra

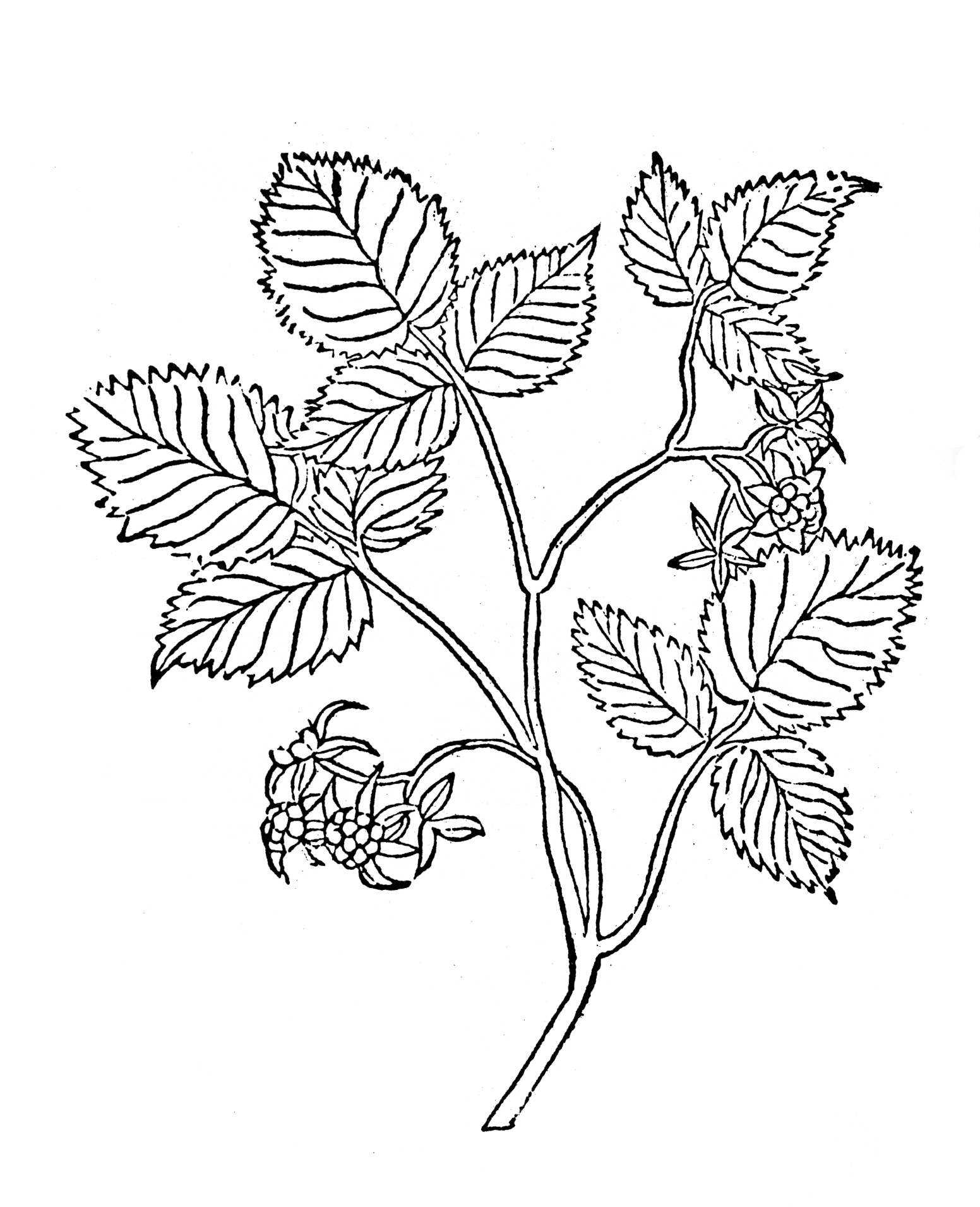
Chapter 263. Morabacci – brambernstruch

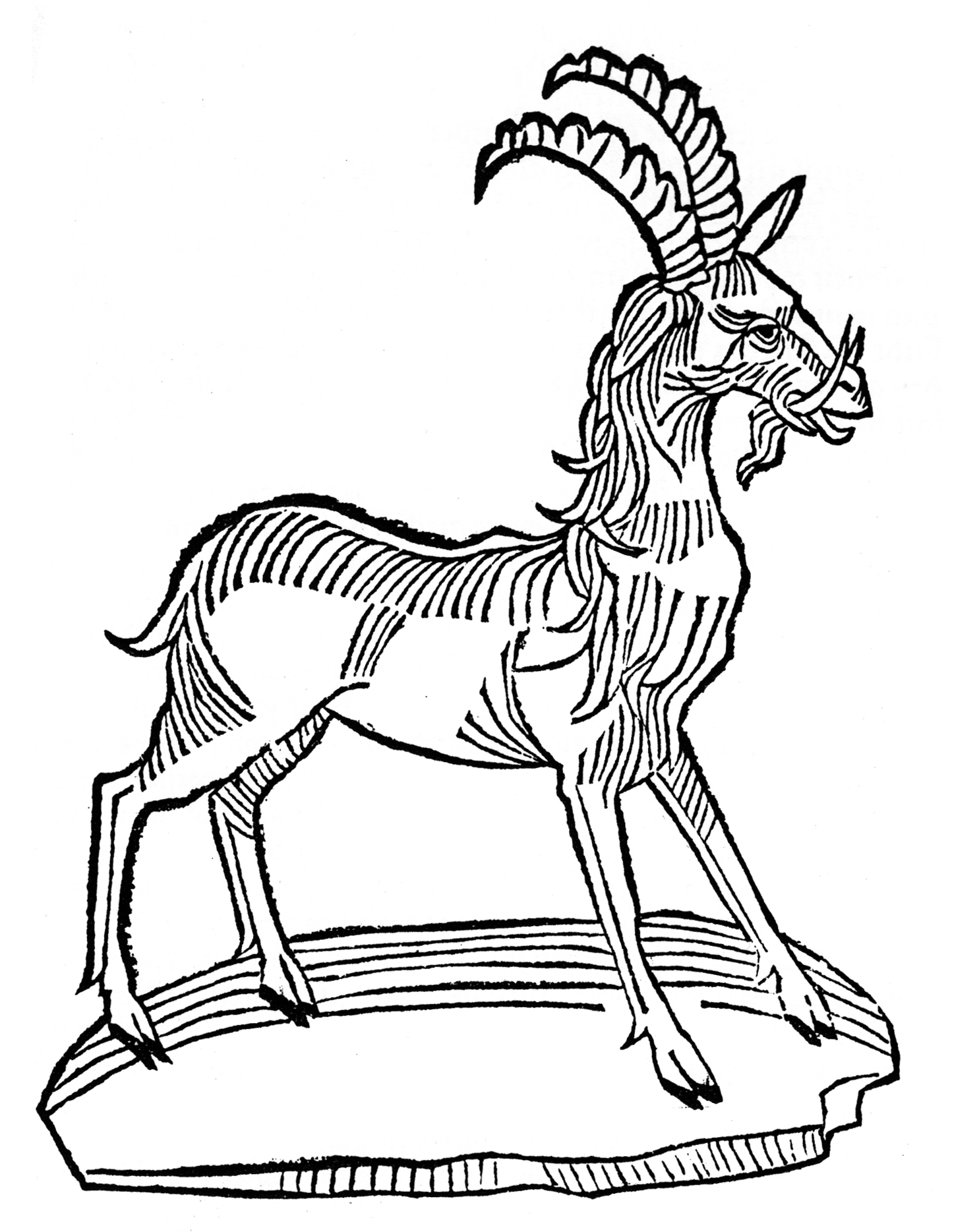
Chapter 272. Muscus – bysum

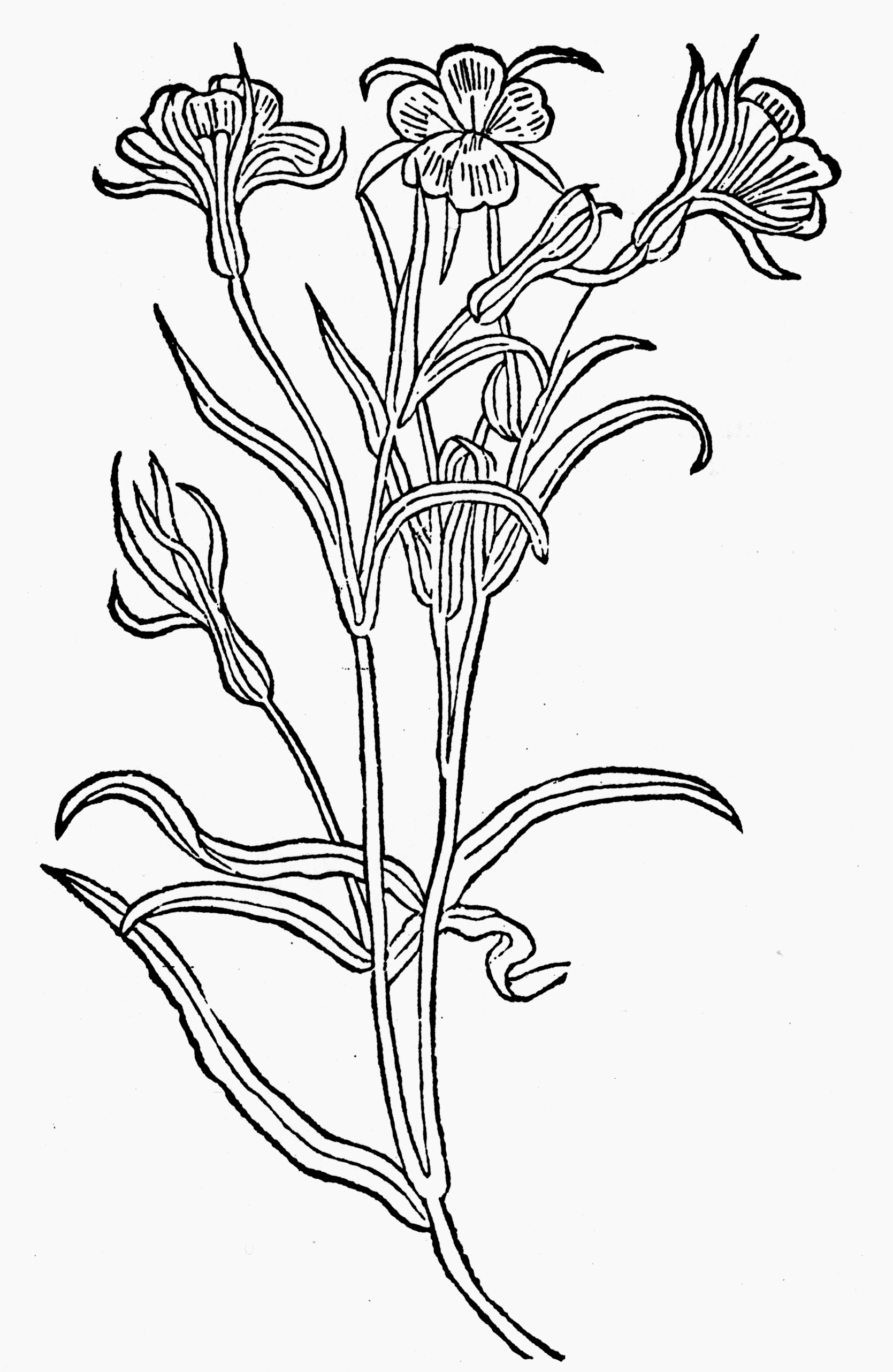
Chapter 277. Nigella – raden

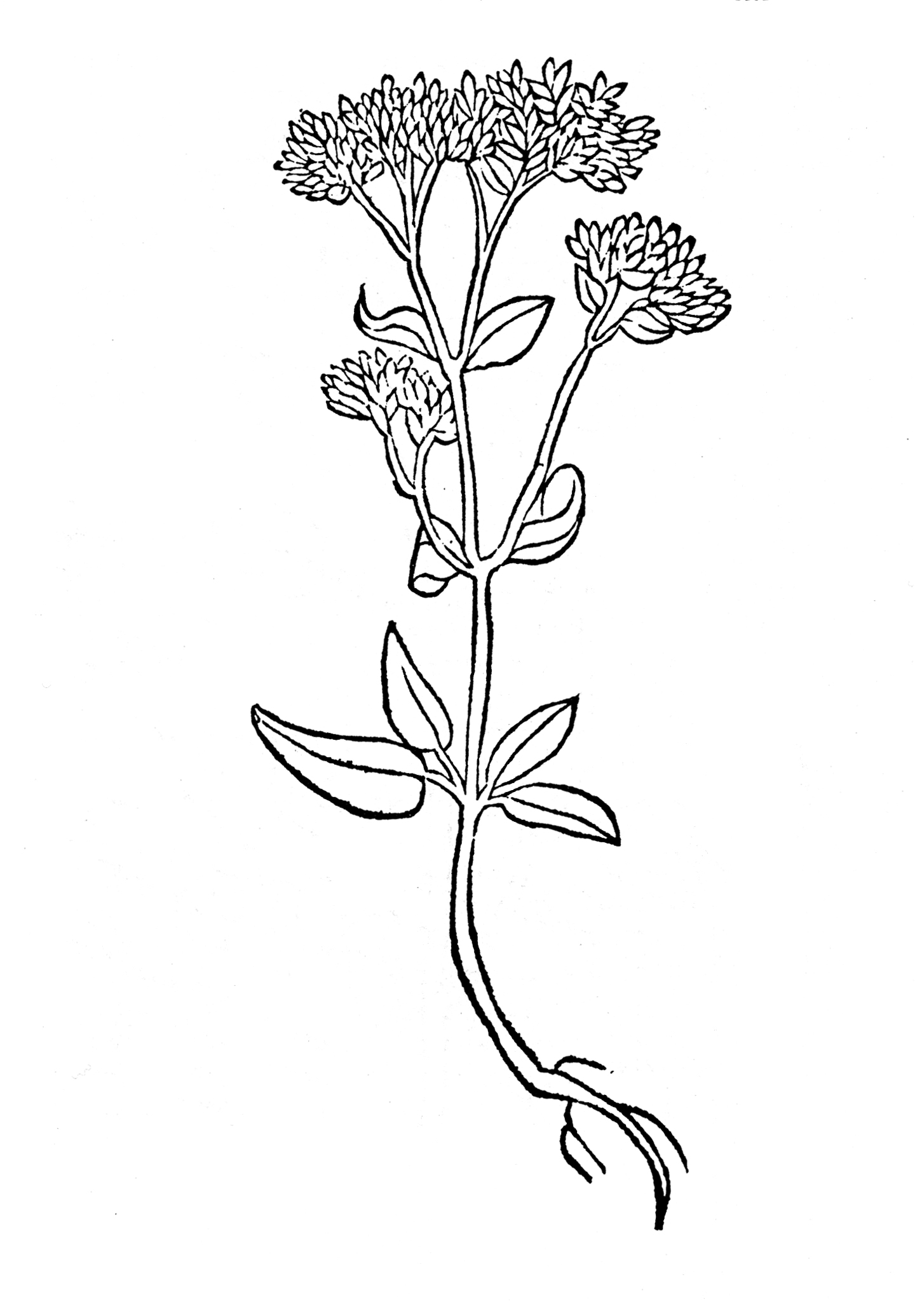
Chapter 285. Orgianum – dosten

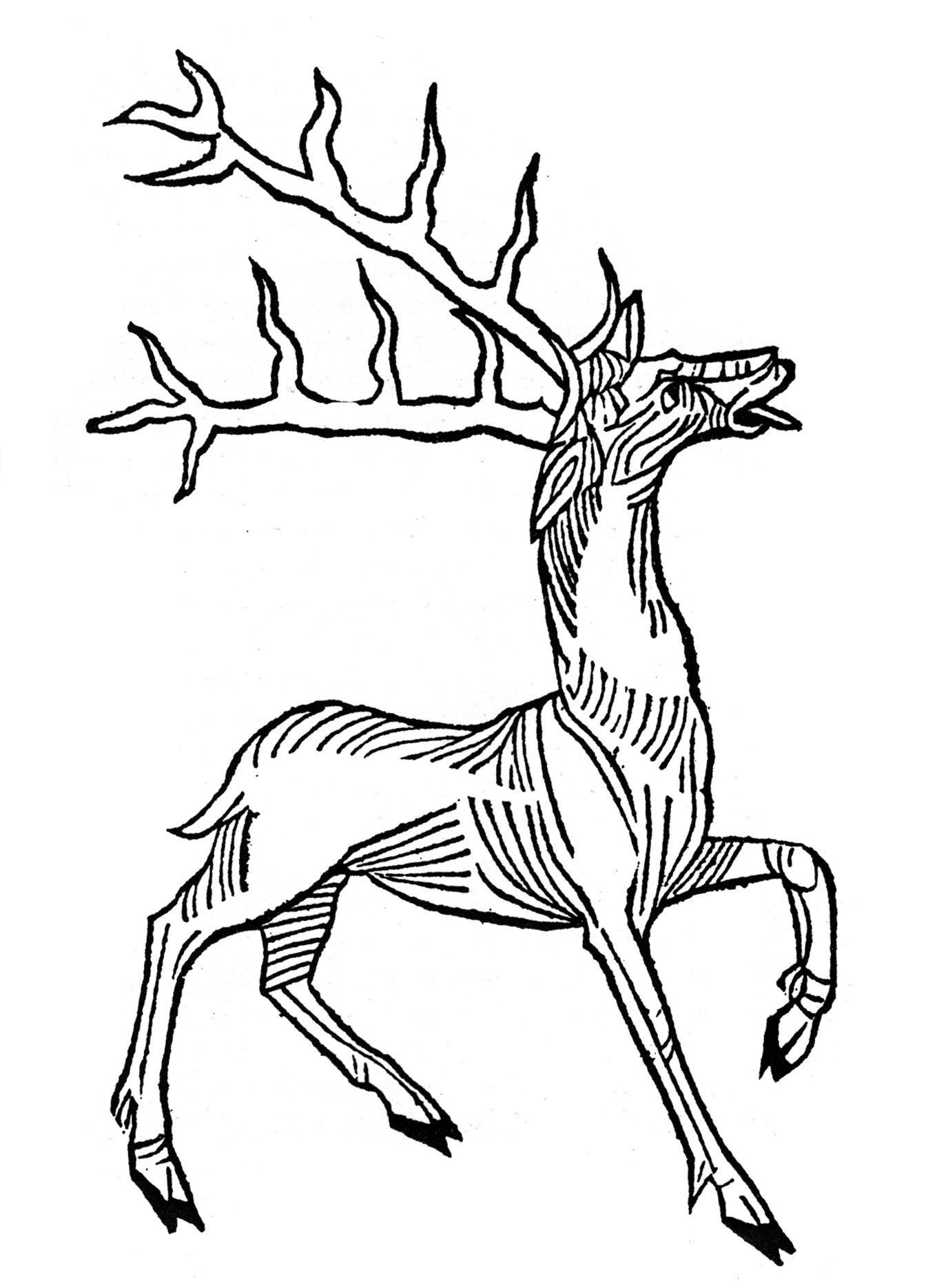
Chapter 292. Os de corde cervi – eyn beyn daz man fyndet in dem hertzen des hirtzen

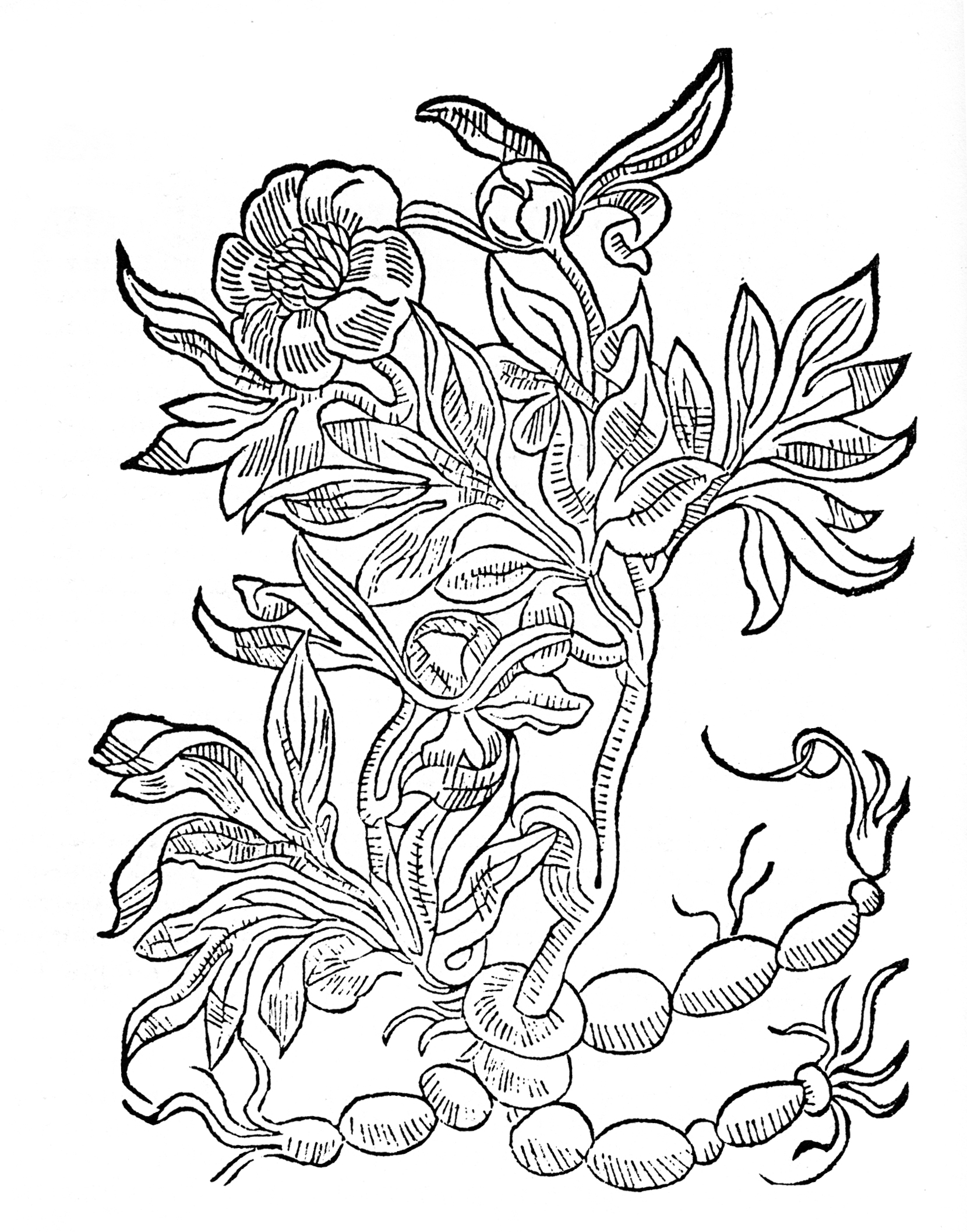
Chapter 298. Pionia – benonien korner oder benedicten korner

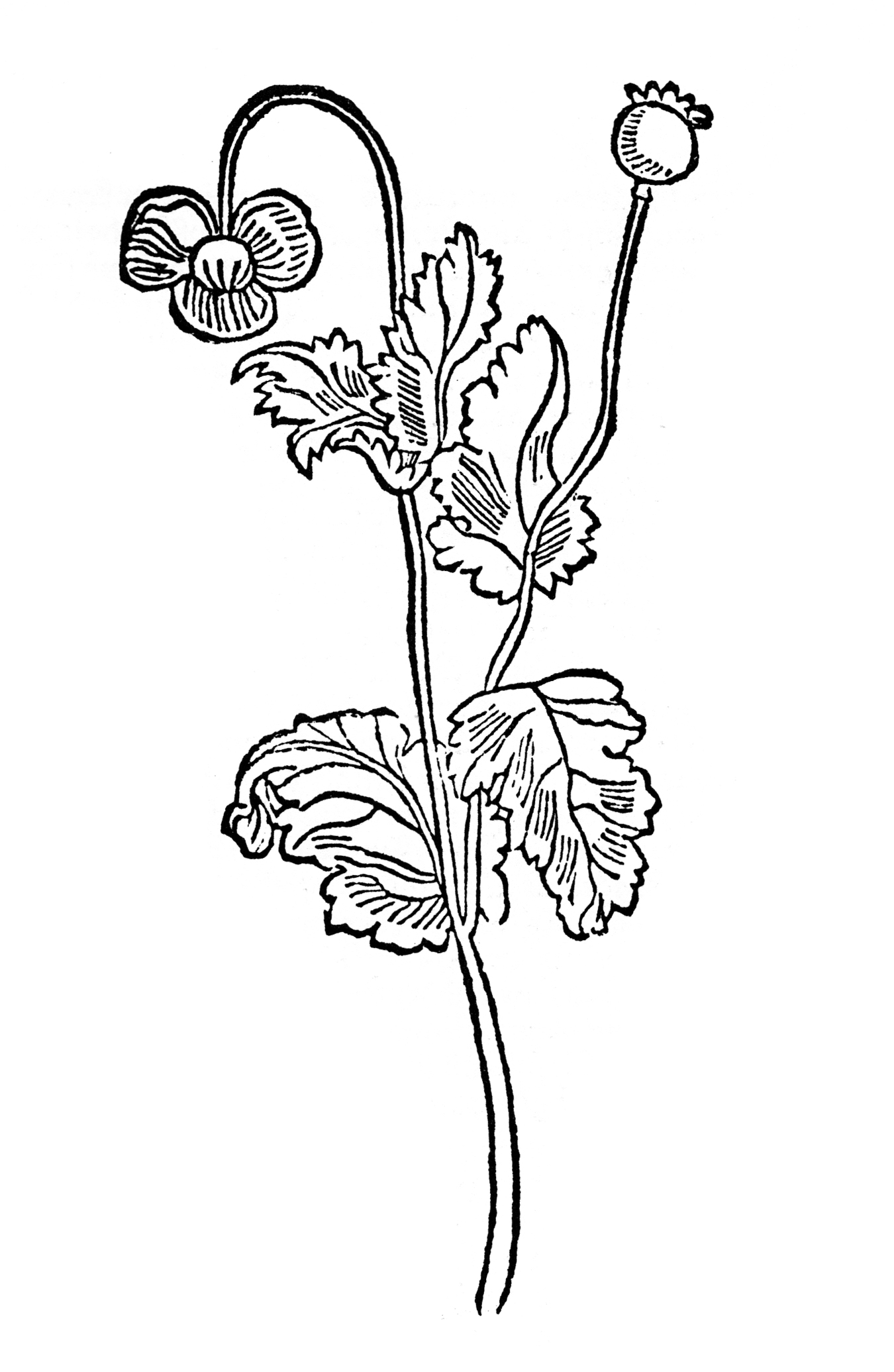
Chapter 299. Papaver – magsamen

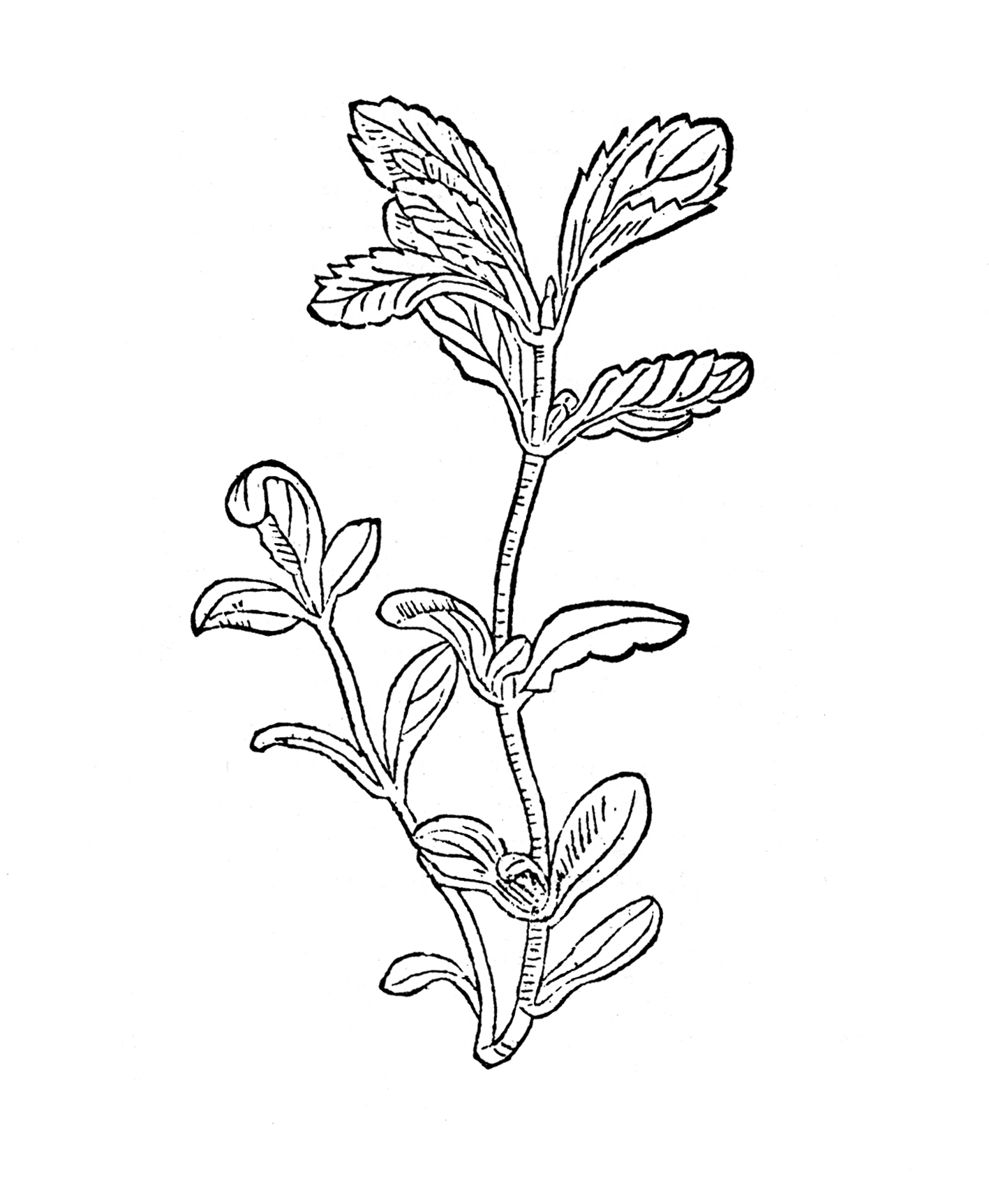
Chapter 300. Polegium – poley

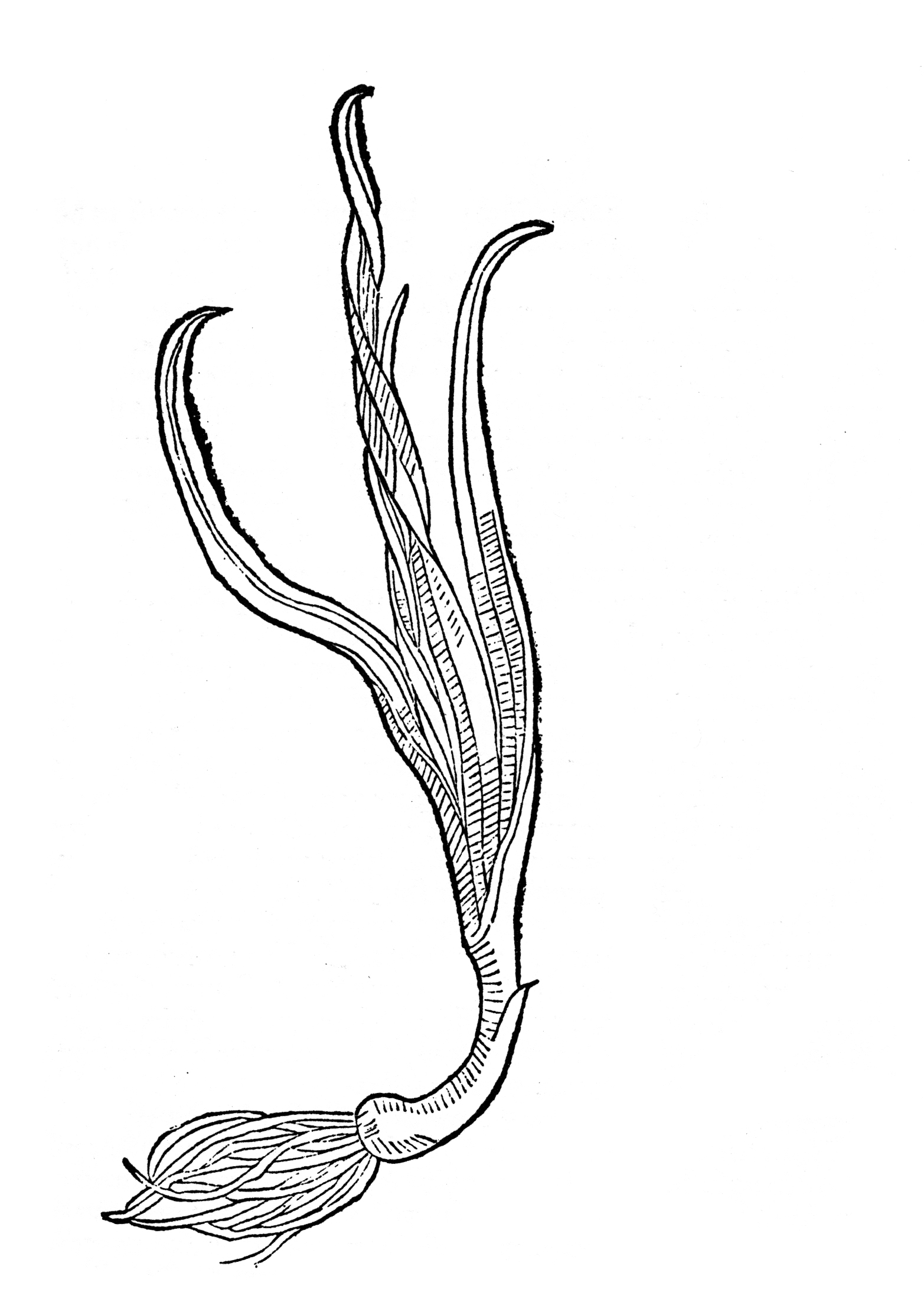
Chapter 303. Porrum – lauch

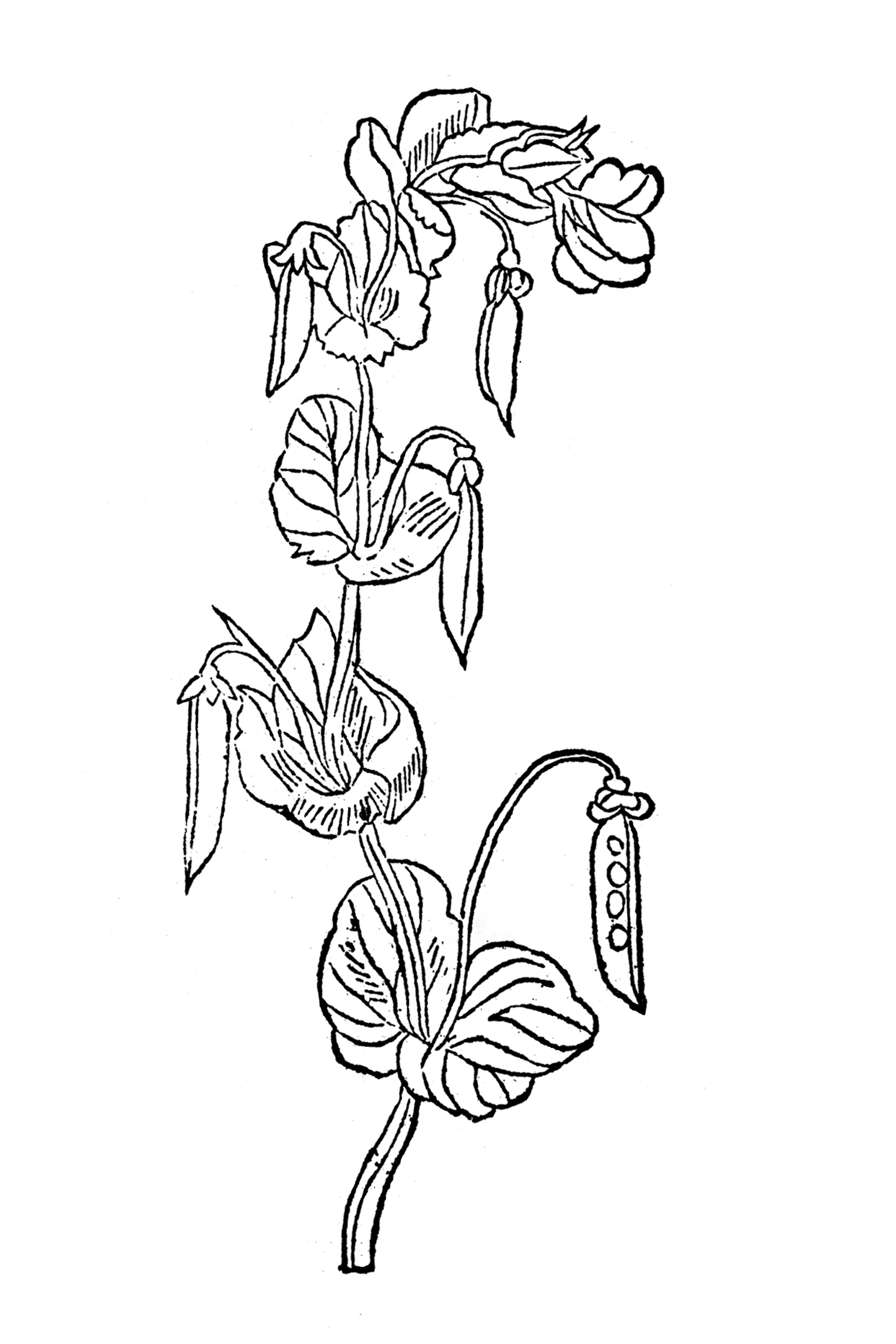
Chapter 319. pisa – heyssen erbeys

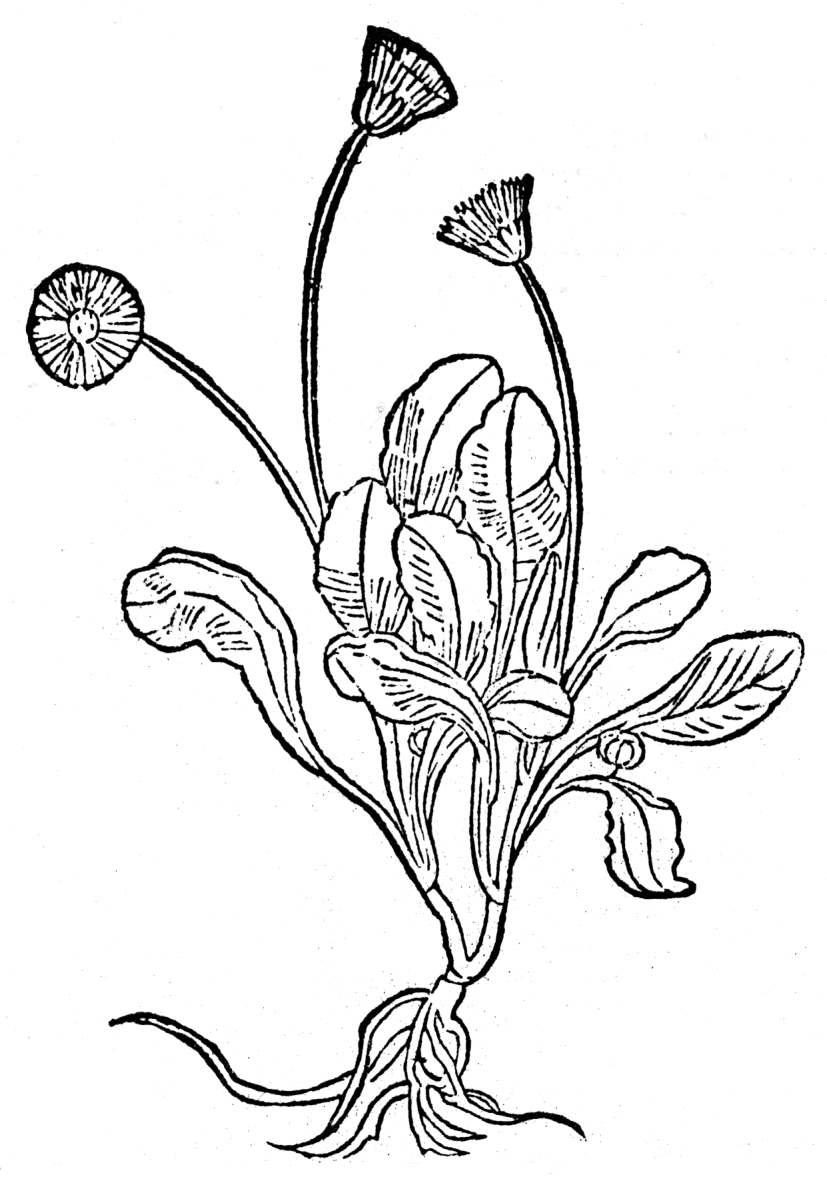
Chapter 333. Premula veris – maßlieben

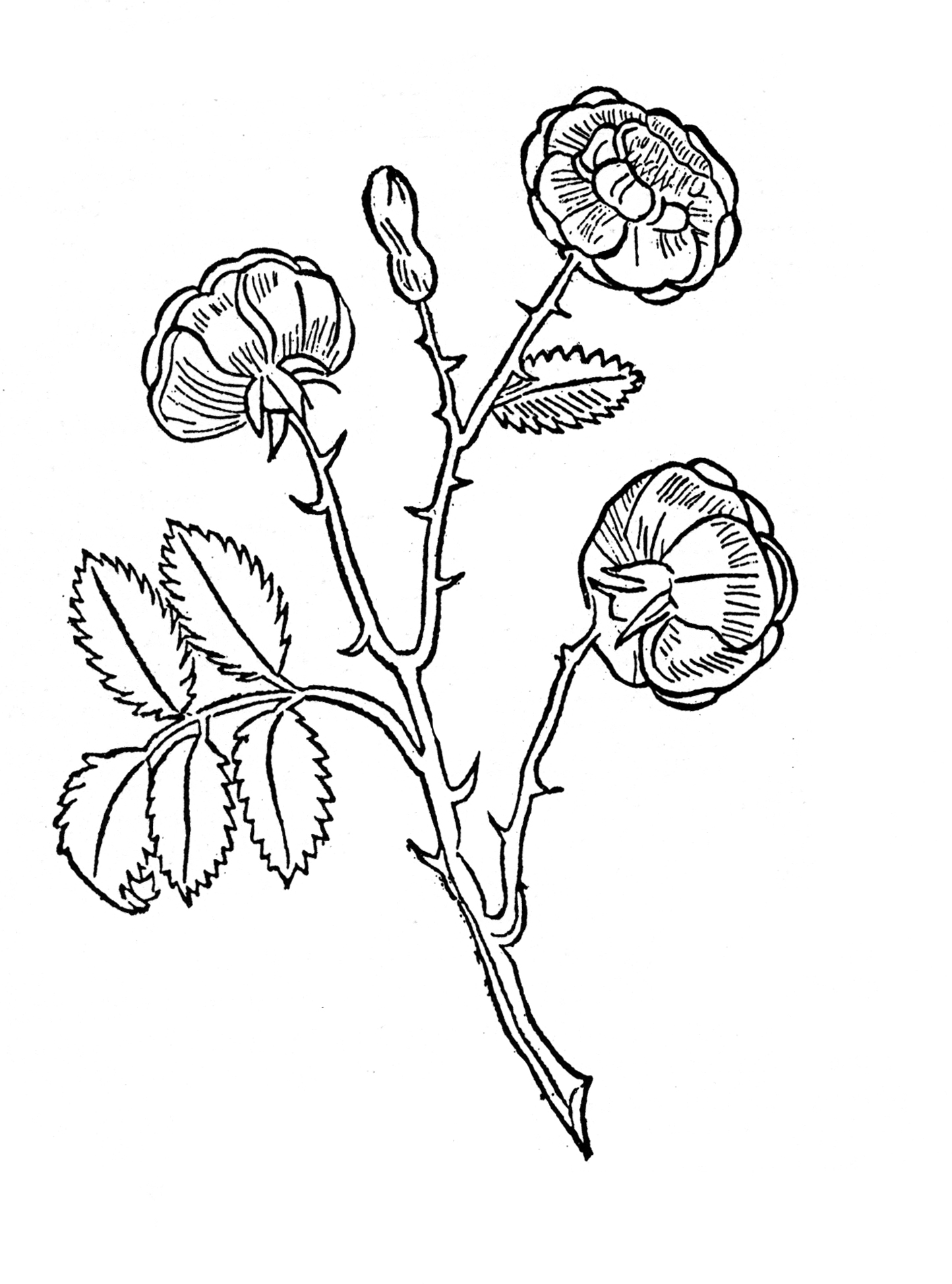
Chapter 337. Rosa – rosen

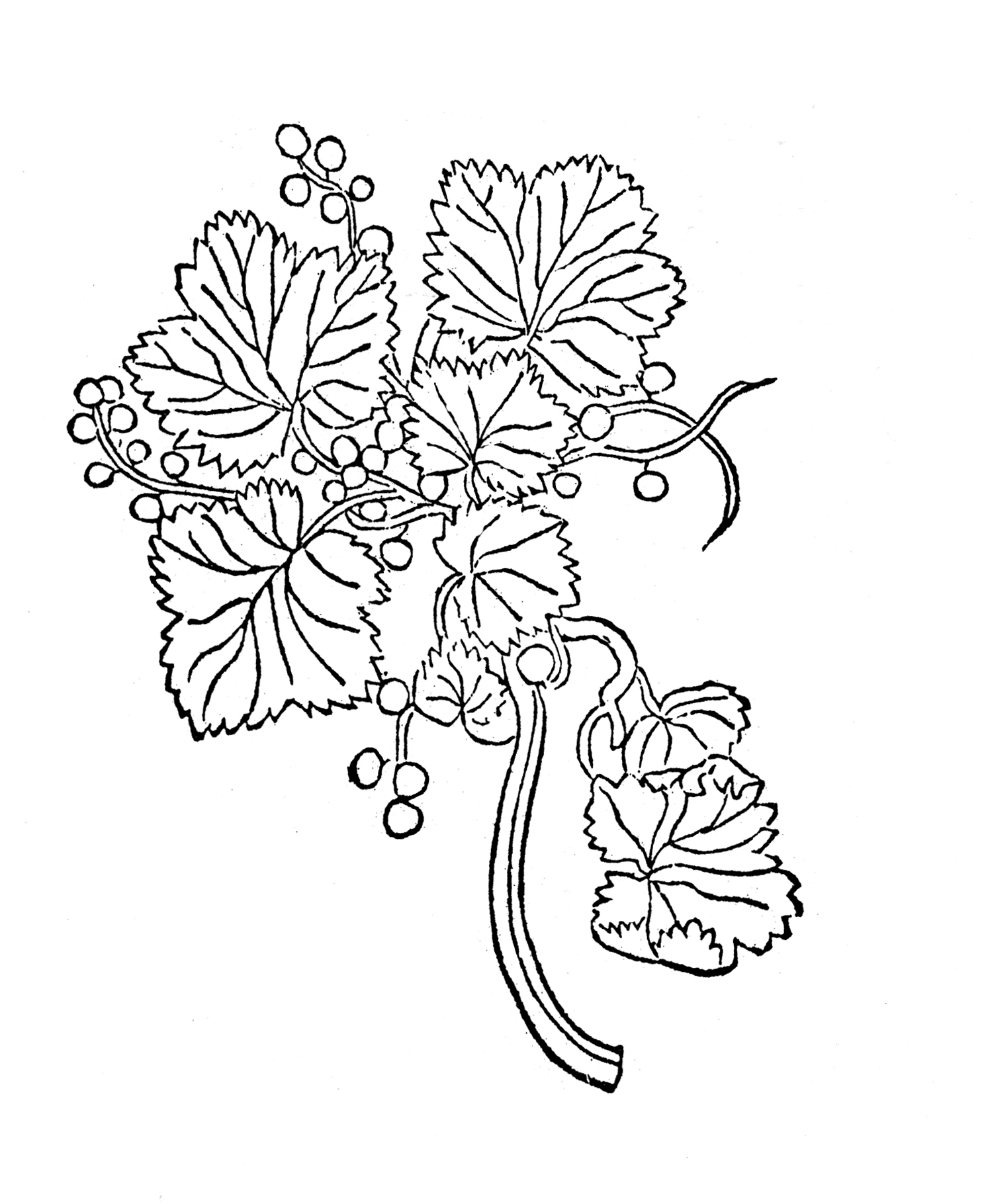
Chapter 341. Ribes – iohans drubelin

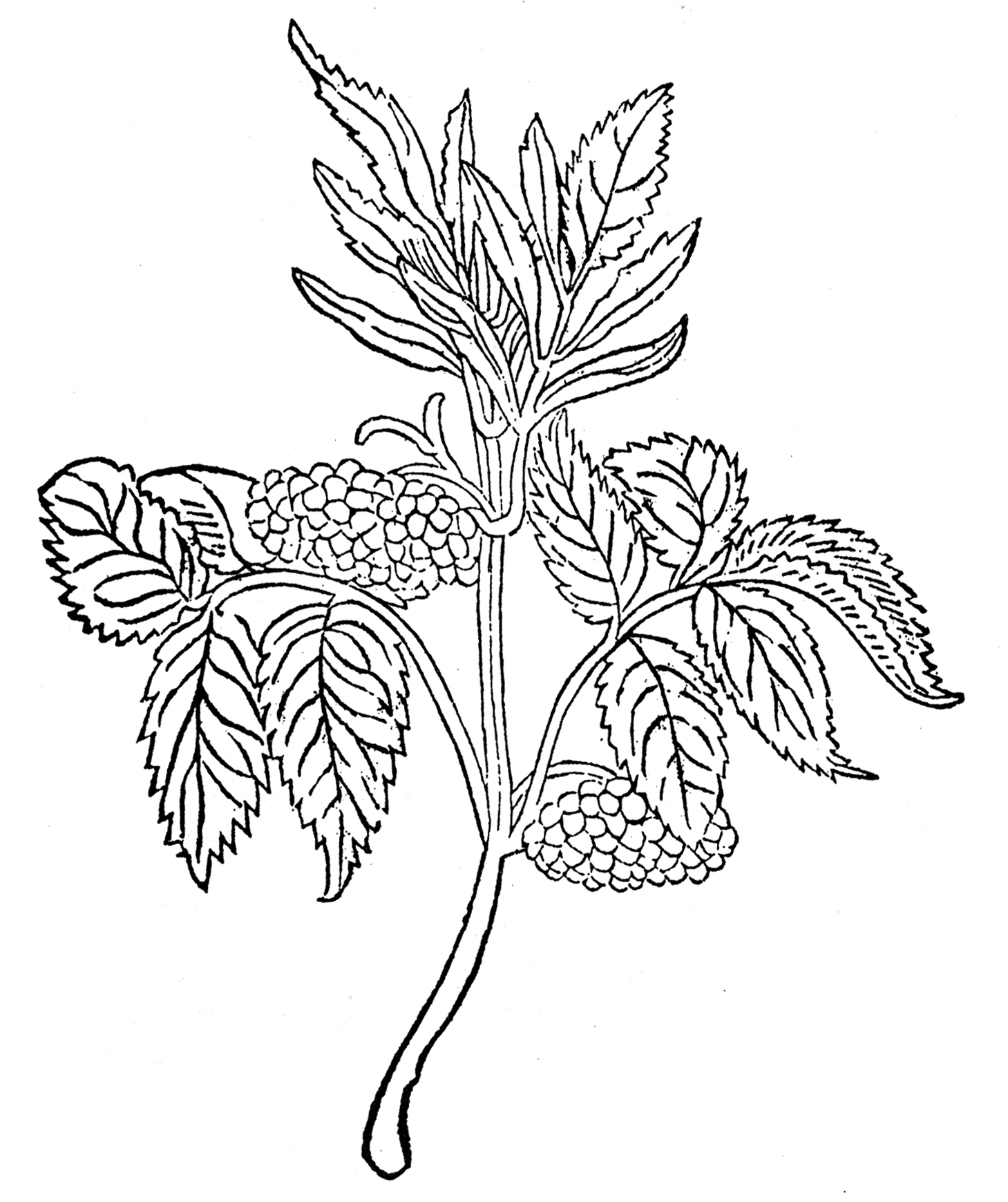
Chapter 346. Sambucus – holler

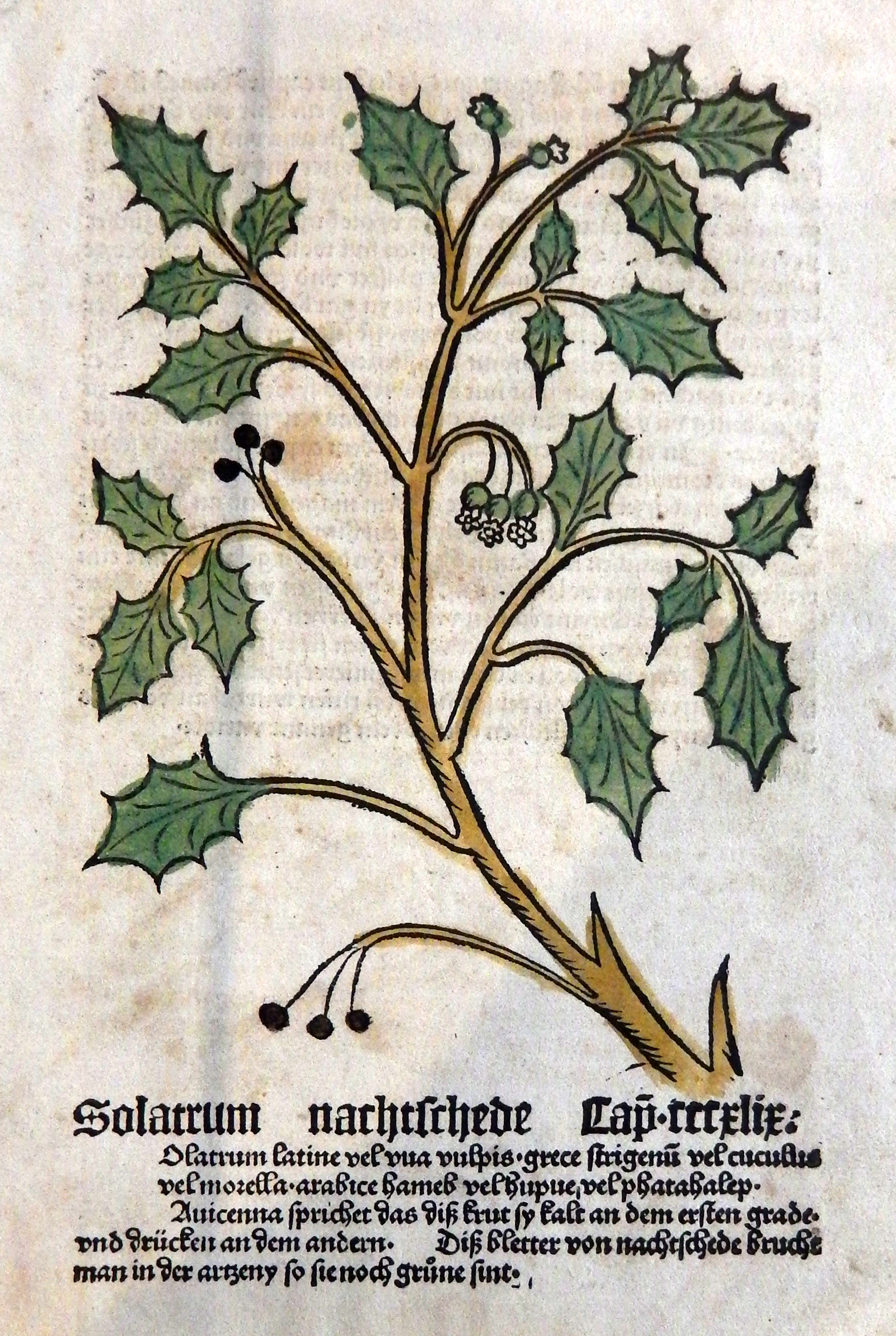
Chapter 349. Solatrum – nachtschede

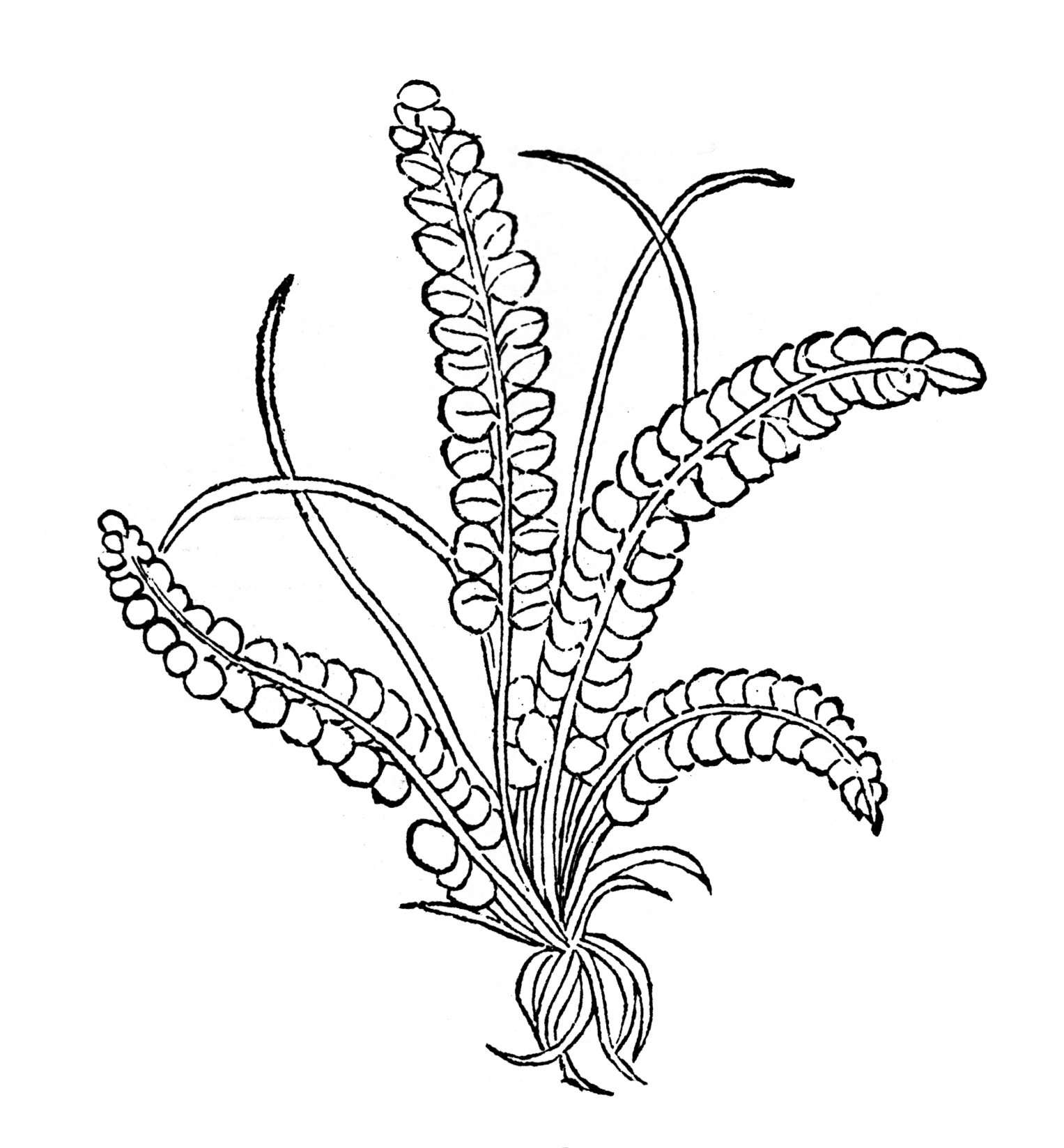
Chapter 354. Saxifraga – stein brech

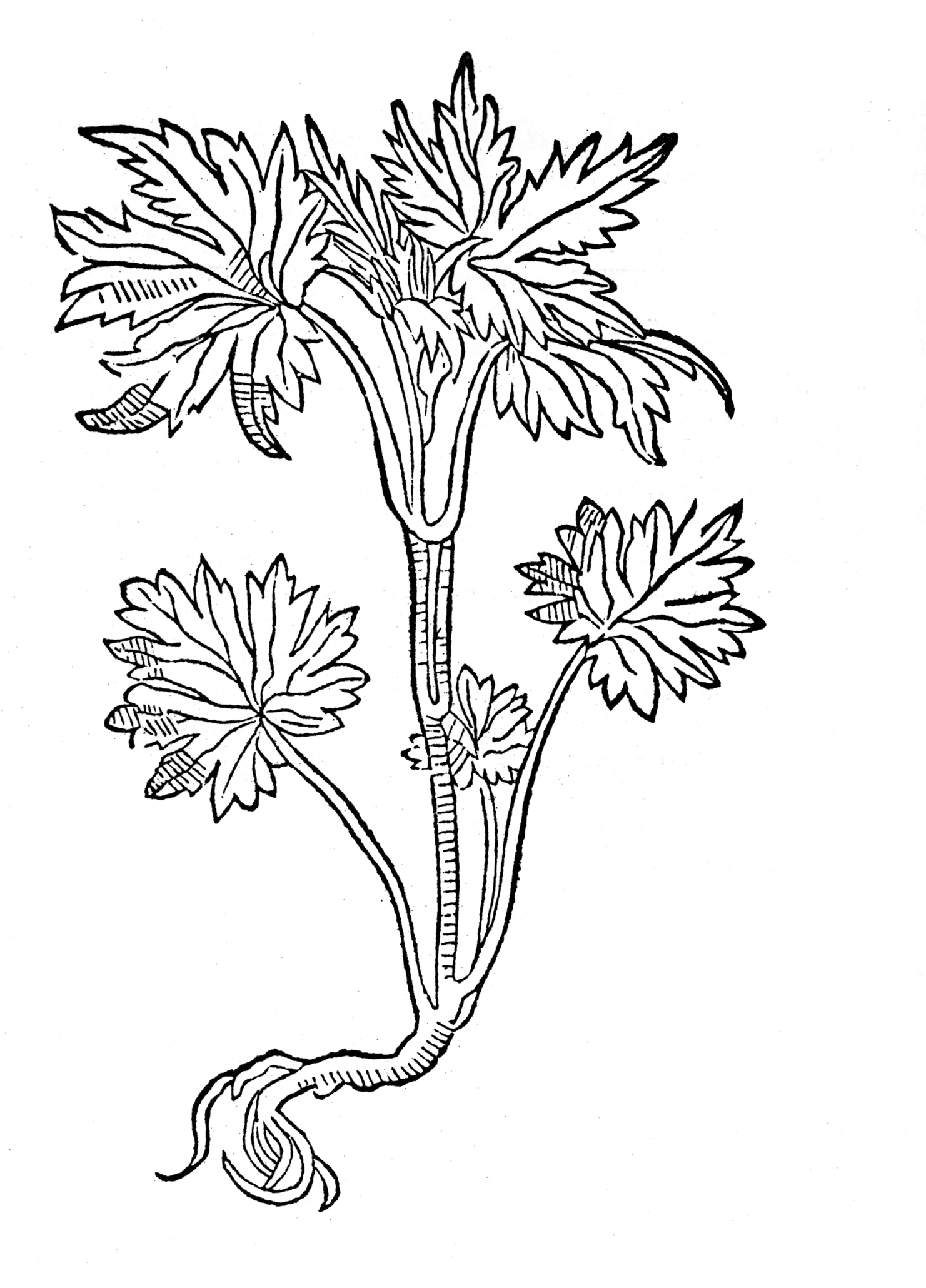
Chapter 359. Stafisagria – byszmyntz oder luszkrut

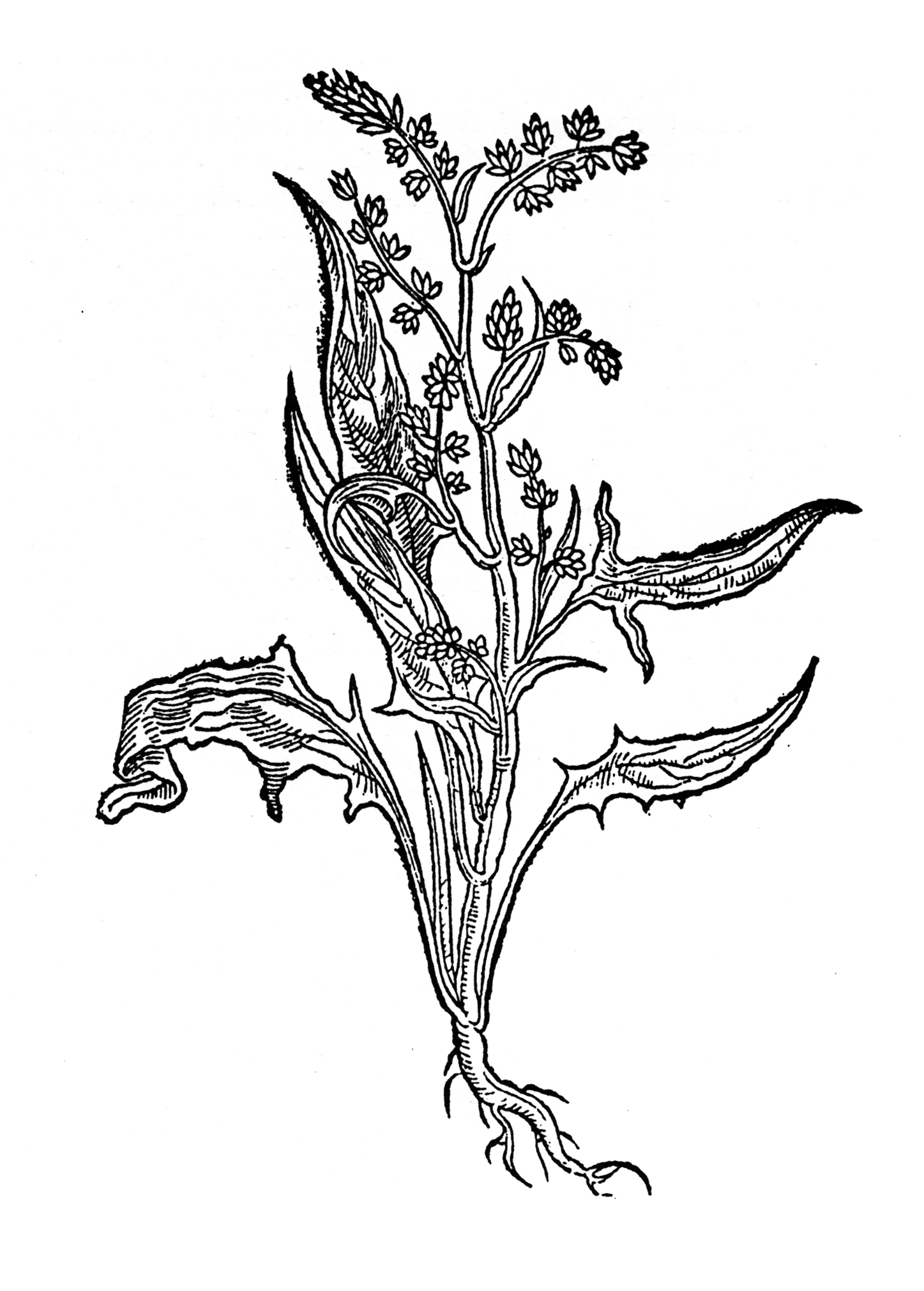
Chapter 364. Spinachia – benetz

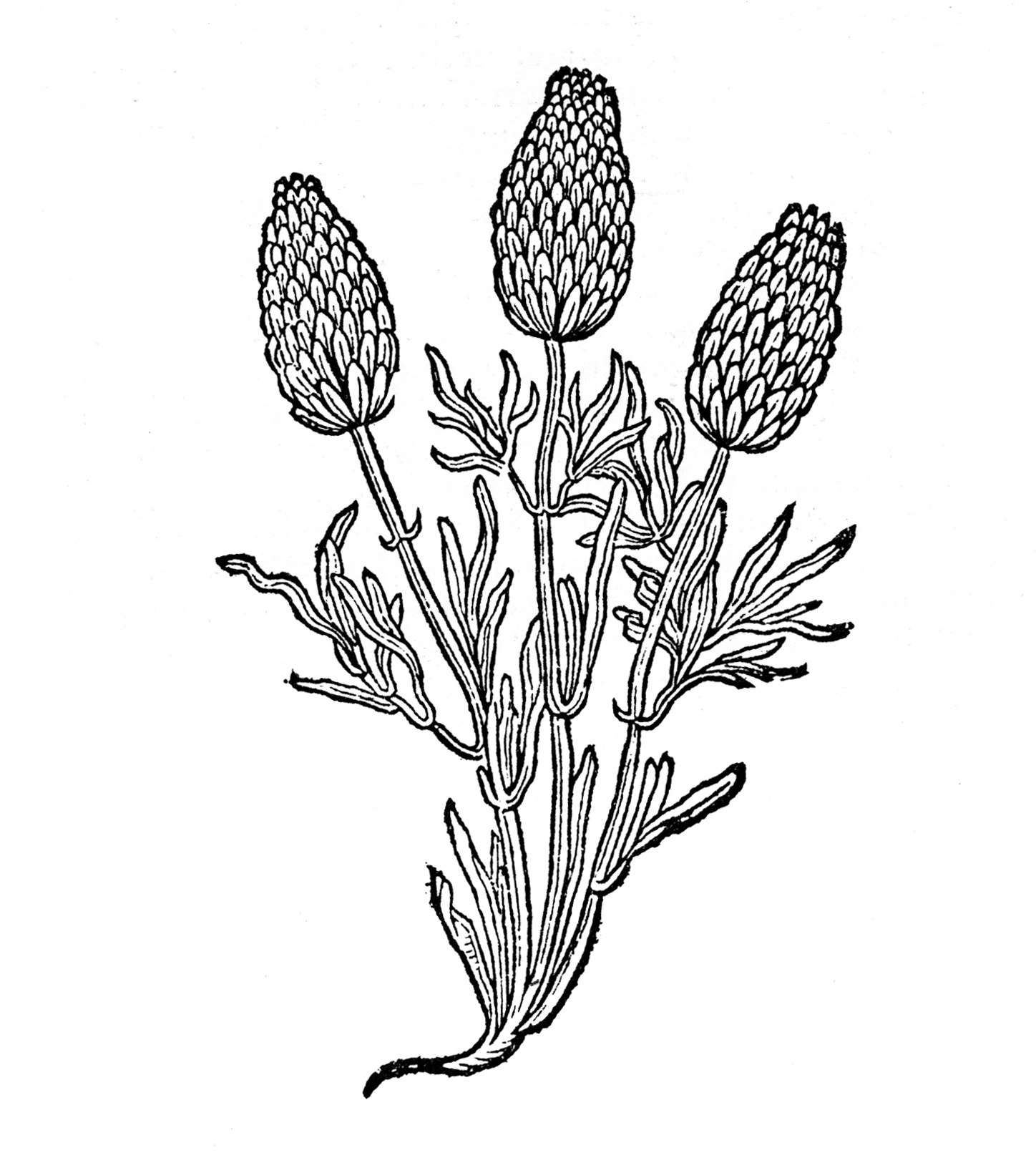
Chapter 366. Sticados arabicum – blumen von arabien

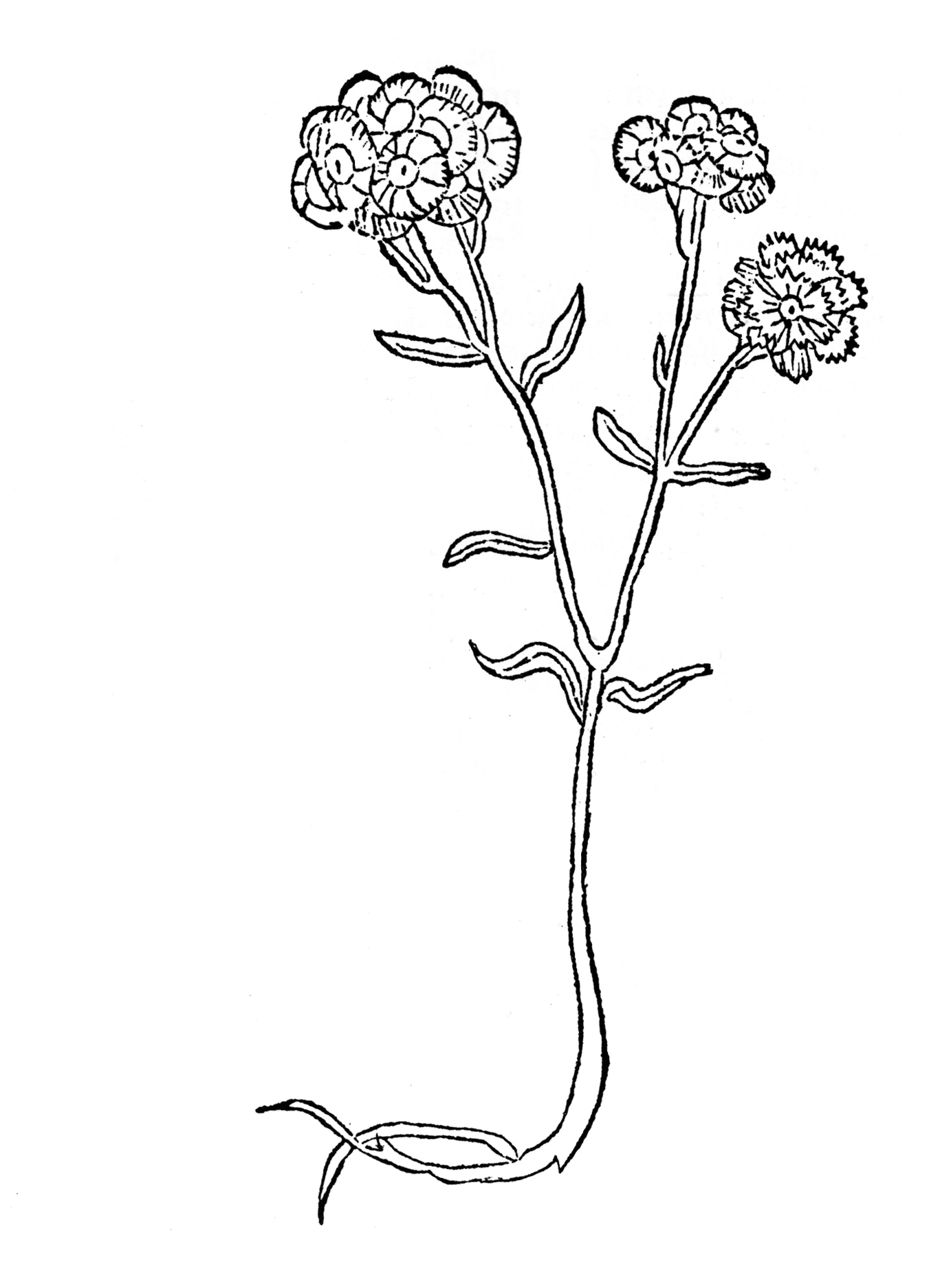
Chapter 367. Sticados citrinum heyssent – rynblumen oder motten krut

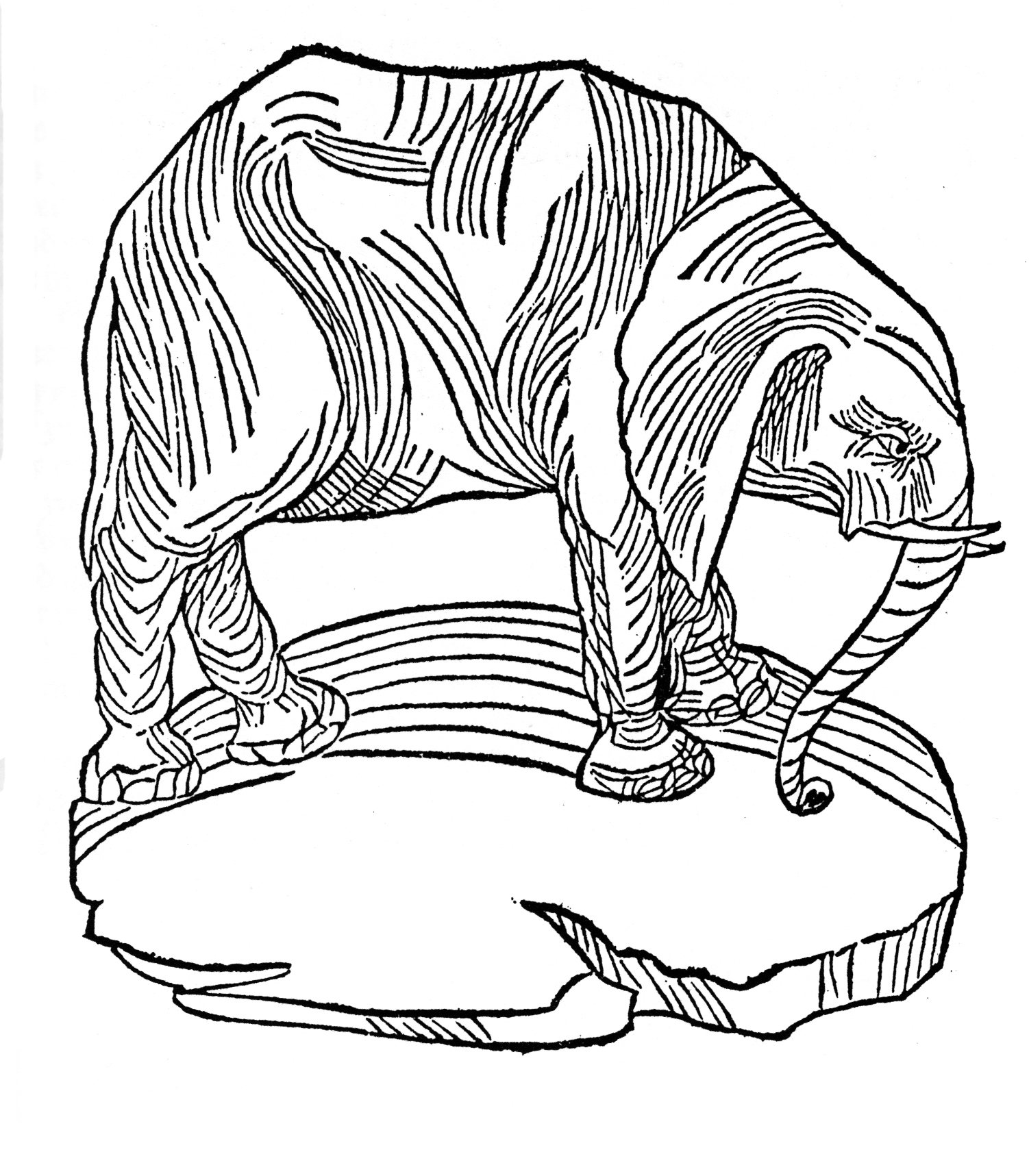
Chapter 371. Spodium – gebrant helfen beyn

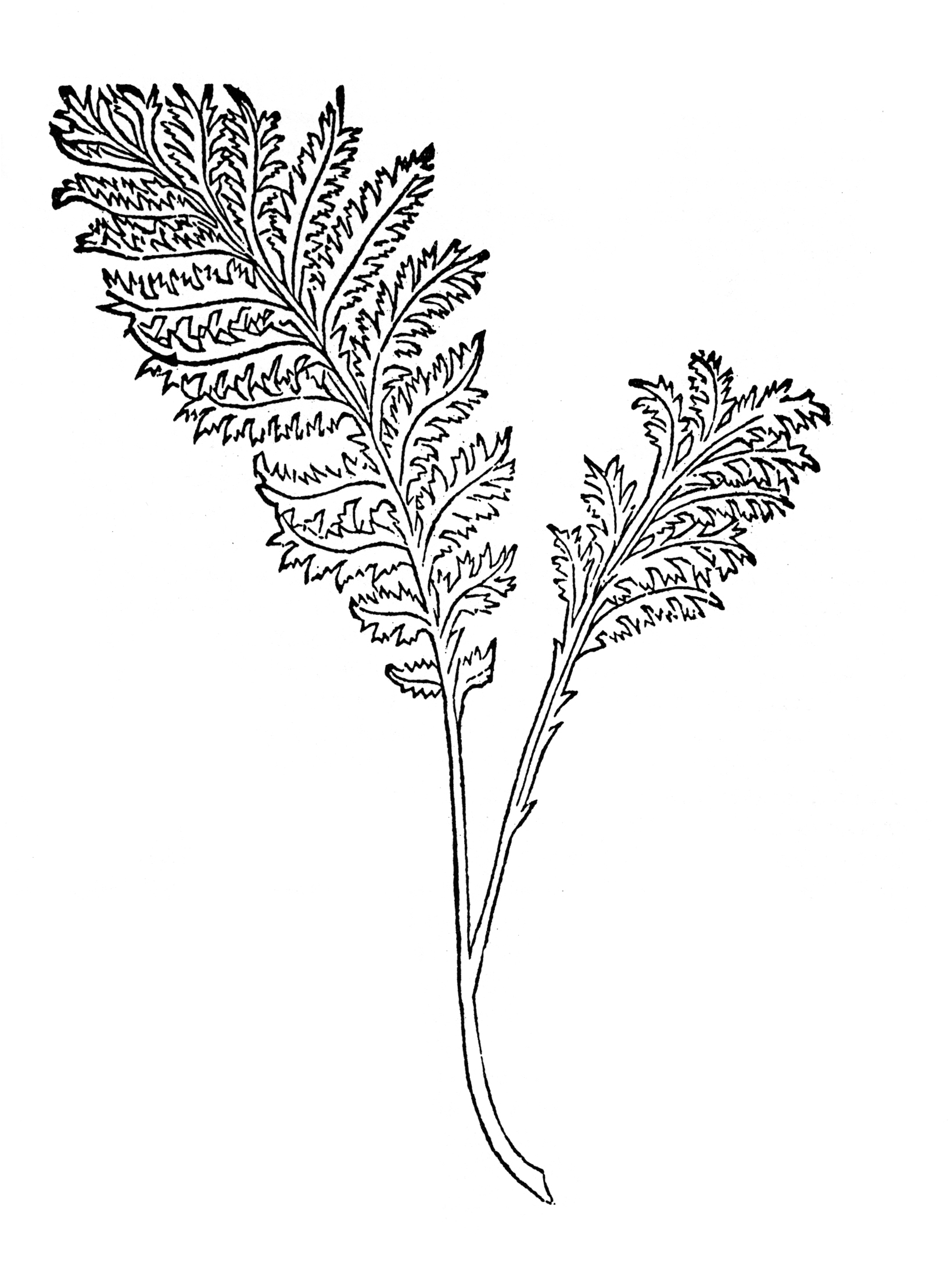
Chapter 399. Tanacetum – reinfar

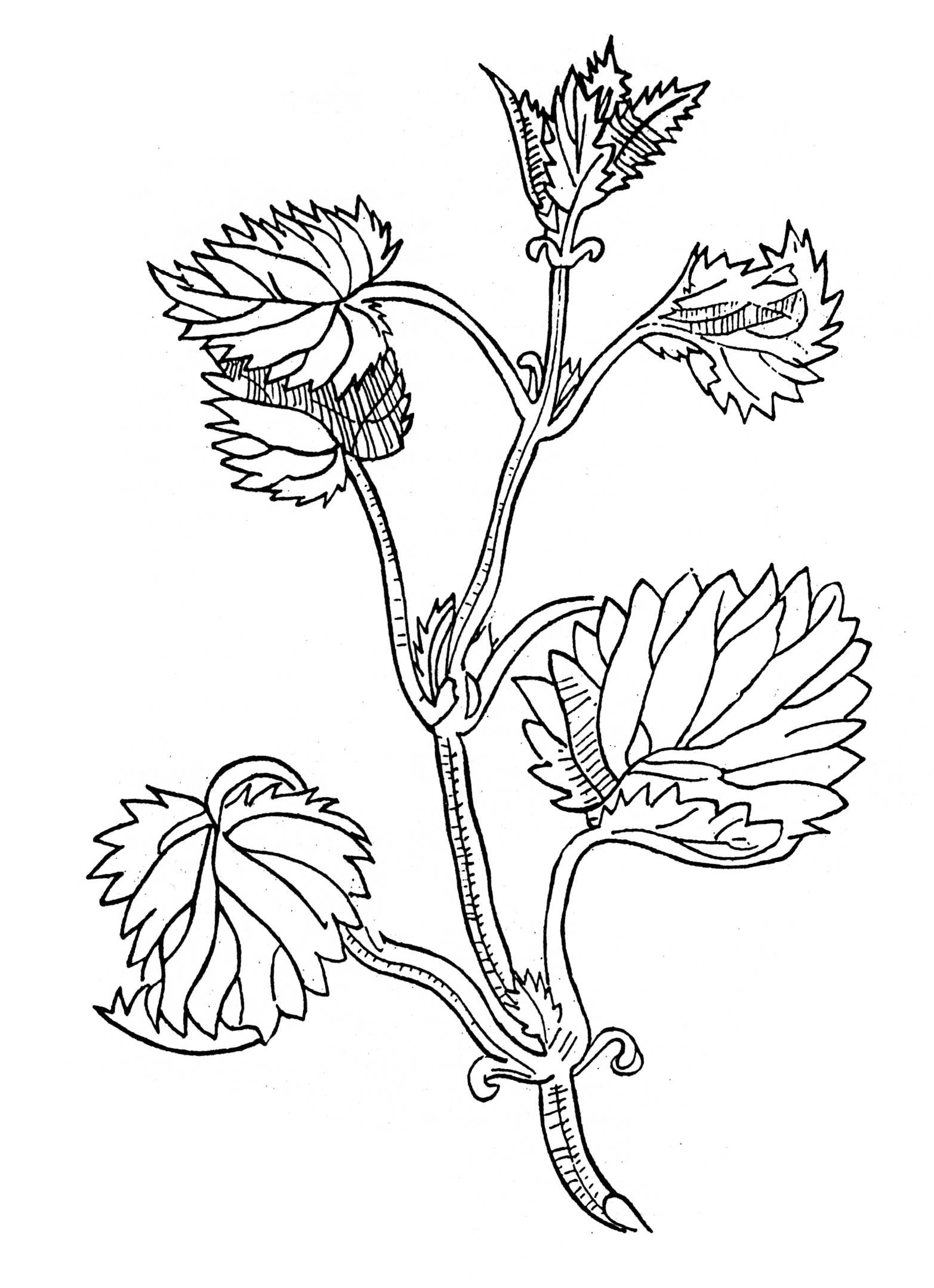
Chapter 410. Urtica – nesseln

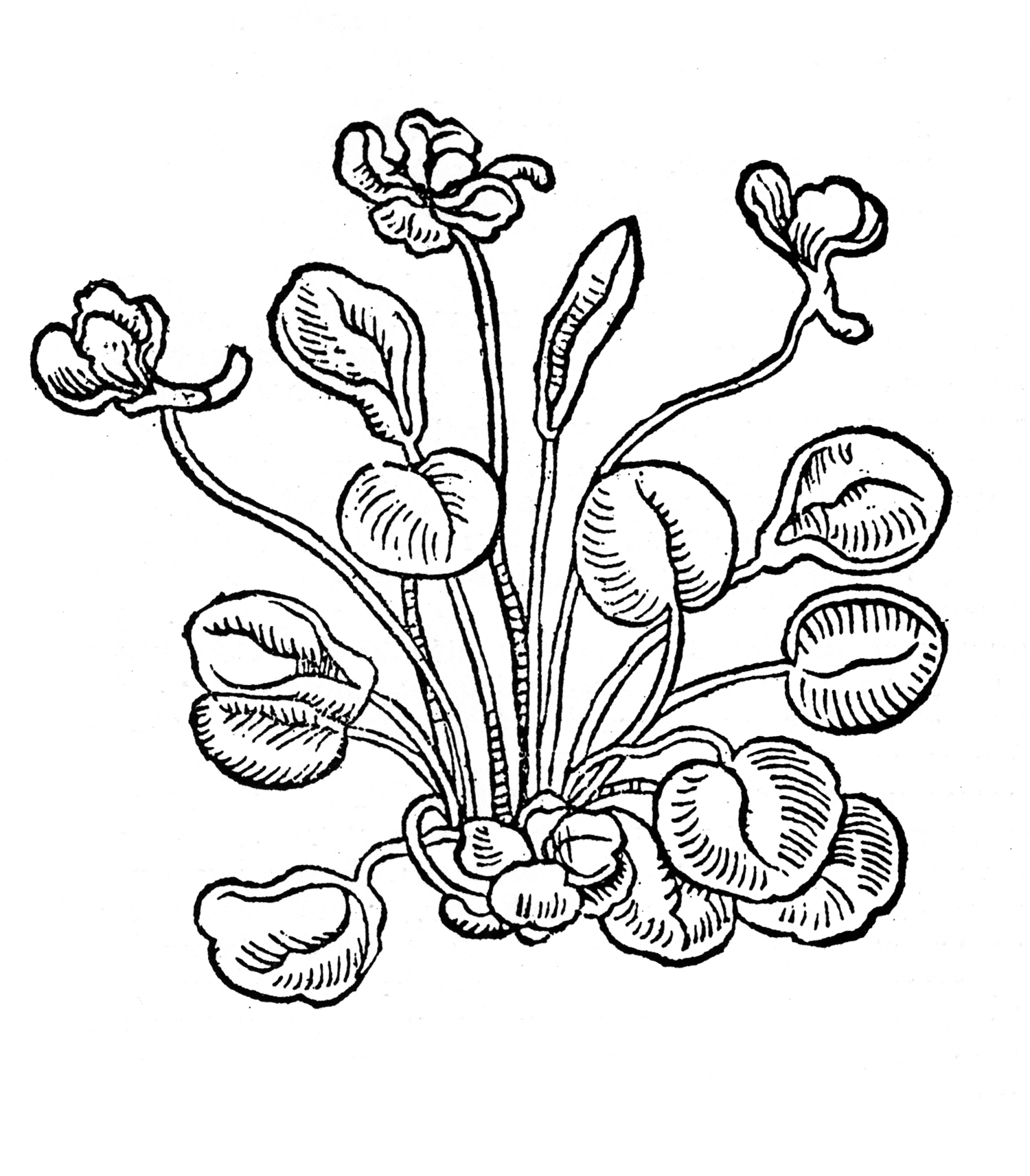
Chapter 413. Viola heyssent – violen

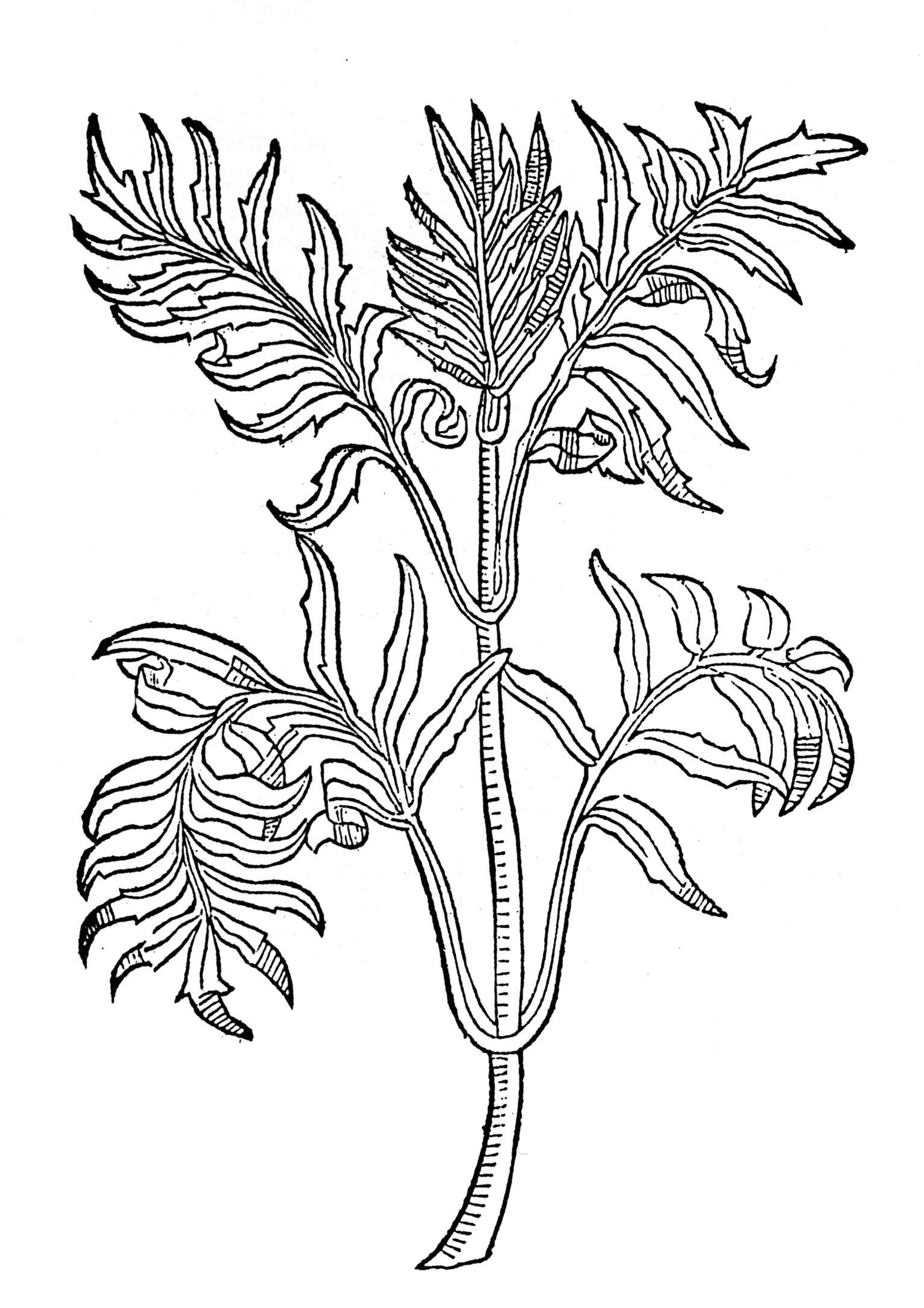
Chapter 415. Valeriana vel fu – baldrian

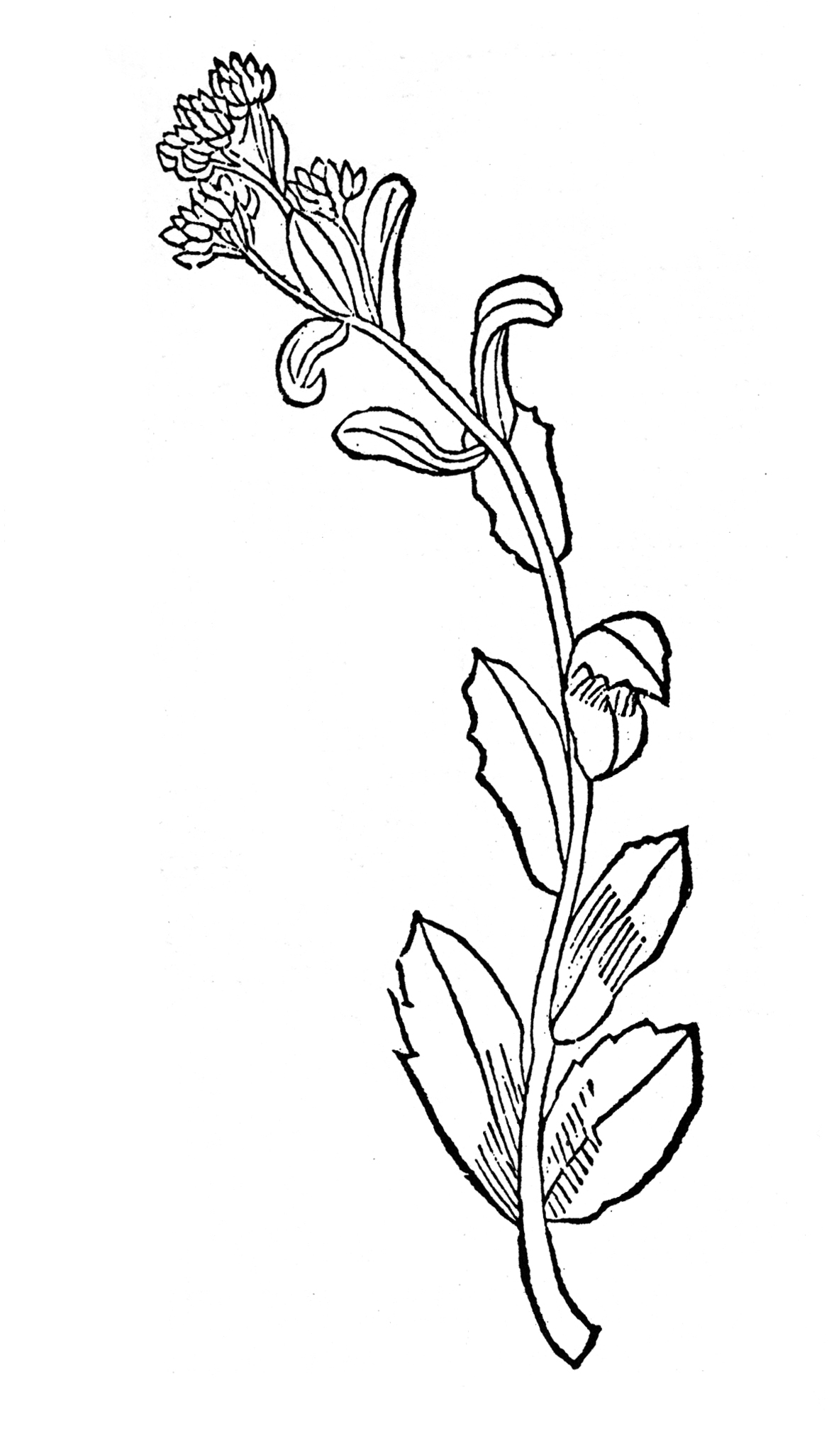
Chapter 417. Vermicularis – muer pfeffer oder duben kropf

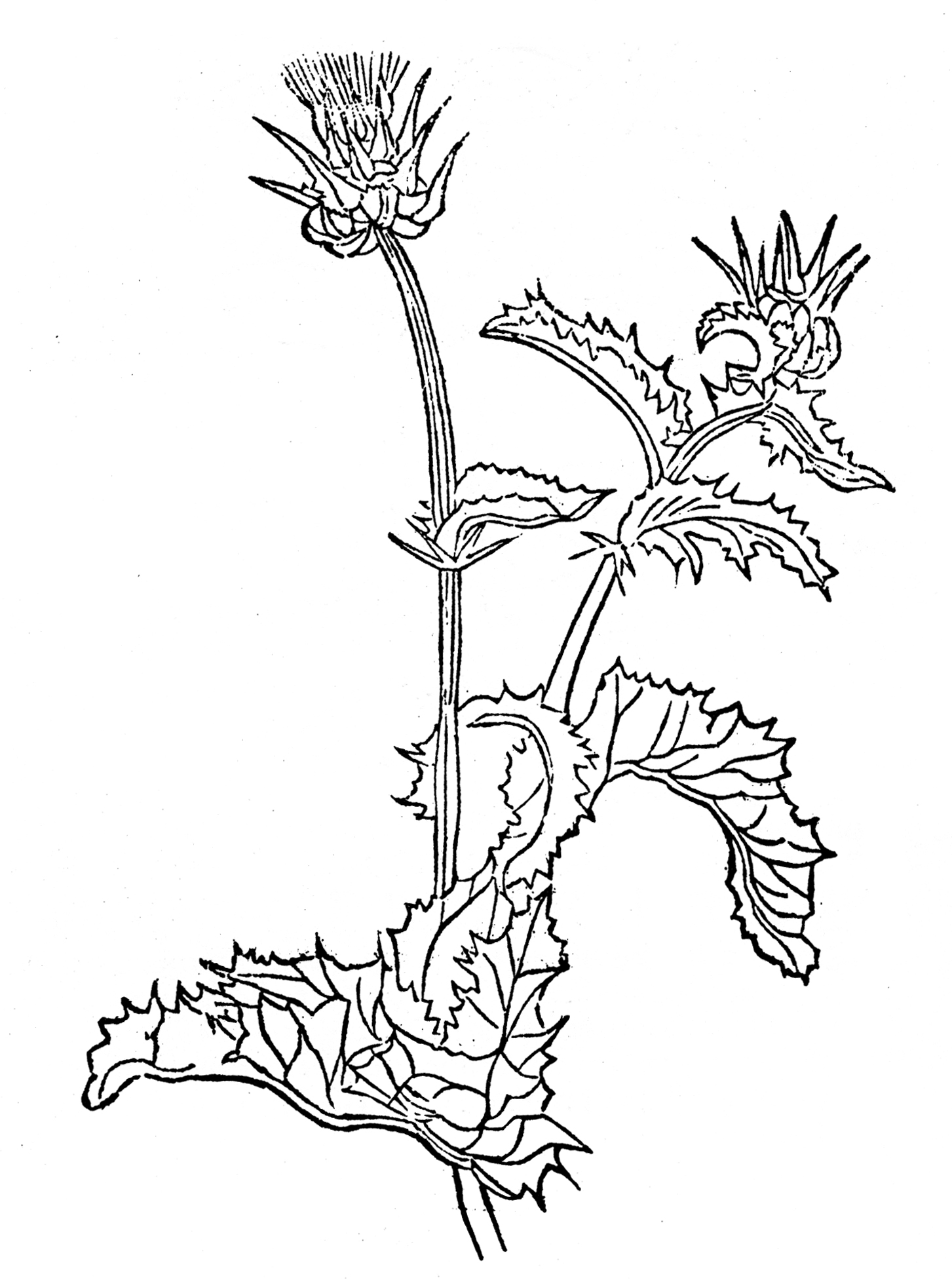
Carduus marianus. Incorrectly assigned to chapter 429 Yringus – krusz distel

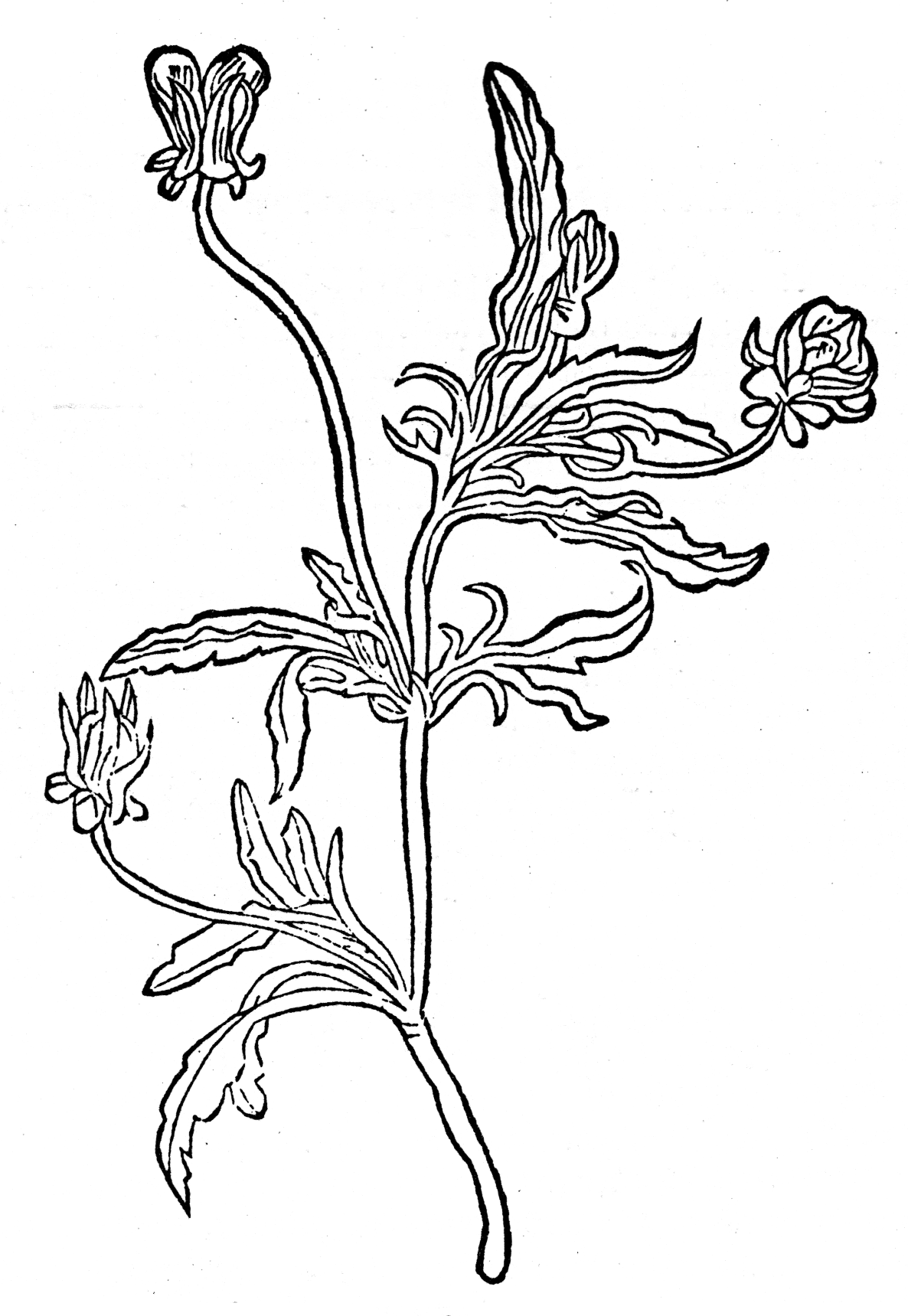
Chapter 432. Yacea – freyschem krut

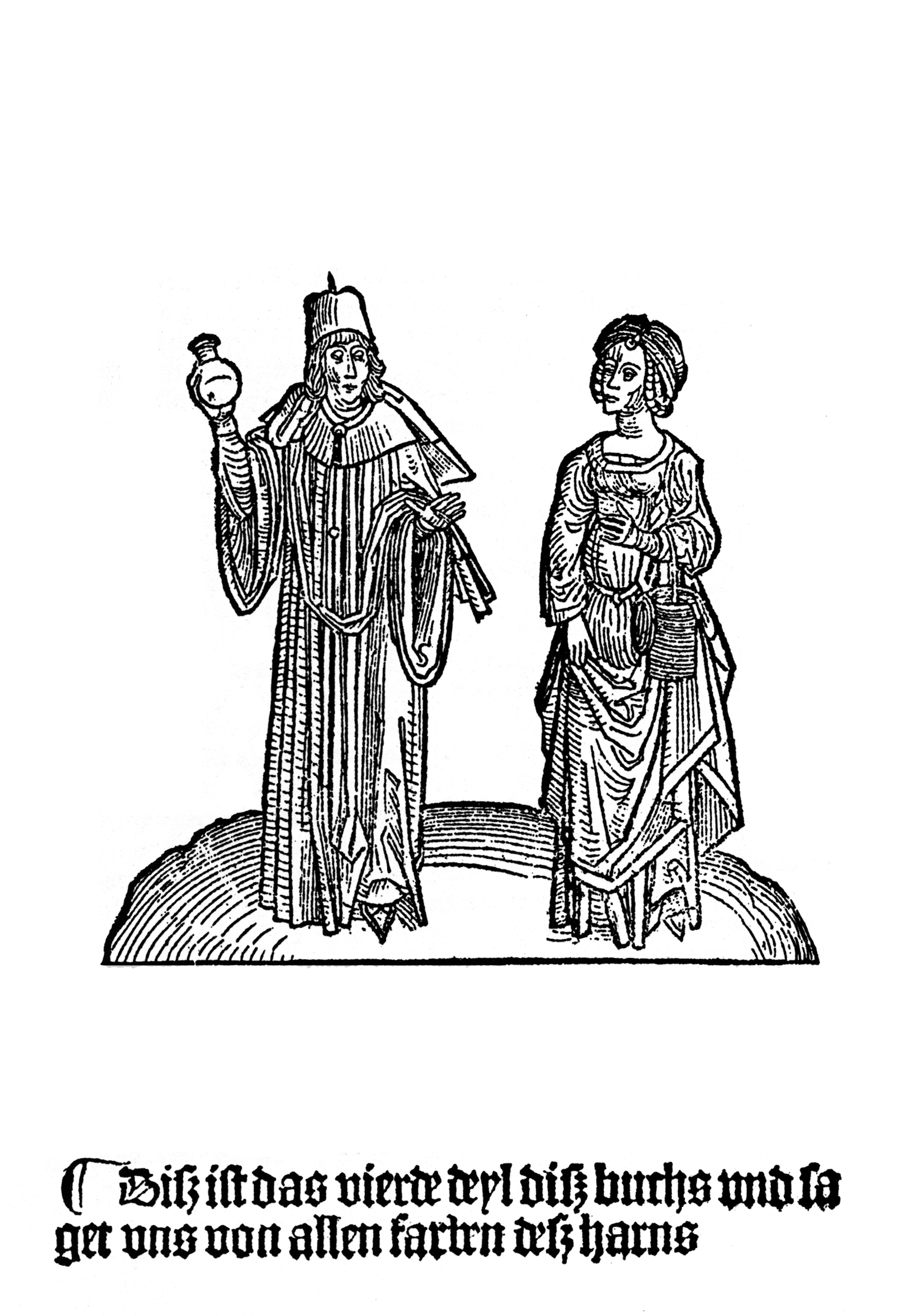
Harnschau

== Editions ==
- Mainz (Peter Schöffer) March, 28. 1485 (Digitalisat)
- Augsburg (Hans Schönsperger?) August, 22. 1485 (Digitalisat)
- Strasbourg 1485
- Basel 1486
- Augsburg (Hans Schönsberger) June, 5. 1486 (Digitalisat)
- Augsburg (Hans Schönsberger) March, 7. 1487
- Ulm (Conrad Dinckmut) March, 31. 1487 (Digitalisat)
- Straßburg 1487 (Digitalisat)
- Straßburg 1488 (Digitalisat)
- Augsburg (Hans Schönsberger) December, 15. 1488 (Digitalisat)
- Lübeck (Arends) 1492
- Augsburg (Hans Schönsberger) August, 13. 1493 (Digitalisat)
- Augsburg (Hans Schönsberger) May, 10. 1496 (Digitalisat)
- Augsburg (Hans Schönsberger) May, 13. 1499
- Straßburg (Johann Prüß) 1507 (Digitalisat)
- Straßburg (R. Beck) 1515 (Digitalisat)
