= List of Chinese terrestrial ungulates =

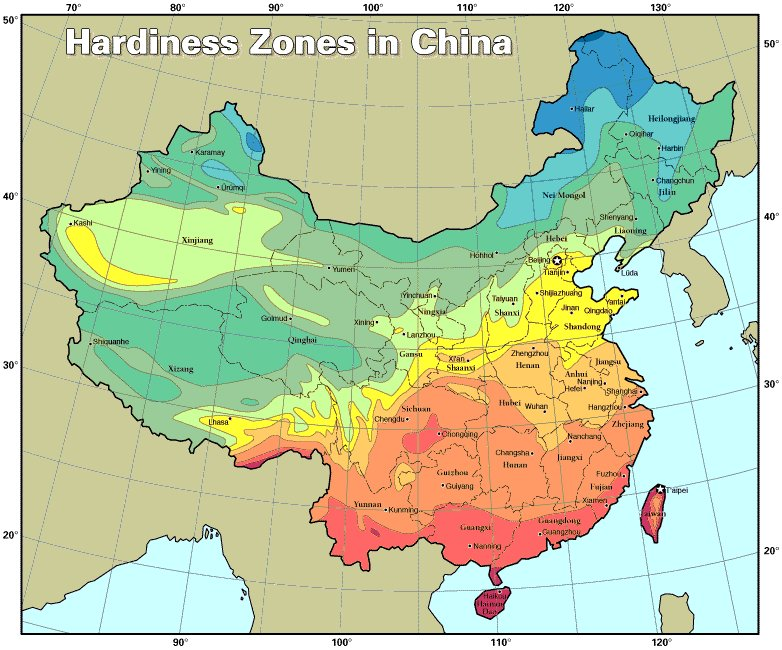
China hardiness map, giving some indication of the ecological zone diversity of modern China. Over the past, global climatic change has wrought many changes over the centuries and millennia.

This is a list of Chinese terrestrial ungulates, including both extinct and extant types.

Ungulates are mammals which are endothermic amniote animals distinguished from reptiles and birds by the possession of hair, (Note: With a few exceptions, all of them cetaceans.) three middle ear bones, mammary glands, and a neocortex (a region of the brain). The mammalian brain regulates body temperature and the circulatory system, including the four-chambered heart. The mammals include the largest animals on the planet, the rorquals and some other whales, as well as some of the most intelligent, such as elephants, some primates and some cetaceans. The basic body type is a four-legged land-borne animal, but some mammals are adapted for life at sea, in the air, in the trees, or on two legs. The largest group of mammals, the placentals, have a placenta which feeds the offspring during pregnancy.

China for the purposes of this list article refers to a collection of geographic and ecological areas, now primarily politically identified with a modern nation state. Written records of the history of China can be found from as early as 1200 BC under the Shang dynasty (c. 1700–1046 BC). Ancient historical texts such as the Records of the Grand Historian (c. 100 BC) and the Bamboo Annals describe a Xia dynasty (c. 2100–1700 BC). The Yellow River is said to be the cradle of Chinese civilization, although cultures originated at various regional centers along both the Yellow River and the Yangtze River valleys millennia ago in the Neolithic era.

According to the science of biological taxonomy, ungulates divide into different taxonomic or cladistic sub-categories. The 2 relevant to this list article are odd- and even-toed ungulates. Non-terrestrial species may be considered elsewhere. This list includes both domesticated species and the wildlife of China.

Human uses in China for the terrestrial ungulates include food from flesh or milk, fuel from dung, cloth and leather from hair (or, wool) and hide, religious expression, draft animals for carriage, battle technology, subjects of plastic, graphic, written, and spoken art.

== Even-toed ==
The even-toed ungulates (order Artiodactyla) are ungulates (hoofed animals) whose weight is borne approximately equally by the third and fourth toes, rather than mostly or entirely by the third as in odd-toed ungulates (perissodactyls), such as horses. The name Artiodactyla comes from (Greek: ἄρτιος (ártios), "even", and δάκτυλος (dáktylos), "finger/toe"), so the name "even-toed" is a translation of the description. This group includes pigs, peccaries, hippopotamuses, camels, llamas, chevrotains (mouse deer), deer, giraffes, pronghorn, antelopes, goat-antelopes (which include sheep, goats and others), and cattle. The group excludes the related group of whales (Cetacea). Of the roughly 220 artiodactyl species, many are of great dietary, economic, and cultural importance to humans.

=== Bovidae ===
Bovids include antelopes, goat-antelopes (which include sheep, goats and others), and cattle. In China, this has included antelopes, gazelles, and other; cattle; goats; and, sheep:

==== Subfamily Antilopinae ====
Includes antelopes, gazelles, and other species which are difficult to classify under the other subfamilies:

===== Genus Gazella =====
- Goitered gazelle (Gazella subgutturosa)

===== Genus Pantholops =====
- Tibetan antelope (Pantholops hodgsonii)

===== Genus Procapra =====
- Zeren (Procapra gutturosa)
- Goa (Procapra picticaudata)
- Przewalski's gazelle (Procapra przewalskii)

===== Genus Saiga =====
- Saiga antelope (Saiga tatarica)

==== Subfamily Bovinae ====
===== Genus Bos =====
- Gaur (Bos frontalis)
- Yak (Bos grunniens)

==== Subfamily Caprinae ====
Includes sheep and goats:

===== Genus Budorcas =====
- Takin (Budorcas taxicolor)

===== Genus: Capra =====
- Siberian ibex (Capra sibrica)

===== Genus: Hemitragus =====
- Himalayan tahr (Hemitragus jemlahicus)

===== Genus: Nemorhaedus =====
- Mainland serow (Nemorhaedus sumatraensis)
- Red goral (Nemorhaedus baileyi)
- Long-tailed goral (Nemorhaedus caudatus)
- Himalayan goral (Naemorhedus goral)
- Chinese goral (Naemorhedus griseus)

===== Genus: Ovis =====
- Argali (Ovis ammon)

===== Genus: Pseudois =====
- Bharal (Pseudois nayaur)
- Dwarf blue sheep (Pseudois schaeferi)

=== Camels ===
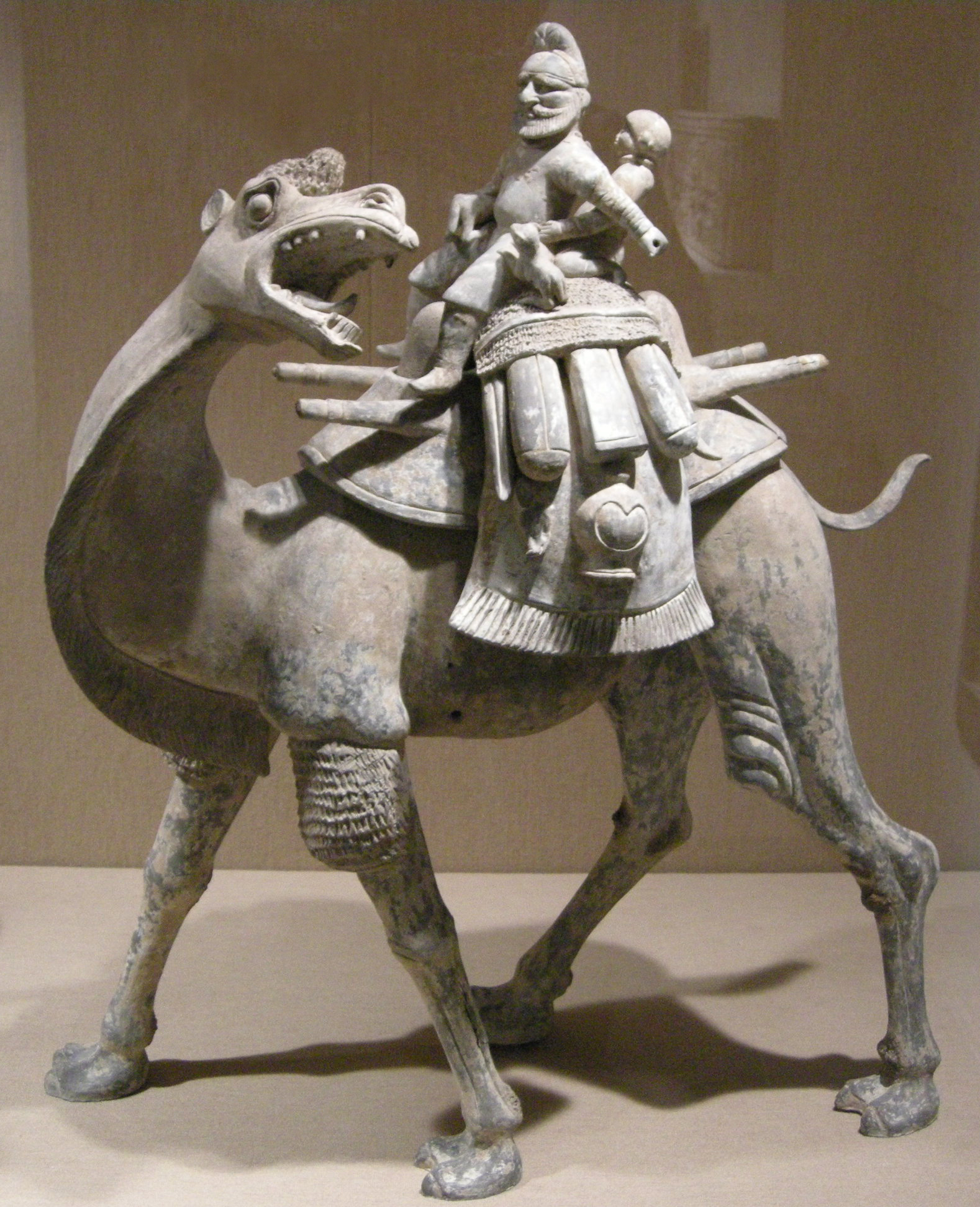
Camel and rider, Tang dynasty. Historically camels were often associated with bringing exotic persons and goods into China.

Camels are a type of even-toed ungulate of the genus Camelus, bearing distinctive fatty deposits known as "humps" on their back. The two surviving species of camel are the dromedary, one-humped camel (C. dromedarius) of Middle East and Horn of Africa; and the bactrian, or two-humped camel (C. bactrianus) of Central Asia. Both have been domesticated, and have provided camel milk, meat, camel hair for textiles, and have served as riding mounts and carriage animals, in war and in peace.

- Bactrian camel, 2-humped camel native to Central Asia, historically an exotic species for most of China

=== Deer types ===
Deer (Cervidae and related, true deer and musk deer) were historically important in China; they include:

==== Subfamily Cervinae ====
===== Genus Cervus =====
- Central Asian red deer (Cervus affinis)
- Red deer (Cervus elaphus), one of the largest deer species, historically important in art, includes subspecies:
  - Bactrian deer (Cervus elaphus bactrianus)
  - Yarkand deer (Cervus elaphus yarkandenis)
- Elk (also known as wapiti) (Cervus canadensis), includes 4 subspecies:
  - Alashan wapiti
  - Altai wapiti
  - Tian Shan wapiti
  - Manchurian wapiti
- Thorold's deer (Cervus albirostris)
- Sika deer (Cervus nippon), includes subspecies:
  - North China sika deer (also known as Mandarin sika deer (Cervus nippon mandarinus), known for its prominent spots
- Eld's deer (Cervus eldii)
- Sambar deer (Cervus unicolor), large deer found in the south

===== Genus Elaphurus =====
- Père David's deer (Elaphurus davidianus)

===== Genus Axis =====
- Hog deer (Axis porcinus)

==== Subfamily Hydropotinae ====
===== Genus Hydropotes =====
- Water deer (Hydropotes inermis)

==== Subfamily Muntiacinae ====
===== Genus Elaphodus =====
- Tufted deer (Elaphodus cephalophus)

===== Genus Muntiacus =====
- Hairy-fronted muntjac (Muntiacus crinifrons)
- Fea's muntjac (Muntiacus feae)
- Gongshan muntjac (Muntiacus gongshanensis)
- Indian muntjac (Muntiacus muntjak)
- Reeves's muntjac (Muntiacus reevesi)

==== Subfamily Capreolinae ====
===== Genus Alces =====
- Moose (Alces alces), the largest Chinese deer standing to 2 m tall and weighing up to 700 kg

===== Genus Capreolus =====
- Siberian roe deer (Capreolus pygargus)

==== Musk deer ====
Musk deer are in the genus Moschus the only extant genus of the family Moschidae, represented by seven extant species, most or all with ranges in or including China. They lack antlers and facial glands, and possess only a single pair of teats, a gall bladder, a caudal gland, a pair of tusk-like teeth and—of particular economic importance to humans—a musk gland. To obtain their musk, the deer is killed and its musk gland removed and dried. The reddish-brown paste turns into a black granular material, which is used in alcohol solution. One kilogram (2.2 lb) of musk grains requires 30 - 50 deer, which together with their high demand for perfumes and medicines makes musk tinctures highly expensive. Notable species of musk deer, in modern China are:

- Alpine musk deer (Moschus chrysogaster), occurs in the highlands of central China, south and west to the Himalayas
- Anhui musk deer (Moschus anhuiensis)
- Black musk deer or dusky musk deer (Moschus fuscus)
- Dwarf musk deer or Chinese forest musk deer (Moschus berezovskii)
- Siberian musk deer (Moschus moschiferus)
- White-bellied musk deer also known as Himalayan musk deer (Moschus leucogaster)

==== Tragulidae ====
Tragulidae or mouse-deer are very small, for deer types:

- Lesser mouse-deer, (Tragulus kanchil), found in Yunnan, to 45 cm height and 2 kg

=== Giraffes ===
Giraffes are native to Africa, not to China. However, they were notably brought as exhibits to the royal court, many centuries ago.

- Giraffe (Giraffa camelopardalis)

=== Pigs ===
Pigs (Suidae) have been long domesticated in China, and form an important cultural role. This includes:

- The domestic pig (Sus scrofa domesticus or Sus domesticus), often called swine or hog.

== Odd-toed ==
An odd-toed ungulate is a mammal with hooves that feature an odd number of toes on the rear feet. Odd-toed ungulates compose the order Perissodactyla (Greek: περισσός, perissós, "uneven", and δάκτυλος, dáktylos, "finger/toe"). The middle toe on each hind hoof is usually larger than its neighbours. Odd-toed ungulates are relatively large grazers and, unlike the ruminant even-toed ungulates (artiodactyls), they have relatively simple stomachs because they are hindgut fermenters, digesting plant cellulose in their intestines rather than in one or more stomach chambers. Odd-toed ungulates include the horse, tapirs, and rhinoceroses. Both horses and other equids and also rhinoceroses are well known as having a major presence in China. Although there is a Malayan tapir (Tapirus indicus), also called the Asian tapir, its present range is far south of China.

=== Equidae/horses ===
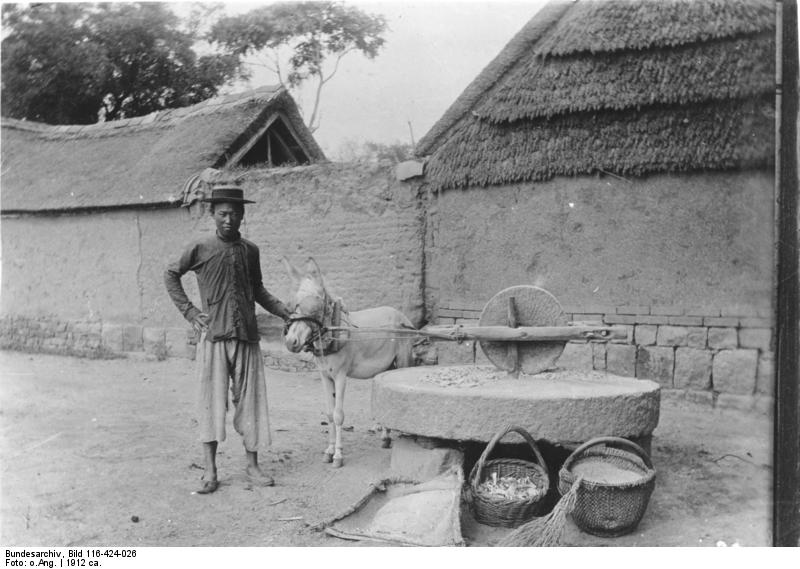
Image of donkey, Qingdao, China, 1912, illustrating the use of an equid in providing power to a milling process

Horses have long been a part of Chinese culture. In ancient times, there is evidence that they were uses as a food source. As domestication lead to breeding larger specimens, horses were used for drawing chariots, wagons, and later as mounts. Equids were used for both war and peace. Horses were a prestige species, and acquiring choice varieties was a major preoccupation of many Chinese dynasties.

- Domestic horse (Equus ferus caballus), a species which has historically formed a major part of Chinese culture
- Kiang (Equus kiang), also known as Tibetan wild ass, large wild ass native to the Tibetan Plateau
- Onager (Equus hemionus), also known as Asiatic wild ass, includes subspecies:
  - Mongolian wild ass (Equus hemionus hemionus)
  - Turkmenian kulan (Equus hemionus kulan)
- Przewalski's horse, a wild type of horse

=== Rhinoceroses ===
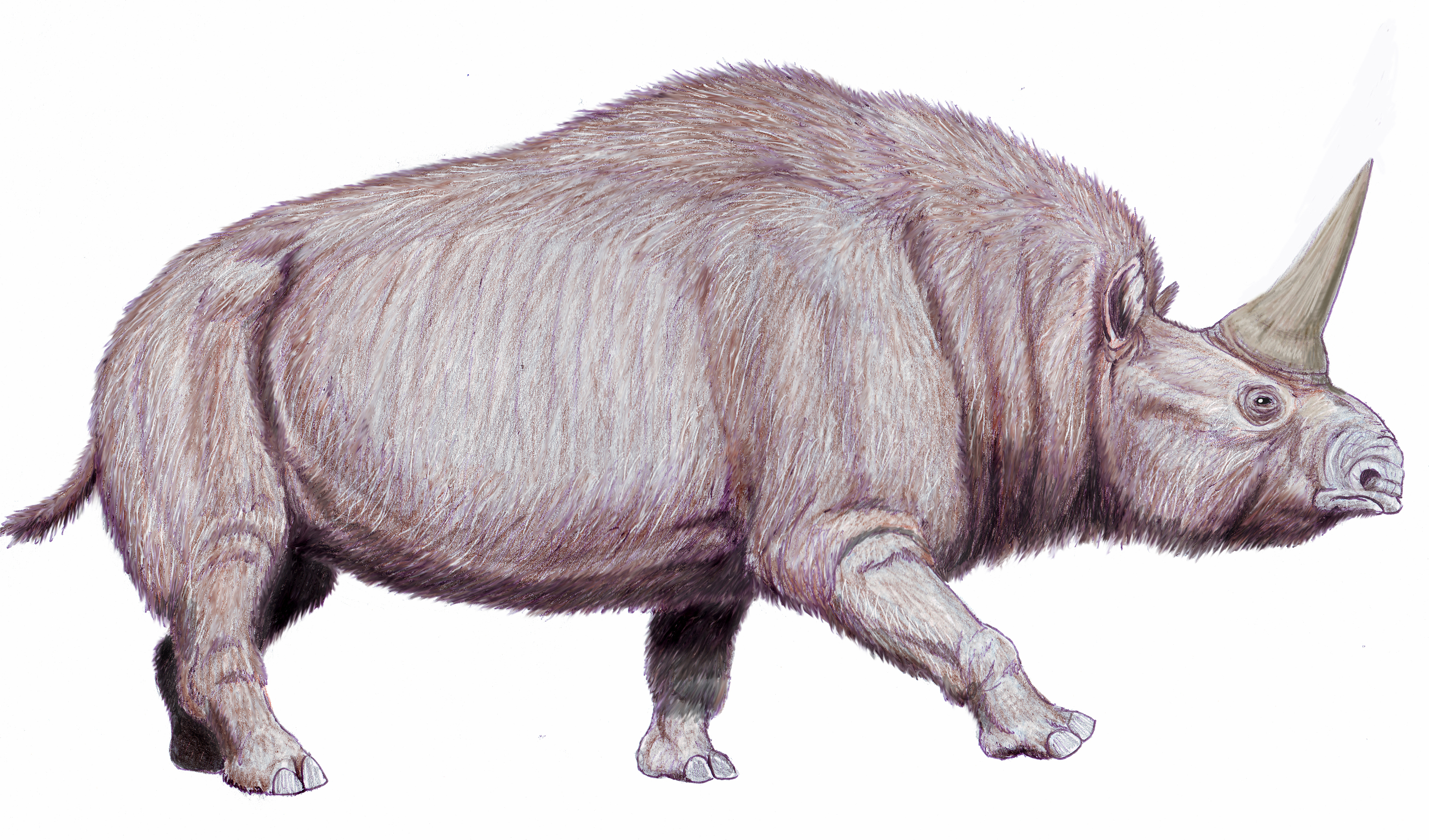
Artistic depiction of Elasmotherium, a type of rhinoceros, which appeared to have gone extinct around 50,000 years ago

Rhinoceroses are large, and have horns located in the center front of their heads. Rhinoceros horns are ground and used medicinally and in Chinese history the Chu warriors were known for using rhinoceros hide armor. The horns are made of keratin, of the protein type that makes up hair and fingernails. The Elasmotherium is an extinct species, although overlapping populations with humans, in prehistory. Three species are recognised. The best known, E. sibiricum was the size of a woolly mammoth and is thought to have had a large, thick horn on its forehead; which was used for defense, attracting mates, driving away competitors, sweeping snow from the grass in winter, and digging for water, and for extracting plant roots from their growth medium. Like all rhinoceroses, elasmotheres were herbivorous. Unlike any others, its high-crowned molars were ever-growing. Its legs were longer than those of other rhinos and were adapted for galloping, giving it a horse-like gait. 3 species of currently extant rhinoceros have been attested to have historically existed in China:

- Indian rhinoceros (Rhinoceros unicornis), named after its single horn, the largest of Asian rhinoceroses
- Vietnamese Javan rhinoceros (Rhinoceros sondaicus annamiticus), also known as Vietnamese Sunda rhinoceros, lesser one-horned rhinoceros, and Vietnamese rhinoceros
- Northern Sumatran rhinoceros (Dicerorhinus sumatrensis lasiotis), also known as Chittagong rhinoceros, and hairy-eared Sumatran rhinoceros, the largest of the smallest of extant rhinoceroses

== See also ==
- List of mammals of China
