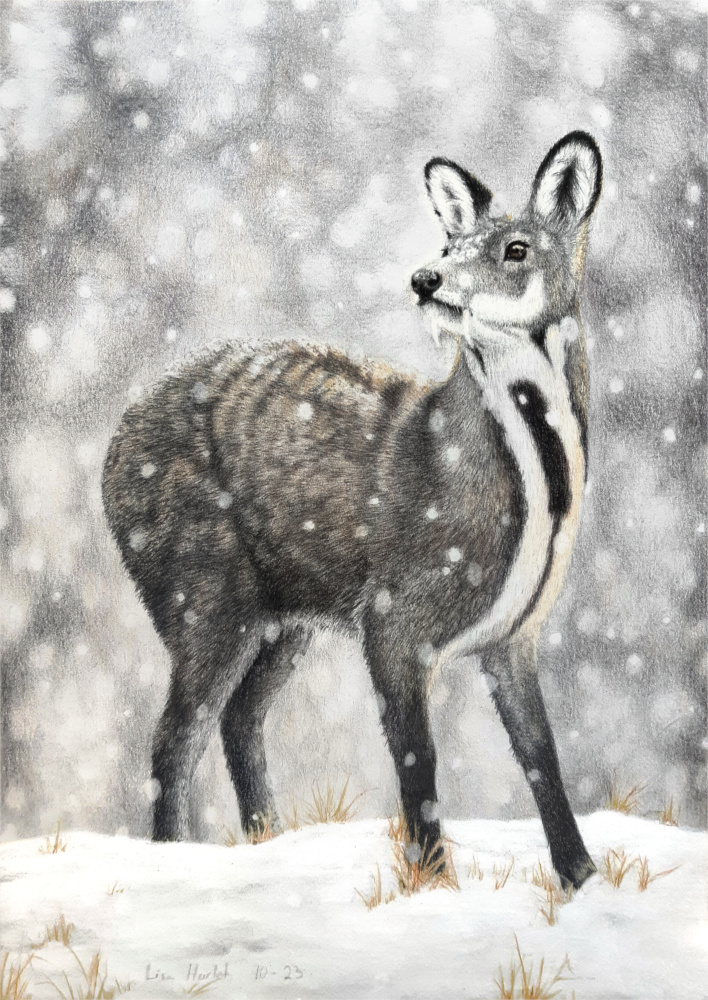
- Illustration of an Anhui musk deer in winter coat

Conservation status
- Endangered (IUCN 3.1)
- CITES Appendix I (Note: Only populations of Afghanistan, Bhutan, India, Myanmar, Nepal, and Pakistan. All other populations are included in Appendix II.)

Scientific classification
- Kingdom: Animalia
- Phylum: Chordata
- Class: Mammalia
- Order: Artiodactyla
- Family: Moschidae
- Genus: Moschus
- Species: M. anhuiensis

Binomial name
- Moschus anhuiensis Wang, Hu & Yan, 1982
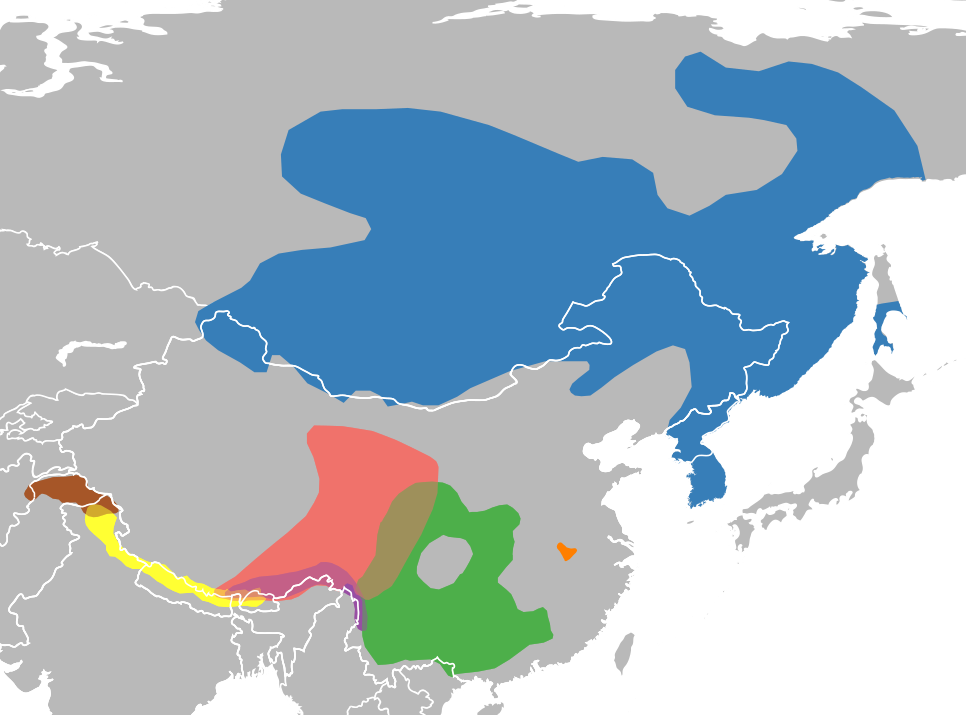
- Moschidae distribution. Moschus anhuiensis in orange.

= Anhui musk deer =

Species of mammal

The Anhui musk deer (Moschus anhuiensis) is an endangered species of musk deer that is endemic to the Dabie Mountains of western Anhui province, China. It was formerly described as a subspecies of Moschus berezovskii and Moschus moschiferus, but is now classified as a separate species.

== Habitat and distribution ==
Anhui musk deer inhabit high-elevations which consist of coniferous, broad-leaved, or mixed forests. Anhui musk deer are believed to require the dense vegetation of intact forests or shrublands, similar to other musk deer.

The species is only known to be found within and around the Mount Dabie area, within the western part of Anhui Province China. It is also believed that they spread to the Hubei Province section of Mount Dabie.

== Characteristics ==
While much research has not been performed on the Anhui musk deer, it is most comparable to Dwarf musk deer and Siberian musk deer. Like other musk deer, notable characteristics consist of a lack of antlers, enlarged canine teeth with the males' protruding, and a musk gland present on the males between the navel and genitalia.

The adults of the species are considered small, with a height of around 71 cm (28 in) at the head, or a shoulder height of 61 cm (24 in). The overall length is around 89 cm (35 in) from head to tail. Weight of the Anhui musk deer is around 8 kg (18 lb). They have a dark brown to gray coloration with darker ears and a distinct stripe on the neck and chest area.

=== Reproduction ===
During mating seasons, males will use their extended canine teeth to compete with other males over territory, where they will use their musk sac to mark territory boundaries and attract females. Females are said to reach sexual maturity within their first year, as well as being described as rarely having a single offspring and mostly producing twins, unlike other musk deer. Other information is not really known, but is believed to be similar to that of Dwarf musk deer or Siberian musk deer.

== Threats ==
The Anhui musk deer is currently listed as an endangered species by the International Union for the Conservation of Nature (IUCN), on their Red List, due to a suspected 50% population decrease over the past three generations (20–21 years), approximately. The main reason for this decline is primarily the unregulated, unsustainable hunting of the musk deer for its aromatic musk glands (used in cosmetics); while it is possible to extract musk glands, surgically, from live deer, this is more costly and time-consuming than simply shooting a musk deer and removing its scent glands. Additionally, considering the Anhui musk deer's namesake province, Anhui, is currently ranked as China's ninth-largest province by human population—with over 61 million residents—, human encroachment and infringement on wild habitat is a major concern.

=== Use and trade ===
The musk produced by the male Anhui musk deer is prized for its "masculine" and earthy aroma, thus it is widely used in cosmetics, as it has been for centuries. The scent glands contain alleged pharmaceutical and aphrodisiacal benefits (according to traditional Chinese medicine); despite the purported benefits and potential lucrative business or musk gland production, no sustainable option for musk gland harvest has, apparently, been suggested. Trade of musk is regulated by CITES, but is not prohibited by the group. Each male musk deer can yield about 25 g (0.88 oz) of the musk, which, while possible to be extracted from live animals, is (more often than not) simply taken from killed animals. Musk glands will likely continue to be harvested from killed animals, mostly in poorer or rural populaces, as 1 kg (2.2 lb) of musk can sell for around US$45,000.

Despite any official protections afforded to the species by China's government, including the killing of endangered species (such as the Anhui musk deer) being a criminal offense, hunting continues at a likely unsustainable rate, with no legal ramifications or incentives for hunters to stop. Most poachers are not charged with a crime, let alone apprehended, caught or otherwise reported. Furthermore, the hunting of most wildlife within China is not actively managed, regardless of the location being government/national park land, or the species' endangered status. Especially in more rural locales, away from the bustling metropolises, hunting is often considered one of the few options people have to survive, often at the expense of wildlife. Poorer regions, or more agrarian communities, often view hunting as a viable source of much-needed income, considering a "hot" commodity, such as the musk deer's scent gland, can be sold with such a high price-tag. Poaching of Anhui musk deer likely has gone on, and will continue, completely unregulated, regardless of location or time of year.

== Conservation ==
Since 2002, the Anhui musk deer has been listed on the First Category of State Key Protected Wildlife List in China, and is listed as critically endangered on the Chinese Red List. The species is also currently listed under Appendix II of CITES. There are currently no measures in place to prevent hunting or harvesting of the Anhui musk deer, nor provide any protected areas to preserve its habitat. Current population numbers are not currently known, with the last estimation being 700-800 individuals in 1985.

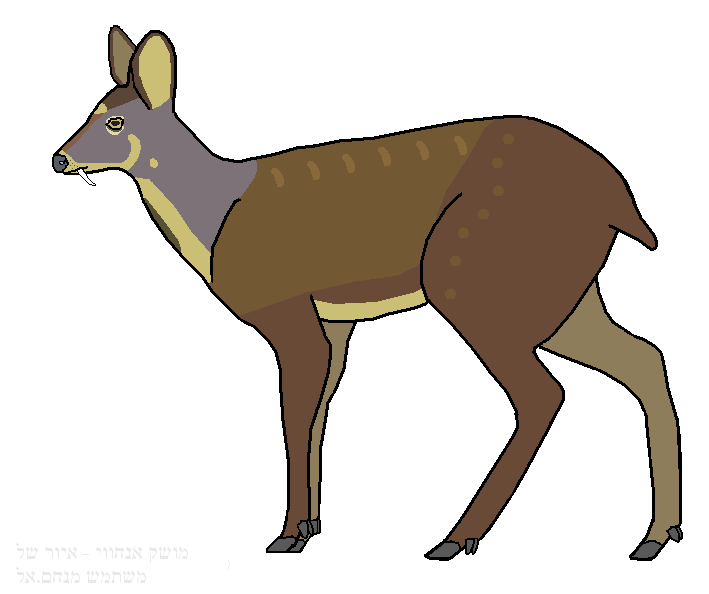
Moschus anhuiensis

== See also ==
- List of endangered and protected species of China
