= Deer musk =

Odorous substance from male musk deer's scent gland

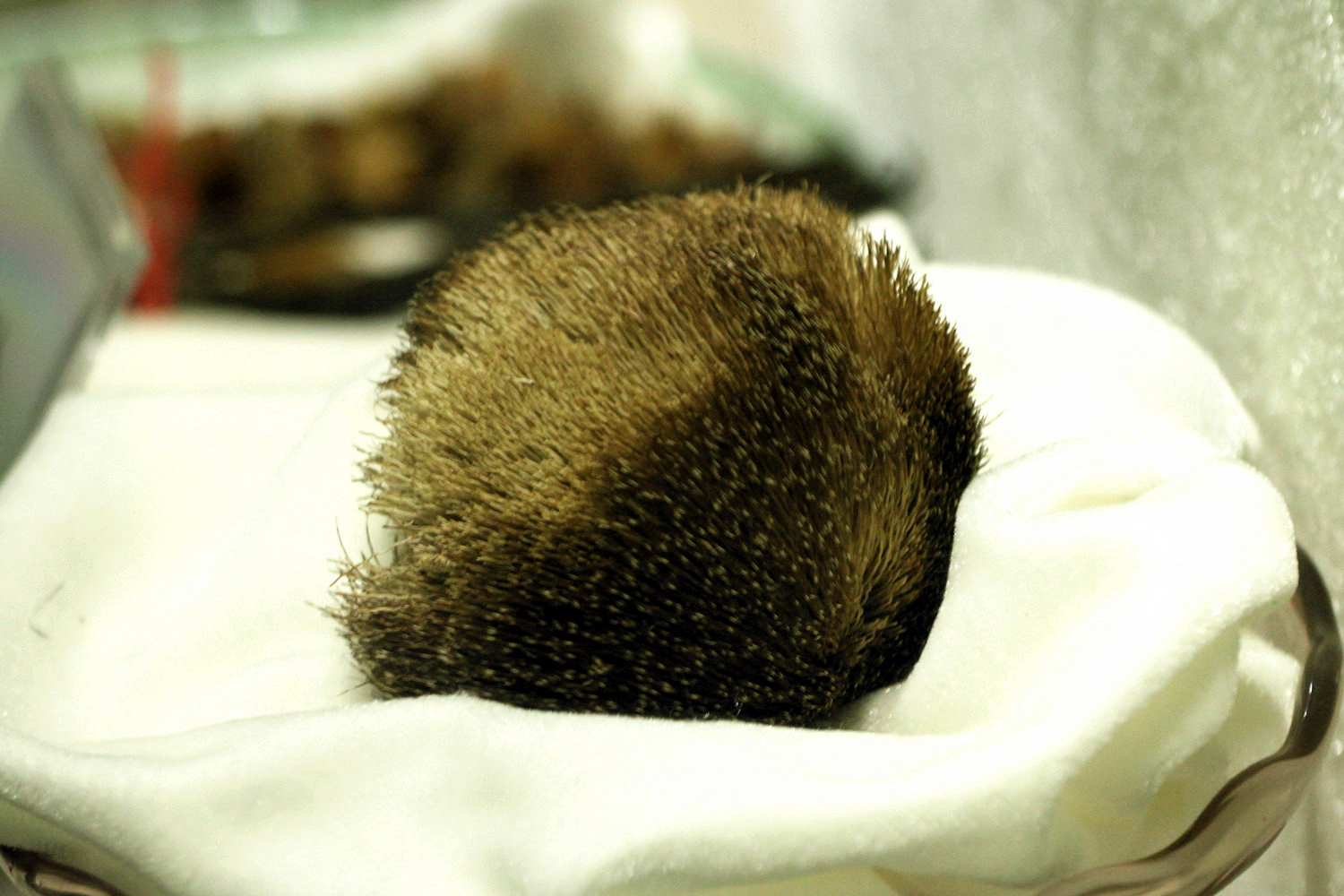
A musk pod, obtained from the male musk deer

Deer musk is a substance with a persistent odor, obtained from the abdominal scent glands of the male musk deer.

Although more commonly referred to as "musk", the term itself is often used to describe a wide variety of "musky" substances from other animals such as the African civet ("civet musk") or various synthetic musks whose compound exhibits some character of deer musk.

The demand for deer musk has led to a severe decrease in musk deer populations; however, musk can be removed from the gland of live male deer without killing the animal and without harming their growth, breeding and health. The extraction of musk from live deer has been successfully conducted many times and the characteristics of musk have been studied at the Kathmandu Zoo in Nepal. Six of the seven musk producing species are listed as endangered.

It is also known as "hiran kasturi" in rural Indian regions where they are used to make perfumes and face masks.

== Cultural history ==
The etymology of the name musk, originating from Indian Sanskrit मुष्क muṣka (lit. 'small testicle'), spreading it to Middle Persian مشک mušk, Late Greek μόσχος (moskhos), Late Latin muscus, Middle French musc and Middle English muske, hints at its trade route.

Musk deer are among the most endangered species in the region. Scent glands from these deer can fetch thousands of rupees and are used for manufacturing perfume and traditional medicine.

Deer musk was unknown in the Western world in classical antiquity and reference to it does not appear until the 5th century AD when it is mentioned in the Talmud (Brachot 43.) as an animal-based fragrance. The 6th-century Greek explorer Cosmas Indicopleustes mentioned it as a product obtained from India. Soon afterwards Arab and Byzantine perfume makers began to use it, and it acquired a reputation as an aphrodisiac. Under the Abbasid Caliphate, it was highly regarded, and the caliphs of Baghdad used it lavishly. In the early 9th century, Al-Kindi included it in a large number of his perfume recipes and it became one of the important luxury items brought by Arabian ships from the East.

Deer musk has been a key constituent in many perfumes since its discovery, being held to give a perfume long-lasting power as a fixative. Despite its high price, musk tinctures were used in perfumery until 1979, when musk deer were protected as an endangered species by the Convention on the International Trade in Endangered Species of Wild Flora and Fauna (CITES). Today, the trade quantity of the natural musk is controlled by CITES but illegal poaching and trading continues.

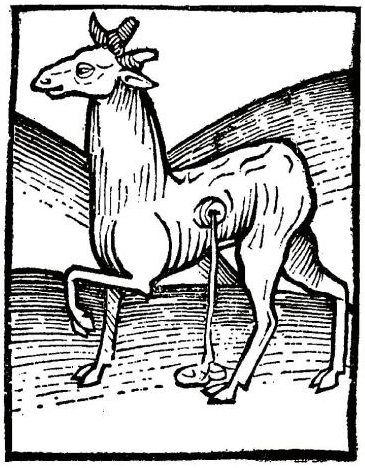
"Musk-cat", woodcut from Hortus Sanitatis, 1490

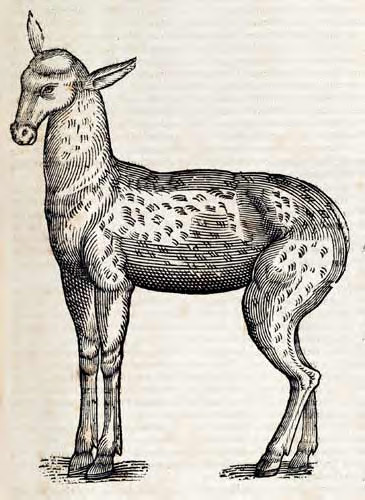
Musk-Cat, 1658

== Harvesting ==
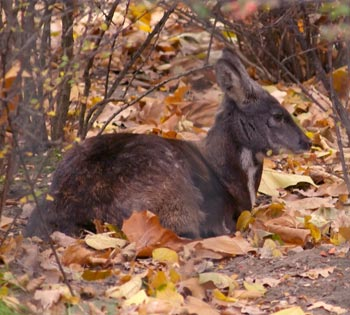
Moschus moschiferus, Siberian musk deer

Musk deer belong to the family Moschidae. White-bellied musk deer occurs in the Himalayas. To obtain deer musk, the deer is killed and its gland, also called "musk pod", is removed. Harvesting of musk pods is the main threat to Moschus species.

In China, musk pods from the dwarf musk deer, the alpine musk deer, and the Siberian musk deer are currently accepted per the Pharmacopoeia of the People's Republic of China, although official sources claim that more than 99% of the said use has been replaced by an artificial replacement of an undisclosed composition.

== Properties ==
Deer musk is of a dark purplish colour, dry, smooth and unctuous to the touch, and bitter in taste. According to Encyclopædia Britannica, "a grain of musk will distinctly scent millions of cubic feet of air without any appreciable loss of weight, and its scent is not only more penetrating but also more persistent than that of any other known substance". In addition to its odoriferous principle, it contains ammonia, cholesterol, fatty matter, a bitter resinous substance, and other animal principles.

The highest quality is Tonkin musk from Vietnam, followed by Assam and Nepal musk, while Carbadine musk from Russian and Chinese Himalayan regions are considered inferior.

== See also ==
- Preputial glands
- Perfume
- Musk
