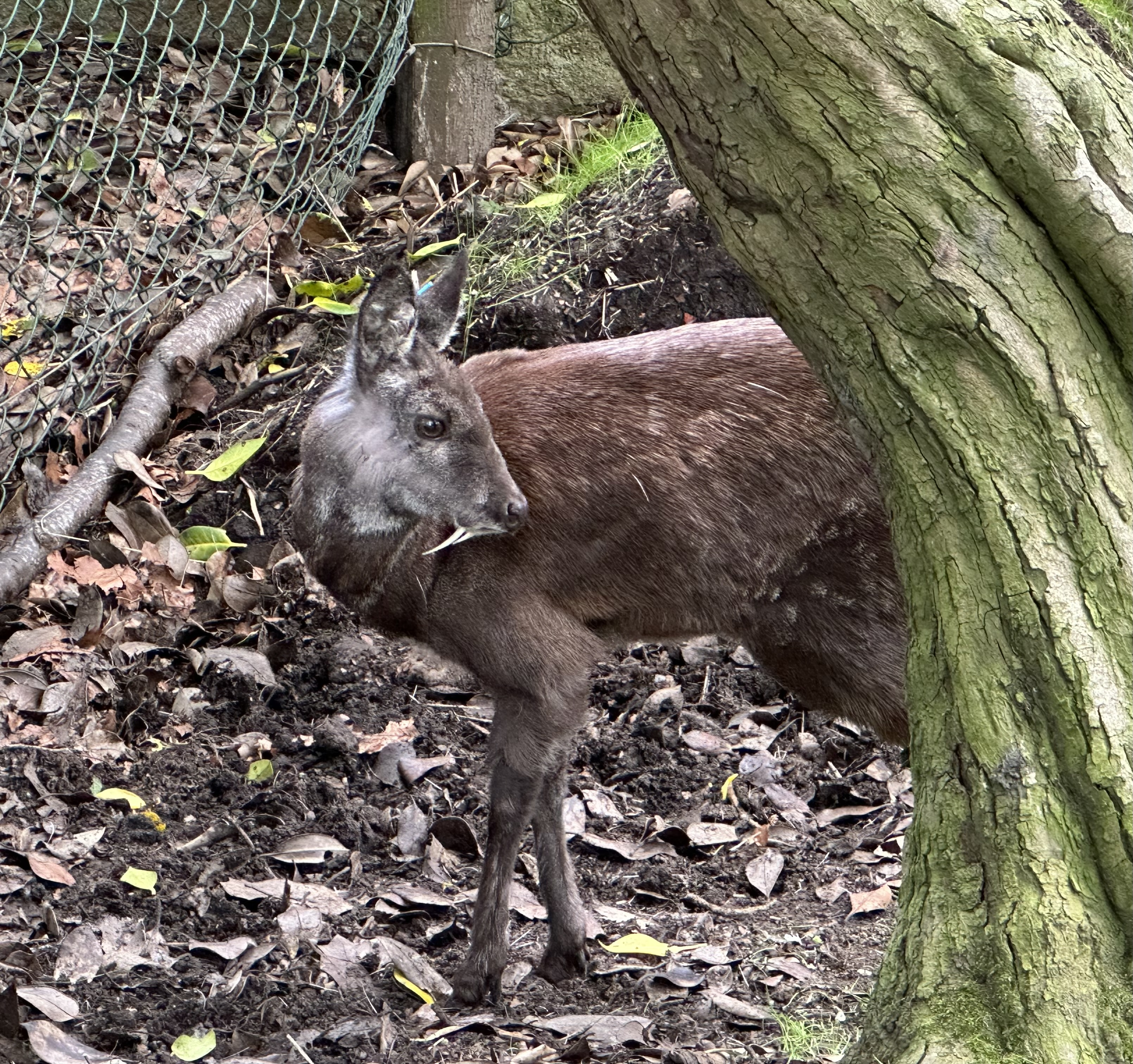
- Siberian musk deer

Scientific classification
- Kingdom: Animalia
- Phylum: Chordata
- Class: Mammalia
- Order: Artiodactyla
- Family: Moschidae; Gray, 1821
- Genus: Moschus; Linnaeus, 1758

Type species
- Moschus moschiferus Linnaeus, 1758

Species
- M. anhuiensis – Anhui musk deer; M. berezovskii – Dwarf musk deer; M. chrysogaster – Alpine musk deer; M. cupreus – Kashmir musk deer; M. fuscus – Black musk deer; M. leucogaster – White-bellied musk deer; M. moschiferus – Siberian musk deer
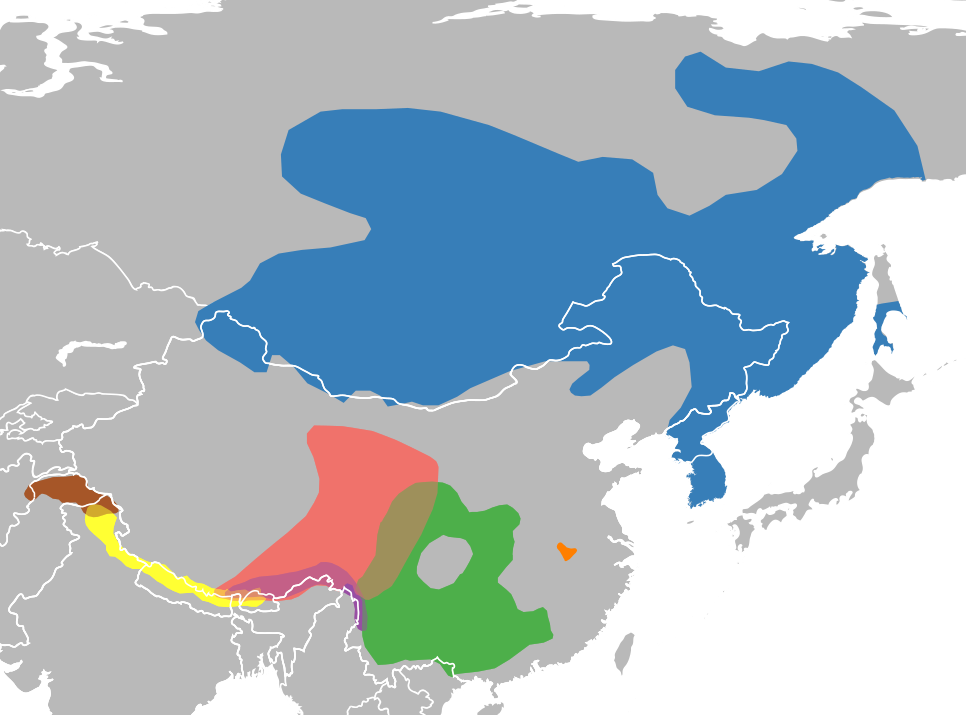
- Moschus distribution. M. anhuiensis in orange, M. berezovskii in green, M. chrysogaster in red, M. cupreus in brown, M. fuscus in purple, M. leucogaster in yellow, and M. moschiferus in blue.

= Musk deer =

Musk deer Temporal range: Late Miocene–recent

Genus of mammals

Musk deer can refer to any one, or all seven, of the species that make up Moschus, the only extant genus of the family Moschidae. Despite being commonly called deer, they are not true deer belonging to the family Cervidae, but rather their family is closely related to Bovidae, the group that contains antelopes, bovines, sheep, and goats. The musk deer family differs from cervids, or true deer, by lacking antlers and preorbital glands also, possessing only a single pair of teats, a gallbladder, a caudal gland, a pair of canine tusks and—of particular economic importance to humans—a musk gland.

Musk deer live mainly in forested and alpine scrub habitats in the mountains of East Asia, the Himalayas, and Siberia. They are entirely Asian in their present distribution, being extinct in Europe where the earliest musk deer are known to have existed from Oligocene deposits.

== Characteristics ==
Skull of a buck showing the characteristic teeth

Musk deer resemble small deer, with a stocky build and hind legs longer than their front legs. They are about 80 to 100 cm (31 to 39 in) long, 50 to 70 cm (20 to 28 in) high at the shoulder, and weigh between 7 and 17 kg (15 and 37 lb). The feet of musk deer are adapted for climbing in rough terrain. Like the Chinese water deer, a cervid, they have no antlers, but the males do have enlarged upper canines, forming sabre-like tusks. The dental formula is similar to that of true deer: 0.1.3.33.1.3.3.

The musk gland is found only in adult males. It lies in a sac located between the genitals and the umbilicus, and its secretions are most likely used to attract mates.

Musk deer are herbivores, living in hilly, forested environments, generally far from human habitation. Like true deer, they eat mainly leaves, flowers, and grasses, with some mosses and lichens. They are solitary animals and maintain well-defined territories, which they scent mark with their caudal glands. Musk deer are generally shy and either nocturnal or crepuscular.

Males leave their territories during the rutting season and compete for mates, using their tusks as weapons. In order to indicate their area, musk deer build latrines. These locations can be used to identify the musk deer's existence, number, and preferred habitat in the wild. Female musk deer give birth to a single fawn after about 150–180 days. The newborn young are very small and essentially motionless for the first month of their lives, a feature that helps them remain hidden from predators.

Musk deer have been hunted for their scent glands, which are used in perfumes. The glands can fetch up to $45,000/kg on the black market. It is rumored that ancient royalty wore the scent of the musk deer, and that it is an aphrodisiac.

== Population ==
Musk deer have a global population between 400,000 and 800,000 currently; however, the exact count is undetermined. They are widely spread; however, their population density increases within China, Russia, and Mongolia. Musk deer are commonly found in China, and they are spread over 17 provinces. This population is mainly located around the Himalayas in southern Asia, southeast Asia, and eastern Asia. They are also found in a few spots in Russia. As of 2003, they became a protected species due to their declined overall population. Musk deer have many subspecies that have varying population sizes, within the overall total, and all are threatened. Over the past twenty years, the populations have been able to slightly recover due to the captive breeding of these animals, specifically in China. Musk deer populations are recovering due to the protocols and rules being set in place to protect the species.

== Habitat ==
The musk deer species is generally solitary and lives in the higher regions of mountain ranges, such as the Himalayas. The varying species' habitats include different atmospheres and necessary resources for their survival, while including similar universal resources.

== Conservation ==
Musk deer population has been declining recently due to environmental and human factors. As a large-bodied mammal, they have great needs that are not able to be sustained due to habitat fragmentation. This species is largely protected due to the threat of extinction, due to the increase in illegal hunting. Illegal hunting has significantly decreased the population throughout many of the provinces musk deer occupy. Their habitats are being lost to colonization and deforestation and hunting for musk deer was on the rise. They were hunted for their distinct products that are very valuable in the market. Since then, the Chinese government has stepped in to regulate these issues. They have placed rules pertaining to the killing of musk deer and created havens for the deer to survive. To help with the declining numbers, the deforestation of their natural habitat should be stopped and new habitats should be invested in them. Global climate change has also driven the musk deer population down. The warmer climates result in the drive to higher elevations and latitudes. Global warming and habitat fragmentation are two causes for the population decrease.

== Evolution ==
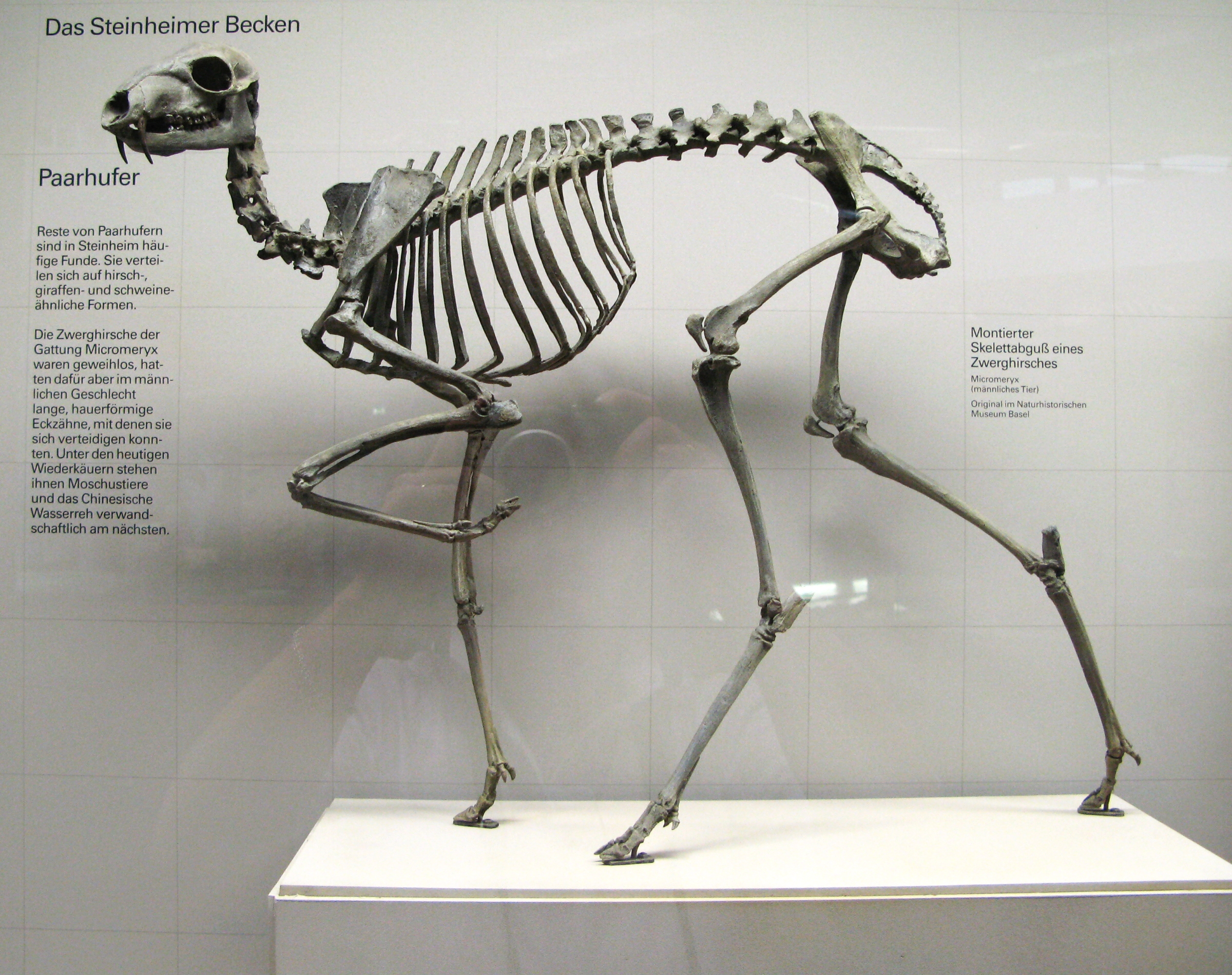
Skeleton of Micromeryx showing the general skeletal features

Musk deer are the only surviving members of the Moschidae, a family with a fossil record extending over 25 million years to the late Oligocene. The group was abundant across Eurasia and North America until the late Miocene, but underwent a substantial decline, with no Pliocene fossil record and Moschus the only genus since the Pleistocene. The oldest records of the genus Moschus are known from the Late Miocene (Turolian) of Lufeng, China.

=== Taxonomy ===
While they have been traditionally classified as members of the deer family (as the subfamily "Moschinae") and all the species were classified as one species (under Moschus moschiferus), recent studies have indicated that moschids are more closely related to bovids (antelope, goats, sheep and cattle).

Genus Moschus
Species name	Common name	Distribution
M. moschiferus	Siberian musk deer	North East Asia
M. anhuiensis	Anhui musk deer	Eastern China
M. berezovskii	Dwarf musk deer	South China and Northern Vietnam
M. fuscus	Black musk deer	Eastern Himalayas
M. chrysogaster	Alpine musk deer	Eastern Himalayas
M. cupreus	Kashmir musk deer	Western Himalayas and Hindu Kush
M. leucogaster	White-bellied musk deer	Central Himalayas

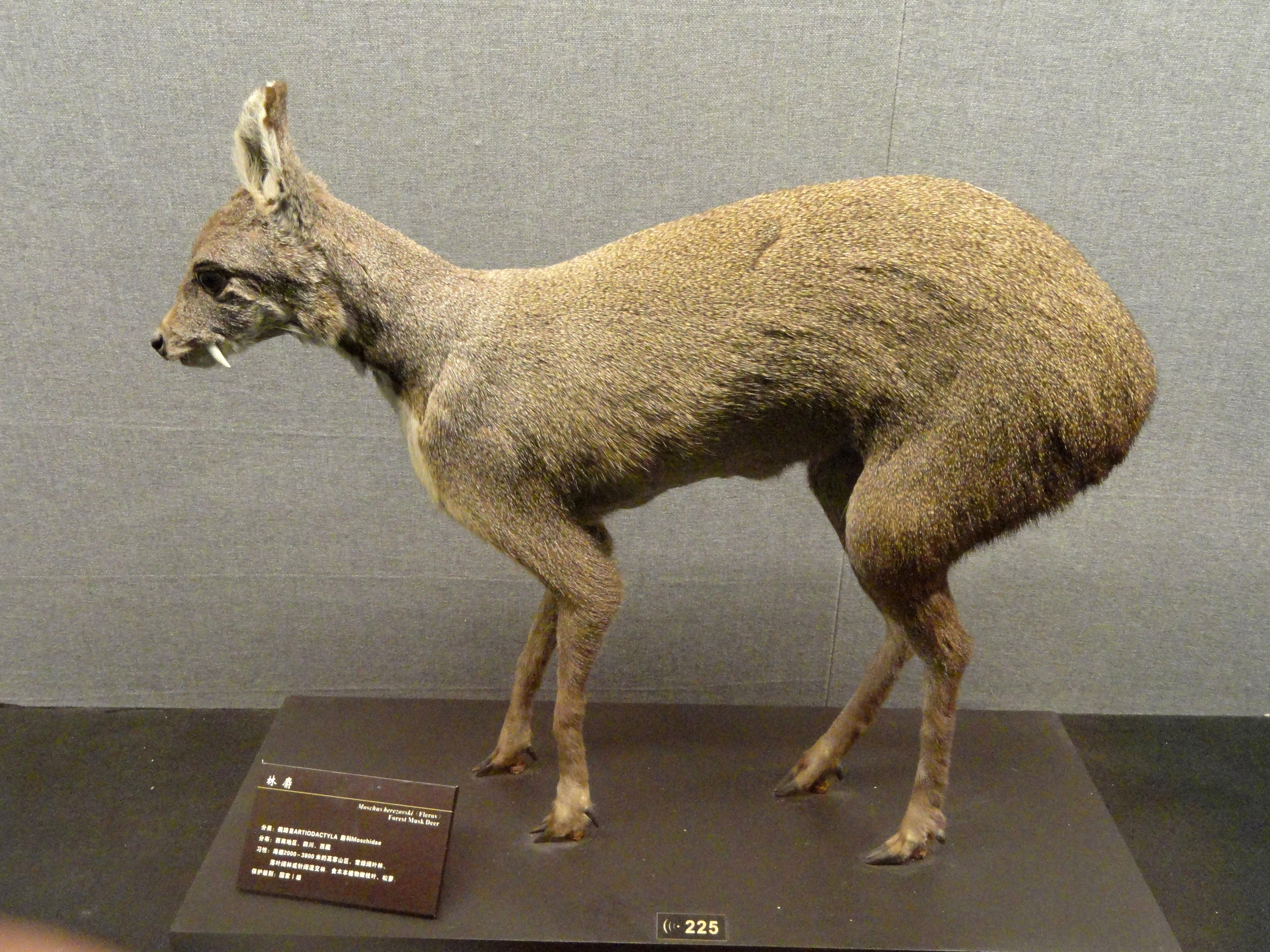
Dwarf musk deer

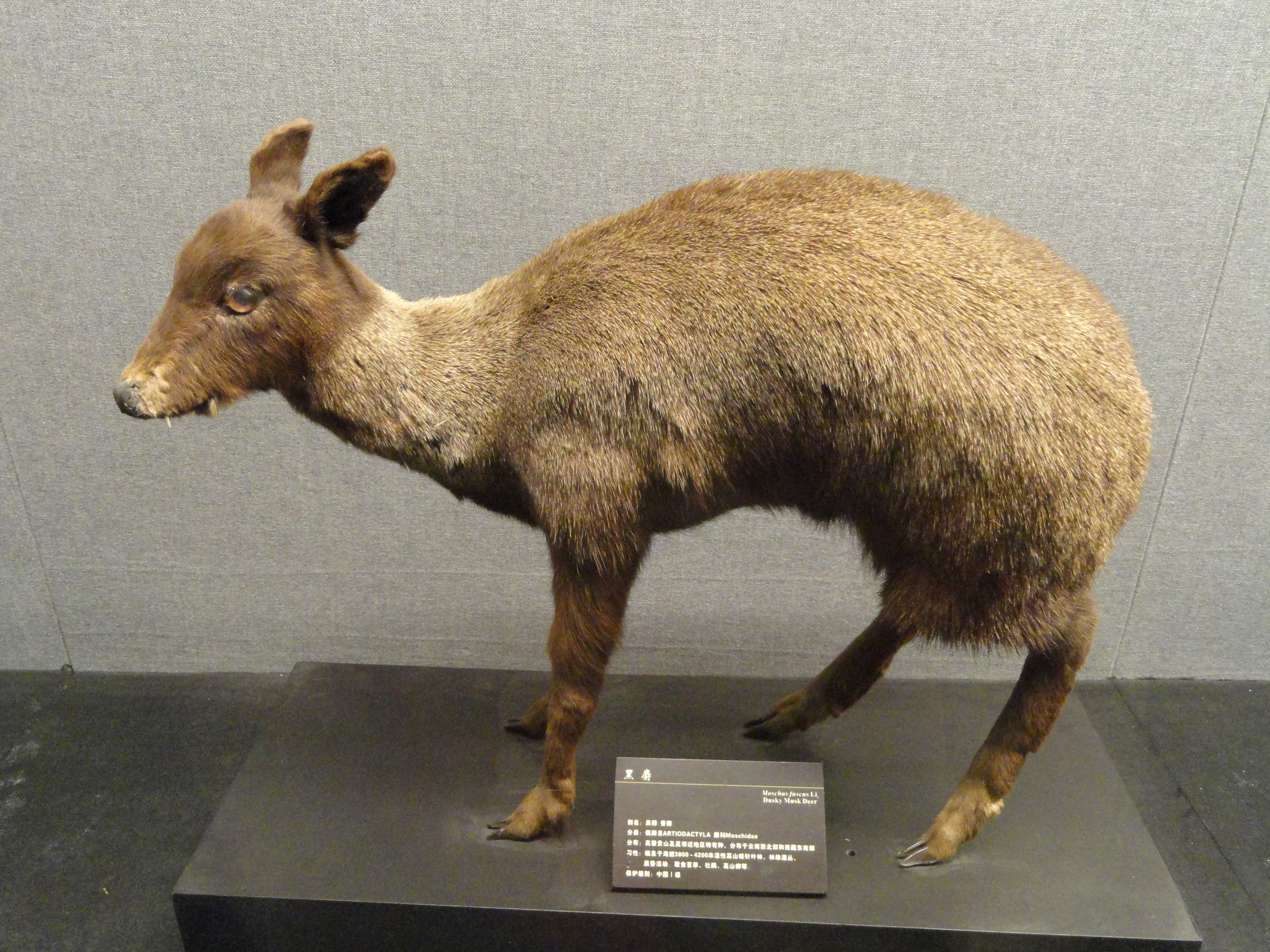
Black musk deer

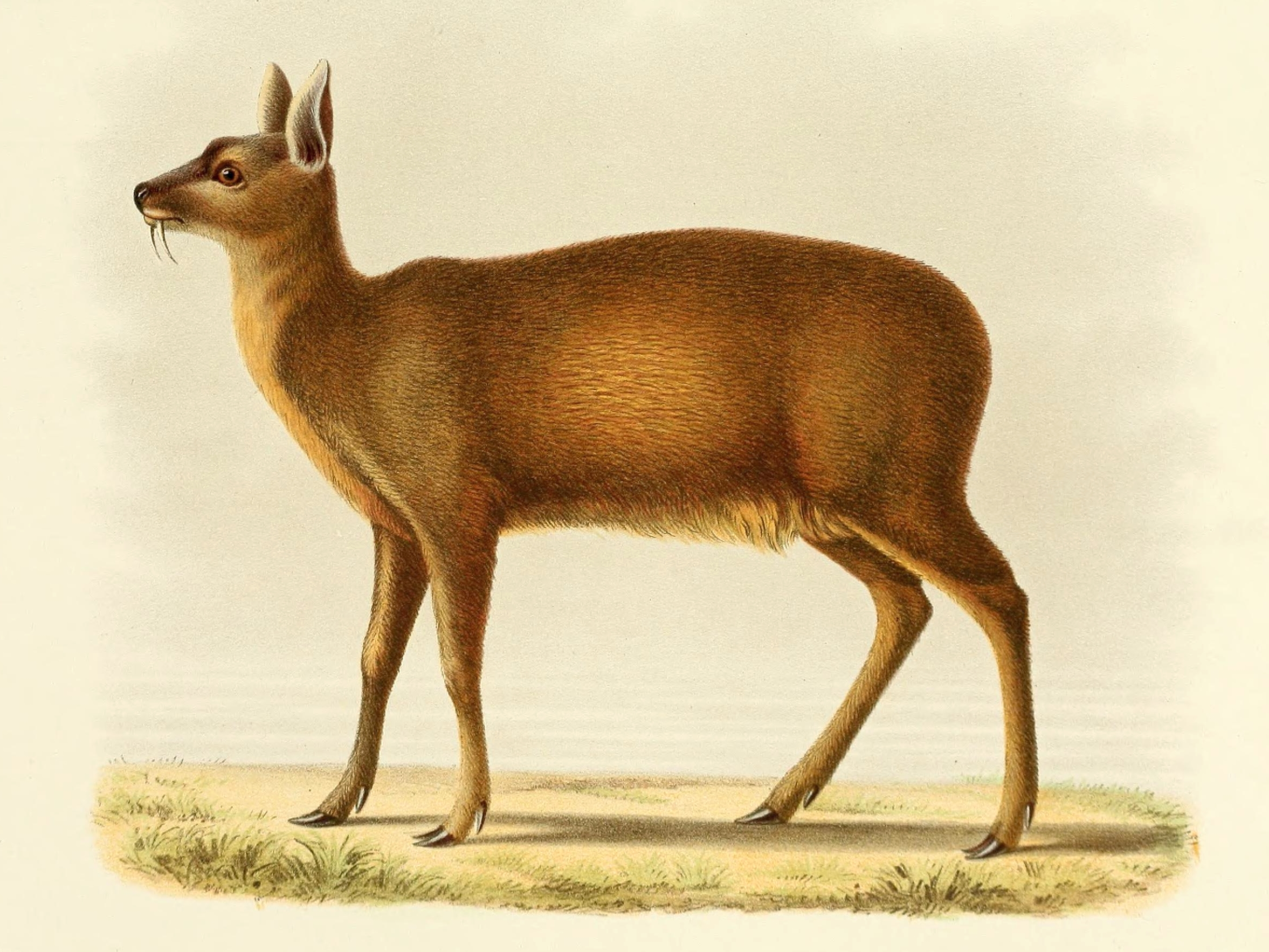
Alpine musk deer
