= Preorbital gland =

Paired exocrine gland in many hoofed animals

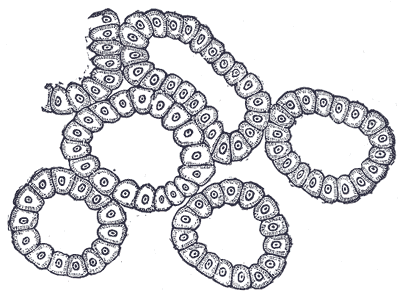

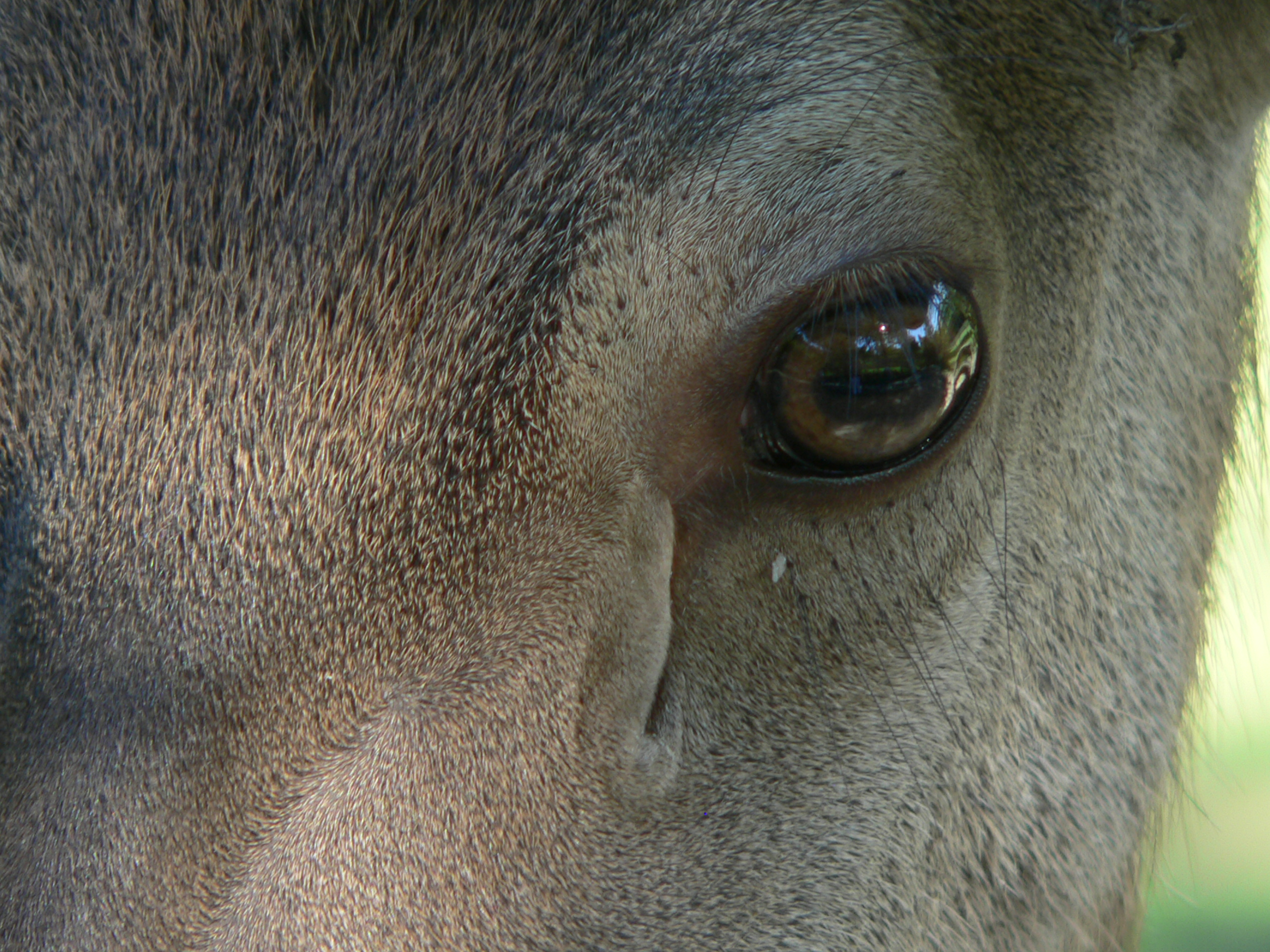
- Subadult male red deer (Cervus elaphus). The preorbital gland is closed in this photograph.

Details
- Artery: lacrimal artery
- Nerve: lacrimal nerve, Zygomatic nerve via Communicating branch, greater petrosal nerve

Identifiers
- Latin: glandula praeorbitalis

The preorbital gland is a paired exocrine gland found in many species of artiodactyls, which is homologous to the lacrimal gland found in humans. These glands are trenchlike slits of dark blue to black, nearly bare skin extending from the medial canthus of each eye. They are lined by a combination of sebaceous and sudoriferous glands, and they produce secretions which contain pheromones and other semiochemical compounds. Ungulates frequently deposit these secretions on twigs and grass as a means of communication with other animals.

The preorbital gland serves different roles in different species. Pheromone-containing secretions from the preorbital gland may serve to establish an animal's dominance (especially in preparation for breeding), mark its territory, or simply to produce a pleasurable sensation to the animal. Because of its critical role in scent marking, the preorbital gland is usually considered as a type of scent gland. A further function of these glands may be to produce antimicrobial compounds to fight against skin pathogens. Antimicrobial compounds found in these glands may be biosynthesized by the animal itself, or by microorganisms that live in these glands.

== In cervids ==
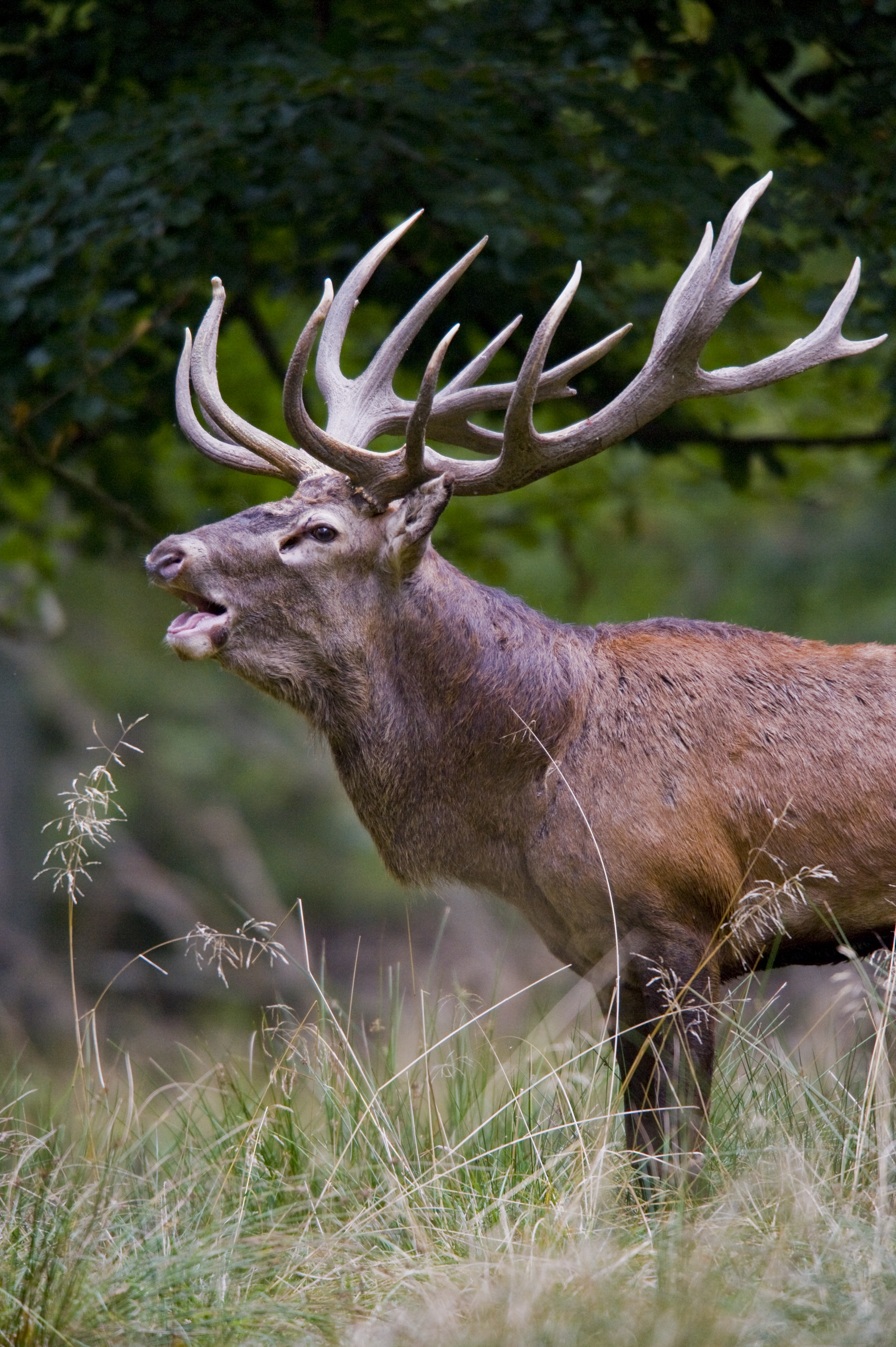
Photograph of a male red deer (Cervus elaphus), taken during the mating season. The prominent preorbital gland is enlarged and dilated.

Deer have seven types of external scent glands distributed across their bodies. These are the forehead glands (on the forehead), the preorbital glands (below the eyes), the nasal glands (inside the nostrils), the interdigital glands (between the toes), the preputial gland (inside the foreskin of the deer's penis), the metatarsal glands (outside of the hind legs), and the tarsal glands (located inside of the hind legs). Although it is not their primary function, the salivary glands also function as scent glands. Deer rely heavily on the scent glands to communicate with other members of their species, and possibly even with members of other species. A deer may rub its preorbital gland (e.g., on a branch) purely for pleasure.

=== North American deer ===
The two major species of deer found in North America are the white-tailed deer (Odocoileus virginianus) and the mule deer (Odocoileus hemionus). The most important sense in these animals is the sense of smell — so much so that they have an accessory olfactory system. The vomeronasal organ, located at the base of the nasal cavity, is the sensory organ for this system. Besides locating food and water, deer rely on their two separate olfactory systems to detect the presence of predators, as well as to supply them with information about the identity, sex, dominance status, and reproductive status of other deer.

The preorbital gland of O. virginianus is about 22 millimeters (0.87 in) in length, while that of O. hemionus is roughly 40 millimeters (1.6 in) in length. In black-tailed deer (O. h. columbianus), a subspecies of O. hemionus, the preorbital gland measures about 32 millimeters (1.3 in). In all of these animals, the preorbital glands are surrounded by muscle which is under voluntary control, at least to some extent.

It is not entirely clear whether the preorbital gland secretions of North American deer are significant for chemical communication. Most of the time the glands remain closed, but deer are capable of opening them to emit an odor in certain circumstances. For example, a rutting male may dilate its preorbital glands to signal aggression to another nearby male. Female deer often open their glands while caring for their young.

=== Other deer ===
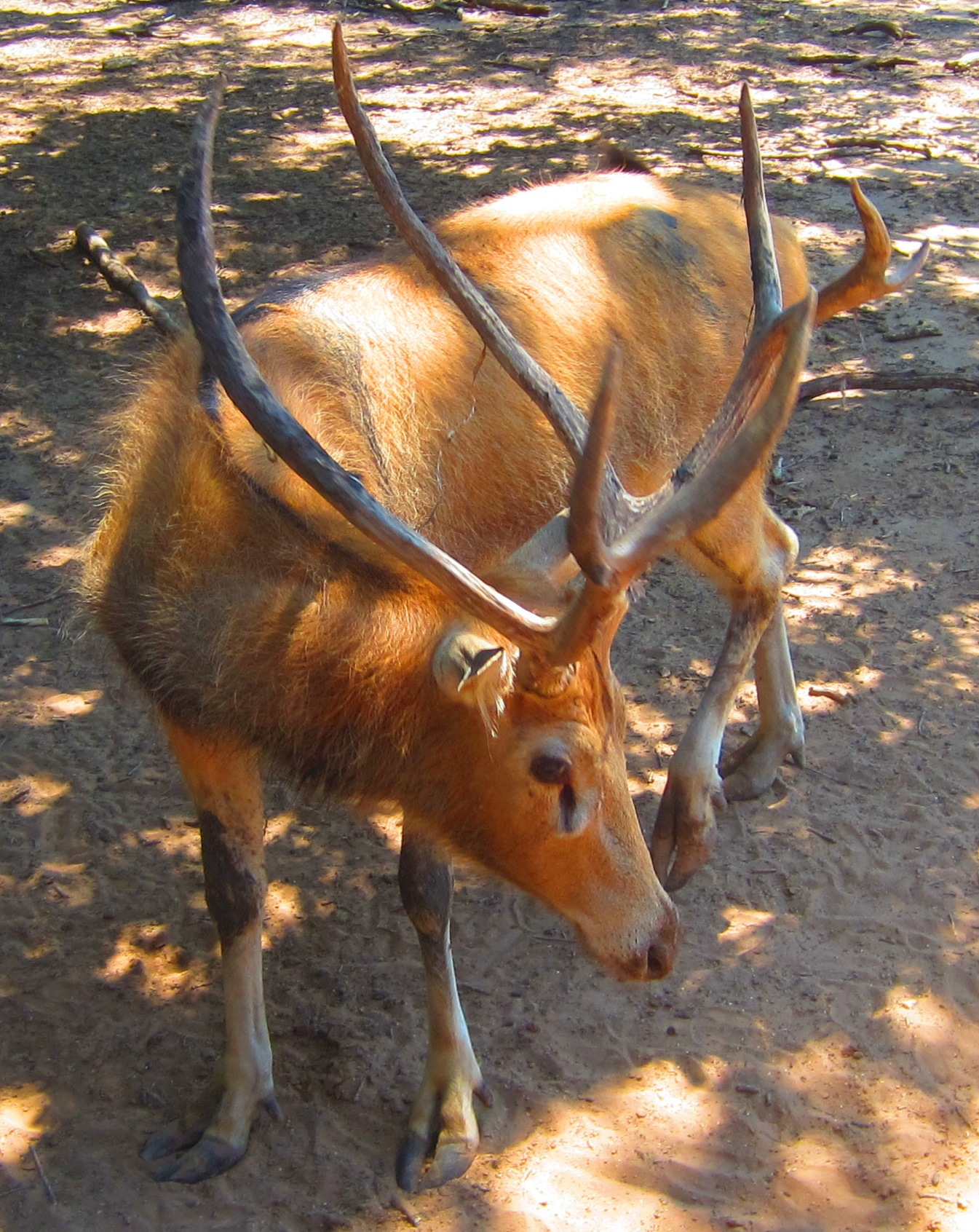
A male Père David's deer (Elaphurus davidianus). Note the large preorbital gland extending from just below the orbit.

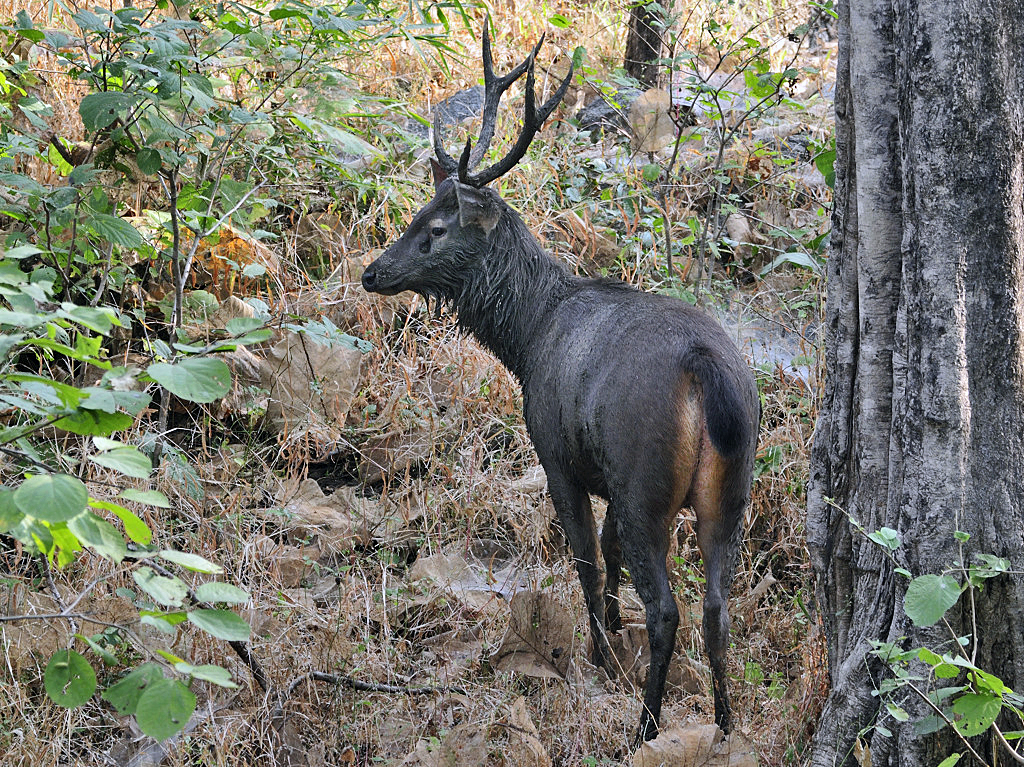
A male sambar (Rusa unicolor) in Pench National Park, Madhya Pradesh, India. These animals are often referred to as "four-eyed deer", due to their large preorbital glands.

In juvenile red deer (Cervus elaphus), the preorbital gland appears to play a role in the response to stress. The preorbital gland is closed in a relaxed calf, whereas it is open in a stressed calf. One example of this is the signalling of hunger and satiety. Fawns open their preorbital glands as a signal that they are hungry, and close the gland after feeding, when they are no longer hungry.

The adult Indian muntjac (Muntiacus muntjac) is a solitary animal, except during the rut (mating season) and for the first six months after giving birth. Adult males in particular are widely separated. Marking grass and bushes with secretions from their preorbital glands appears to be involved in the acquisition and maintenance of territory.

== In bovids ==
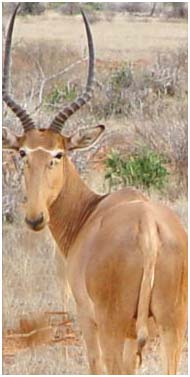
Hirola (Beatragus hunteri) are often referred to as the "four-eyed antelope", due to their large preorbital glands

The bovids (family Bovidae) comprise some 140 species of ruminants in which at least the males bear unbranched, hollow horns covered in a permanent sheath of keratin. Most species of bovids have means of spacing themselves across their habitat; territorial behavior is the most consistent type of spacing behavior.

Caprids (dwarf antelope, such as the sheep, goats, muskox, serows, gorals, and several similar species) use their preorbital glands to establish social rank. For example, when competition arises between two grazing sheep (Ovis aries), they have been observed to nuzzle each other's preorbital glands. By sending and receiving olfactory cues, this behavior appears to be a means of establishing dominance and of avoiding a fight, which would otherwise involve potentially injurious butting or clashing with the forehead.

The antilopine bovids (dwarf antelope, such as the springbok, blackbuck, gazelles, dik-diks, oribi, and several similar species) have well-developed preorbital glands.

Among the cephalophines, members of the Philantomba and Sylvicapra genera are all solitary animals which display territorial behavior and have well-developed preorbital glands. Maxwell's duiker (Philantomba maxwellii) is a solitary animal which utilizes preorbital gland secretions to mark its territory. This behavior is observed most in adult males, less frequently in females, and less still in subadults of this species. Secretions from the preorbital gland of the common duiker contain at least 33 different chemical compounds. Two thiazole compounds and an epoxy ketone are present in significantly higher concentrations in male than in female secretions, suggesting that they could serve as sex recognition cues.

The alcephine bovids (wildebeests, hartebeests, hirola, bontebok, blesbok, and several similar species) have preorbital glands which secrete complex mixtures of chemical compounds. The preorbital glands of the bontebok (Damaliscus pygargus pygarus) are larger in males than in females. Their secretions contain at least forty different chemical compounds, and are deposited on grass and twigs at the borders of their territory. They then appear to transfer the secretions from the grass to their horns and forehead by waving the head from side to side across the stalk bearing the secretion. Marking of plant stalks with preorbital gland secretions is seen in both sexes. In contrast to the duikers and raphicerids, the klipspringer (Oreotragus oreotragus) is a semi-gregarious species, while the hirola (Beatragus hunteri) is fully gregarious. Nevertheless, these animals display territorial scent marking of grasses with secretions from their preorbital glands.

Differences in the social structure and marking behavior among different species may lead to a different size and position of the preorbital glands on the animal's face. For example, Günther's dik-dik (Madoqua guentheri) is a monogamous species of antelope that lives in a permanent territory, the boundaries of which the animals mark several times a day by actively pressing the preorbital glands to grasses and low-lying plants and applying the secretions. In this territorial animal, the preorbital glands remain of considerable size throughout the year. The glands are located in large preorbital pits in the lacrimal bone, and are surrounded by specialized facial muscles that compress them to express the secretions more effectively. In contrast, the saiga antelope (Saiga tatarica) is a polygamous and somewhat nomadic species which does not occupy any permanent territory at any time during the year. For most of the year the preorbital glands remain small, only growing to substantial size during the rut. At that time of year, secretions ooze more or less continuously from the glands. In this nonterritorial animal, the preorbital glands are not as well-developed, lack well-developed surrounding facial muscles, and are positioned in an inconspicuous and shallow depression of the lacrimal bone.

== Research directions ==
The recent identification of several antimicrobial compounds from the secretions of animal dermal scent glands may be a new area of drug development. Assuming functional analogs of these lead compounds can be synthesized and found to be effective in vivo, the potential exists for producing new antimicrobial agents against pathogenic skin microorganisms.

== See also ==
- Deer musk
- Supraorbital gland
