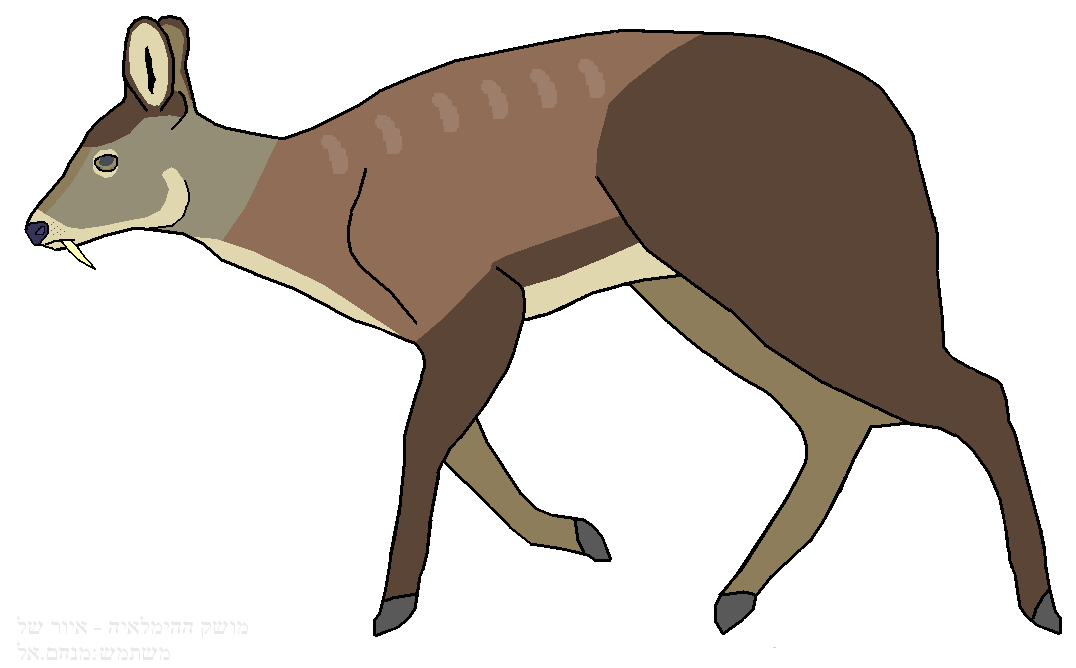

Conservation status
- Endangered (IUCN 3.1)
- CITES Appendix I (Note: Only populations of Afghanistan, Bhutan, India, Myanmar, Nepal, and Pakistan. All other populations are included in Appendix II.)

Scientific classification
- Kingdom: Animalia
- Phylum: Chordata
- Class: Mammalia
- Infraclass: Placentalia
- Order: Artiodactyla
- Family: Moschidae
- Genus: Moschus
- Species: M. leucogaster

Binomial name
- Moschus leucogaster Hodgson, 1839
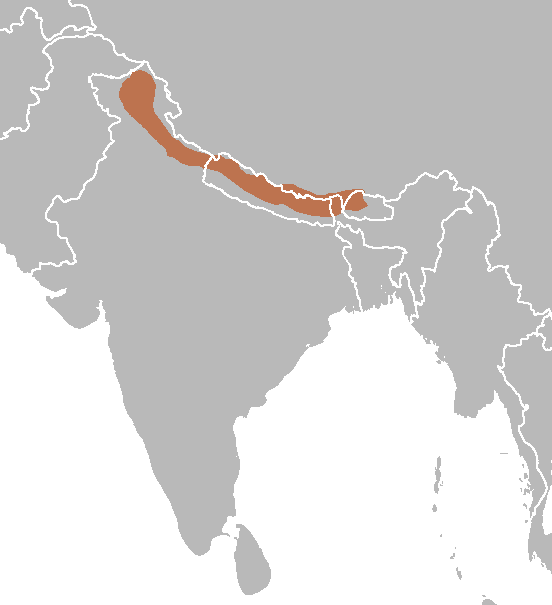
- Distribution

= White-bellied musk deer =

Species of mammal

The white-bellied musk deer or Himalayan musk deer (Moschus leucogaster) is a musk deer species occurring in the eastern Himalayas of Nepal, India, and possibly Bhutan and China. It is listed as endangered on the IUCN Red List because of overexploitation resulting in a probable serious population decline.

It was previously considered a subspecies of the Alpine musk deer, but was separated on the basis of different skull proportions.

== Characteristics ==
The white-bellied musk deer is well adapted for high elevations, with adaptations like a dense coat of coarse hairs with air-filled cells to insulate against the extreme temperature, well-developed dew claws, and broad toes that provide increased stability on steep slopes. It has a pair of enlarged and easily broken canines that grow continuously. The maximum length of these tusks is about 10 cm (3.9 in). These deer have a stocky body type; their hind legs are also significantly longer and more muscular than their shorter, thinner forelimbs. In place of running or leaping, this species tends to "bound." Finally, fawns of this species have white spots to help with camouflage, but as they mature these spots disappear.

The white-bellied musk deer has a waxy substance called deer musk that the male secretes from a gland in the abdomen. The deer use this to mark territories and attract females, but the musk is also used in the manufacture of perfumes and medicines.

== Distribution and habitat ==
The Himalayan musk deer is endemic to the eastern Himalayas and is distributed eastwards from the Annapurna Himalayas and Kali Gandaki Gorge. It has been confirmed by mitochondrial genomic data only in Nepal, but records from Sikkim and Bhutan likely represent this species, though lacking genetic confirmation. Records from camera trap photographs and a hunted carcass of musk deer from Yordi Rabe Supse Wildlife Sanctuary in Arunachal Pradesh's West Siang district are morphologically consistent with the Himalayan musk deer, but have not been genetically confirmed and may represent the black musk deer. Records of musk deer in China in southwestern Tibet Autonomous Region may also represent this species. It inhabits high alpine environments above elevations of 2,500 m (8,200 ft).

== Ecology and behaviour ==
During the day, white-bellied musk deer hide in dense cover and are shy and secretive. At night, they emerge to feed in more open habitats, and preferably select leaves of trees and shrubs with high protein and low fibre contents. During the winter, they subsist on poorer quality lichens, and even climb small trees to feed upon leaves that would otherwise be out of reach.

They are fairly sedentary occupying a small home range of up to 22 hectares. Males are fiercely territorial, only allowing females to enter their range. Territories are marked by carefully placed defecation sites and strong-smelling secretions, which are placed onto the surrounding plants. Males fight each other over females during the mating season, and use their long canines to fight and defend their territories. The females hide from all the commotion. For the males to attract the females and bring them out from hiding, they use their strong smelling musk.

A female has one or two young at a time. The young musk deer live off their mother's milk until they are about six months old and able to eat regular foods available in the wild. At 16 to 24 months old, they become sexually mature.

Himalayan musk deer can live for up to 10 to 14 years.

Their predators include the leopard, snow leopard, Eurasian lynx, red fox, and gray wolf. Juveniles have been reported to be killed by yellow-throated marten and large raptors.

== Threats ==
As the musk the deer produces is in demand for the manufacture of perfumes and medicines, it is highly valuable. Since the species is endangered and hard to find, its value on the wildlife trade market is increased still further. The hunting and trade of the white-bellied musk deer is the main threat to the species. Deer musk may sell for as much as $45,000/kg, making it one of the most valuable animal-derived products in the world. Hunters catch and kill the deer using snares. Only males produce the musk, so this creates a problem because females and young are caught in the traps and killed.

== Conservation ==
The white-bellied musk deer is protected by law in Bhutan, Nepal, and India. In China, hunting may be permitted in some areas, although a license is required. It is listed as an endangered species in Pakistan and is also found in a number of protected areas throughout; however, the uneven enforcement of legislation across its range has meant little impact on preventing the rampant trade in the species. Improving the enforcement of antipoaching laws is a key priority for the conservation of this species.

== Efforts being made ==
Captive farming for musk has been developed in China, and so far has shown that it is possible to extract musk from a deer without having to kill it. However, the captive deer succumb to disease and fighting and produce poorer quality musk. The killing of wild deer is thought to be the most cost-effective method of extracting musk. Open farming is a possible new way to extract the musk, whereby free-ranging or wild musk deer are caught and the musk then extracted, allowing the species to be conserved and survive.

== See also ==
- Kedarnath Wild Life Sanctuary
- Askot Musk Deer Sanctuary
