= Scent gland =

Exocrine glands found in most mammals

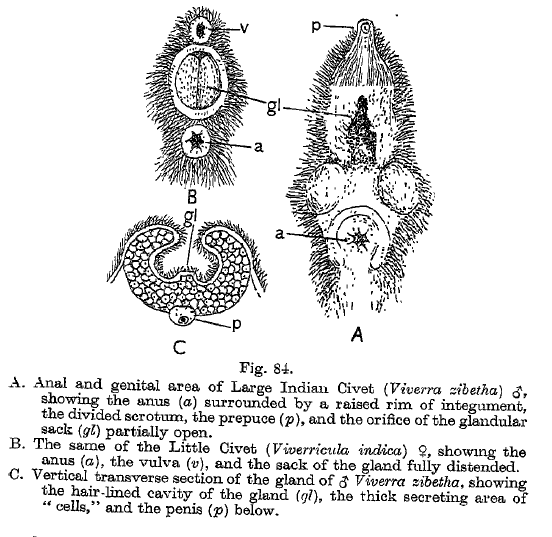
- Anal glands of a large Indian civet and a small Indian civet

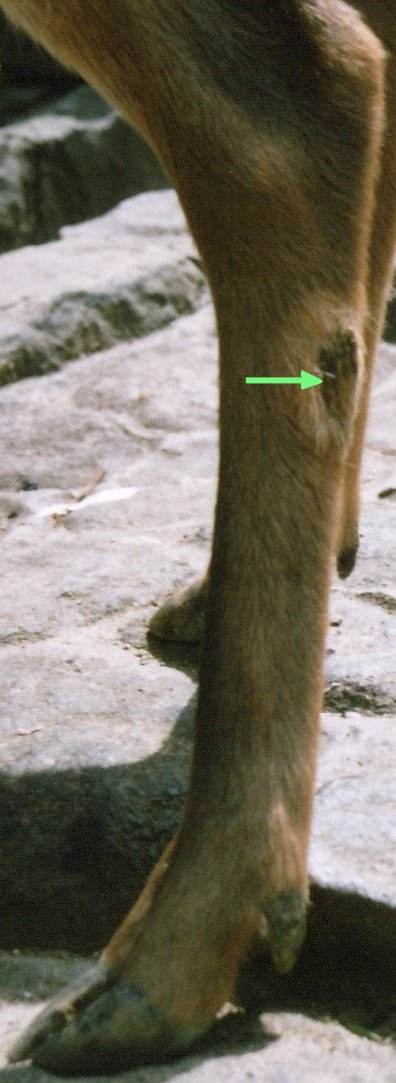
- The arrow is pointing to the metatarsal gland of a Sika deer

Details

Identifiers
- Latin: glandula odorifera
- MeSH: D012543

Scent gland are exocrine glands found in most mammals. They produce semi-viscous secretions which contain pheromones and other semiochemical compounds. These odor-messengers indicate information such as status, territorial marking, mood, and sexual behaviour. The odor may be subliminal—not consciously detectable. Though it is not their primary function, the salivary glands may also function as scent glands in some animals.

== In even-toed ungulates ==
The even-toed ungulates (Artiodactyla) have many specialized skin glands, the secretions of which are involved in semiochemical communication. These glands include the sudoriferous glands (located on the forehead, between the antlers and eyes), the preorbital glands (extending from the medial canthus of each eye), the nasal glands (located inside the nostrils), the interdigital glands (located between the toes), the preputial gland (located inside the foreskin of the penis), the metatarsal glands (located outside of the hind legs), the tarsal glands (located inside of the hind legs), and the inguinal glands in the lower belly or groin area.

Like many other species of Artiodactyla, deer have seven major external scent glands distributed throughout their bodies. Deer rely heavily on these scent glands to communicate with other members of their species, and possibly even with members of other species. For example, male white-tailed deer (Odocoileus virginianus) are often seen working over a scrape. First, the animal scrapes at the dirt with its hooves, depositing the scent from his interdigital gland on the ground. After that, he may bite the tip off an overhanging branch, depositing secretions from his salivary glands onto the branch. He may then rub his face on the overhanging branch, depositing secretions from the sudoriferous and preorbital glands on it.

The interdigital glands of male and female black-tailed deer contain three volatile ketones, 2-tridecanone, (E)-3-tridecen-2-one and (E)-4-tridecen-2-one. (E)-3-tridecen-2-one was shown to have antibiotic activity against some skin pathogens. These compounds are absent from white-tailed deer interdigital glands, which contain a number of 2-methylcarboxylic acids.

The tarsal gland appears to operate by a different mechanism than the other external scent glands. A behavior called rub-urination is central to this mechanism. During rub-urination, the animal squats while urinating so that urine will run down the insides of its legs and onto its tarsal glands. The tarsal glands have a tuft of hair which is specially adapted to extract certain chemical compounds from the animal's urine. For example, in the black-tailed deer (Odocoileus hemionus columbianus), the major constituent of the tarsal gland secretion is a lipid, (Z)-6-dodecen-4-olide. This compound does not originate in the tarsal gland itself, but rather it is extracted from the animal's urine by the tarsal hair tuft during the rub-urination process. In white-tailed deer, the presence and concentration of certain chemical compounds in the urine depend on the season, gender, reproductive status and social rank of the animals. This fact, along with the observation of rub-urination behavior in this animal (at least in the male) indicates that urine probably plays a role in olfactory communication in deer.

== In carnivorans ==
Canids have several scent glands that are used in olfactory communication. The fossa has several scent glands. Like herpestids it has a perianal skin gland inside an anal sac which surrounds the anus like a pocket. The pocket opens to the exterior with a horizontal slit below the tail. Other glands are located near the penis or vagina, with the penile glands emitting a strong odor. Like the herpestids, it has no prescrotal glands.

Anal glands are found in all carnivora including wolves, bears, sea otters and kinkajous.

== In other animals ==
- Apocrine sweat glands, such as in the armpits of humans
- Sebaceous glands, such as the cranial surface glands of the red-bellied lemur
- Flank glands, such as in voles or shrews
- Various glands producing pheromone signals found in non-avian reptiles, including Amphisbaenians, lizards, snakes, and Crocodylians
- Castor sacs, found in beavers
- Perineal glands, found in viverrids, guinea pigs, and porcupines
- Preputial glands, found in many species including mice, pigs, and wolves
- Supracaudal glands, found in canids

== See also ==
- Deer musk
- Red fox#Scent glands
- White-tailed deer#Marking
- Ozadenes, defensive glands of some arthropods that emit noxious compounds
