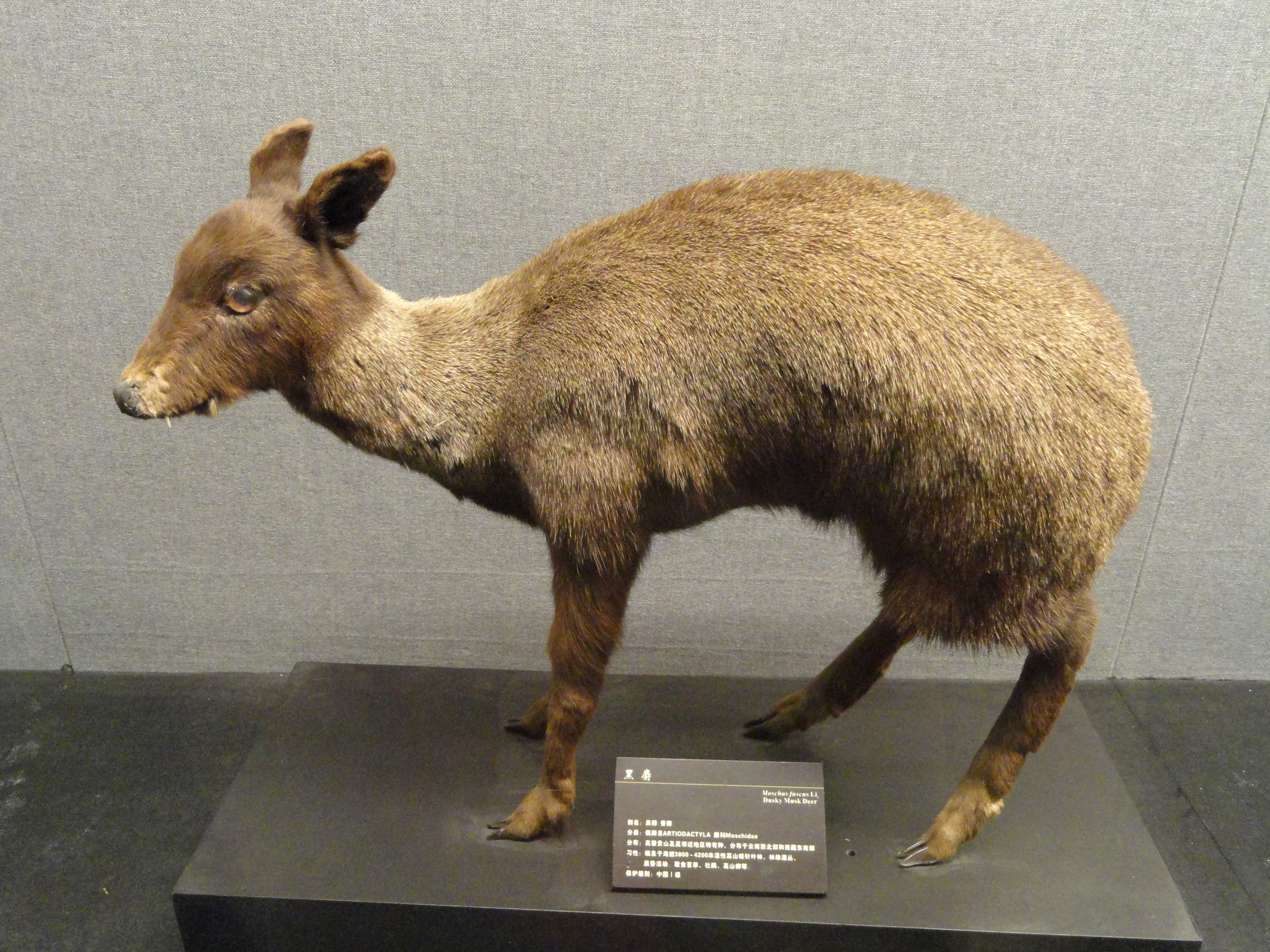

Conservation status
- Endangered (IUCN 3.1)
- CITES Appendix I (CITES) (Note: Only populations of Afghanistan, Bhutan, India, Myanmar, Nepal, and Pakistan. All other populations are included in Appendix II.)

Scientific classification
- Kingdom: Animalia
- Phylum: Chordata
- Class: Mammalia
- Order: Artiodactyla
- Family: Moschidae
- Genus: Moschus
- Species: M. fuscus

Binomial name
- Moschus fuscus Li, 1981
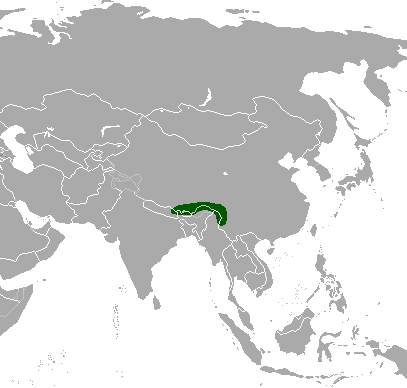

= Black musk deer =

Species of mammal

The black musk deer or dusky musk deer (Moschus fuscus) is a species of even-toed ungulate in the family Moschidae. It is found in Bhutan, China, India, Myanmar, and Nepal.

== Description ==
M. fuscus is, in appearance, a small deer with long, thick hind legs in comparison to the front legs, and no antlers. The dusky musk deer has large and well developed ears and eyes. Males and females are similarly sized, between 70 and 100 cm in length and 10 and 15 kg in weight, and generally have thick brown hair. There is variation in color and vibrancy, which is evident in spotting. Upper canine teeth in males form sabers that can extend past the jaw, but not in females. Unlike most cervids, this creature possesses a gallbladder and does not have the same facial glands. Mature males have a musk gland between the navel and genitalia, and females have two mammae.

== Behaviour and ecology ==
The black musk deer is nocturnal, and most of their activities take place at night, dawn and dusk. This species is highly solitary. An individual of this species is not likely to live with any other deer, although they have been known to let other females "babysit" their young. Territoriality is also another salient feature, especially for males. Living in the mountainous areas that have gorges and forests, these agile deer possess the ability to climb trees and move freely even at the dangerous edge of a cliff or in the very thick bushes. They are more ferocious than other members in the family Moschidae, especially in the case of males fighting for mates. In addition to low growls, these deer may attack their opponents with their tusks and strong fore hooves. Black musk deer are also considerably vigilant. They do not return to the site where they are frightened or attacked before, even it is in a previously established "safe" territory.

=== Predation ===
The black musk deer has a number of predators. Some studies show that up to 43% of the diet of some lynx may consist of black musk deer. Humans prey on the deer more than all of their natural predators combined. They are caught and killed mainly for their musk glands, which are used as a base for perfumes. Ethical concerns have led to the use of synthetic musk, but this has not prevented the black musk deer from being included on the endangered list. Black musk deer have mating periods beginning in late November into December, lasting roughly one month. They have a polygynous mating system, mating with more than one female at a time. Breeding typically occurs in November and December. During mating season, a male excretes scents from scent glands to indicate his territory

=== Reproduction ===
Gestation lasts roughly six months, ending in parturition, which normally occurs during June or July. Typically, females give birth to one or two young. The newborns weigh about 500 g, and have spots. The young are cared for by their mother after birth for several months, until weaning occurs. This process generally takes between three and four months. At six months, the young have typically reached full adult size. Sexual maturity, however, does not occur until roughly 18 months.

Not much is known about black musk deer parental care. Females are generally the main caretakers, as they watch their young for roughly 3 to 4 months. Typically, the young travel with their mothers throughout this period, during which the mother defends and grooms her young. The role of the father in parental care is currently unknown.

== Threats ==
All animals have a certain position on the food web. Even the black musk deer, although only endangered, its lack of species numbers has a detrimental effect on the environment in which it lives and the food web in which it participates. They are believed to affect the vegetation because they consume mostly grass and other plants. Because they are hunted by humans and other animals such as the wolverine, lynx, and yellow-throated marten, their numbers have been greatly reduced, so they are now on the endangered species list. With fewer black musk deer around, it has become more difficult for these predators to find food, greatly affecting the food web.

The musk glands of the full-grown males have been collected for use in soaps and perfumes. The deer are hunted by people and companies looking to make money. At one point in the 1980s, the musk of the adult male deer was worth four times its weight in gold. Because of its high demand in the soap and perfume market, the price of the musk was very high. Another reason the deer are hunted is due to the belief that the musk of the deer has medicinal purposes. By tradition, they use it as a sedative and a stimulant.

Due to excessive hunting, it has been since placed on the endangered list. Another issue associated with the loss of the deer is habitat loss from deforestation. Not much is being done to save the deer from possible extinction.
