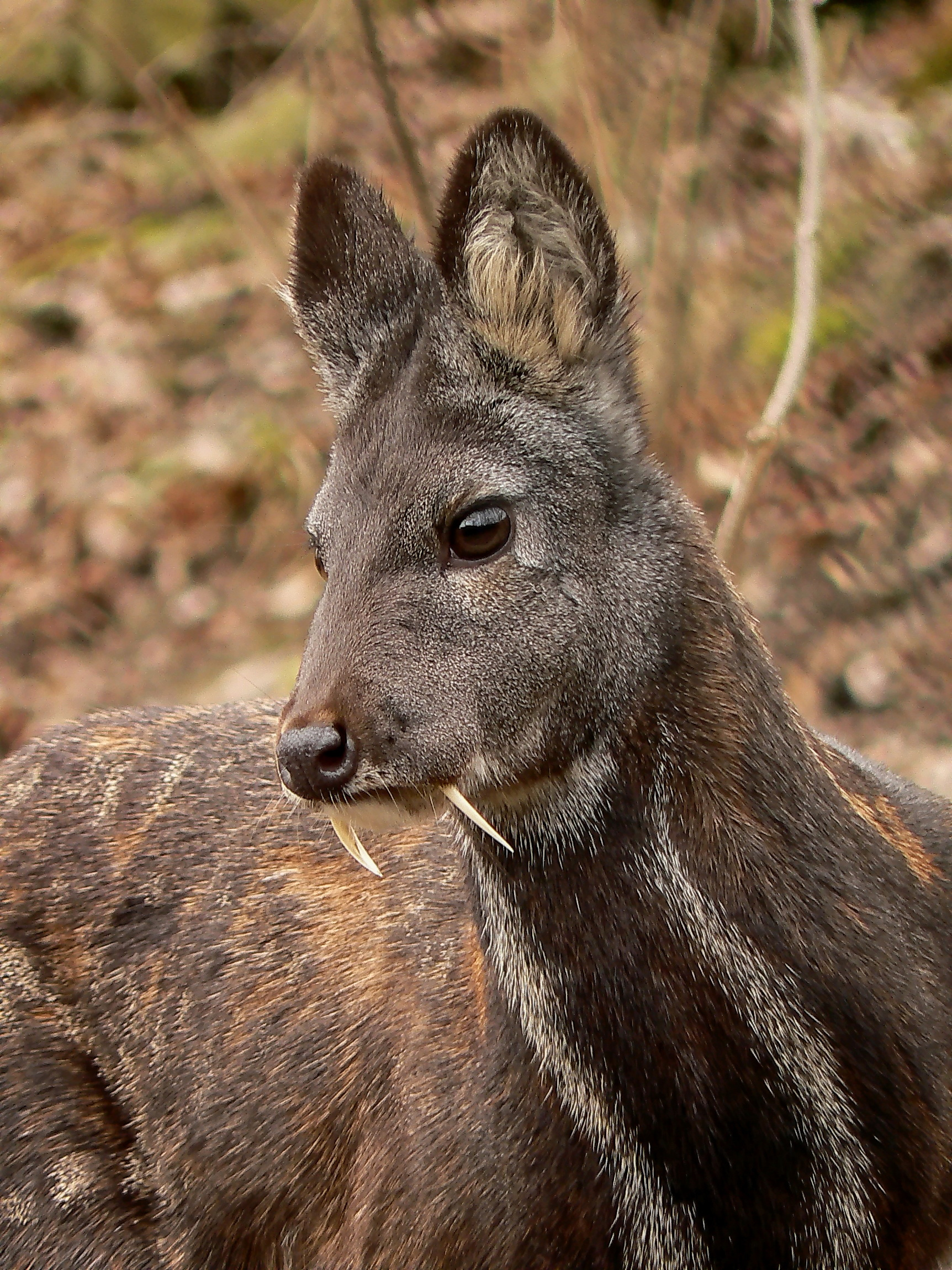
- Siberian musk deer at the Plzeň Zoo

Conservation status
- Vulnerable (IUCN 3.1)
- CITES Appendix I (Note: Only populations of Afghanistan, Bhutan, India, Myanmar, Nepal, and Pakistan. All other populations are included in Appendix II.)

Scientific classification
- Kingdom: Animalia
- Phylum: Chordata
- Class: Mammalia
- Order: Artiodactyla
- Family: Moschidae
- Genus: Moschus
- Species: M. moschiferus

Binomial name
- Moschus moschiferus Linnaeus, 1758
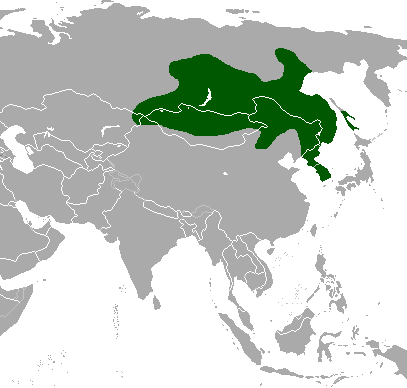
- Range of the Siberian musk deer

= Siberian musk deer =

Species of mammal

The Siberian musk deer (Moschus moschiferus) is a musk deer found in the mountain forests of Northeast Asia. It is most common in the taiga of southern Siberia, but is also found in parts of Mongolia, Inner Mongolia, Manchuria and the Korean Peninsula.

Their small shape allows them to hide from predators through tiny openings in the rocky terrain and also allows them to run exceptionally fast from their predators. Although bearing fangs, Siberian musk deer are actually herbivores, with their main source of nutrients being lichens.

Due to the severe amount of poaching for its musk gland, the deer population is continuing to decrease. It is expected that the population will be reduced to at least 30% over the next three generations. However, efforts from each of the cited countries are beginning to restore the musk deer's population.

== Characteristics ==
Different views of the skull of a Siberian musk deer

The species is largely nocturnal and migrates only over short distances. It prefers altitudes of more than 2,600 m (8,500 ft). Adults are small, weighing 7–17 kg (15–37 lb).

The Siberian musk deer is classified as Vulnerable by the IUCN. It is hunted for its musk gland, which fetches prices as high as $45,000 per kilogram. Only a few tens of grams can be extracted from an adult male. It is possible to remove the gland without killing the deer, but this is seldom done. In 2016, the Korean company Sooam Biotech was reported to be attempting to clone the Siberian musk deer to help conserve the species.

The most striking characteristics of the Siberian musk deer are its tusks and kangaroo-like face. Males grow the teeth for display instead of antlers.

== Taxonomy ==
Siberia, North Mongolia, Russia, North China and Korea – M. m. moschiferus

Russian Far East – M. m. turovi

Verkhoyansk Ridge – M. m. arcticus

Sakhalin – M. m. sachalinensis

Korea – M. m. parvipes

== Evolution ==
The earliest findings of the musk deer belong to the Upper and Middle Pleistocene and they all come from places in China and from the south of the Russian Far East.

The musk deer evolving in the mountain forests of eastern Asia spread widely since the Pleistocene in the mountain regions of Central, South-East Asia and in the north it spread to the south of the Russian Far East. The musk deer also inhabited Sakhalin Island before its separation from the continent during the Quaternary period.

== Maturity and mating ==
It takes approximately a year for the Siberian musk deer to reach maturity, with an average deer living 10–14 years.

During breeding season, male deer will grow tusks instead of antlers. These tusks are used to compete with other males and attract females. Tusks that are longer and stronger create a more intimidating stance and become more attractive to females as the offspring of that male are likely to become healthier.

Once the male and the female deer have procreated, the females will become pregnant for over 6 months. Females can give birth to 1–3 offspring, usually between the months of May through June.

== Behaviors ==
Musk deer will mark their territory, warning trespassing deer not to cross the boundary. When marking their territories, musk deer gather fallen branches, tree trunks, as well as plant stems, and place them in a circle. While placing the various branches around the circle, the deer will often do an olfactory examination and turn the back of its body towards the marked territories. Another way the Siberian musk deer will mark its territory is by defecating in already marked territories or unclaimed territories.

== Habitat and diet ==
Most Siberian musk deer are generally nocturnal, inhabiting the mountainous taiga and found in shrub-covered slopes where foods are abundant. The rocky location provides crevices and crags for the musk deer to hide from many predators, such as Siberian tiger, Amur leopard, snow leopard, Eurasian lynx, wolf, Red fox, brown bear, Asian black bear, wolverine and yellow-throated marten.

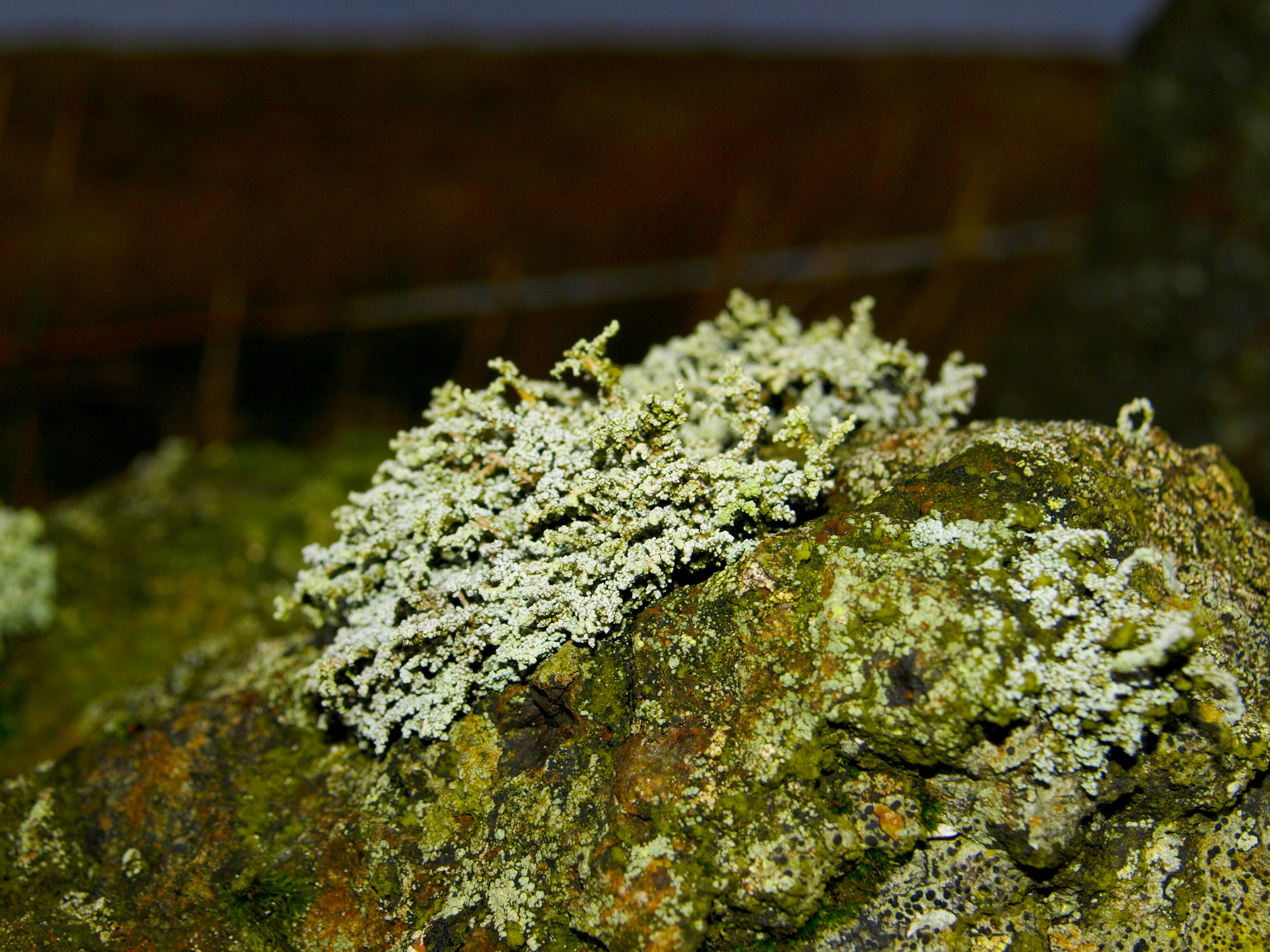
Lichen is the primary food source for the Siberian musk deer.

Musk deer have a preference for easily digestible nutritious foods that are both rich in protein and low in fibre. During periods of winter, musk deer can survive in even poorer food quality ranging in foods that are low in proteins but are high in energy and can be easily digested.

The majority of their diet consists mostly of lichens, pine needles, leaves, and tree barks. During the winter, 99% of the musk deer's diet is lichens. Siberian musk deer have a preference for easily digestible nutritious foods.

== Population size and trends ==
World population: 230,000 ▼ Declining

- Russian Federation, Sakhalin population: 600–500 ▼ Declining
- Russian Federation, the Eastern Siberian population: 27,000–30,000 ▼ Declining
- Russian Federation, Far Eastern population: 150,000 ▼ Declining
- Mongolia: 44,000 ▼ Declining
- China: unknown ▼ Declining
- Democratic People's Republic of Korea: unknown ▼ Declining
- Republic of Korea: unknown ▼ Declining

== Musk chemical composition ==
Siberian musk deer preputial gland secretions are constituted of free fatty acids and phenols (10%), waxes (38%) and steroids. Cholestanol, cholesterol, androsterone, Δ4-3α-hydroxy-17-ketoandrostene, 5β,3α-hydroxy-17-ketoandrostane, 5α,3β,17α-dihydroxyandrostane, 5β,3α,17β-dihydroxyandrostane and 5β,3α,17α-dihydroxyandrostane can be isolated from the steroid fraction. 3-Methylpentadecanone (muscone) was not identified among the secretion lipids.

== Threats ==
The decline of the Siberian musk deer's population began in China where the deer population was most abundant. Most notably in the Sichuan plains, the musk production accounted for 80% of the domestic trade in the 1950s. New sightings of musk deer were later spotted in upper northeast Asia and Russia; these places where the deer were spotted soon opened their own musk markets. After the 1980s, the production begins to steadily decline due to hunting for their musk glands. The cycle of over-harvesting the deer's musk continued until the exploitation severely reduced the musk deer's population.

Another threat comes from the habitat loss by deforestation. For a long period, China cut more of its forest than they could replant. 200 million cm^{3} of China's forest resources were cut down in the past 25 years in order to harvest the timber stock in trade for commerce. Deforestation is a severe threat to the musk deer's long-term survival because the deer can only live in a few areas.

== Conservation action ==
The Siberian musk deer is considered vulnerable, but is slowly declining to endangerment. In Russia, the Siberian musk deer is protected as Very Rare under part 7.1 of the Law of the Mongolian Animal Kingdom (2000) and also under the 1995 Mongolian Hunting Law. The musk deer are also protected under the National Parks, which account for approximately 13% of the Siberian musk deer population.

At the international level, trading musk is controlled through CITES. All trades regarding musk are subject to strict regulation to avoid exploitation of the survival of the deer.
