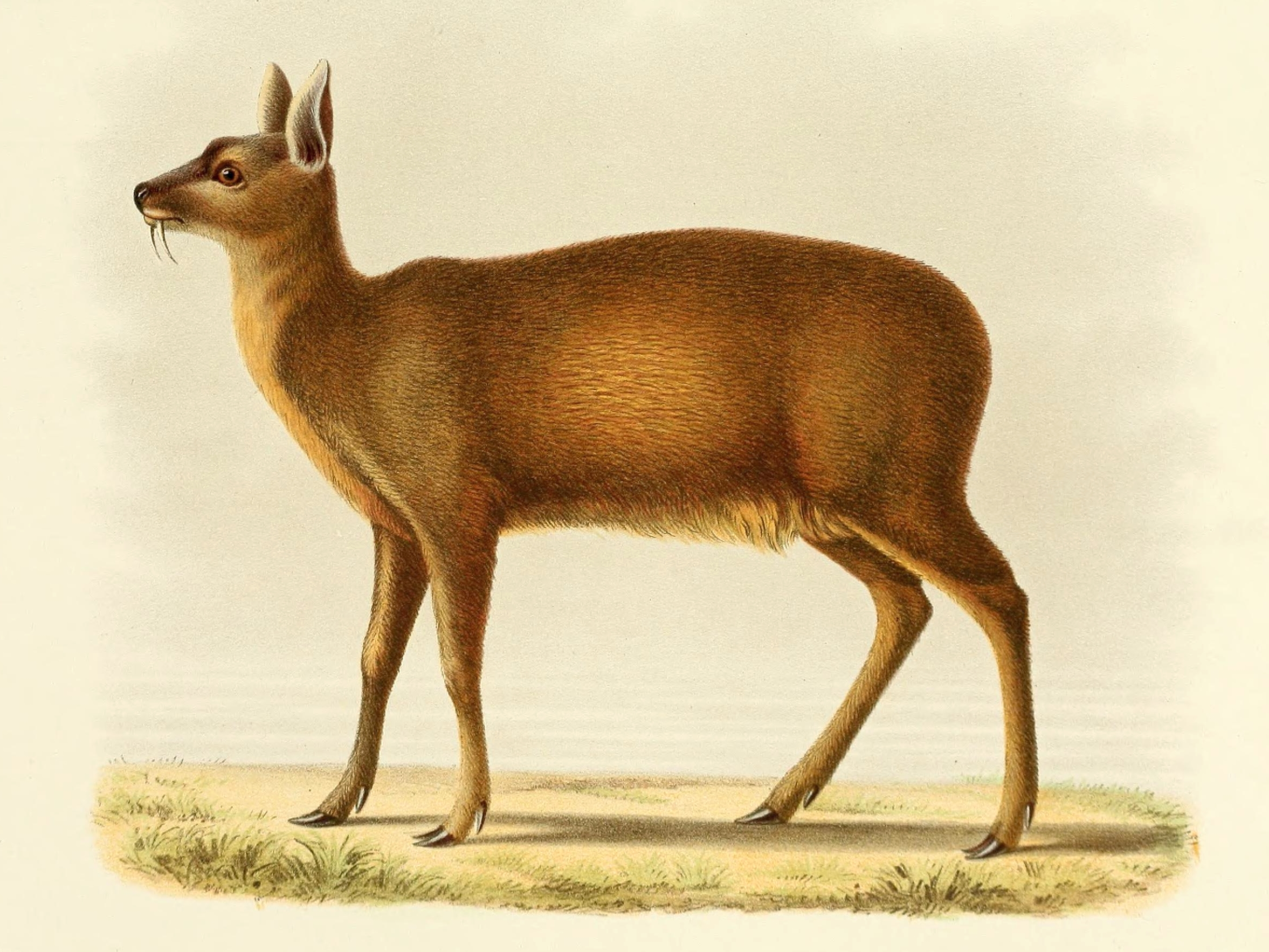
- Illustration of an alpine musk deer

Conservation status
- Endangered (IUCN 3.1)
- CITES Appendix I (Note: Only populations of Afghanistan, Bhutan, India, Myanmar, Nepal, and Pakistan. All other populations are included in Appendix II.)

Scientific classification
- Kingdom: Animalia
- Phylum: Chordata
- Class: Mammalia
- Order: Artiodactyla
- Family: Moschidae
- Genus: Moschus
- Species: M. chrysogaster

Binomial name
- Moschus chrysogaster Hodgson, 1839
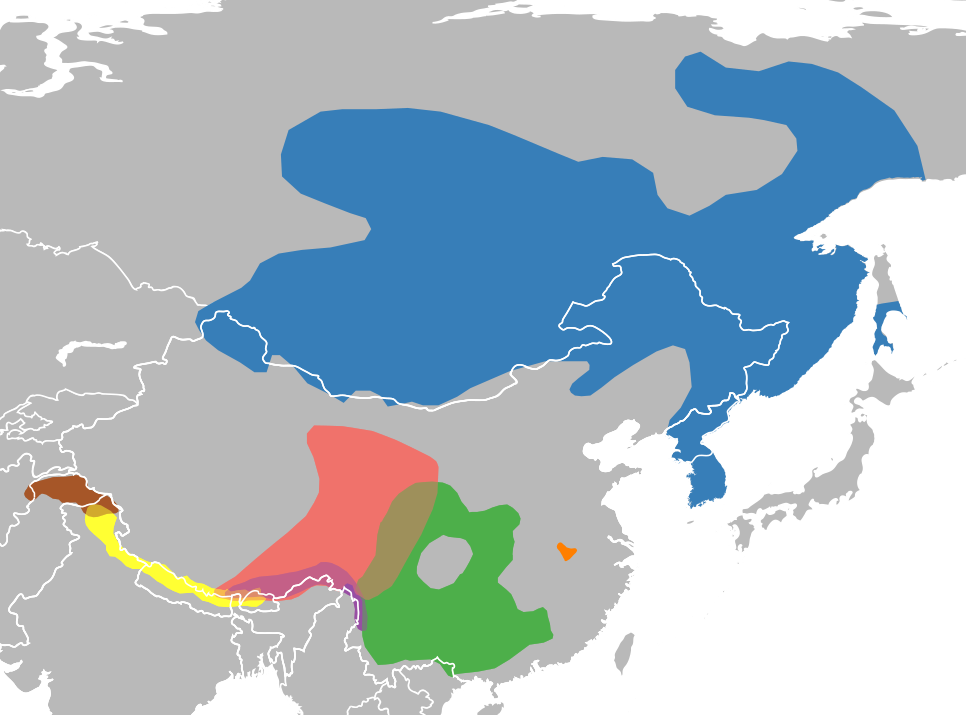
- Moschidae distribution. Moschus chrysogaster in red.

= Alpine musk deer =

Species of musk deer

The alpine musk deer (Moschus chrysogaster) is a musk deer species native to the eastern Himalayas in Nepal, Bhutan and India to the highlands of Tibet.

The alpine musk deer recorded in the Himalayan foothills is now considered a separate species, the Himalayan musk deer.

It is the state animal of Uttarakhand.

== Taxonomy ==
The alpine musk deer belongs to the family Moschidae. This family is part of a clade that includes Bovidae, and Cervidae, which is a sister group to Giraffidae, who are all clustered together with Ruminatia under the order Artiodactyla. Recent studies have shown a relation between Artiodactyls and Cetaceans, combining them into the order Certiodactyla.

Two subspecies are recognized:

- M. c. chrysogaster – Southern Tibet, Himachal Pradesh, Uttarakhand, Sikkim, Nepal and Bhutan
- M. c. sifanicus – Qinghai, Gansu, Ningxia, western Sichuan, and northwestern Yunnan

== Characteristics ==
The alpine musk deer is a small deer (40–60 cm tall) with long upper canines that do not hide within the mouth. It is named for having an externally visible musk sac between male testes. Its fangs grow during mating season and are used for sparring with other males. Alpine musk deer have a larger body size compared to other musk deer.

== Distribution and habitat ==
The alpine musk deer inhabits coniferous and deciduous forests in the mountain regions of western China, Tibet, Sichuan and Gansu at elevations of 3,000–5,000 m (9,800–16,400 ft). In Nepal, it occurs in Khaptad, Sagarmatha, Shey-Phoksundo, Langtang, Makalu Barun National Parks, Annapurna, Kanchenjunga Conservation Areas and Dhorpatan Hunting Reserve. In eastern Bhutan's Sakteng Wildlife Sanctuary, it has been recorded at an elevation of 3,730–4,227 m (12,238–13,868 ft) in 2015.

Mountain caves and shrubs form ideal habitat. In southwestern China's Baima Xueshan Nature Reserve, the alpine musk deer favours oak shrubs, oak forests and open canopy cover.

== Behavior and ecology ==
The alpine musk deer is a ruminant herbivore, foremost a browser and feeds mainly on forbs, grasses, moss, lichens, and shoots, leaves and twigs of shrubs.

Males compete for resources and social rank. Those with the highest rank have primary access to resources such as food, shelter, territory and reproductive rights. Both captive and wild musk deer compete for resources, exhibited in aggressive interactions, during which they butt each other's heads and spray musk as a show of strength and territory marking. Establishing a hierarchy among herd animals often results in physical injury or death for the individuals involved. Captive musk deer show lower intensity of aggression. This involves threatening, displacing and ritual displays. In cases of higher intensity of aggression, a resolution to the conflict is only reached when one deer shows ritual submission, dies or runs away as a form of displacement by the victor.

The mating season of alpine musk deer is late November and the birth season is from June to July. Since they are solitary animals, observing them in captivity is difficult.

== Threats ==
The main threat to the alpine musk deer is poaching for its musk, which is used in cosmetic products. Poaching and continued demand for musk is the main threat in Nepal and Uttarakhand. Musk is also used in Asian medicine. Due to illegal hunting and habitat loss, the alpine musk deer has become an endangered species in China. Habitat destruction lead to reduction of hiding places and increased predation access to the musk deer. Due to human interference the habitat of the alpine musk deer has been fragmented and isolated. Japan has always been the largest importer of musk.

Musk is used in different pharmaceutical products. Even though a synthetic musk has been developed, it hasn't completely replaced the use of natural musk, and the demand is increasing even outside of Asia. The alpine musk deer has been hunted for centuries, but the introduction of guns in the last century lead to increased hunting. The use of snare traps takes a toll on the species, although it is not a target species. Since the demand for musk has increased internationally the supply from musk deer farms has been exceeded, putting even more pressure on the wild population.

== Conservation ==
In 1958, musk deer farms were started in China. By the early 1980s, these farms kept about 3,000 musk deer. Since many of these farms were not successful, only a few breeding centers keep and raise alpine musk deer since the 1990s. There is however little evidence whether and to which extent these farms contributed to the conservation of the species.

=== In captivity ===
Since the alpine musk deer is a solitary, and shy species, it is difficult to breed in captivity. Reports from Chinese musk deer farms show a high mortality rate for captive deer from the wild. Average lifespan in captivity is less than 4 years, opposed to 7–8 years in the wild. Behavioral studies of captive and wild deer have shown a low rate of domestication in captive deer and high success of releasing deer back into the wild who were born in captivity.
