= Preputial gland =

Exocrine gland in the penis or clitoris

Preputial glands are exocrine glands in the prepuce in front of the penis. They occur in many mammals, including canids, mice, ferrets, rhinoceroses, and even-toed ungulates and produce pheromones. The preputial glands of female animals are sometimes called clitoral glands.

Male canids scent-mark their territories with urine and preputial gland secretions. The preputial glands of male musk deer produce strong-smelling deer musk which is of economic importance, as it is used in perfumes.

== Human homologues ==
Preputial gland

Details

Identifiers
- Latin: glandulae preputiales
- TA98: A09.4.01.028
- TA2: 3673
- FMA: 19653

There is debate about whether humans have functional homologues to preputial glands. Preputial glands were first noted by Edward Tyson and in 1694, fully described by William Cowper who named them Tyson's glands after Tyson. They are modified sebaceous glands located around the corona and inner surface of the prepuce of the human penis. They are believed to be most frequently found in the balanopreputial sulcus. Their secretion may be one of the components of smegma.

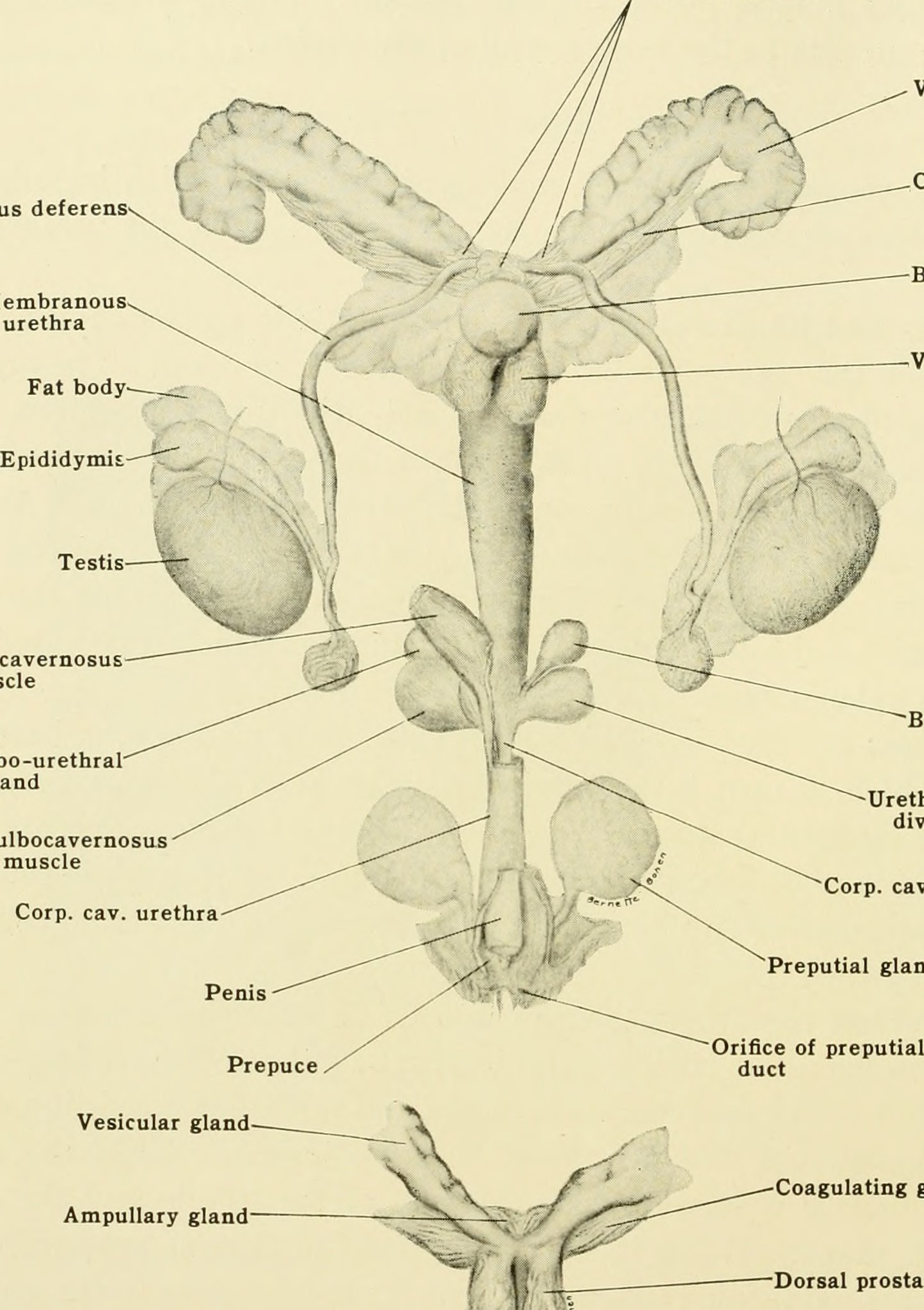
Anatomy of male reproductive system in mouse showing the preputial glands

Some, including Satya Parkash, dispute their existence. While humans may not have true anatomical equivalents, the term may sometimes be used for tiny whitish yellow bumps occasionally found on the glans corona. The proper name for these structures is pearly penile papules (or hirsutoid papillomas). According to detractors, they are not glands, but mere thickenings of the skin and are not involved in the formation of smegma.

== See also ==
- List of specialized glands within the human integumentary system
