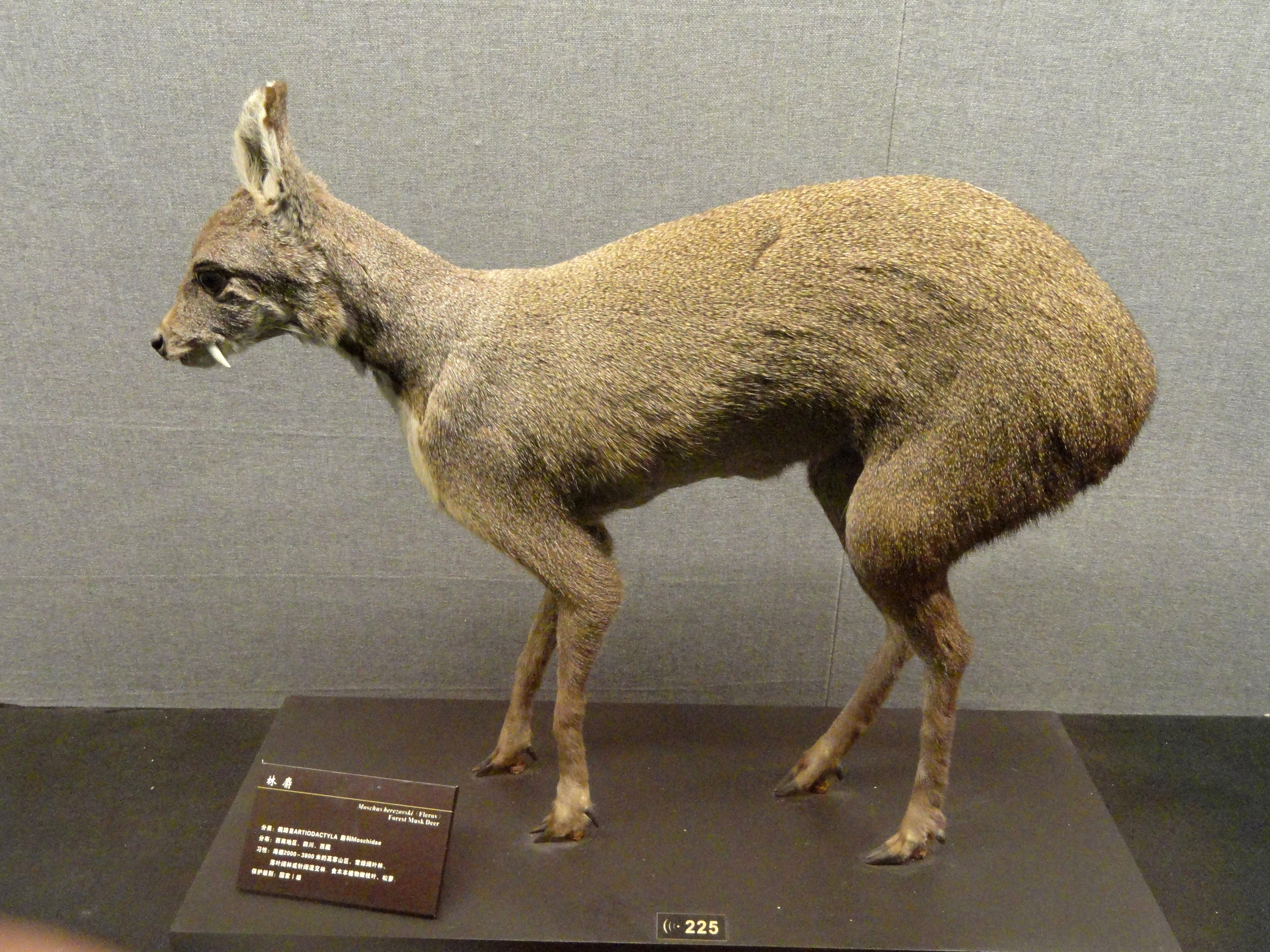
- Taxidermy specimen in the Kunming Natural History Museum of Zoology in the Kunming, Yunnan (China)

Conservation status
- Endangered (IUCN 3.1)
- CITES Appendix I (Note: Only populations of Afghanistan, Bhutan, India, Myanmar, Nepal, and Pakistan. All other populations are included in Appendix II.)

Scientific classification
- Kingdom: Animalia
- Phylum: Chordata
- Class: Mammalia
- Infraclass: Placentalia
- Order: Artiodactyla
- Family: Moschidae
- Genus: Moschus
- Species: M. berezovskii

Binomial name
- Moschus berezovskii Flerov, 1929
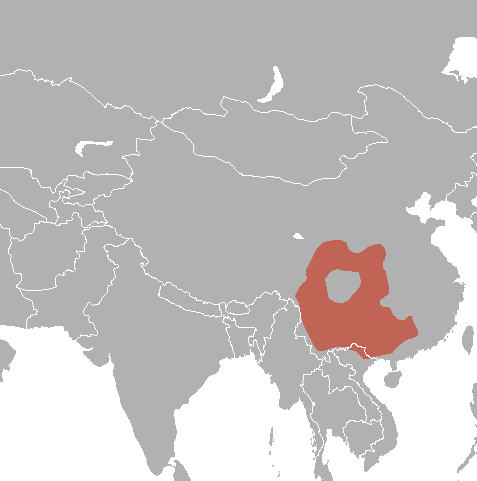
- The distribution map of Moschus berezovskii

= Dwarf musk deer =

Species of mammal

The dwarf musk deer or Chinese forest musk deer (Moschus berezovskii, Chinese: 林麝; pinyin: Lín shè) is an artiodactyl native to southern and central China and northernmost Vietnam. The species name is after the collector Mikhail Mikhailovich Berezovsky. On June 14, 1976, China entered the dwarf musk deer onto its endangered species list. Four subspecies are recognized:

- Moschus berezovskii berezovskii Flerov, 1929
- Moschus berezovskii bijiangensis Wang & Li, 1993
- Moschus berezovskii caobangis Dao, 1969
- Moschus berezovskii yanguiensis Wang & Ma, 1993

== Parasites ==
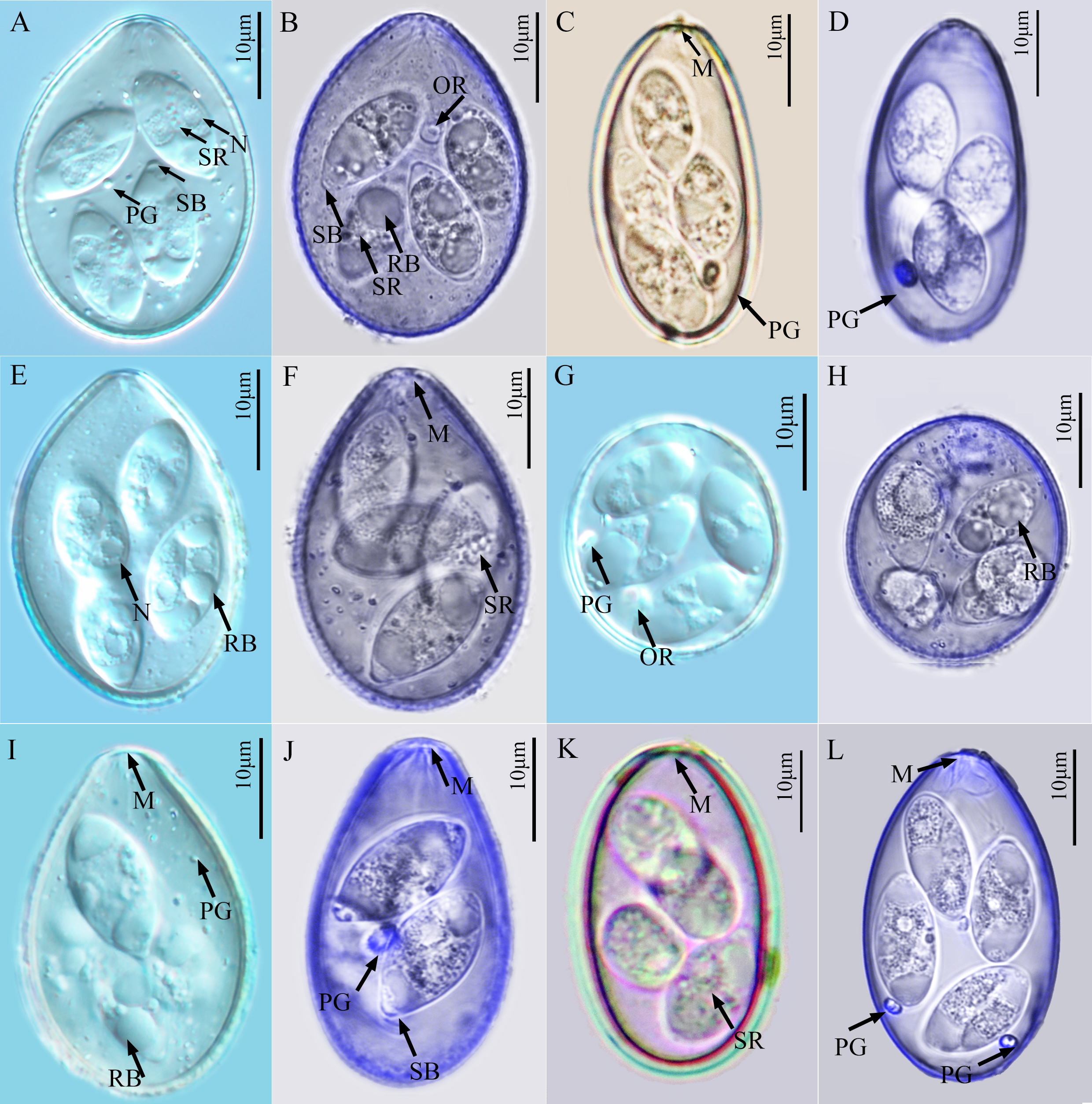
Eimeria spp. from Moschus berezovskii

As most animals, the dwarf musk deer harbours a number of parasites. In 2021, a study showed that ten species of Eimeria, which are apicomplexan protozoans living in the digestive tract, were specific of this host.
