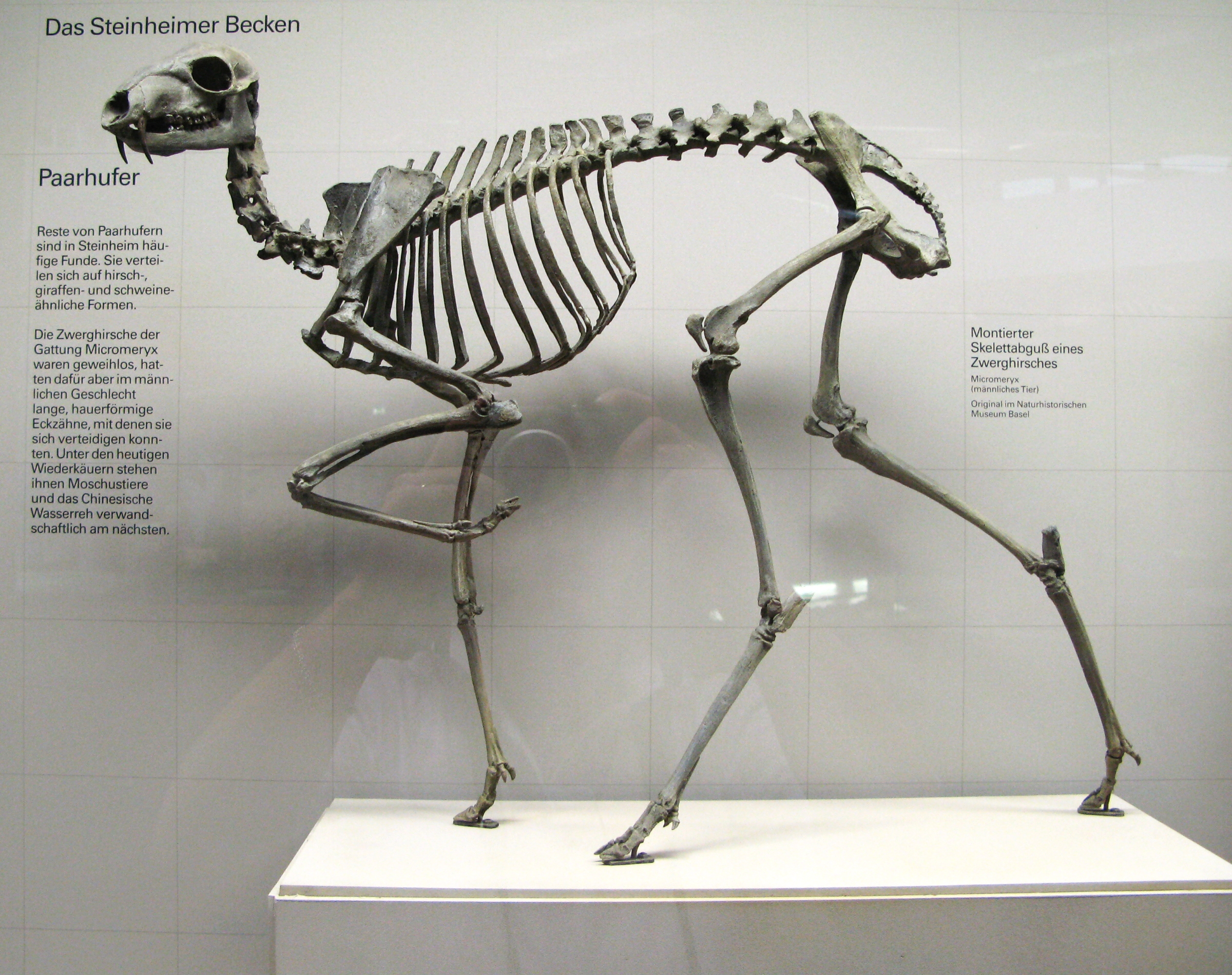
- Male Micromeryx skeleton, Museum am Löwentor, Stuttgart, Germany

Scientific classification
- Kingdom: Animalia
- Phylum: Chordata
- Class: Mammalia
- Order: Artiodactyla
- Family: Moschidae
- Genus: †Micromeryx; Lartet, 1851

Species
- M. flourensianus Lartet 1851; M. azanzae Sánchez and Morales 2008; M.? eiselei Aiglstorfer at al. 2017

= Micromeryx =

Micromeryx Temporal range: Miocene

Extinct genus of deer

Micromeryx is an extinct genus of musk deer that lived during the Miocene epoch (about 16-8 million years ago). Fossil remains were found in Europe and Asia. The earliest record (MN4) of the genus comes from the Sibnica 4 paleontological site near Rekovac in Serbia.

== Characteristics ==
This animal was very similar to the modern musk deer (Moschus moschiferus) of East Asia. However, Micromeryx (its name means "tiny ruminant") was much smaller: it perhaps reached 5 kilograms. Teeth were very similar to those of the extant Cephalophus but more primitive. Like in the present moschids, the males of these animals were equipped with long upper canines, protruding from the mouth when it was closed. The body was slender and short, while the legs were extremely elongated.

== Systematics ==
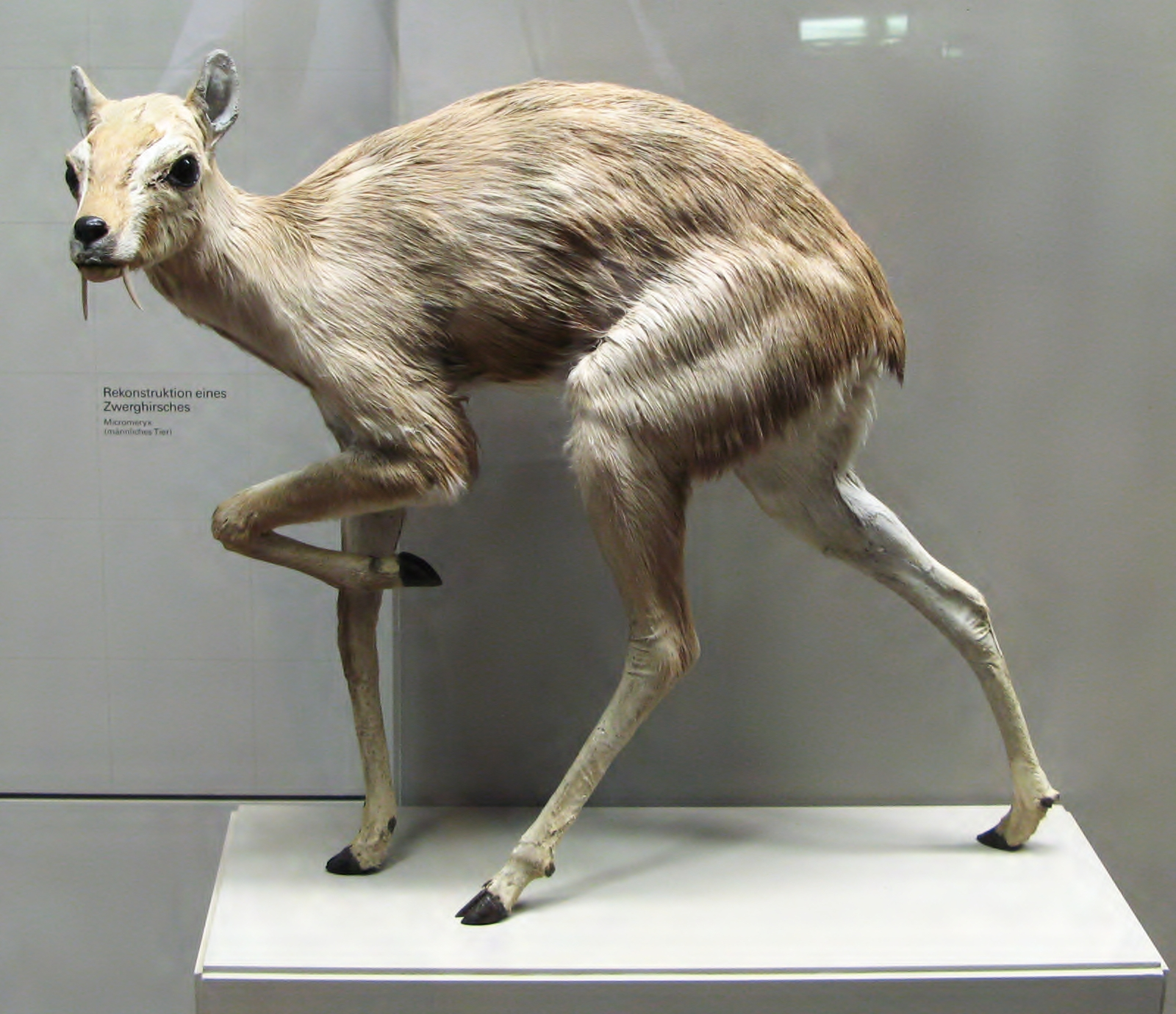
Restoration of Micromeryx, male specimen

Micromeryx was a primitive representative of the moschids, a group of primitive ruminants related to deer and cattle. They had a remarkable expansion during the Miocene and Pliocene and are currently represented by a few species, such as the aforementioned Moschus moschiferus. A somewhat similar animal was Hispanomeryx, which lived in about the same area as Micromeryx but went extinct during the Middle Miocene.

== Distribution ==
Micromeryx probably originated in Western Asia and then spread to Europe and East Asia. Many fossils of this animal have been found in a vast geographical area ranging from Anatolia (Turkey) to Spain and China.

== Palaeoecology ==
Fruit was an important component of the diet of M. flourensianus, with frugivory in this species being supported by evidence from dental microwear, dental mesowear, Sr/Ca ratios, and δ^{13}C and δ^{18}O ratios, whereas the contemporary M.? eiselei was a leaf browser. M. flourensianus was preyed on by Proputorius sansaniensis, Taxodon sansaniensis, and Martes sansaniensis.
