= Uinta Formation =

Geologic formation in Utah, United States

- Stratigraphic range: Eocene
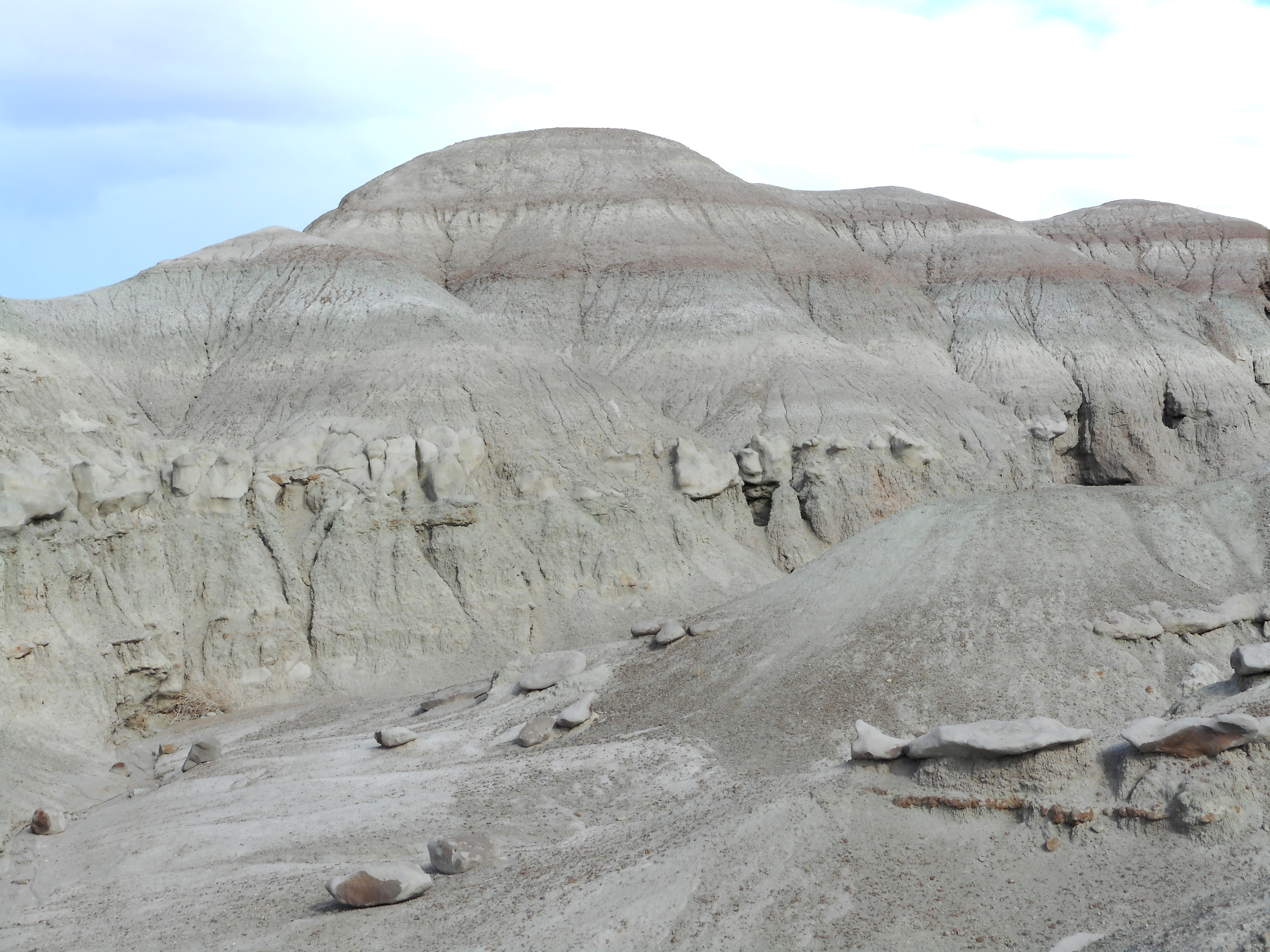
- Characteristic exposure of the Uinta Formation
- Type: Formation

Lithology
- Primary: mudstone and sandstone
- Other: gilsonite

Location
- Region: Utah
- Country: United States

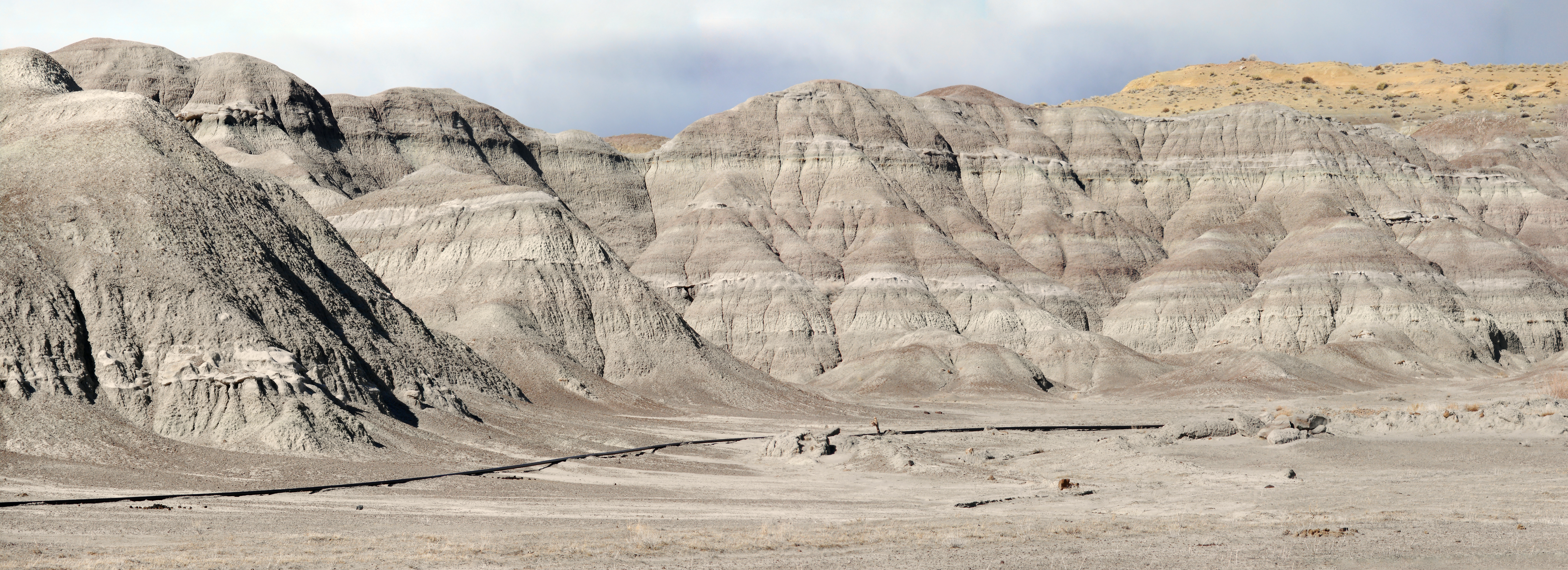
Mudstones of the Uinta Formation (Uinta "C"), Uintah County, Utah.

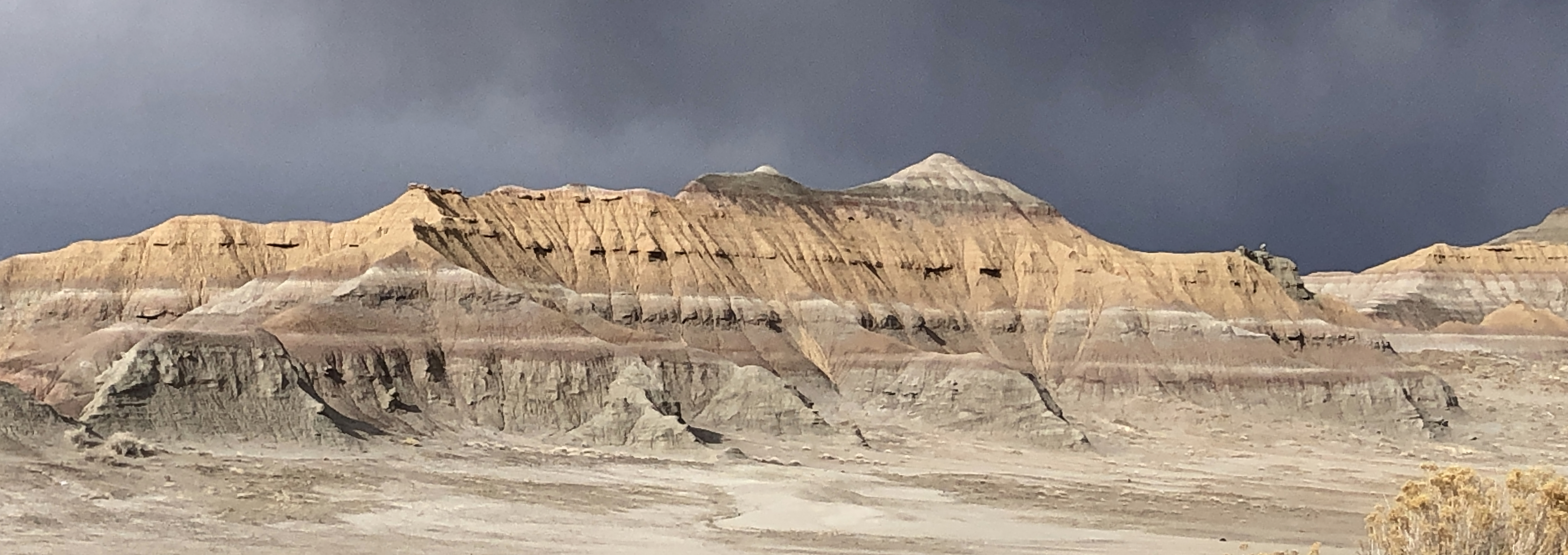
Uinta Formation (Uinta "C"), Uintah County, Utah

The Uinta Formation is a geologic formation in northeastern Utah. The name appears on a geologic map accompanying the Clarence King Fortieth Parallel report for 1876 but not defined until 1878 as the Uinta Group. As defined, it consisted of all Tertiary strata overlying the Green River Formation and was composed of coarse, conglomeratic sandstones, passing up into finer-grained sandstones and calcareous mudstones. Numerous vertebrate fossils were collected and described by Othniel C. Marsh of Yale University. The formation was subsequently subdivided into three informal horizons (A, B, C) based on mammalian fossils. Horace Wood proposed the name Wagonhound Member (from Wagonhound Canyon) for Uinta A+B and Myton Member (from the town of Myton) for Uinta C. However, these names are not based on lithology, but on mammalian vertebrate faunas. For that reason, they have not been accepted as proper lithostratigraphic names.

Members of the Uinta Formation

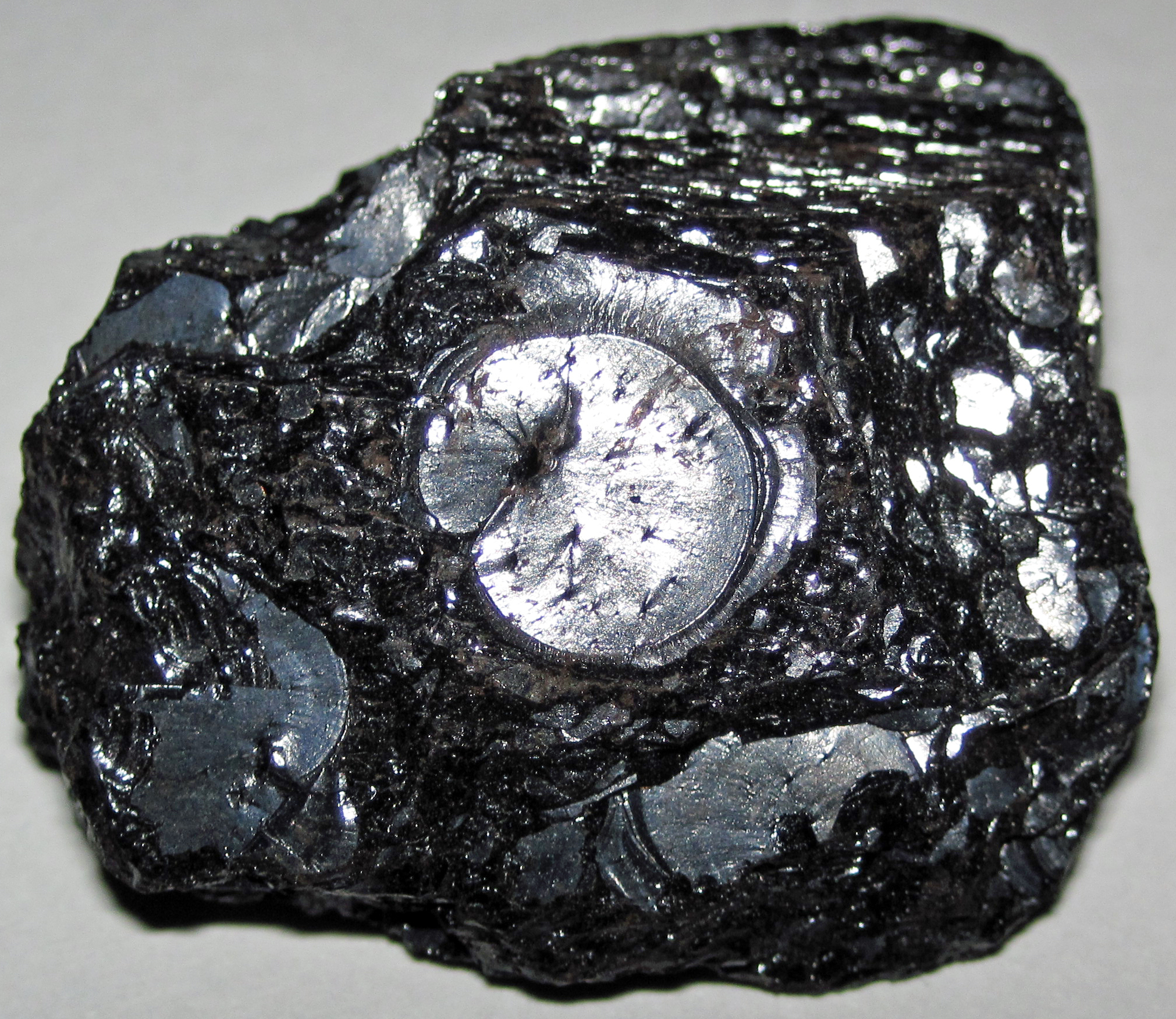
Gilsonite, Gottonwood Dike intruded in the Uinta Formation

Today the formation is subdivided into three informal members:

Member A: Yellowish-gray and yellowish-brown, fine- to very fine grained sandstone and siltstone, with minor amounts of conglomerate, shale, and tuffaceous beds. It intertongues with the underlying Parachute Creek Member of the Green River Formation. It has produced a K-Ar radiometric date 43 Ma.

Member B: Light-gray, light-greenish-gray, light-brown, and light-purple, mudstone and claystone with interbeds of greenish-gray, yellow, and brown fine-grained sandstone, and minor conglomerate and tuffaceous beds. Much of the gilsonite comes from this member in the southern part of the Uinta Basin.

Member C: Soft, light-gray, greenish-gray, white, grayish-purple, red, and pale-yellow shale, mudstone, claystone, and minor sandstone with local tuffaceous interbeds. The eroded sandstones form the strange shaped hoodooes at Fantasy Canyon.

Mammalian Biostratigraphy

Fossil mammals from the Uinta formation define the Uintan North American Land Mammal Age. The index taxa include: Achaenodon, Amynodon, Diplacodon, Eobasileus, Leptotragulus, Oxyaenodon, Oromeryx, Prodaphaenus, Protitanotherium, Protoptychus, Dolichorhinus (= Sphenocoelus), Ourayia, Procynodictis, Metarhinus, Mesomeryx, Bunomeryx, Hylomeryx, and Mytonomeryx. During this interval, primates decline in diversity and relative abundance, primitive perissodactyls were replaced by more advanced forms, such as the Amynododontidae, new artiodactyls appeared, including Oromerycidae, Camelidae, Agriochoeridae, and Protoceratidae. Among rodents, Cylindrodontidae and Eomyidae replaced the Ischyromydidae, and rabbits make their first appearance as the tropical and subtropical habitats began to be replaced by more open habitats.

More recent research has subdivided the Uintan into smaller intervals called biochronological zones (biochrons) based on distinctive suites of mammalian species: early (Ui1), middle (Ui2) and late (Ui3). These biochrons are based on taxa and do not correspond to the three informal members listed above.

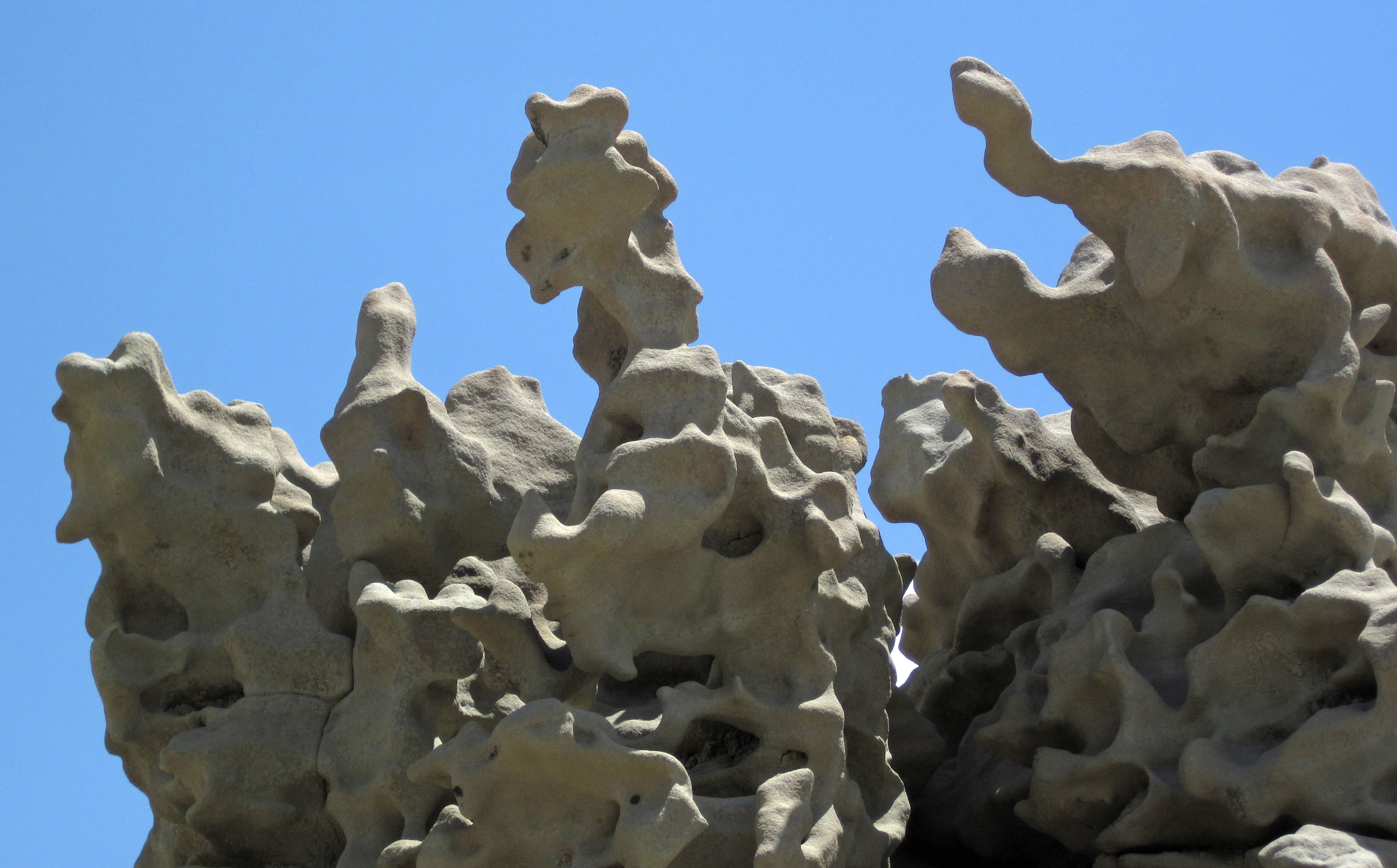
Differentially cemented and eroded sandstone (member C), Fantasy Canyon

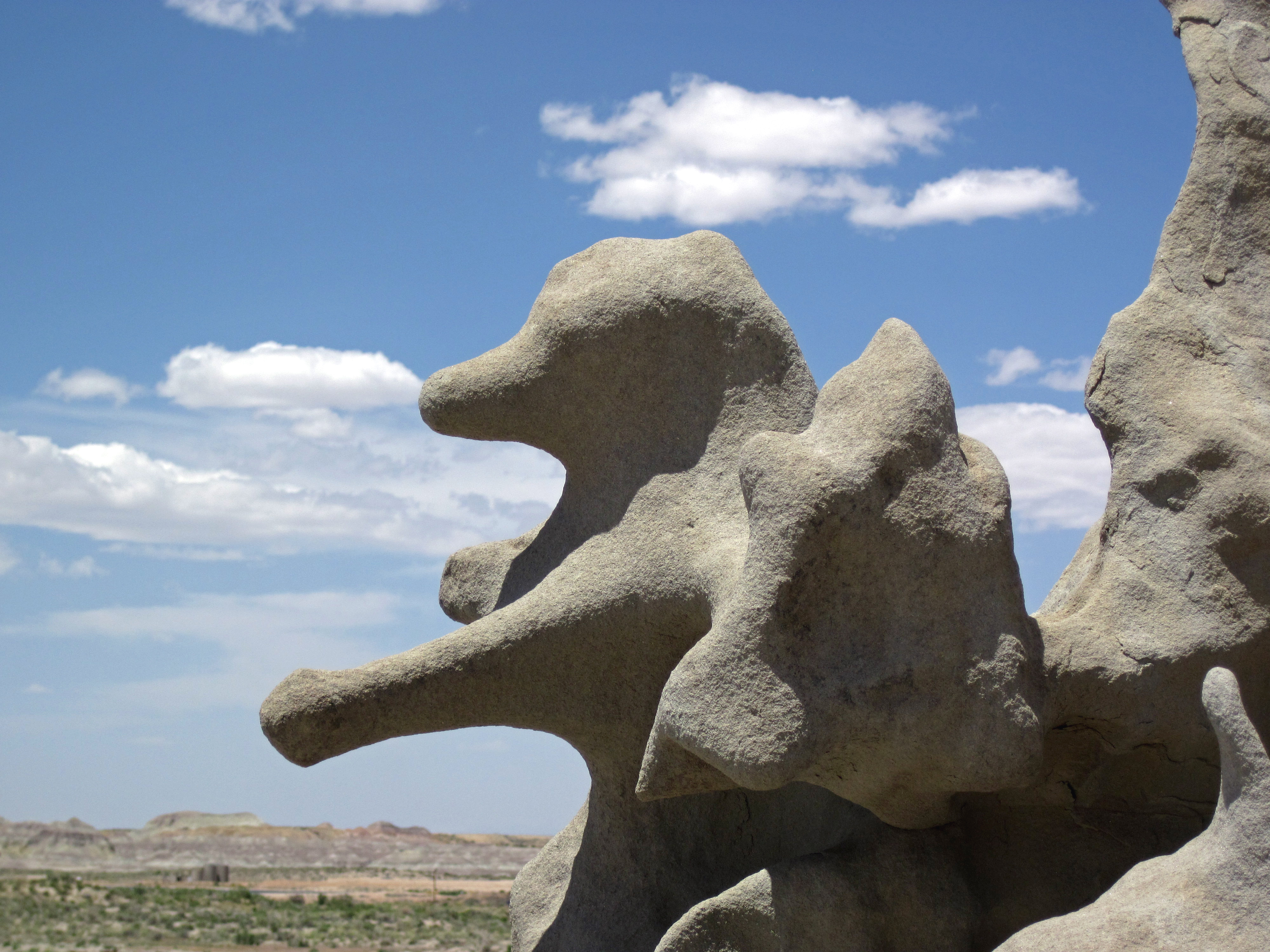

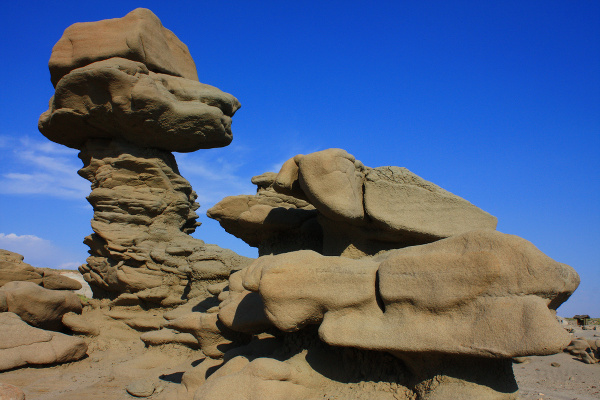

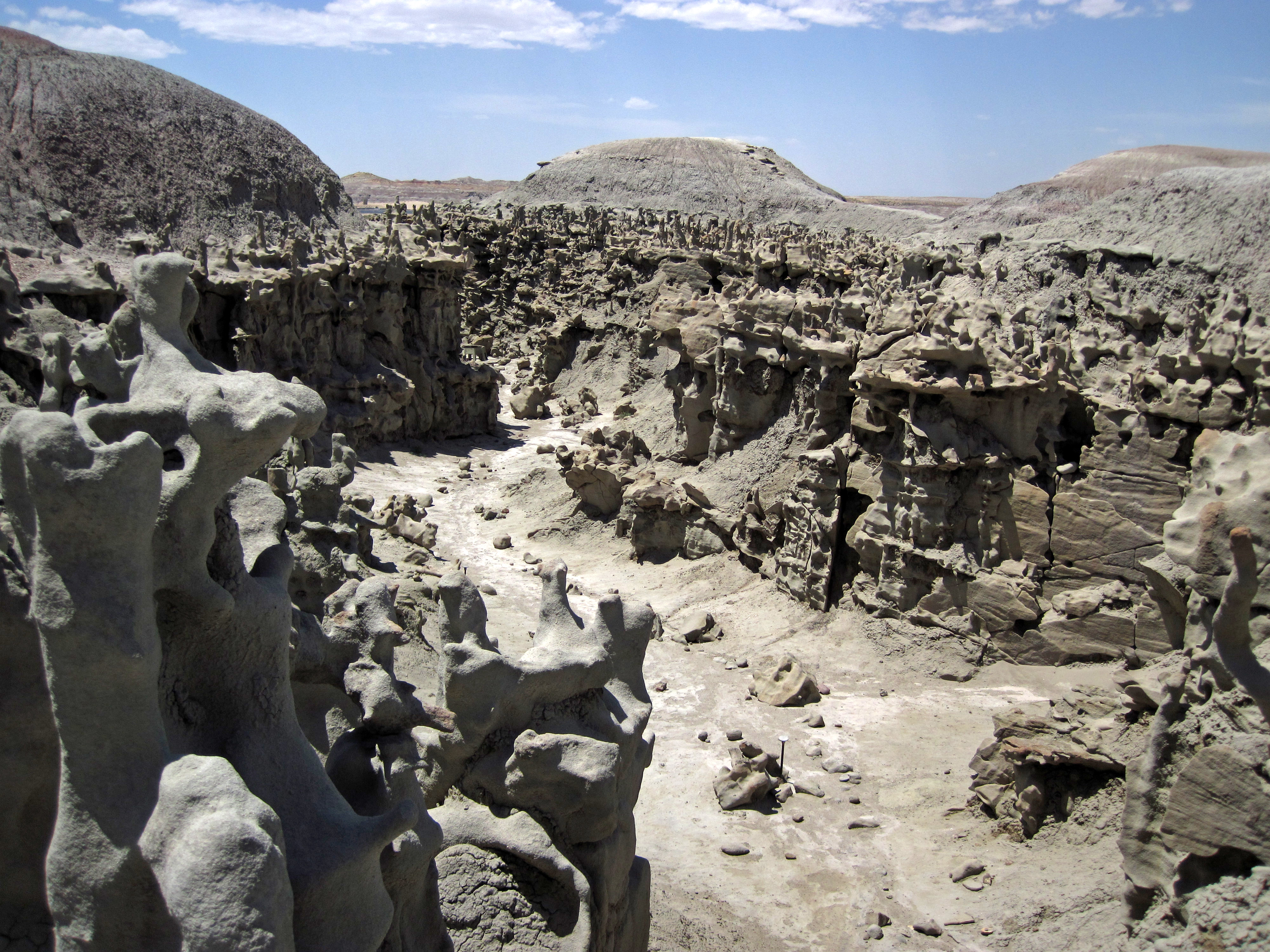

Uinta C in the western part of the Uintah Basin

== See also ==
- List of fossiliferous stratigraphic units in Utah
- Paleontology in Utah
