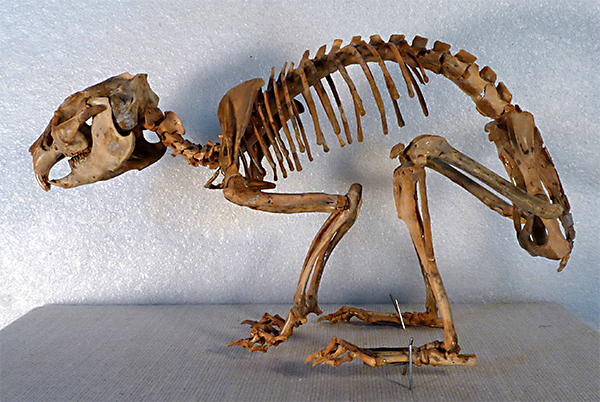
- A Prolagus sardus skeleton
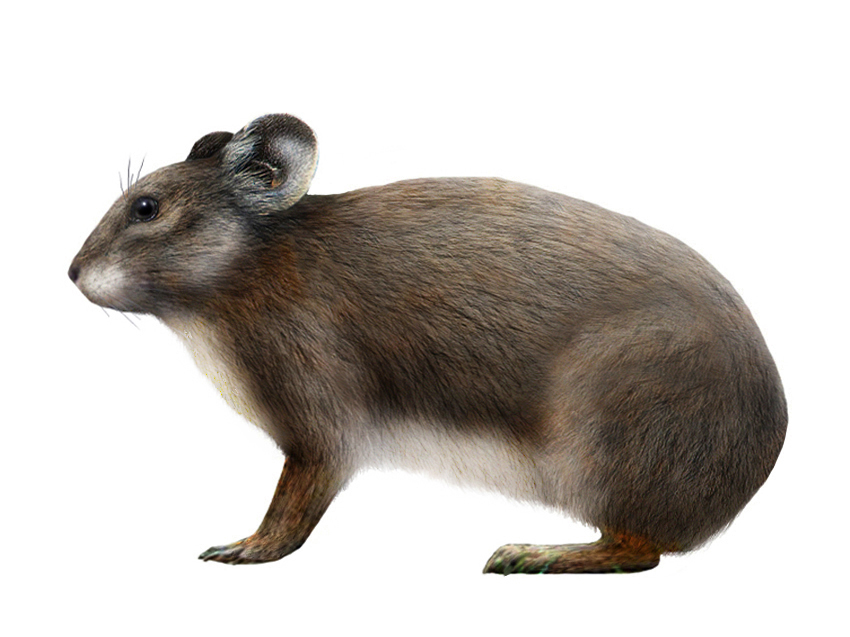
- Reconstruction of Prolagus sardus

Scientific classification
- Kingdom: Animalia
- Phylum: Chordata
- Class: Mammalia
- Order: Lagomorpha
- Family: †Prolagidae
- Genus: †Prolagus; Pomel, 1853

Type species
- †Prolagus oeningensis König, 1825

Species
- See text
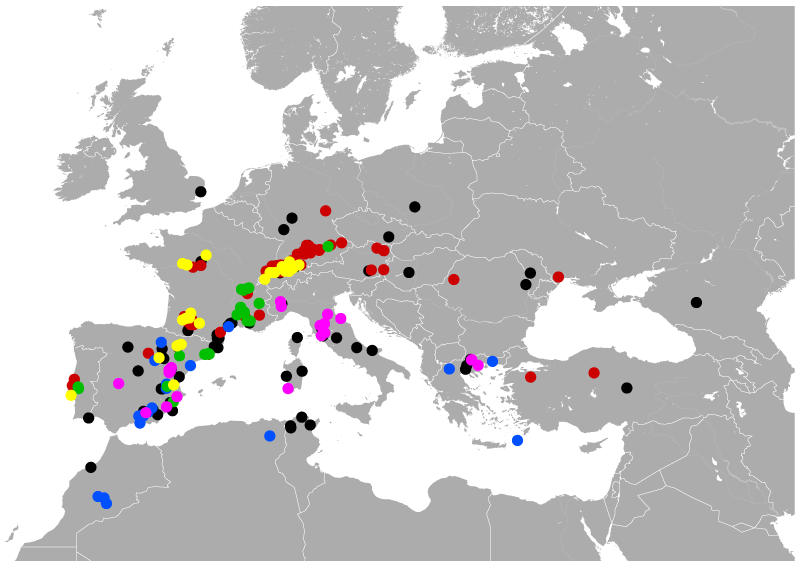
- Prolagus sp. fossils distribution map. P. oeningensis is red, P. michauxi blue, P. crusafonti green, P. sorbinii pink, P. vasconiensis yellow, other Prolagus species including indet. are black. (Note: The coordinates of few additional fossils not listed in the xls file attached to Ge and all paper were taken from the Paleobiology Database. (Note: Ginsburg, L. (1969). "Le plus ancien morse du Monde". Bulletin du Muséum National d'Histoire Naturelle (in French). 41 (4): 995–998. Paleobiology Database: Pontigne 2 (Miocene of France) (les Buissonneaux)) (Note: Antunes, M. T.; Mein, P. (1981). "Vertébrés du miocène moyen de amor (Leiria) - importance stratigraphique". Ciências da Terra (in French). 6: 169–188. Paleobiology Database: Amor, point 1 ("premiere gisement" of Zbyszewski)", Amor, points 2 to 5 (Miocene of Portugal)) (Note: Buffetaut, E.; Crouzel, F.; Juillard, F.; Stigliani, F. (1984). "Le crocodilien longirostre Gavialosuchus dans le Miocene moyen de Polastron (Gers, France)". Geobios. 17 (1): 113–117. Bibcode:1984Geobi..17..113B. doi:10.1016/s0016-6995(84)80009-1. Paleobiology Database: Polastron (Miocene of France)) (Note: Hoyos, M.; Garcia del Cura, M. A.; Ordonyez Martinez, S. (1981). "Caracteristicas geologicas de yacimiento de los Valles de Fuentiduenya (Segovia)". Estudios Geológicos (in Spanish). 37: 345–351. Paleobiology Database: Nivel X-Fisura, Nivel X, Nivel Y, Los Valles de Fuentiduenya (Segovia) (Miocene of Spain)) (Note: Sese Benito, C.; Lopez Martinez, N. (1981). "Los micromammiferos (insectivora, rodentia y lagomorpha) de Vallesiense inferior de Los Valles de Fuentidueña (Segovia, España)". Estudios Geológicos (in Spanish). 37: 369–381. Paleobiology Database: Nivel X-Fisura, Nivel X, Nivel Y, Los Valles de Fuentiduenya (Segovia) (Miocene of Spain)) (Note: Heissig, K. (1989). "Neue Ergebnisse zur Stratigraphie der mittleren Serie der Oberen Süßwassermolasse Bayerns (New results on the stratigraphy of the middle series of upper Freshwater Molasse, Bavaria)". Geologica Bavarica (in German). 94: 239–257. Paleobiology Database: Ziemetshausen 1b, 1a (Miocene of Germany)) (Note: L. Abbazzi; C. Angelone; M. Arca; G. Barisone; C. Bedetti; M. Delfino; T. Kotsakis; F. Marcolini; M. R. Palombo; M. Pavia; P. Piras; L. Rook; D. Torre; C. Tuveri; A. M. F. Valli; B. Wilkens (2004). "Plio-Pleistocene fossil vertebrates of Monte Tuttavista (Orosei, Eastern Sardinia, Italy), an overview". Rivista Italiana di Paleontologia e Stratigrafia (in Italian). 110 (3): 681–706. Paleobiology Database: Fissure 7, Blocco Strada Quarry (VII bl. St.), Fissure 7, Mustelide Quarry (VII Mustelide), Fissure 6, Quarry 3 (VI 3), Fissure 10, Ghiro Quarry (X Ghiro) (Pliocene of Italy), Fissure 11, Antilope Quarry, (XI antilope), Fissure 6, Banco 6 Quarry, (VI Banco 6), Fissure 7, Quarry 2, (VII 2), Fissure 10, 3 Uccelli Quarry, (X 3 uccelli), Fissure 11, canide Quarry, (XI canide), Fissure 9, Prolagus Quarry, (IX Prolagus), Fissure 11, dic.2001, (XI dic.2001), Fissure 11, Quarry 3, (XI 3), Fissure 11, Rondone Quarry, (XI rondone), Fissure 4, Quarry 5 Prolagus, (IV 5 prol.), Fissure 4, Quarry 20, (IV 20) (Pleistocene of Italy)) (Note: Ginsburg, L.; Bonneau, M. (1995). "La succession des faunes de mammiferes miocenes de Pontigne (Maine-et-Loire, France)". Bulletin du Muséum National d'Histoire Naturelle (in French). 4 (2–4): 313–328. Paleobiology Database: [https://paleobiodb.org/cgi-bin/bridge.pl?a=basicCollectionSearch&collection_no=148396 Pontigne 4 (marine) (Miocene of France) (les Buissoneaux)) (Note: Böttcher, R.; Heizmann, E. P. J.; Rasser, M. W; Ziegler, R. (2009). "Biostratigraphy and palaeoecology of a Middle Miocene (Karpathian, MN 5) fauna from the northern margin of the North Alpine Foreland Basin (Oggenhausen 2, SW' Germany)". Neues Jahrbuch für Geologie und Paläontologie, Abhandlungen. 254 (1/2): 237–260. doi:10.1127/0077-7749/2009/0011. Paleobiology Database: Oggenhausen 2 (Miocene of Germany)) (Note: Additional contributors to utilized records of Paleobiology Database (authorizers supplying these records) include Johannes Mueller, Philip Mannion, Mark Uhen, John Alroy, Alan Turner.))

= Prolagus =

Prolagus Temporal range: Burdigalian–Holocene

Extinct genus of mammals

Prolagus is an extinct genus of lagomorph. Over 20 species have been named, and the genus was abundant and widespread in Europe during the Neogene. However, by the end of the Middle Pleistocene, it was confined to a single species, the Sardinian pika (P. sardus), on Corsica, Sardinia, and their surrounding islands, where it survived into historical times. In North Africa and Western Asia, the genus is known from the Miocene and Pliocene. The scientific name may mean "before hares" or "primitive hares" (pro- meaning "before" and lagos meaning "hare"). Its taxonomy is disputed, with it either being considered a member of the family Ochotonidae, which includes living pikas, or the only member of the family Prolagidae.

== Taxonomy ==
Prolagus was first named by Auguste Pomel in 1853. Prolagus has been considered by most taxonomists to be a member of the pika family Ochotonidae, but distinct from living pikas, which all belong to the genus Ochotona. Erbaleva in 1988 suggested it represented the only member of the monotypic family Prolagidae due to its distinct dental formula; this proposal was considered invalid by Nieves López Martínez, due to the fact that many mammal families have lineages with distinct dental formulae. However, many authorities such as the IUCN Red List and American Society of Mammalogists accept Prolagidae as valid. Analysis of a partial mitochondrial genome of Prolagus sardus suggests that it is more closely related to Ochotona than to Leporidae (which contains rabbits and hares), with an estimated divergence between Prolagus and Ochotona about 30 million years ago.

- Glires
  - Rodentia
  - Lagomorpha
    - Leporidae (rabbits and hares)
    - - †Prolagus sardus (Sardinian pika)
      - Ochotona (living pikas)

== Description ==
Prolagus is distinguished by a continuously growing dentition, a lack of a lower third molar, a trilobed second lower molar and unusually shaped premolars, with additional cusps in the lower third premolar. In comparison to modern pikas of the genus Ochotona, they have one less dorsal vertebra in the spinal column. Most species of Prolagus probably weighed around 500 grams (1.1 lb), similar to a living pika. A specimen with preserved soft-tissue is known from late Miocene aged deposits from Andance in France, which shows that its overall proportions, shape of the ears and lack of tail are similar to living Ochotona.

== Species ==
Over 20 species of Prolagus have been named.

Species	Author and year	Temporal range	Location	Notes & description
P. oeningensis	König, 1825	late-Middle Miocene	Germany	
P. sardus	Wagner, 1829	Middle Pleistocene-Holocene	Sardinia, Corsica, and surrounding islands	
P. calpensis	F. Major, 1905	Pliocene	Gibraltar	
P. vasconiensis	Viret, 1930	Early Miocene	France	
P. bilobus	Heller, 1936	Pliocene	Germany	
P. osmolskae	Fostowicz-Frelik, 2010	Pliocene	Poland	Has been considered a junior synonym of P. bilobus
P. crusafonti	Lopez-Martinez, 1975	Late Miocene	Spain	
P. michauxi	Lopez-Martinez, 1975	Pliocene	France	
P. ibericus	Lopez-Martinez, 1975	Pliocene	Spain	
P. figaro	Lopez-Martinez, 1975	Pliocene	Sardinia and Corsica	
P. depereti	Lopez-Martinez, 1975	Pliocene	France	Originally described as a subspecies of P. figaro
P. schnaitheimensis	Tobien, 1975	early-Middle Miocene	Germany	
P. tobieni	Lopez-Martinez, 1977	late-Middle Miocene	Spain	
P. major	Lopez-Martinez, 1977	late-Middle Miocene	Spain	
P. praevasconiensis	Ringeade, 1978	Early Miocene	France	
P. apricenicus	Mazza, 1987	Late Miocene	Italy	Part of endemic Gargano island fauna
P. imperialis	Mazza, 1987	Late Miocene	Italy	Part of endemic Gargano island fauna
P. sorbini	Massini, 1989	Latest Miocene	Italy	
P. aguilari	Lopez-Martinez, 1997	early Middle Miocene	France	
P. fortis	Lopez-Martinez et Sese, 1990	Early Miocene	Spain	
P. caucasicus	Averianov et Tesakov, 1998	Pliocene	Russia	
P. pannonicus	Angelone & Čermák, 2015	Late Miocene	Hungary	
P. latiuncinatus	Angelone & Čermák, 2015	Late Miocene	Hungary	
P. italicus	Angelone, 2008	Pliocene	Italy	
P. migrans	Sen & Geraads, 2023	Pliocene-Pleistocene	Morocco	

== Evolutionary history and ecology ==
Prolagus likely evolved from the Oligocene-earliest Miocene genus Piezodus. The distribution of Prolagus between 20-8 million years ago extends from the Iberian Peninsula in the west to Anatolia in the east, extending as far north as central Germany, though it was absent from the Italian Peninsula. Early Prolagus species are thought to have inhabited subtropical swamp and wetland environments, with a similar ecology to the living marsh rabbit (Sylvilagus palustris). In many European Miocene localities remains of Prolagus are extraordinarily abundant, and Prolagus species probably played a key role as prey for many predators. During the late Miocene, Prolagus dispersed into North Africa due to the connection between Africa and Europe as a result of the Messinian salinity crisis. The range of Prolagus shifted southwards and substantially contracted outside of North Africa during the Pliocene, due to climatic cooling and increasing aridity, though the genus reached its highest species richness at 9 species due to habitat fragmentation leading to speciation. Prolagus first arrived in Corsica, Sardinia, and other Mediterranean islands at the early-late Pliocene boundary, likely due to an emergent land connection. The earliest remains of Prolagus on the islands are represented by the species P. figaro, ancestral to P. sardus. Among the last continental species of Prolagus is P. calpensis from the Early-Middle Pleistocene of the Iberian Peninsula. By the beginning of the Late Pleistocene, Prolagus was confined to the single species P. sardus on Corsica, Sardinia and surrounding islands. While decline of the distribution Prolagus on the mainland of the continents was primarily driven by climatic change, the cause of the final extinction of the mainland Prolagus species is unclear, but one factor suggested is increased predation pressure. The Sardinian pika probably became extinct sometime between 393 BC (the timing of the last reliable radiocarbon date) and the 6th century AD, likely due to introductions of invasive species by humans.
