= Prolagus osmolskae =

Prolagus osmolskae Temporal range: Pliocene

Scientific classification
- Domain: Eukaryota
- Kingdom: Animalia
- Phylum: Chordata
- Class: Mammalia
- Order: Lagomorpha
- Family: †Prolagidae
- Genus: †Prolagus
- Species: †P. osmolskae

Binomial name
- †Prolagus osmolskae Fostowicz-Frelik, 2010

Extinct species of mammal

Prolagus osmolskae is an extinct species in the genus Prolagus. It may have resembled a pika.

== Range ==
This species was the northernmost record of Prolagus. Unlike other members of its genus, Prolagus osmolskae did not live near the Mediterranean Sea. Instead, this species lived in Poland.

== Nomenclature ==
This species was named in honour of Professor Halszka Osmólska.
