= Blastomeryx =

Blastomeryx Temporal range: Early to Middle Miocene 20.4–10.3 Ma
- Blastomeryx skeleton

Scientific classification
- Kingdom: Animalia
- Phylum: Chordata
- Class: Mammalia
- Order: Artiodactyla
- Family: Moschidae
- Subfamily: †Blastomerycinae
- Genus: †Blastomeryx; Cope, 1877

Species
- B. cursor Cook 1934; B. gemmifer Cope 1874; B. vigoratus Hay 1924

Synonyms
- B. elegans; B. francesca; B. medius; B. mollis; B. pristinus; B. tantillus

Extinct genus of deer

Blastomeryx is an extinct genus of musk deer endemic to North America. It lived during the Miocene epoch 20.4—10.3 million years ago, existing for approximately 10 million years. There may be only one species, Blastomeryx gemmifer.

== Description ==
Blastomeryx was 75 centimetres (30 in) long and looked like a modern chevrotain. Its canines were elongated into tusks which it probably used to uproot plants and fend off predators. While Blastomeryx (as well as modern musk deer) lacked antlers, a Middle Miocene species had bony knobs on its skull, which have been interpreted as incipient horns. Blastomeryx had a reduced radius and ulna, as well as fully formed cannon bones, like modern deer.

== History ==
In older literature, Blastomeryx has been placed within Cervidae proper, though this affinity is generally not believed. Edward Drinker Cope and William Diller Matthew were of the belief that Blastomeryx descended from Hypertragulids, assuming the genus was indigenous and not a result of any migration.
