= Karydomys =

Karydomys Temporal range: Miocene

Scientific classification
- Kingdom: Animalia
- Phylum: Chordata
- Class: Mammalia
- Order: Rodentia
- Family: Cricetidae
- Subfamily: †Democricetodontinae
- Genus: †Karydomys; Theocharopoulos, 2000

Type species
- Karydomys symeonidisi

Species
- See text

Extinct genus of rodents

Karydomys is a genus of fossil Eurasian hamster-like rodents in the subfamily Democricetodontinae from the Langhian stage in the middle Miocene epoch.

== Species ==
- Karydomys boskosi, C.D. Theocharopoulos 2000, found in Greece
- Karydomys debruijni, found in China
- Karydomys dzerzhinskii, Kordikova & De Bruijn, 2001, found in Kazakhstan
- Karydomys symeonidisi
- Karydomys wigharti, found in Germany
- Karydomys zapfei
