= Prolagus imperialis =

Prolagus imperialis Temporal range: Early Pliocene

Scientific classification
- Domain: Eukaryota
- Kingdom: Animalia
- Phylum: Chordata
- Class: Mammalia
- Order: Lagomorpha
- Family: †Prolagidae
- Genus: †Prolagus
- Species: †P. imperialis

Binomial name
- †Prolagus imperialis Mazza, 1987

Species of mammal

Prolagus imperialis is an extinct species in the genus Prolagus. It was one of the species in this genus that were recently discovered. Prolagus imperialis may have resembled a pika.

== Nomenclature ==
Prolagus imperialis was named after Poggio Imperiale, the place where its fossils were discovered. Its name might mean "first rabbit of Poggio Imperiale".

== Size ==
Prolagus imperialis is larger than the species which was discovered along with it, Prolagus apricenicus. Also, Prolagus imperialis is the largest of all Prolagidae, weighing about 5 kilograms (11 lb).
