= Tethytragus =

Tethytragus Temporal range: Miocene

Scientific classification
- Kingdom: Animalia
- Phylum: Chordata
- Class: Mammalia
- Order: Artiodactyla
- Family: Bovidae
- Genus: †Tethytragus; Azanza & Morales, 1994

Species
- †Tethytragus koehlerae Azanza & Morales, 1994; †Tethytragus langai Azanza & Morales, 1994; †Tethytragus stehlini (Thenius, 1951)

Extinct genus of mammals

Tethytragus was a genus of caprine bovid that lived in the Middle and Late Miocene.

== Geographic range ==
Fossils of the genus have been found in Spain and Turkey.

== Palaeoecology ==
Tethytragus was a grazer or a mixed feeder in its feeding habits. Dental microwear and mesowear analyses of T. langai give conflicting evidence as to its dietary habits; the latter suggests an exclusively grazing diet while the former suggests mixed feeding habits; the totality of the evidence suggests the species was a mixed feeder on the grazing end of the spectrum between browsers and grazers. Paired ^{87}Sr/^{86}Sr, δ^{18}O_{CO3}, and δ^{13}C measurements from the tooth enamel of Tethytragus sp. from the Middle Miocene site of Gratkörn in Austria show it to have been a canopy browser that exclusively ingested C_{3} plants.
