= Oriomeryx =

Oriomeryx Temporal range: Miocene

Scientific classification
- Kingdom: Animalia
- Phylum: Chordata
- Class: Mammalia
- Order: Artiodactyla
- Family: Moschidae
- Genus: †Oriomeryx; Ginsburg, 1985
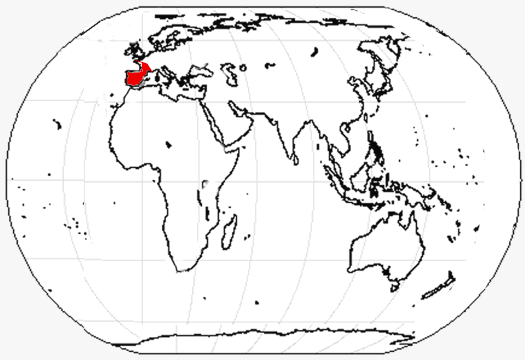
- Range of Oriomeryx based on fossil finds

Extinct genus of deer

Oriomeryx is an extinct genus of the family Moschidae, endemic to Europe from the early Miocene epoch, approximately 20 Ma. Fossils are known only from a single site in Zaragoza, Spain.
