= Democricetodontinae =

Democricetodontinae Temporal range: Miocene

Scientific classification
- Domain: Eukaryota
- Kingdom: Animalia
- Phylum: Chordata
- Class: Mammalia
- Order: Rodentia
- Family: Cricetidae
- Subfamily: †Democricetodontinae; Lindsay, 1987

Genera
- Democricetodon; Karydomys; Spanocricetodon

Extinct subfamily of rodents

The Democricetodontinae are a subfamily of fossil rodents from Miocene epoch.

The Democricetodontini were named as a paraphyletic taxon within the Cricetidae by Lindsay in 1987. It was reranked as a subfamily by Theocharopoulos in 2000.

== See also ==
- Fauna of Africa
