= Nieves López Martínez =

Spanish paleontologist

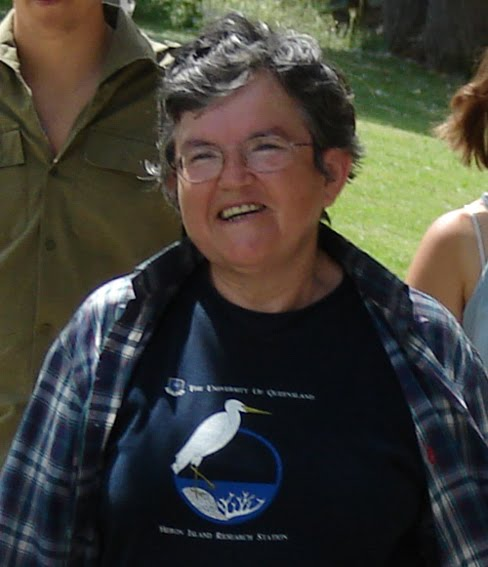
- Born: February 5, 1949; Burgos, Spain
- Died: December 25, 2010 (aged 61); Madrid, Spain
- Education: Complutense University of Madrid (BA/BS equivalent) University of Montpellier (MS equivalent) (PhD)
- Scientific career
- Fields: Paleontology, education
- Workplaces: Autonomous University of Madrid (1978-1982); Complutense University of Madrid (since 1983)

Nieves López Martínez (Burgos, 5 February 1949 - Madrid, 15 December 2010) was a Spanish paleontologist specializing in research on the vertebrate fossil record and part of a group of paleontologists who were responsible for the modernization of paleontological studies in Spain.

López Martínez studied at Complutense University of Madrid, graduating in Biological Sciences in 1970. She received a scholarship to do her PhD work, under the supervision of Dr. Louis Thaler at the University of Montpellier.

López Martínez was recognized as a leading figure in the study of the evolution of Cenozoic lagomorphs, as well as the Cretaceous–Paleogene extinction event in the area of the Pyrenees. She was also very involved with university teaching programs, both officially at the Complutense University of Madrid and through various projects, such as the Somosaguas Paleontology Project, which was associated with the Somosaguas paleontological site.

== Education ==
Nieves López began her secondary education on the Complutense University of Madrid, where she obtained a Biological Science degree in 1970. Her connection to her specialized field of study, and to Paleontology in general began in this institution; under Emiliano Aguirre, she began her studies of Lagomorphs (which is the taxonomic determination for pikas, rabbits, and hares).

She obtained a French Cooperation Grant to the University of Montpellier from 1971–1973, years in which she developed he PhD thesis under Dr. Louis Thaler. In 1972, at the institution, she obtained a Diplome d'Etudes Approfondus (DEA) and presented her doctoral thesis in 1974.

Returning to Spain in 1974, she worked under a PFPI pre-doctoral grant at the Lucas Mallada Institute at the Complutense University, obtaining a Doctorate of Science in Geology in 1977. This thesis was awarded an Extraordinary Doctorate Award by the University Faculty.

== Career ==
Her work as an educator of science began in 1978, where she taught at the Autonomous University of Madrid (UAM) as an Interim Associate Professor from 1978 to 1982. She later moved back to her alma mater of UCM as a Numerary Associate Professor, and was awarded a Cátedra (a professorship position) in Paleontology in 1983. She specialized in courses covering Vertebrate Paleontology and Paleobiogeography.

== Publications and other works ==
López Martínez worked heavily on expanding the outreach and education that Paleontology had in the Spanish sphere, it was mentioned that she led multiple workshops and dissemination of her work to the general public. Two of her most tangible contributions would be that of the publication of her multiple works, which became a basis for the early paleontological study in Spain and served as fundamental pieces in the specialized study of Lagomorphs [citation], as well as her contribution to several blogs of science in 2006, a development in communicating science that was uncommon in Spain at the time.

=== Publications ===
- Santonja, M.; López Martínez, N. y Pérez González, A. (Eds.) (1980). Ocupaciones Achelenses en el valle del Jarama (Arganda, Madrid). Publ. Exma. Diputación Prov. Madrid. Arqueología y paleoecología, 1: 341 p. ISBN 978-84-500-3554-4
- López Martínez, N. (Coord.) (1986). Guía de campo de los fósiles de España. Editorial Pirámide. 479 p. ISBN 84-368-0326-4
- López Martínez, N. (1989). Revisión sistemática y biostratigráfica de los Lagomorpha (Mammalia) del Terciario y Cuaternario de España. Memorias del Museo Paleontológico de la Universidad de Zaragoza, 3(3); Colección Paleontología y Arqueología, 9: 350 p. ISBN 84-7753-093-9
- López Martínez, N. y Truyols Santonja, J. (1994). Paleontología. Conceptos y métodos. Editorial Síntesis, S.A. Col. Ciencias de la vida, 19. 334 p. ISBN 84-7738-249-2
- López Martínez, N. (Coord.) (2009). Mesozoic terrestrial ecosystems in Eastern Spain. Fundación Conjunto Paleontológico de Teruel. Fundamental, 14: 156 p. ISBN 978-84-934800-8-0
- López Martínez, N. (2013). Geología y paleontología para aficionados : excursiones por el Pallars y el Alt Urgell. Editorial Entrecomes. 195 p. ISBN 978-84-941042-2-0 [ed. póstuma]

=== Blogs ===
- Teaching in Palaeontology of Vertebrates (http://paleovertebrata.blogspot.com. es/)
- Humans and Animals (http://humanos-y-animales.blogspot.com.es/)
- GeoPaleoBiological Research in Somosaguas (http://investigacionensomosaguas.blogspot.com.es/)
- Beyond Somosaguas (http://masalla-de-somosaguas.blogspot.com.es/) [Defunct]

== Research groups and development ==
López Martínez conducted over the years various research groups in collaboration with the Complutense University. They varied in their field as well as publication material, but she is widely acknowledged as a part of UCM faculty with some of the biggest impacts on the academic development of paleontological studies in the Spanish sphere. Below are some research projects and grants in which she took place:

- Ministry of Science and Innovation of the Spanish Government (BTE2002-1430): Paleoenvironmental and paleoclimatic changes across the Cretaceous-Tertiary boundary in the South Central Pyrenees. PI: Nieves López-Martínez. 2002–2005.
- Madrid Government, Research Group 910161: Geological record of critical periods: paleoclimatic and paleoenvironmental factors. PI: Nieves López-Martínez. 2005–2006.
- Ministry of Education of the Spanish Government (CCT006-06-00100): Experimental excavation and paleontological workshop in the Somosaguas site. PI: Nieves López-Martínez. 2006.
- Ministry of Science and Innovation of the Spanish Government (CGL2006-04646/BTE): Paleoclimatic and paleoenvironmental factors in critical periods of the Cretaceous-Tertiary boundary. PI: Nieves López-Martínez. 2006–2009.
- Madrid Government, Research Group 910161: Paleobiogeographical changes during critical periods. PI: Nieves López-Martínez. 2007.
- Ministry of Science and Innovation of the Spanish Government (FCT-08-0973): Conference cycle and paleontological workshop in the Somosaguas site: an educative view of mammal evolution. PI: Nieves López-Martínez. 2008.

== Somosaguas paleontological project ==
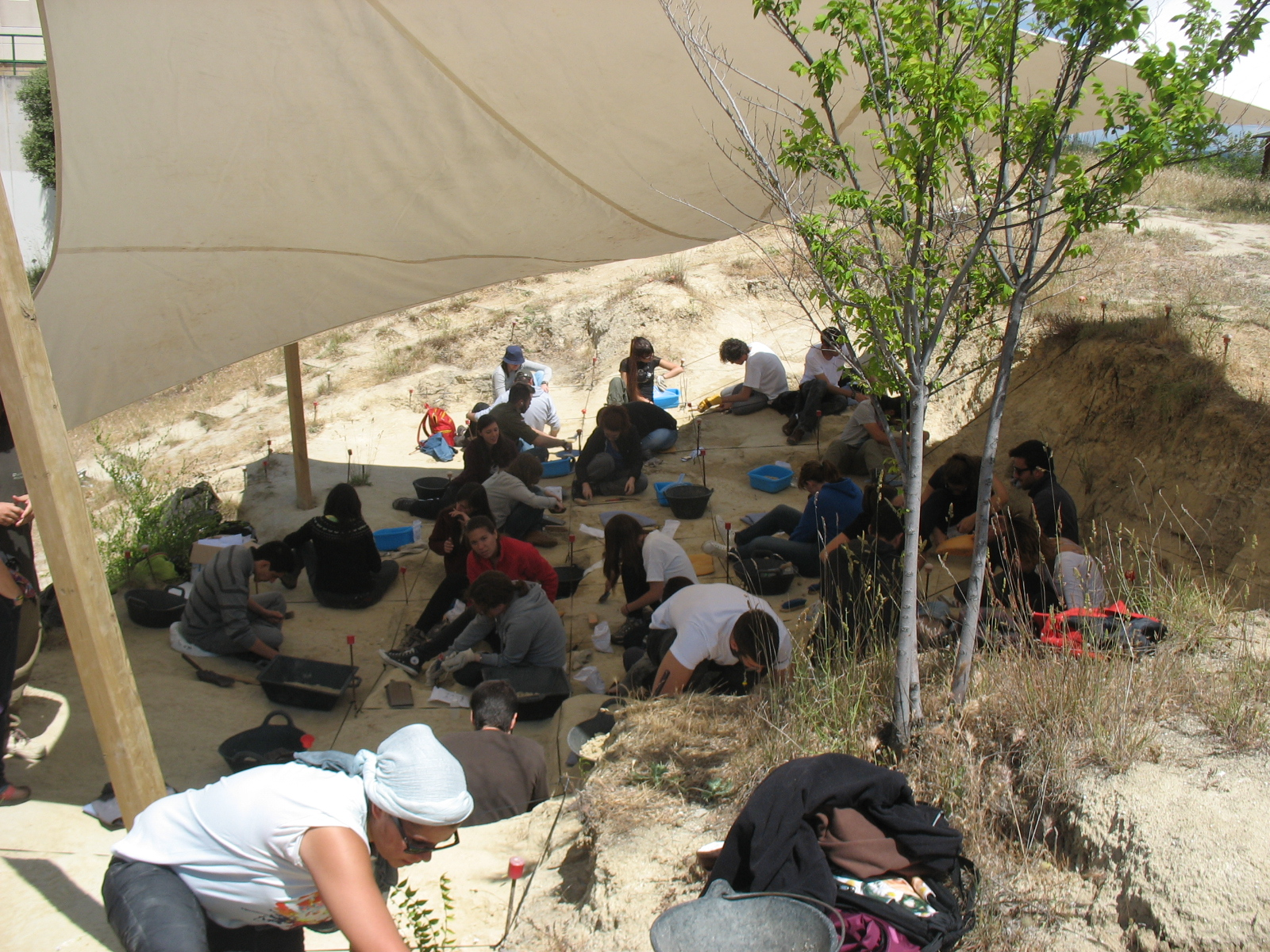
Somosaguas fossil site - 2014 paleontological campaign

The Somosaguas paleontological project, which was a result of the excavation and analysis of the Somosaguas paleontological site, was coordinated by Nieves López from 1998 to 2010. It is especially recognized in the way that students led most of the research and management of the project, working alongside faculty.

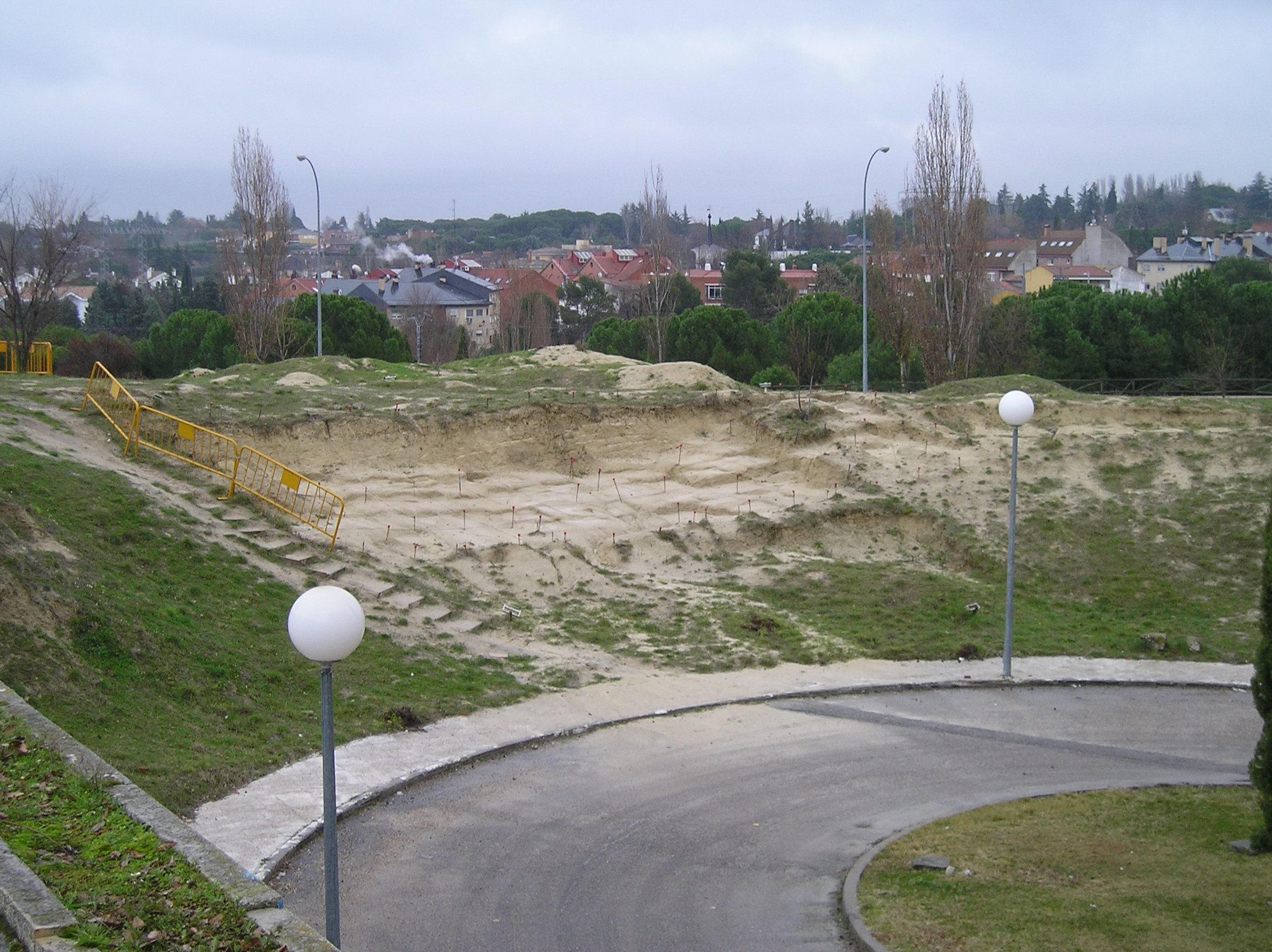
North Somosaguas, Pozuelo de Alarcón, Madrid, Spain.

The site hosted several field seasons, in which excavations were led for the discovery and collection of different fossils and sometimes also sediments for study. These were usually conducted during the spring, time during which students cleared and analyzed further sections of the project.

In 2007, the project also began offering education on Geology, Paleontology, and excavations techniques as pertinent to the exploration of the paleontological site. Over the years this also included not only training for researchers interested in working on the excavations, fossil cleanup, and classification, but it was eventually opened to other interested students, and eventually groups of high-school students and the public had special days in which they were allowed to visit and learn about the project. This was cataloged by the developers of the program as "social paleontology", which had a focus on expanding the interest and general education on the field.

Research conducted as part of the project led to multiple publications in paleontology, with the year 2000 being especially prolific with 10 papers accepted by the journal Colloquios de Paleontologia. Over the following years, the taxodermic discoveries of the project were mostly analyzed and understood as the publications slowed, yet more than 30 papers were published to date and sampling is continued to be held.

Overall, the Somosaguas Paleontological Project has worked over the years as a successful hands-on educational platform in Spain, and over the years also served as a research incubator for paleontological research given the richness in fossil samples it has presented.
