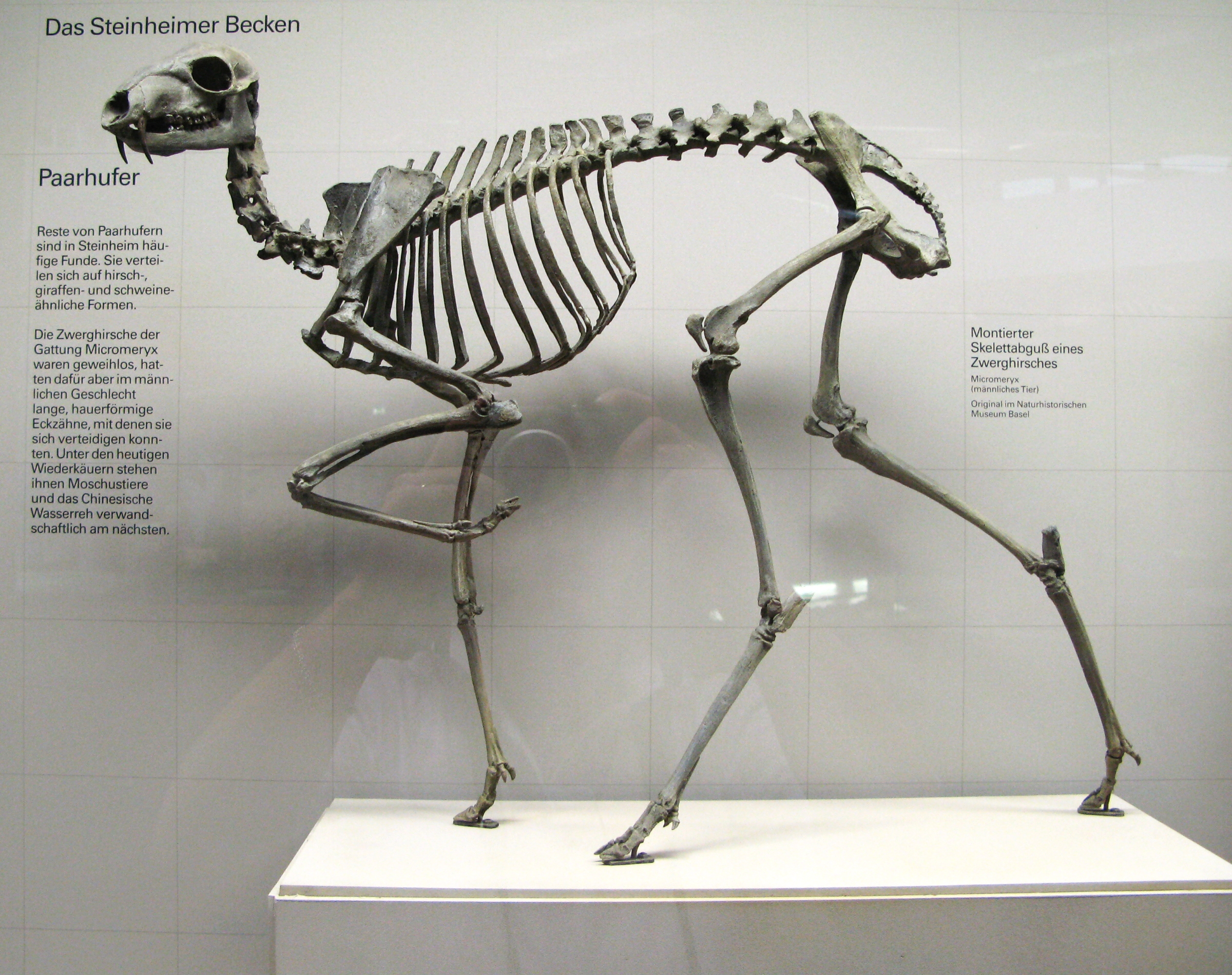
- Skeleton of Micromeryx, a typical moschid from the Miocene epoch
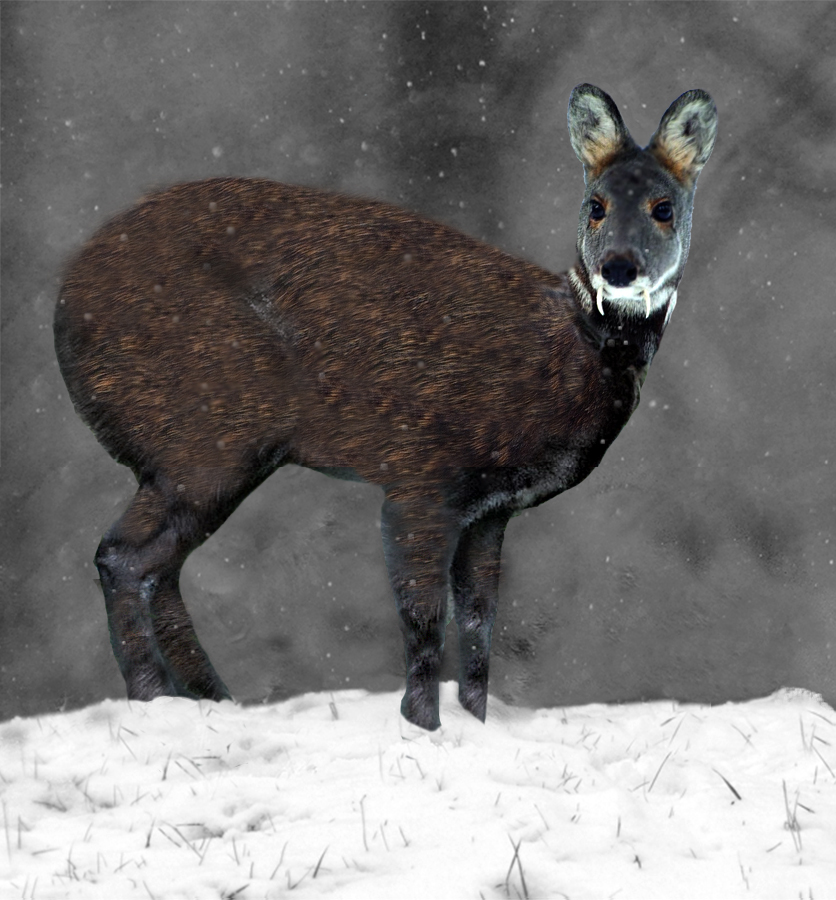
- Moschus moschiferus, the extant Siberian musk deer

Scientific classification
- Kingdom: Animalia
- Phylum: Chordata
- Class: Mammalia
- Order: Artiodactyla
- Superfamily: Bovoidea
- Family: Moschidae; J. E. Gray, 1821

Type genus
- Moschus Linnaeus, 1758

Genera
- See text
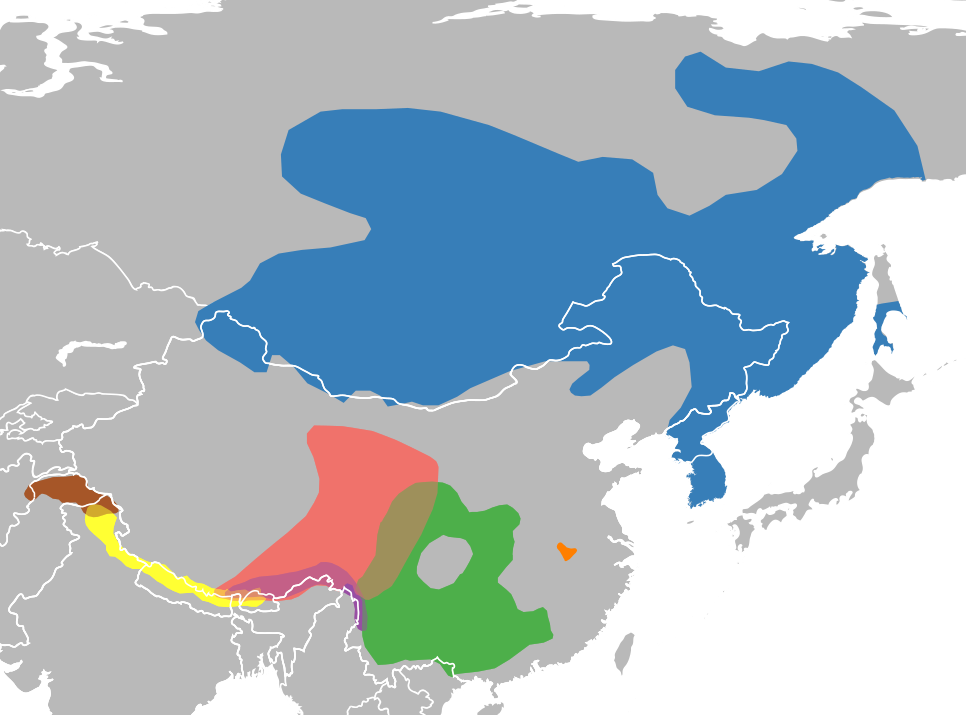
- Moschidae distribution. Moschus anhuiensis in orange, M. berezovskii in green, M. chrysogaster in red, M. cupreus in brown, M. fuscus in purple, M. leucogaster in yellow, and M. moschiferus in blue.

= Moschidae =

Moschidae Temporal range: Miocene–Holocene

Family of mammals belonging to even-toed ungulates

Moschidae is a family of pecoran even-toed ungulates, containing the musk deer (Moschus) and its extinct relatives. They are characterized by long "saber teeth" instead of horns, antlers or ossicones, modest size (Moschus only reaches 37 lb (17 kg); other taxa were even smaller) and a lack of facial glands. While various Oligocene and Miocene pecorans were previously assigned to this family, recent studies find that most should be assigned to their own clades, although further research would need to confirm these traits. As a result, Micromeryx, Hispanomeryx, and Moschus are the only undisputed moschid members, making them known from at least 18 Ma. The group was abundant across Eurasia and North America during the Miocene, but afterwards declined to only the extant genus Moschus by the early Pleistocene.

== Taxonomy and classification ==
Until the early 21st century, it was believed that the musk deer (family Moschidae) were an adjacent, sister-group to the "true deer" of the family Cervidae (caribou, moose, elk, and roughly 40–50 other species); however, a 2003 phylogenetic study by Alexandre Hassanin (of the National Museum of Natural History, France) and co., based on mitochondrial and nuclear analyses, revealed that Moschidae and Bovidae (antelope, cattle, goats, sheep), together, form a sister-clade to Cervidae. According to the study, the Cervidae diverged from the Bovidae-Moschidae clade roughly 27–28 million years ago. The following cladogram is based on this 2003 study:

- Ruminantia
  - Tragulina
    Tragulidae
  - Pecora
    - Antilocapridae
    - Giraffidae
    - - Cervidae
      - - Bovidae
        - Moschidae

After Prothero (2007)

Family Moschidae

- Micromeryx†
  - Micromeryx styriacus
  - Micromeryx flourensianus
  - Micromeryx? eiselei – this species is a proposed member of genus Micromeryx
- Moschus
  - Moschus moschiferus
  - Moschus anhuiensis
  - Moschus berezovskii
  - Moschus fuscus
  - Moschus chrysogaster
  - Moschus cupreus
  - Moschus leucogaster
- Hispanomeryx†
  - Hispanomeryx aragonensis
  - Hispanomeryx daamsi
  - Hispanomeryx duriensis
  - Hispanomeryx andrewsi
- Hydropotopsis (?)†
  - Hydropotopsis lemanensis
- Oriomeryx (?)†
  - Oriomeryx major
  - Oriomeryx willii
- Friburgomeryx (?)†
  - Friburgomeryx wallenriedensis
- Bedenomeryx (?)†
  - Bedenomeryx truyolsi
  - Bedenomeryx milloquensis
  - Bedenomeryx paulhiacensis
- Subfamily Blastomerycinae (?)†
  - Pseudoblastomeryx
    - Pseudoblastomeryx advena
  - Machaeromeryx
    - Machaeromeryx tragulus
  - Longirostromeryx†
    - Longirostromeryx clarendonensis
    - Longirostromeryx wellsi
  - Problastomeryx
    - Problastomeryx primus
  - Parablastomeryx
    - Parablastomeryx floridanus
    - Parablastomeryx gregorii
  - Blastomeryx†
    - Blastomeryx gemmifer

Phylogeny of Moschidae, according to Sanchez et. al (2010):

- - - Cervidae
    - - - Blastomeryx
        - Dremotherium
      - - - - Micromeryx
            - Moschus
          - Hispanomeryx
        - Bovidae

== Characteristics ==
Extant musk deer are similar to cervids in appearance. They can be distinguished from cervids by their lack of antlers and the presence of a large canine tooth, a musk gland, a single lacrimal orifice, and a gall bladder (which cervids lack).
