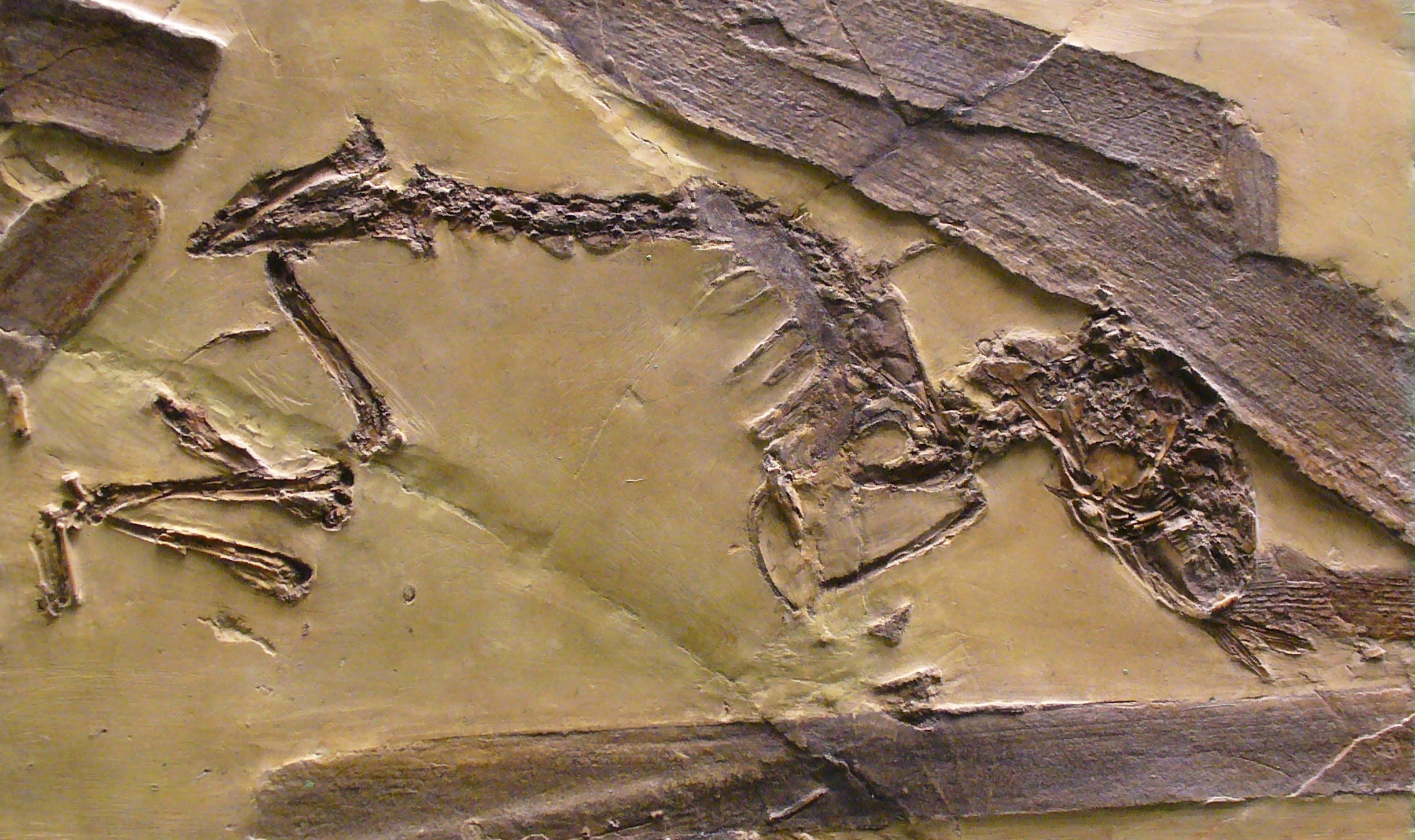
- Prolagus oeningensis fossil

Scientific classification
- Kingdom: Animalia
- Phylum: Chordata
- Class: Mammalia
- Order: Lagomorpha
- Family: †Prolagidae
- Genus: †Prolagus
- Species: †P. oeningensis

Binomial name
- †Prolagus oeningensis König, 1825
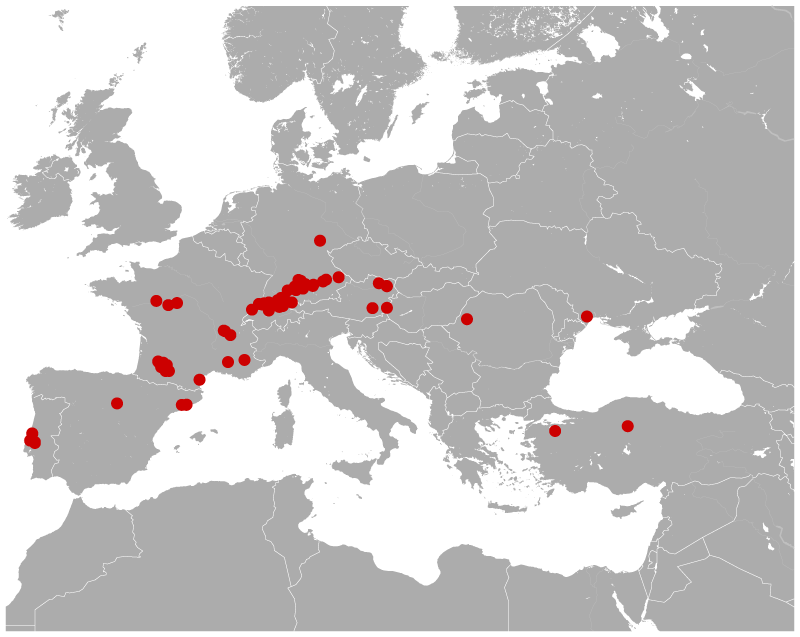
- Prolagus oeningensis fossils distribution map. (Note: The coordinates of additional fossils not listed in the xls file attached to Ge and all paper were taken from the Paleobiology Database. (Note: Antunes, M. T.; Mein, P. (1981). "Vertébrés du miocène moyen de amor (Leiria) - importance stratigraphique". Ciências da Terra (in French). 6: 169–188. [J. Mueller/T. Liebrecht/T. Liebrecht] Paleobiology Database: Amor, point 1 ("premiere gisement" of Zbyszewski)", Amor, points 2 to 5 (Miocene of Portugal)) (Note: Buffetaut, E.; Crouzel, F.; Juillard, F.; Stigliani, F. (1984). "Le crocodilien longirostre Gavialosuchus dans le Miocene moyen de Polastron (Gers, France)". Geobios (in French). 17 (1): 113–117. Bibcode:1984Geobi..17..113B. doi:10.1016/S0016-6995(84)80009-1. [P. Mannion/P. Mannion] Paleobiology Database: Polastron (Miocene of France)) (Note: Heissig, K. (1989). "Neue Ergebnisse zur Stratigraphie der mittleren Serie der Oberen Süßwassermolasse Bayerns (New results on the stratigraphy of the middle series of upper Freshwater Molasse, Bavaria)". Geologica Bavarica (in German). 94: 239–257. [J. Alroy/S. Kuemmell/S. Kuemmell] Paleobiology Database: Ziemetshausen 1b, 1a (Miocene of Germany)) (Note: Ginsburg, L.; Bonneau, M. (1995). "La succession des faunes de mammiferes miocenes de Pontigne (Maine-et-Loire, France)". Bulletin du Muséum National d'Histoire Naturelle (in French). 4 (2–4): 313–328. [M. Uhen/M. Uhen]Paleobiology Database: Pontigne 4 (marine) (Miocene of France) (les Buissoneaux)) (Note: Böttcher, R.; Heizmann, E. P. J.; Rasser, M. W; Ziegler, R. (2009). "Biostratigraphy and palaeoecology of a Middle Miocene (Karpathian, MN 5) fauna from the northern margin of the North Alpine Foreland Basin (Oggenhausen 2, SW' Germany)". Neues Jahrbuch für Geologie und Paläontologie, Abhandlungen. 254 (1/2): 237–260. doi:10.1127/0077-7749/2009/0011. [J. Mueller/T. Liebrecht] Paleobiology Database: Oggenhausen 2 (Miocene of Germany)) (Note: Additional contributors to utilized records of Paleobiology Database (authorizers supplying these records) include Johannes Mueller, Philip Mannion, John Alroy, Mark Uhen.))

Synonyms
- Prolagus aeningensis (König, 1825); Lagomys (Cuvier, 1800); Anoema (König, 1825); Archaeomys (Fraas, 1856); Myolagus (Hensel, 1856)

= Prolagus oeningensis =

Prolagus oeningensis Temporal range: 15.97–7.75 Ma Langhian - late Tortonian

Extinct species of mammal

Prolagus oeningensis is an extinct lagomorph and the type species of its genus, Prolagus. It lived from 15.97 to 7.75 Ma, existing for about 8 million years.

== Range ==
The species has been found in various locations in Europe and Asia. It was named after the town of Öhningen in Germany, its type locality.

== Diet ==
This species was possibly a herbivore like other living lagomorphs.
