= Hispanomeryx =

Hispanomeryx Temporal range: Middle Miocene–Late Miocene

Scientific classification
- Kingdom: Animalia
- Phylum: Chordata
- Class: Mammalia
- Order: Artiodactyla
- Family: Moschidae
- Genus: †Hispanomeryx; Morales, Moyà-Solà, and Soria, 1981

Species
- See text

Extinct genus of deer

Hispanomeryx is an extinct genus of artiodactyl from the middle to late Miocene epoch, living from 13 to 8 million years ago. Over the years, they have been variously classified as being related to bovids or giraffes, or even belonging to their own unique family, but they are now widely regarded as moschids, relatives of the living musk deer.

Hispanomeryx would have resembled modern musk deer, but was smaller, and some of the teeth in the lower jaw resembled those of bovids, possibly as an adaptation to its diet. Most fossils are known from Spain, but others are known from Turkey to China, most of which are too fragmentary to be assigned to a particular species. Hispanomeryx seems to have been an adaptable species, and to have lived in both subtropical forests and open, relatively arid, savanna.

The following species are known:

- H. andrewsi Sánchez et al., 2011 - China
- H. aragonensis Azanza, 1986 - Spain
- H. daamsi Sánchez, Domingo, and Morales, 2010 - Spain
- H. duriensis (type) Morales, Moyà-Solà, and Soria, 1981 - Spain
- H. lacetanus Sánchez et al., 2019 - Spain
- H. linxiaensis Aiglstorfer et al., 2023 - China
