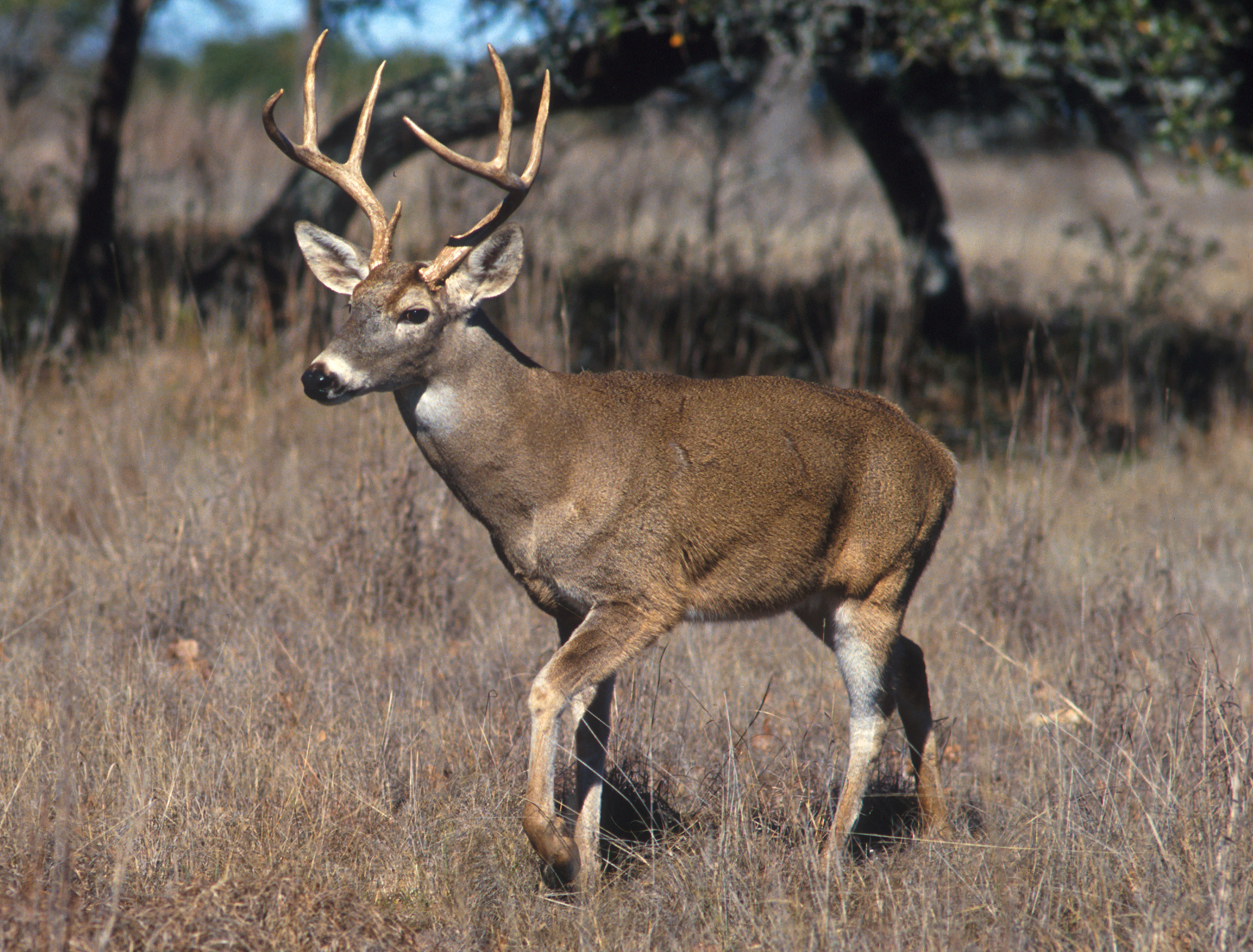
- Odocoileus virginianus

Scientific classification
- Kingdom: Animalia
- Phylum: Chordata
- Class: Mammalia
- Order: Artiodactyla
- Family: Cervidae
- Subfamily: Capreolinae
- Tribe: Odocoileini; Pocock, 1923

Type genus
- Odocoileus Rafinesque, 1832

Genera
- Rangifer; Blastocerus; Odocoileus; Mazama; Passalites; Andinocervus; Subulo; Ozotoceros; Pudu; Pudella; Hippocamelus; †Agalmaceros; †Torontoceros; †Antifer; †Bretzia; †Morenelaphus; †Eocoileus

= Odocoileini =

Tribe of deer

Odocoileini, the true New World deers, is a tribe of deer, containing seven extant genera and several extinct ones.

The common character of this tribe is vomerine septum that completely separates the choana.

== Phylogeny ==
Phylogeny by Gilbert et al. 2006 and Duarte et al. 2008, that showed Mazama is polyphyletic.

- - Odocoileini
    - Rangifer tarandus
    - - Pudu puda
      - - Mazama americana 1
        - Odocoileus
        - - Mazama americana 2 (paraphyletic)
          - - Mazama bororo
            - Mazama nana
      - - Mazama nemorivaga
        - - - Ozotoceros
            - Hippocamelus antisensis
          - - Blastocerus dichotomus
            - - Hippocamelus bisulcus
              - Mazama gouazoubira
  - Alceini
  - Capreolini
