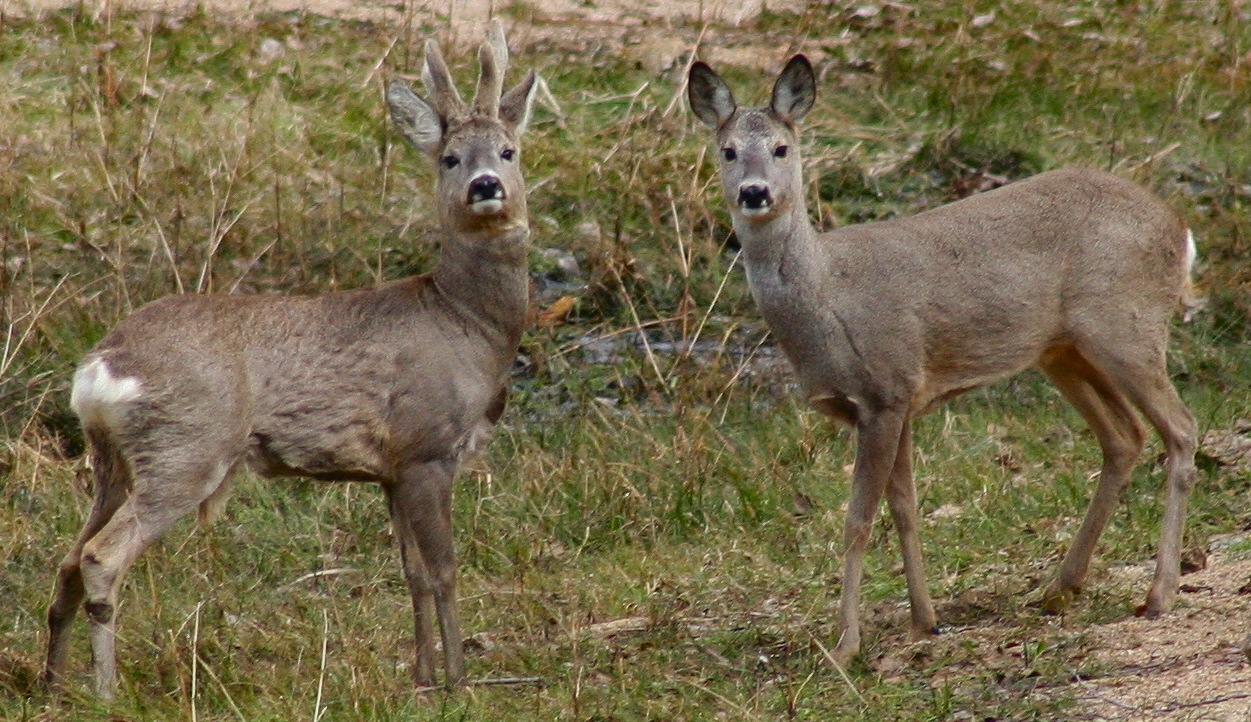
- A male and a female European roe deer

Scientific classification
- Kingdom: Animalia
- Phylum: Chordata
- Class: Mammalia
- Infraclass: Placentalia
- Order: Artiodactyla
- Family: Cervidae
- Subfamily: Capreolinae
- Tribe: Capreolini
- Genus: Capreolus; Gray, 1821

Type species
- Cervus capreolus Linnaeus, 1758

Species
- Capreolus capreolus; Capreolus pygargus
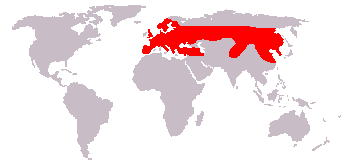
- Range of genus Capreolus

= Capreolus =

Capreolus Temporal range: Pliocene–present

Genus of deer

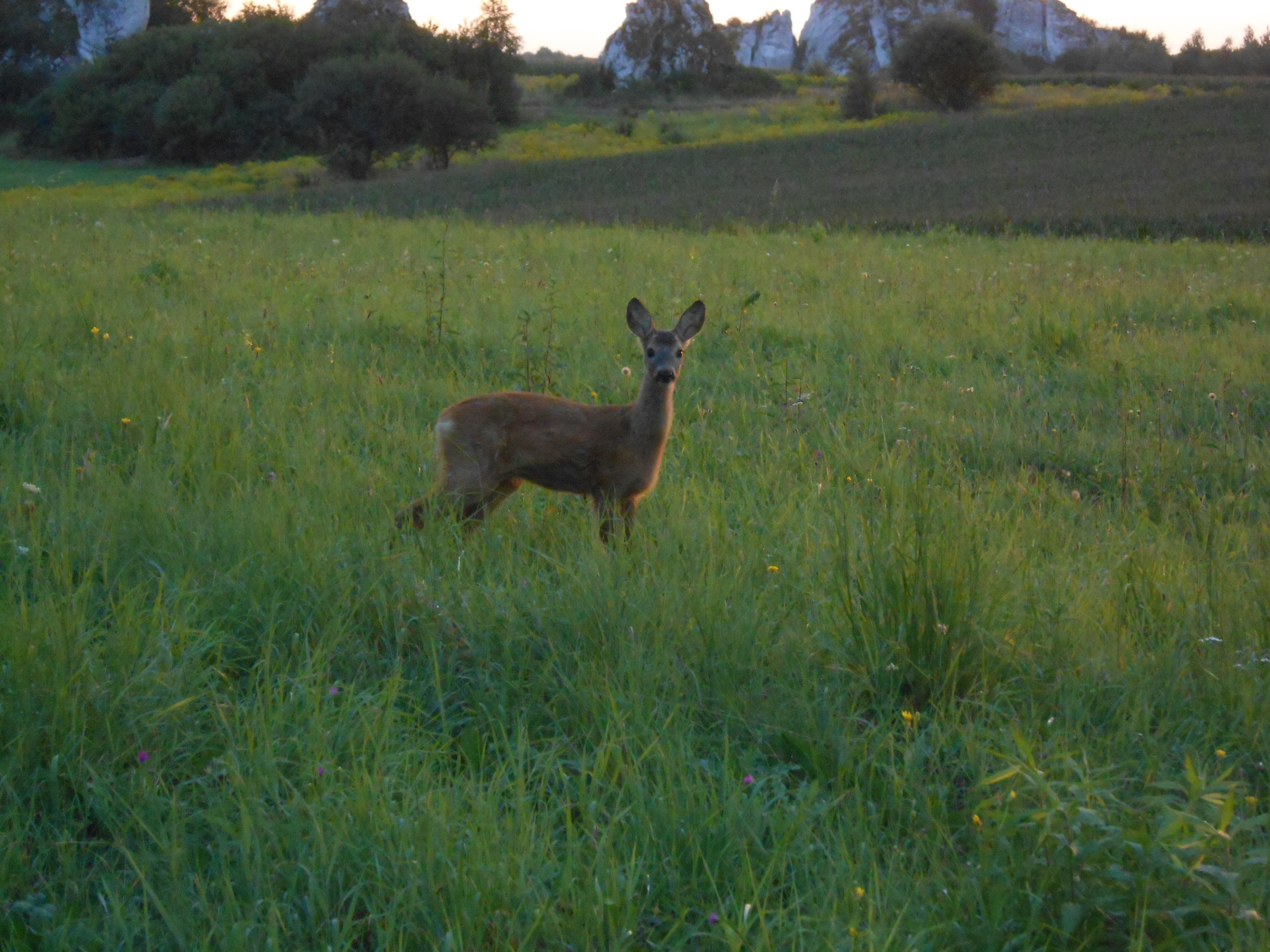
Young roe deer

Capreolus is a genus of deer, the roe deer. It contains two species native to Eurasia, and fossil evidence also supports their former presence in North America.

== Etymology ==
English roe is from Old English ra or rá, from raha, from Proto-Germanic *raikhaz, cognate to Old Norse ra, Old Saxon reho, Middle Dutch and Dutch ree, Old High German reh, German Reh. It is perhaps ultimately derived from a PIE root *rei-, meaning "streaked, spotted or striped".

The word is attested on the 5th-century Caistor-by-Norwich astragalus -a roe deer talus bone, written in Elder Futhark as ᚱᚨᛇᚺᚨᚾ, transliterated as raïhan.

In the English language this animal was originally simply called a 'roe', but over time the word 'roe' has become a qualifier and the creature is now usually called a 'roe deer'.

The Koiné Greek name πύγαργος, transliterated 'pygargos', mentioned in the Septuagint and the works of various writers such as Hesychius, Herodotus and later Pliny, was originally thought to refer to this species (in many European translations of the Bible), although it is now more often believed to refer to the addax. It is derived from the words pyge 'buttocks' and argo 'white'.

The taxonomic name Capreolus is derived from capra or caprea, meaning 'billy goat', with the diminutive suffix -olus. The meaning of this word in Latin is not entirely clear: it may have meant 'ibex' or 'chamois'. The roe deer was also known as capraginus or capruginus in Latin.

== Systematics ==
Roe deer are most closely related to the water deer Hydropotes, and, counterintuitively, the three species in this group, called the Capreolini, are most closely related to elk and moose Alces.

Although roe deer were once classified as belonging to the subfamily Cervinae, they are now classified as part of the Capreolinae, which includes the deer from the New World.

== Palaeontology ==
Roe deer are thought to have evolved from a species in the Eurasian genus Procapreolus, with some 10 species occurring from the Late Miocene to the Early Pleistocene, which moved from the east to Central Europe over the millennia, where Procapreolus cusanus occurred, also classified as Capreolus cusanus. It may not have evolved from C. cusanus, however, because the two extant species split from each other 1.375 and 2.75 Myr ago, and the western species first appeared in Europe 600 thousand years ago.

The Siberian roe deer had split into two subspecies, C. pygargus pygargus and C. pygargus tianschanicus in the interval between 229 and 462.3 thousand years ago.

The distribution of the European species has fluctuated often since entering Europe. During some periods during the Last Glacial Period it was present in central Europe, but during the Last Glacial Maximum it retreated to refugia in the Iberian Peninsula (two refugia here), Southern France, Italy (likely two), the Balkans and the Carpathians. When the last ice age ended, the species initially abruptly expanded north of the Alps to Germany during the Greenland Interstadial, 12.5–10.8 thousand years ago. During the cooling of the Younger Dryas, 10.8–10 thousand years ago, the species appears to have disappeared again from this region. It reappeared 9.7–9.5 thousand years ago, reaching northern central Europe. The modern population in this area appears to have recolonised it from the Carpathians and/or further east, but not the Balkans or other refugia. This is opposite to the red deer, which recolonised Europe from Iberia. There has been much admixture of these populations where they meet, also possibly due to human intervention in some cases. It had become a very common species by the Late Neolithic, as farming by humans spread across the continent, which modified the environment so that more open habitat was created from the woodland, which advantaged the creatures.

It was previously assumed that Capreolus only ever inhabited Eurasia, the likely ancestral home for the Capreolinae. However, a 2014 paleontological study recovered fossil remains of the species Capreolus constantini, previously known only from Russia, from the Pliocene of Hidalgo, Mexico. This suggests the existence of a previously unknown dispersal event of Capreolus from Eurasia to North America across Beringia during the Pliocene, where the genus is no longer found in the present day.

== Species ==
There are at least two extant species:

Genus Capreolus – Gray, 1821 – two species
Common name	Scientific name and subspecies	Range	Size and ecology	IUCN status and estimated population
European roe deer Male Female	Capreolus capreolus (Linnaeus, 1758) Four subspecies: Capreolus capreolus capreolus (Linnaeus, 1758); Capreolus capreolus canus Miller, 1910; Capreolus capreolus caucasicus Nikolay Yakovlevich Dinnik, 1910; Capreolus capreolus italicus Enrico Festa, 1925	Scotland south to the Mediterranean and east to Iran and the Caucasus.	Size: Habitat: Diet:	LC
Siberian roe deer Male Female	Capreolus pygargus (Pallas, 1771) Two subspecies: C. p. pygargus; C. p. tianschanicus	Urals south to the Caucasus and east to Manchuria.	Size: Habitat: Diet:	LC

The fossil species †Capreolus constantini Vislobokova, Dmitrieva, & Kalmykov, 1995 from the Pliocene is the oldest known species, and appears to have had a Holarctic distribution, being known from both Siberia and central Mexico.

Both species have seen their populations increase, both around the 1930s. In recent times, since the 1960s, the two species have become sympatric where their distributions meet, and there is now a broad 'hybridization zone' running from the right hand side of the Volga River up to eastern Poland. It is extremely difficult for hunters to know which species they have bagged. In line with Haldane's rule, female hybrids of the two taxa are fertile while male hybrids are not. Hybrids are much larger than normal and a cesarean section was sometimes needed to birth the fawns, becoming larger than their mothers at the age of 4–5 months. F1 hybrid males may be sterile, but backcrosses with the females is possible.

22% of the animals around Moscow carry the mtDNA of the European roe deer and 78% of the Siberian. In the Volgograd region the European deer predominates. In Stavropol and the Dnipropetrovsk region of Ukraine most of the roe are Siberian. In northeastern Poland there is also evidence of introgression with the Siberian deer, which was likely introduced. In some cases, such as around Moscow, former introductions of European stock is likely responsible. It is thought that during the Middle Ages the two species were kept apart due to hunting pressure and an abundance of predators, the different populations may have met in the period before that, but during the Ice Age they were also kept apart.
