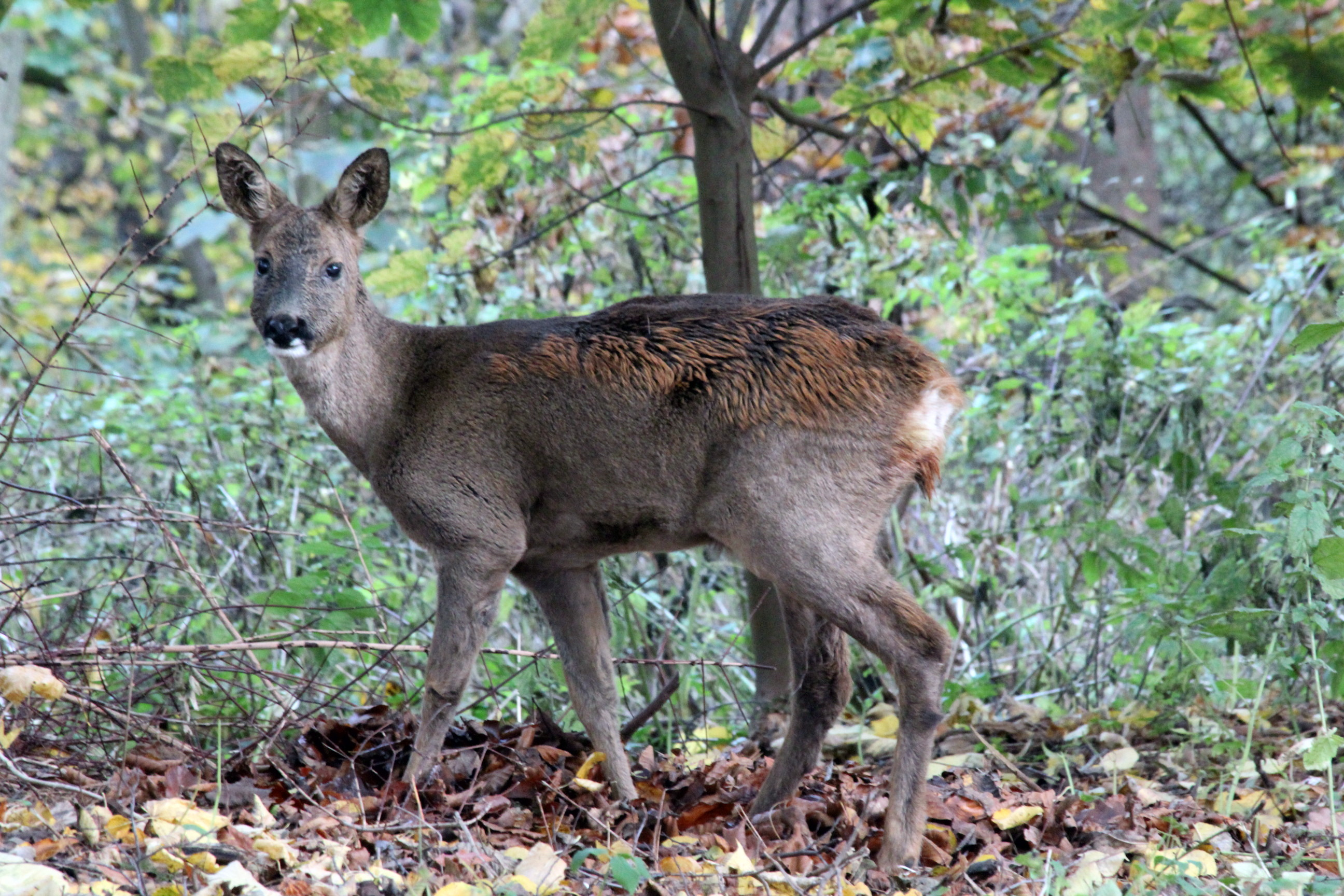
- Roe deer (Capreolus capreolus) in Göteborg, Sweden

Scientific classification
- Kingdom: Animalia
- Phylum: Chordata
- Class: Mammalia
- Order: Artiodactyla
- Family: Cervidae
- Subfamily: Capreolinae; Brookes, 1828

Subgroups
- Alceini; Capreolini; Odocoileini

Synonyms
- Odocoileinae

= Capreolinae =

Capreolinae Temporal range: Middle Miocene to present

Subfamily of mammals

The Capreolinae (synonym Odocoileinae Pocock, 1923) are a subfamily of deer. The scientific name derives from its type genus, Capreolus. Alternatively, they are known as the telemetacarpal deer, due to their bone structure being different from the plesiometacarpal deer subfamily Cervinae. The telemetacarpal deer maintain their distal lateral metacarpals, while the plesiometacarpal deer maintain only their proximal lateral metacarpals. The Capreolinae are believed to have originated in the Middle Miocene, between 7.7 and 11.5 million years ago, in Central Asia.

The subfamily is sometimes called New World deer in English, though it includes reindeer, elk, water deer and roe deer, all of which live in Eurasia in the Old World.

== Classification ==
The following extant genera and species are accepted:

- Tribe Capreolini
  - Genus Capreolus
    - Roe deer (C. capreolus)
    - Siberian roe deer (C. pygargus)
  - Genus Hydropotes
    - Water deer (H. inermis)
- Tribe Alceini
  - Genus Alces
    - Moose or (Eurasian) elk (A. alces)
- Tribe Odocoileini
  - Genus Rangifer
    - Caribou/reindeer (R. tarandus)
  - Genus Odocoileus
    - Mule deer (O. hemionus)
    - White-tailed deer (O. virginianus)
    - Yucatan brown brocket (O. pandora)
  - Genus Blastocerus
    - Marsh deer (B. dichotomus)
  - Genus Hippocamelus
    - Taruca (H. antisensis)
    - South Andean deer or huemul (H. bisulcus)
  - Genus Mazama
    - Central American red brocket (M. temama)
    - Red brocket (M. americana) (This species has been found to be closer to Odocoileus than other brockets.)
  - Genus Andinocervus
    - Small red brocket or bororo (A. bororo)
    - Pygmy brocket (A. nanus)
    - Merida brocket (A. bricenii)
    - Little red brocket (A. rufinus)
  - Genus Ozotoceros
    - Pampas deer (O. bezoarticus)
  - Genus Passalites
    - Amazonian brown brocket (P. nemorivagus)
  - Genus Pudu
    - Southern pudu (P. pudu)
  - Genus Pudella
    - Peruvian Yungas pudu (P. carlae)
    - Northern pudu (P. mephistophiles)
  - Genus Subulo
    - Gray brocket (S. gouazoubira)
    - Dwarf brocket (S. chunyi)

=== Extinct genera and species ===
- †Agalmaceros
- †Alces gallicus
- †Antifer
- †Bretzia
- †Cervalces
  - †C. carnutorum
  - †C. scotti
  - †C. latifrons
- †Eocoileus
- †Libralces
- †Morenelaphus
- †Odocoileus lucasi
- †Pavlodaria
- †Procapreolus
- †Torontoceros
