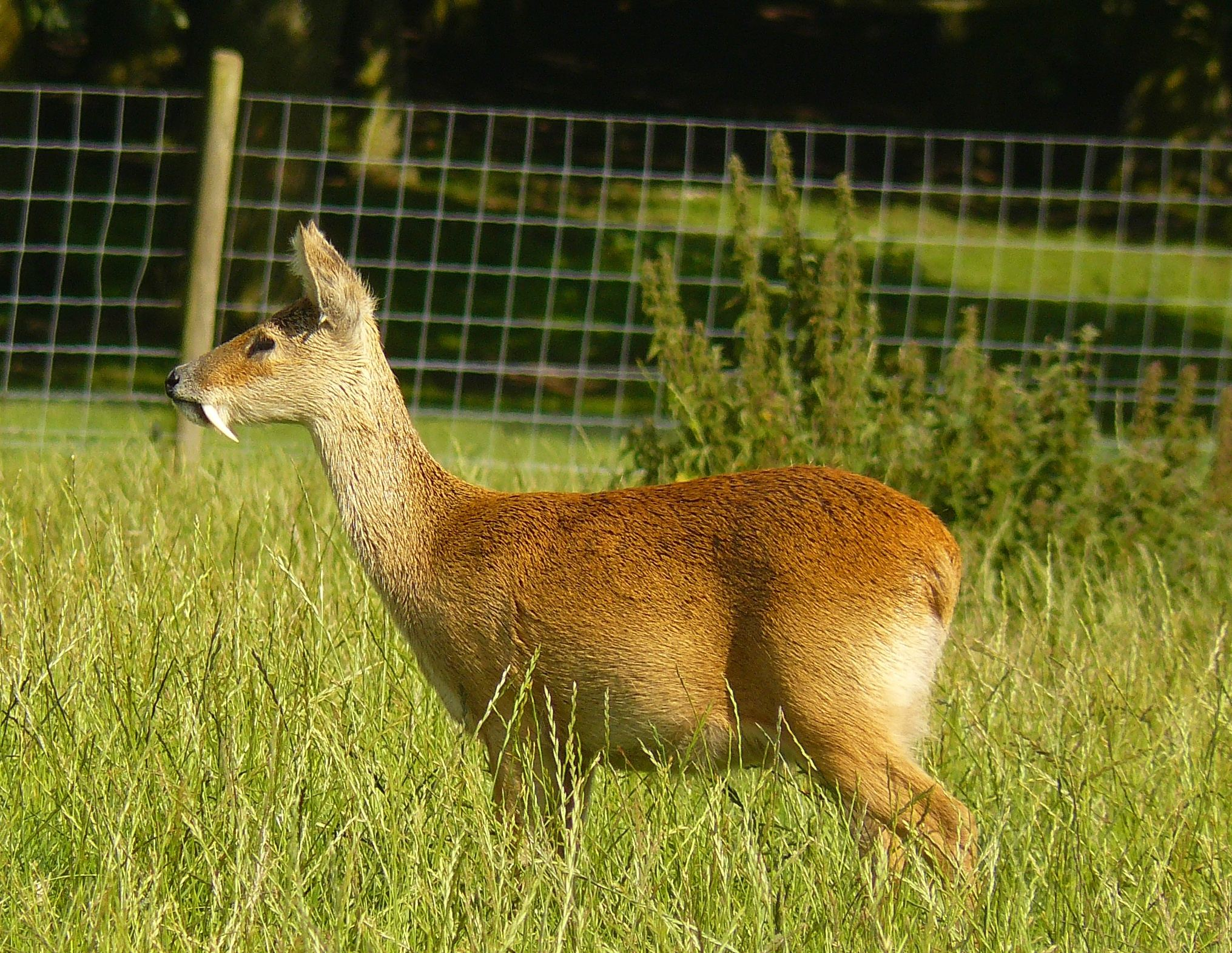
- Male water deer at the Whipsnade Zoo
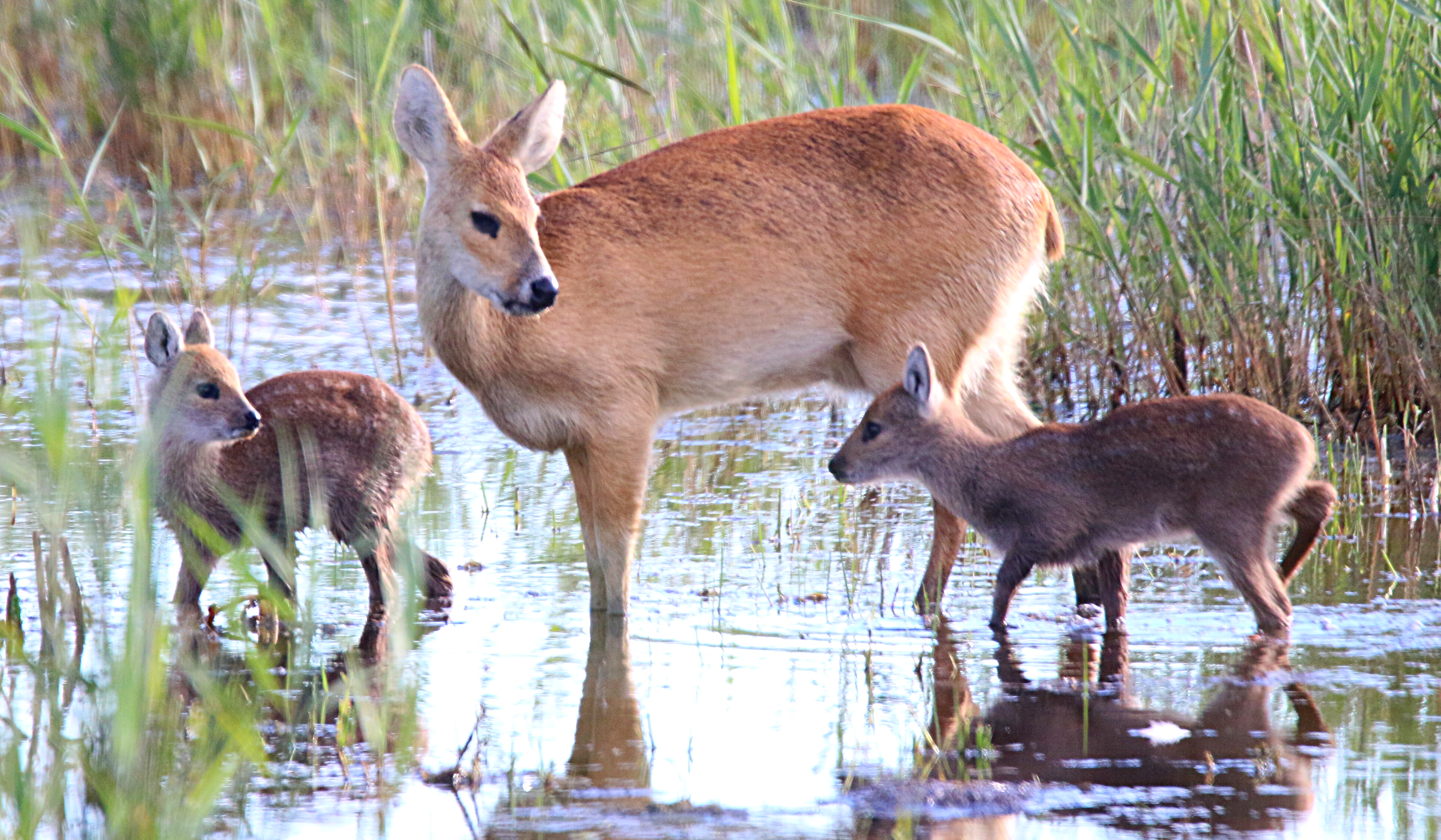
- Female and fawn at Hickling, Norfolk

Conservation status
- Vulnerable (IUCN 3.1)

Scientific classification
- Kingdom: Animalia
- Phylum: Chordata
- Class: Mammalia
- Order: Artiodactyla
- Family: Cervidae
- Subfamily: Capreolinae
- Tribe: Capreolini
- Genus: Hydropotes; R. Swinhoe, 1870
- Species: H. inermis

Binomial name
- Hydropotes inermis (R. Swinhoe, 1870)
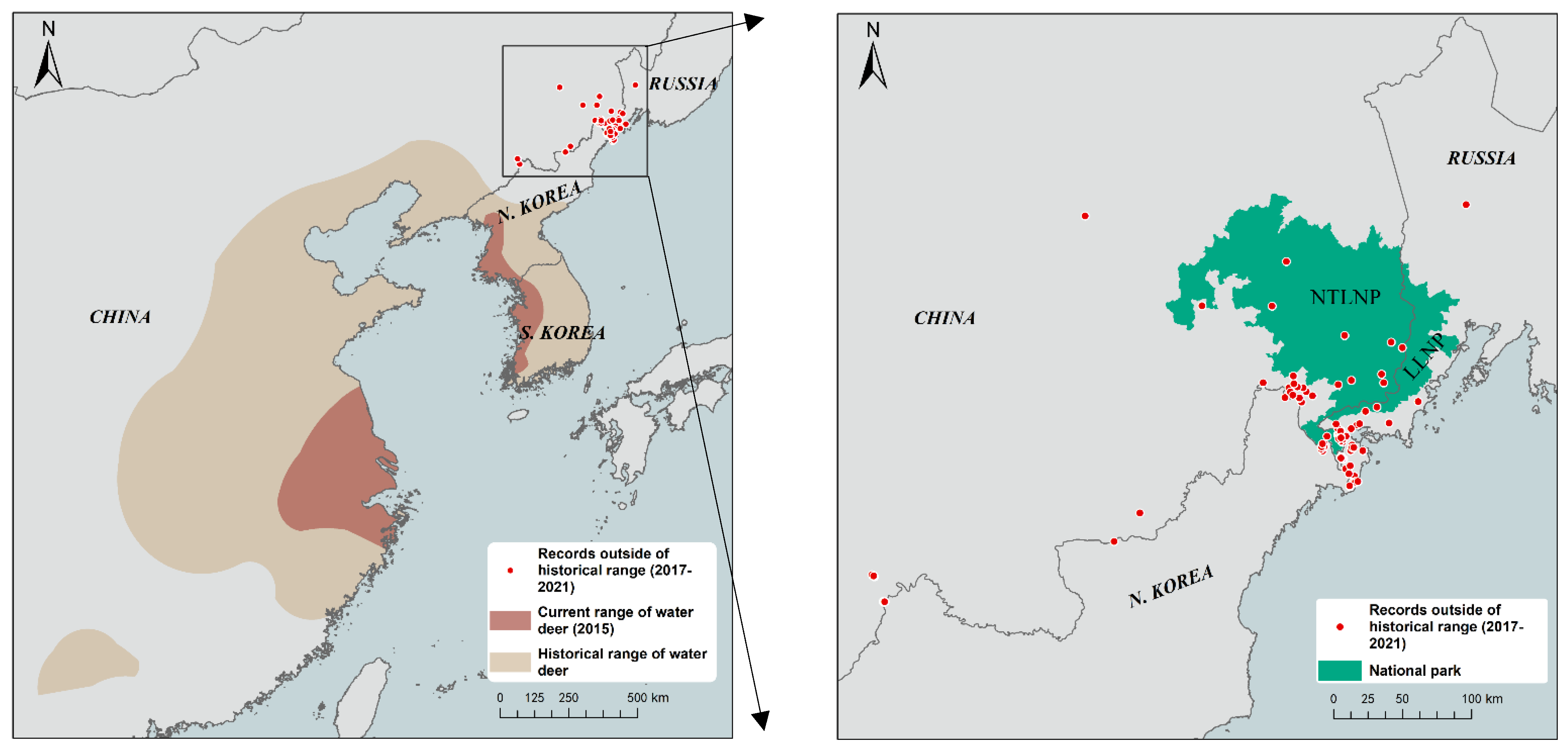
- Range of water deer

= Water deer =

Species of deer

The water deer (Hydropotes inermis) is a small deer species native to Korea and China. It has prominent tusks, unlike all other living true deer. It was first described to the Western world by Robert Swinhoe in 1870.

== Taxonomy ==
The two subspecies are the Chinese water deer (H. i. inermis) and the Korean water deer (H. i. argyropus). The water deer is superficially more similar to a musk deer than a true deer; despite anatomical peculiarities, including a pair of prominent tusks (downward-pointing canine teeth) and its lack of antlers, it is classified as a cervid, yet its unique anatomical characteristics have caused it to be classified in its own genus (Hydropotes), as well as historically its own subfamily (Hydropotinae). However, studies of mitochondrial control region and cytochrome b DNA sequences placed it near Capreolus within an Old World section of the subfamily Capreolinae, and all later molecular analyses show that Hydropotes is a sister taxon of Capreolus.

== Etymology ==
The genus name Hydropotes corresponds to the ancient Greek word ὑδροπότης, meaning "water-drinker", and presumably refers to the preference of this cervid for rivers and swamps.

The etymology of the species name corresponds to the Latin word inermis meaning unarmed, defenceless, itself constructed from the prefix in- meaning without, and the stem arma meaning defensive arms, armour, and presumably refers to the water deer's lack of antlers.

== Habitat and distribution ==
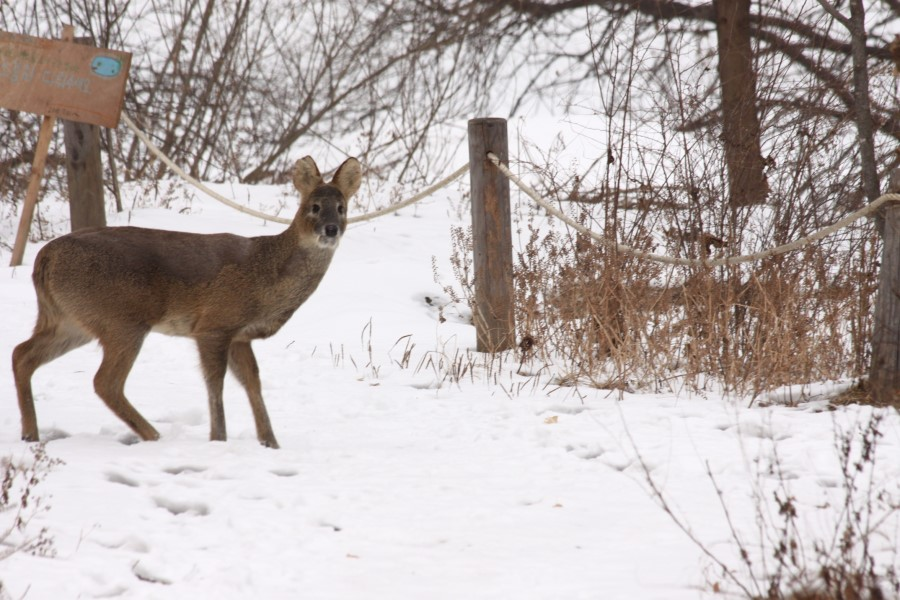
Korean water deer

Archeological studies indicate water deer were once distributed in a much broader range than currently during the Pleistocene and the Holocene periods; records have been obtained from eastern Tibet in the west, Inner Mongolia and northeastern China in the north, southeastern Korean Peninsula (Holocene) and Japanese archipelago (Pleistocene) in the east, southern China and northern Vietnam in the south. Water deer also inhabited Taiwan historically, however this population presumably became extinct as late as the early 19th century.

Water deer are indigenous to the lower reaches of the Yangtze River, coastal Jiangsu province (Yancheng Coastal Wetlands), and islands of Zhejiang of east-central China, and in Korea, where the demilitarized zone has provided a protected habitat for a large number. The Korean water deer (H. i. argyropus) is one of the two subspecies of water deer. While the population of Chinese subspecies is critically endangered in China, the Korean subspecies is known to number 700,000 throughout South Korea. In China, water deer are found in Zhoushan Islands in the Zhejiang (600–800), Jiangsu (500–1,000), Hubei, Henan, Anhui (500), Guangdong, Fujian, Poyang Lake in Jiangxi (1,000), Shanghai, and Guangxi. They are now extinct in southern and western China. Since 2006, water deer have been reintroduced in Shanghai, with a population increase from 21 individuals in 2007 to 227–299 individuals in 2013. In Korea, water deer are found nationwide and are known as gorani (고라니).

Water deer inhabit the land alongside rivers, where they are protected from sight by the tall reeds and rushes. They are also seen on mountains, swamps, grasslands, and even open cultivated fields. Water deer are proficient swimmers, and can swim several miles to reach remote river islands. An introduced population of Chinese water deer exists in the United Kingdom and another was extirpated from France.

=== South Korea ===
The species is listed as vulnerable by the International Union for Conservation of Nature, but in South Korea it is thriving because its natural predators, such as the Korean tiger and the Amur leopard, have been extirpated. Since 1994, Korean water deer have been designated as "harmful wildlife", a term given by the Ministry of Environment to wild creatures that can cause harm to humans or their property. Currently, certain local governments offer bounties from 30,000 to 50,000 won ($30 – 50) during the farming season. However, the hunting of water deer is not restricted to the warm season, as 18 hunting grounds were in operation in the winter of 2018.

	1971	1990	1999	2005	2010	2011	2012	2013	2014	2015	2016	2017
Density per 100 ha (1 km^{2}) of individuals	0.4	3.7	5.3	6.2	6.6	7.3	7.5	6.9	8.2	7.8	8.0	8.3
Deer kill (bounty hunting)					11,269		29,756	50,333	58,786	88,041	113,763	
Deer kill (hunting)						1,500	13,904	3,943	10,944	14,982		
Deer kill (car accidents)											60,000	

=== Britain ===
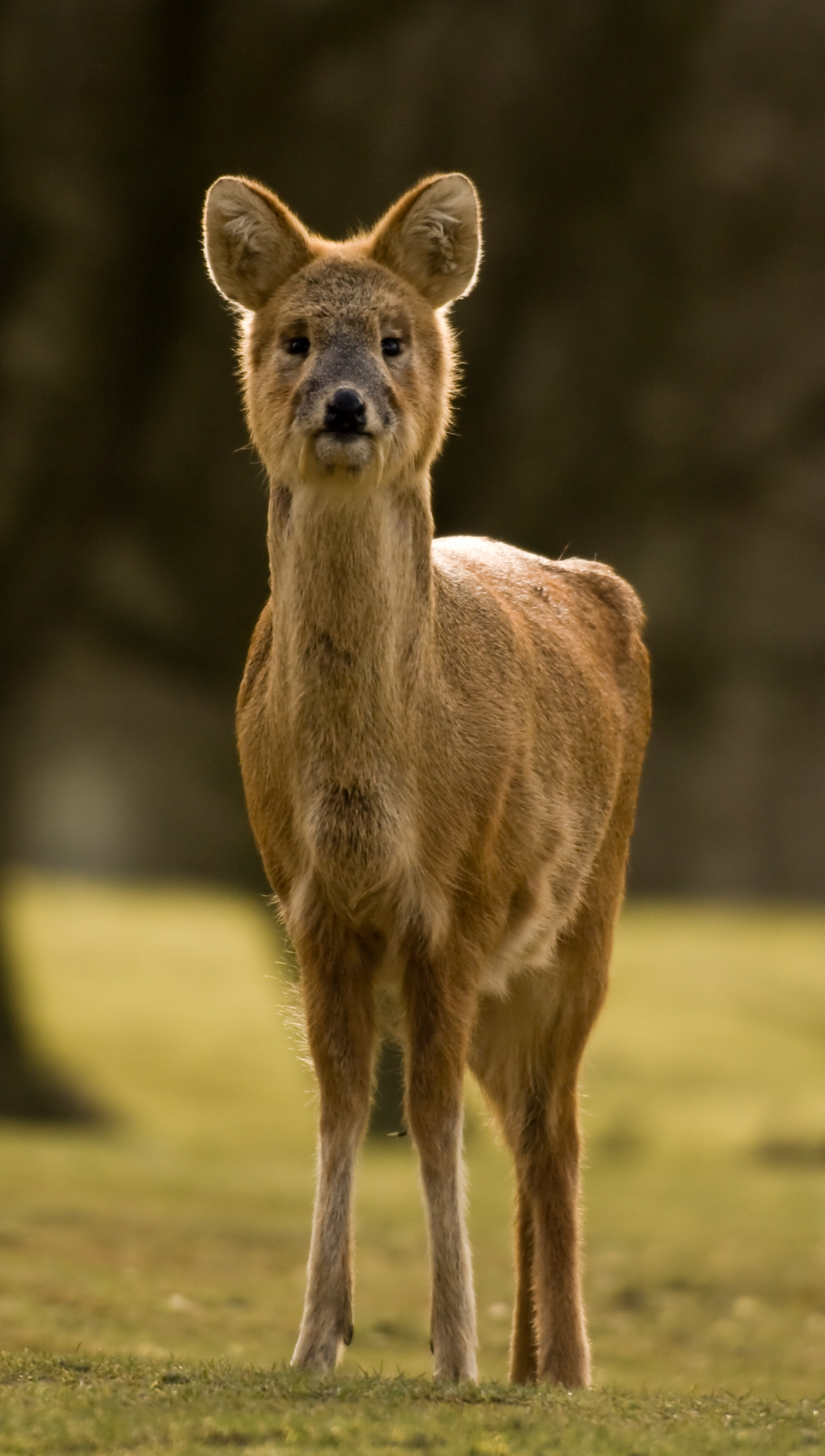
Chinese water deer (Hydropotes inermis inermis) at the Whipsnade Zoo

Chinese water deer were first introduced into Great Britain in the 1870s. The animals were kept in the London Zoo until 1896, when the Duke of Bedford oversaw their transfer to Woburn Abbey, Bedfordshire. More of the animals were imported and added to the herd over the next three decades. In 1929 and 1930, 32 deer were transferred from Woburn to Whipsnade, also in Bedfordshire, and released into the park. The current population of Chinese water deer at Whipsnade is estimated to be more than 600, while the population at Woburn is probably more than 250.

The majority of the current population of Chinese water deer in Britain derives from escapees, with the remainder being descended from many deliberate releases. Most of these animals still reside close to Woburn Abbey. The deer's apparent strong preference for a particular habitat – tall reed and grass areas in rich alluvial deltas – has restricted its potential to colonize further afield. The main area of distribution is from Woburn east into Cambridgeshire, Norfolk, Suffolk, and North Essex, and south towards Whipsnade. Small colonies have been reported in other areas. The British Deer Society coordinated a survey of wild deer in the United Kingdom between 2005 and 2007 and identified the Chinese water deer as "notably increasing its range" since the previous census in 2000.

=== France ===
A small population existed in France originating from animals that had escaped an enclosure in 1960 in western France (Haute-Vienne, near Poitiers). The population was reinforced in 1965 and 1970 and the species has been protected since 1973. Despite efforts to locate the animals with the help of local hunters, no sightings have occurred since 2000, and the population is assumed to be extinct.

=== Russia ===
On April 1, 2019, a water deer was spotted using a photo trap in the "Land of the Leopard" national park in the Khasan district of Primorsky Krai, Russia, 4.5 km from the border with China. In 2022, the population of water deer in Primorsky Krai was about 170 individuals. Thus, the water deer became the newest, and 327th, mammal species to be listed among the fauna of Russia.

== Morphology ==
=== Physical attributes ===
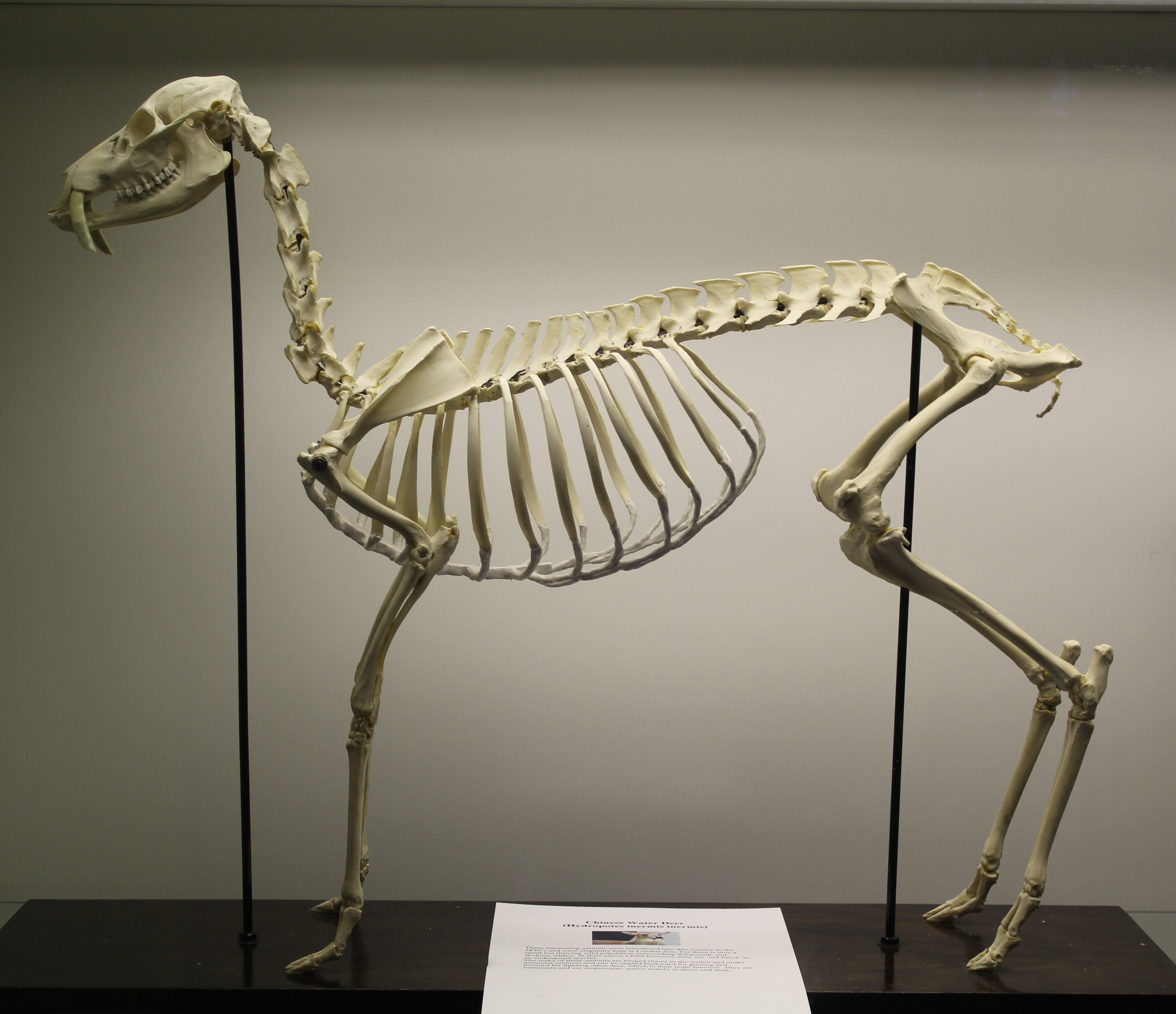
The skeleton of a water deer at the Royal Veterinary College

Body length	Shoulder height	Tail length	Weight
77.5–100 cm	42–65 cm	6–7.5 cm	9–14 kg
2.5–3.3 ft	18–22 in	2.4–3 in	20–31 lbs

The water deer has narrow pectoral and pelvic girdles, long legs, and a long neck. The powerful hind legs are longer than the front legs so that the haunches are carried higher than the shoulders. They run with rabbit-like jumps. In the groin of each leg is an gland used for scent marking; this deer is the only member of the Cervidae to possess such glands. The short tail is no more than 5–10 cm (2.0–3.9 in) in length and is almost invisible, except when it is held raised by the male during the rut. The ears are short and very rounded, and both sexes lack antlers.

The coat is an overall golden-brown color and may be interspersed with black hairs, while the undersides are white. The strongly tapered face is reddish-brown or gray, and the chin and upper throat are cream-colored. The hair is longest on the flanks and rump. In the fall, the summer coat is gradually replaced by a thicker, coarse-haired winter coat that varies from light brown to grayish brown. Neither the head nor the tail poles are well differentiated as in gregarious deer; consequently, this deer's coat is little differentiated. Young are born dark brown with white stripes and spots along their upper torsos.

=== Teeth ===
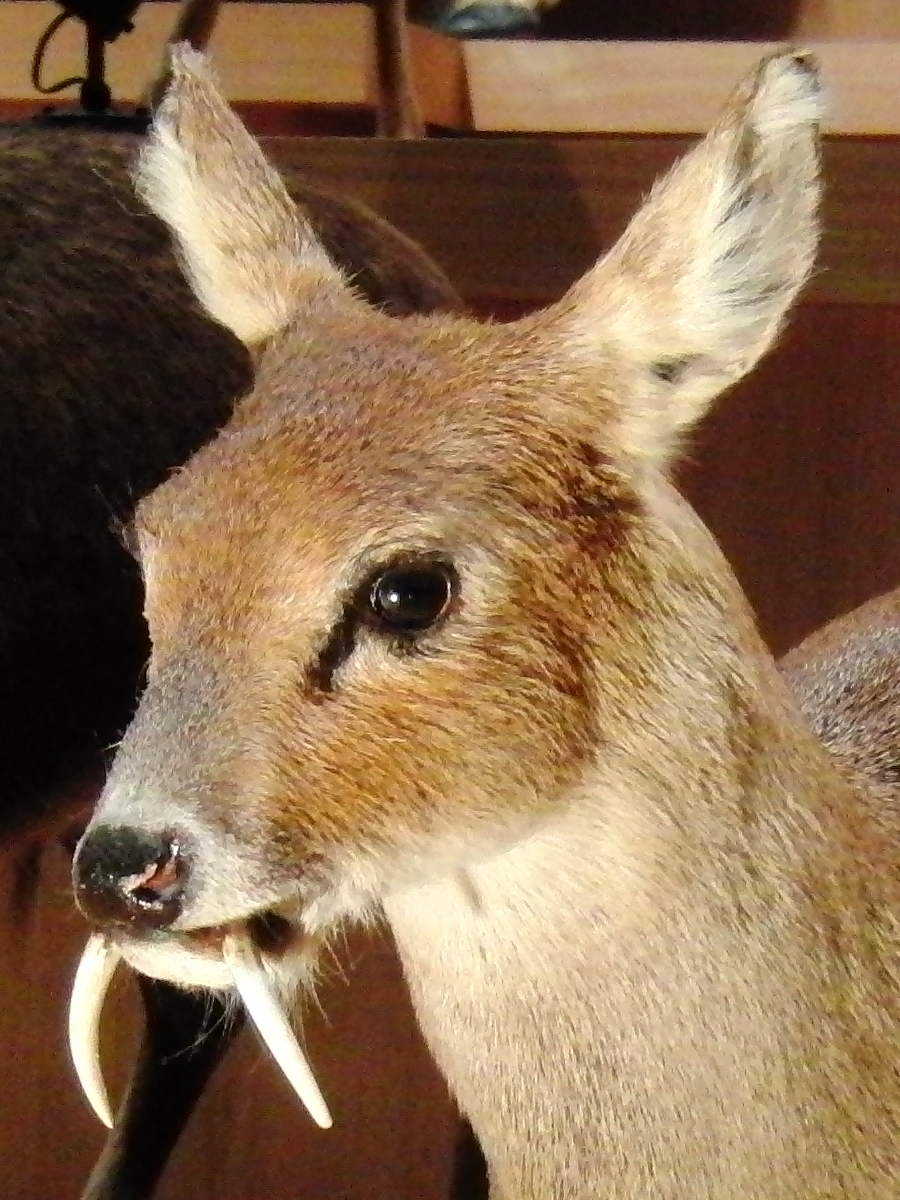
A stuffed specimen of H. inermis at the National Museum of Nature and Science, Tokyo, Japan

The water deer have long canine teeth which protrude from the upper jaw, like the canines of musk deer. These canines are an ancestral trait of all deer, but lost in most modern species, having been replaced in sexual selection by antlers. The canines are fairly large in the bucks, ranging in length from 5.5 cm (2.2 in) on average to as long as 8 cm (3.1 in). Does, in comparison, have tiny canines that are an average of 0.5 cm (0.2 in) in length.

The teeth usually erupt in the autumn of the deer's first year around 6–7 months of age. By early spring, the recently erupted tusks reach about 50% of their final length. As the tusks develop, the root remains open until the deer is about 18 to 24 months old. When fully grown, only about 60% of the tusk is visible below the gum.

These canines are held loosely in their sockets, with their movements controlled by facial muscles. The buck can draw them backwards out of the way when eating. In aggressive encounters, he thrusts his canines out and draws in his lower lip to pull his teeth closer together. He then presents an impressive, two-pronged weapon to rival males. Due to these teeth, this animal is sometimes referred to as a "vampire deer".

== Genetic diversity ==
The mitochondrial DNA of samples from the native Chinese population and the introduced UK population were analysed to infer each population's genetic structure and genetic diversity. The UK population was found to display lower levels of genetic diversity, and genetic differentiation exists between the native and introduced populations. The source population of the British deer was found to be likely extinct. This has implications for the conservation of the different populations, especially as H. inermis is classified as vulnerable in its native range according to the IUCN Red List.

== Behaviour ==
Apart from mating during the rutting season, water deer are solitary animals, and males are highly territorial. Each buck marks out his territory with urine and feces. Sometimes a small pit is dug and it is possible that in digging, the male releases scent from the interdigital glands on its feet. The male also scent-marks by holding a thin tree in his mouth behind the upper canines and rubbing his preorbital glands against it. Males may also bite off vegetation to delineate territorial boundaries.

Water deer use their tusks for territorial fights and are not related to carnivores. Confrontations between males begin with the animals walking slowly and stiffly towards each other, before turning to walk in parallel 10–20 m (33–66 ft) apart, to assess one another. At this point, one male may succeed in chasing off his rival, making clicking noises during the pursuit. However, if the conflict is not resolved at the early stage, the bucks will fight. Each would try to wound the other on the head, shoulders, or back, by stabbing or tearing with his upper canines. The fight is ended by the loser, who either lays his head and neck flat on the ground or turns tail and is chased out of the territory. Numerous long scars and torn ears seen on males indicate that fighting is frequent. The fights are seldom fatal but may leave the loser considerably debilitated. Tufts of hair are most commonly found on the ground in November and December, showing that encounters are heavily concentrated around the rut.

Females do not seem to be territorial outside the breeding season and can be seen in small groups, although individual deer do not appear to be associated; they will disperse separately at any sign of danger. Females show aggression towards each other immediately before and after the birth of their young and will chase other females from their birth territories.

=== Communication ===
Water deer are capable of emitting several sounds. The main call is a bark, which has more of a growling tone when compared with the sharper yap of a muntjac. The bark is used as an alarm, and water deer bark repeatedly at people and each other for reasons unknown. If challenged during the rut, a buck emits a clicking sound. How this unique sound is generated is unknown, although it is made possibly by using its molar teeth. During the rut, a buck following a doe makes a weak whistle or squeak. The does emit a soft "pheep" to call to their fawns, whilst an injured deer can emit a screaming wail.

=== Reproduction ===
Gestation period	Young per birth	Sexual maturity	Life span
170–210 days	Up to 8 (usually 2, occasionally 3)	7–8 months (does); 5–6 months (bucks)	10–12 years

During the annual rut in November and December, the male seeks out and follows females, giving soft, squeaking, contact calls and checking for signs of estrus by lowering his neck and rotating his head with ears flapping. Scent plays an important part in courtship, with both animals sniffing each other. Mating among water deer is polygynous, with most females being mated inside the buck's territory. After repeated mountings, copulation is brief.

Water deer can give birth to as many as eight young, more than any other deer species, although two or three is normal. The doe often gives birth to her spotted young in the open, but they are quickly taken to concealing vegetation, where they remain most of the time for up to a month. During these first few weeks, fawns come out to play. Once driven from the natal territory in late summer, young deer sometimes continue to associate with each other, later separating to begin their solitary existences. Young water deer are also known to grow faster and be more precocious in comparison to other similar species.

== See also ==
- Deer of Great Britain
