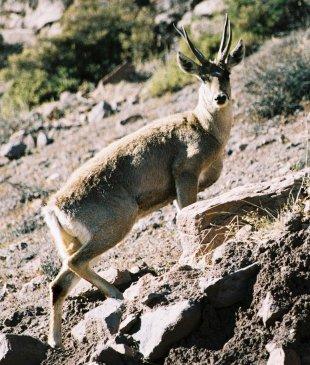
- The taruca

Scientific classification
- Kingdom: Animalia
- Phylum: Chordata
- Class: Mammalia
- Order: Artiodactyla
- Family: Cervidae
- Subfamily: Capreolinae
- Tribe: Odocoileini
- Genus: Hippocamelus; Leuckart 1816

Type species
- Hippocamelus dubius Leuckart, 1816

Species
- H. antisensis d'Orbigny 1834; H. bisulcus Molina 1782; †H. percultus; †H. sulcatus

= Hippocamelus =

Genus of deer

Hippocamelus is a genus of Cervidae, the deer family. It comprises two extant Andean and two fossil species. The living members are commonly known as the huemul (from the Mapuche language), and the taruca, also known as the northern huemul.

Both species have a stocky, thick, and short-legged body. They live at high altitudes in the summer. Though Taruca spend their whole life cycle at these high altitudes, especially as populations close to the equator, southern Huemul move down the mountains in the fall and spend the winter in sheltered forested valleys.

Areas with fresh water are preferred. They are herbivores that feed primarily on herbaceous plants and shrubs as well as sedges, lichens, and grasses found between the rocks on high peaks. They are active during the day and have a lifespan of about ten years.

== Extant species ==
=== Huemul ===
The huemul (Hippocamelus bisulcus), also known as the South Andean deer, is found in Chile and Argentina. Huemuls live in groups of varying size, typically of two or three individuals, but sometimes as many as eleven. In the past, groups of over a hundred deer were reported. Groups are made up of a female and her young, while males are often alone.

Huemuls occur in several national parks in Chile and neighbouring parts of Argentina and have been on the Endangered list since 1996. They are endangered primarily due to human impacts such as deforestation, habitat fragmentation by roads, introduction of non-native mammals such as farm animals, and poaching. They are in a classic "extinction spiral" marked by increasingly small, isolated populations.

The huemul is, along with the condor, the national animal of Chile.

=== Taruca ===
The taruca (Hippocamelus antisensis), also called Northern Huemul, is mainly found in Peru. Scattered populations are also found in high mountain regions of Bolivia, and in a less extent in northern Chile and Argentina, inhabiting treeless Puna grasslands. They live at high altitudes ranging from 3,500 to 5,200 meters above sea level.

Social habits include grazing in flexible groups of up to thirty animals consisting of one or two males and several females.

== Taxonomy and evolution ==
In 2008, a genetic study indicated that the huemul and taruca may not be closely related, and that the taruca should therefore be placed in a separate genus. This has been contradicted by more recent studies.

Fossils belonging to the now extinct species Hippocamelus sulcatus have been identified from Brazil, Uruguay, and Argentina. This species inhabited lowland plains habitats, rather than mountains, and lived between 1.5 and 0.5 million years ago, during the mid to late Pleistocene. Its exact relationship to the living species is unclear. A second fossil species, Hippocamelus percultus, is known from the Bolivian Andes, and lived around 40,000 to 20,000 years ago; it may be a direct ancestor of the living taruca.

== Conservation ==
Both species are threatened according to the IUCN. The Southern Hueamul is endangered and the taruca is listed as vulnerable.
