= Agalmaceros =

Agalmaceros Temporal range: Pleistocene (Uquian-Lujanian) ~2.588–0.012 Ma

Scientific classification
- Kingdom: Animalia
- Phylum: Chordata
- Class: Mammalia
- Order: Artiodactyla
- Family: Cervidae
- Subfamily: Capreolinae
- Genus: †Agalmaceros; Hoffstetter 1952
- Species: †A. blicki

Binomial name
- †Agalmaceros blicki Frick 1937

Extinct genus of deer

Agalmaceros is a potentially invalid extinct genus of deer of the Cervidae family, that lived in South America during the Pleistocene. The only species currently known is A. blicki. Remains have only been found in Ecuador. It showed a clear affinity to Andean or temperate habitats. Agalmaceros blicki is estimated to have been 60 kilograms (130 lb) in weight.

A 2023 paper considered another extinct South American deer genus, Charitoceros, a junior synonym of Agalmaceros; both taxa are diagnosed by the presence of thorns on their antlers. Furthermore, these thorns are symptoms of a pathology that also affects some extant deer; besides thorns, the antlers of Agalmaceros are identical to those of the modern white-tailed deer (Odocoileus virginianus) but larger . Thus, the authors consider Agalmaceros to be itself a junior synonym of O. virginianus, which would render both Agalmaceros and Charitoceros invalid taxa.
