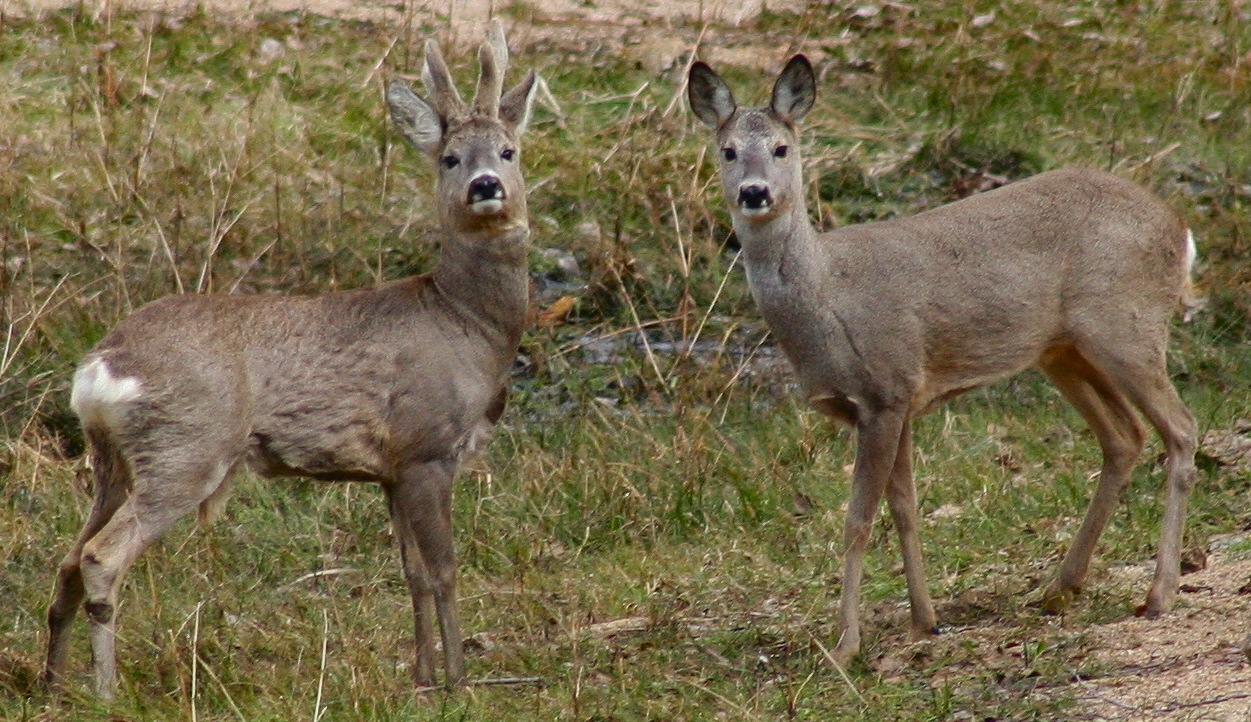
- Capreolus capreolus

Scientific classification
- Kingdom: Animalia
- Phylum: Chordata
- Class: Mammalia
- Order: Artiodactyla
- Family: Cervidae
- Subfamily: Capreolinae
- Tribe: Capreolini

Genera
- Capreolus; Hydropotes; †Procapreolus; †Pavlodaria?

= Capreolini =

Tribe of deer

Capreolini is a tribe of deer, containing two extant genera and one extinct genus. There are currently three extant species: the water deer, which is the only member of the genus Hydropotes, and European and Siberian roe deer, who comprise the genus Capreolus.

== Genera ==
- Extant genera
  - Capreolus
  - Hydropotes
- Extinct genera
  - †Procapreolus- Found during the Miocene/Pliocene boundary.
