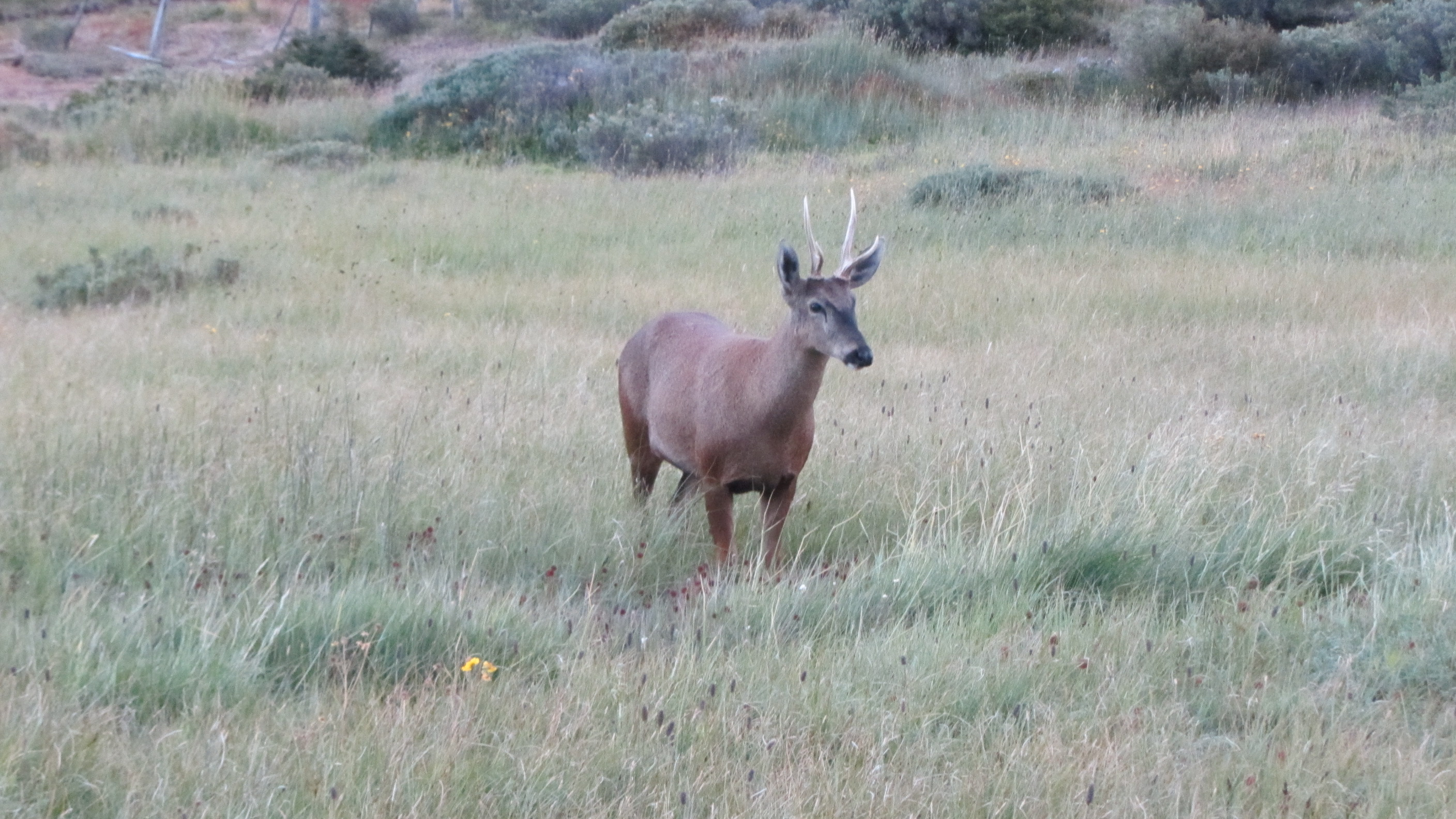

Conservation status
- Endangered (IUCN 3.1)
- CITES Appendix I

Scientific classification
- Kingdom: Animalia
- Phylum: Chordata
- Class: Mammalia
- Order: Artiodactyla
- Family: Cervidae
- Subfamily: Capreolinae
- Genus: Hippocamelus
- Species: H. bisulcus

Binomial name
- Hippocamelus bisulcus Molina, 1782
- Geographic range

= South Andean deer =

Species of deer

The south Andean deer (Hippocamelus bisulcus), also known as the southern guemal, south Andean huemul, southern huemul, or Chilean huemul or güemul (/ˈweɪmuːl/ WAY-mool, Spanish: [weˈmul]), is an endangered species of deer native to the mountains of Argentina and Chile. Along with the northern guemal or taruca, it is one of the two mid-sized deer in the Hippocamelus genus and ranges across the high mountainsides and cold valleys of the Andes. The distribution and habitat, behaviour, and diet of the deer have all been the subject of study. The viability of the small remaining population is an outstanding concern to researchers.

The huemul is part of Chile's national coat of arms and is since 2006 a National Natural Monument.

== Description ==
Coat of arms of Chile, huemul on left

The south Andean deer is well-adapted to broken, difficult terrain with a stocky build and short legs. A brown to greyish-brown coat tapers to white undersides and a white marked throat; the long, curled hairs of the coat provide protection against cold and moisture. Does are 70 to 80 kg. (154-176 lbs.) and stand 80 cm. (31 in.), while bucks are 90 kg (198 lbs.) and 90 cm (35 in). (Other weight suggestions are lower.) There is no sexual size difference amongst fawns, which are born unspotted.

Sexual dimorphism is notable. Only the bucks have antlers, which are shed each year toward the end of winter. Males also have a distinctive black "face mask", which curves into an elongated heart-shape surrounding a forehead of the principal brown colour. Unusually for a dimorphic ungulate, research has shown south Andean deer will congregate in mixed-sex groups, and the length of time spent inter-mixing increases with group size. The farther the animals are from rocky slopes the larger the size of observed groups, suggesting predation rates are lowest on slopes and greatest in open areas such as valley bottoms.

== Distribution and habitat ==
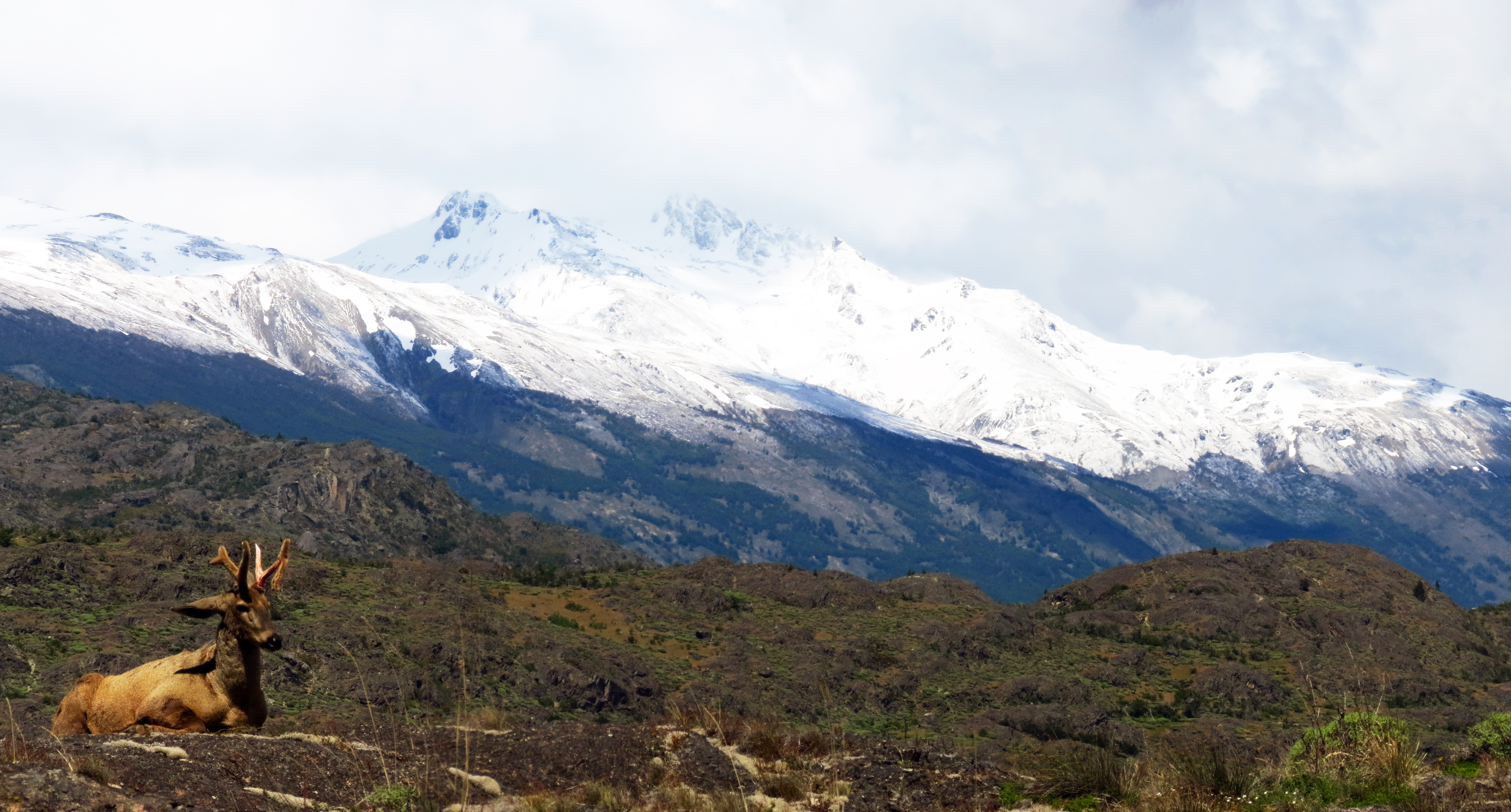
Huemul resting in Cochrane, Chile

This deer ranges across a variety of often difficult habitats. It usually prefers open periglacial scrubland, low bluffs, and other rocky areas, as well as upland forests and forest-borders. One study of coastal fjord populations found males and juveniles preferred periglacial grassland; females were mainly found on bluffs, and fawns exclusively so. Gunnera plants were a principal dietary item.

While it was previously found over much of southwestern South America, the current status of the south Andean deer is critical. Numbers in Argentina were estimated at 350–600, in fragmented groups, as of 2005. Argentinian national authorities have been criticized for calling the species' situation satisfactory, where research shows declining numbers; further research on habitat viability and conservation centers have been urged.

Pressures on huemul populations include economic activities and invasive species. One study in Argentina's Nahuel Huapi National Park found thirty-two plant items in its diet. The most common of these, the Lenga beech, was also a primary food item of the red deer, causing displacement to marginal areas and increased vulnerability for the smaller South Andean Deer. Both decreased reproduction rates and increased morbidity may be affecting the population in Argentina; predation by the cougar, the South Andean deer's only natural predator, remains a principal cause of mortality in Argentina.

== Conservation ==
According to the International Union for the Conservation of Nature (IUCN), the species' original global population is estimated to have suffered reductions of 99 per cent in size and more than 50 per cent in distribution range. Therefore, the species is listed as "Endangered" on the IUCN Red List. Habitat fragmentation and poaching remain the main threats to the species.

Under the auspices of the Convention on Migratory Species of Wild Animals (CMS) (the Bonn Convention), a Memorandum of Understanding (MoU) on the Conservation of the huemul was concluded between Argentina and Chile, and came into effect on 4 December 2010. The MoU aims to improve the conservation status of the species by close cooperation between the two range States, since the species migrates across the border region of these countries.

== Memorandum of Understanding on Conservation ==
Memorandum of Understanding on the Conservation of the South Andean Huemul
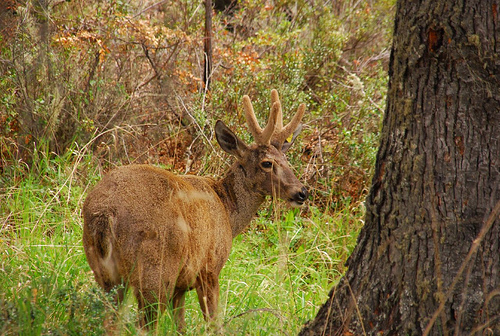
- Context: Nature conservation
- Effective: 4 December 2010
- Signatories: Argentina; Chile
- Languages: Spanish

The Memorandum of Understanding (MoU) on the Conservation of the South Andean Huemul is a Bilateral Environmental Memorandum of Understanding between the Argentine Republic and the Republic of Chile. It was concluded under the auspices of the Convention on the Conservation of Migratory Species of Wild Animals (CMS), also known as the Bonn Convention, on 4 December 2010 and came into effect immediately. The MoU has to improve the conservation status of the South Andean Huemul by close cooperation between the two range States, since the species migrate across the border region of these countries. The MoU covers two range States (the Argentine Republic and the Republic of Chile), both of which have signed.

=== Development of MoU ===
To implement the decision of the Fifth Conference of the Parties of CMS to list the South Andean Huemul (Hippocamelus bisulcus) on Appendix I of the Convention due to its worrying conservation status, an Article IV agreement was concluded between the two range States, the Argentine Republic and the Republic of Chile, and entered into effect immediately on 4 December 2010.

Signatories to South Andean Huemul MoU:

- The Argentine Republic (4 December 2010)
- The Republic of Chile (4 December 2010)

=== Aim of MoU ===
With fewer than an estimated 1500 animals in the wild, grouped in small, largely isolated populations in 2010, and due to the fact that the South Andean Huemul's habitat partly covers border areas between the two range States, both countries recognize the need to work in close collaboration in order to improve the situation and to prevent the species from extinction. Through this MoU both countries can take measures to address illegal hunting, habitat degradation, introduction of diseases and other threats to the species.

=== Species covered by MoU ===
The MoU protects all populations of the Huemul occurring within the range of Argentina and Chile. According to the International Union for the Conservation of Nature (IUCN), the species' original global population is estimated to have suffered reductions of 99 per cent in size and more than 50 per cent in distribution range. Therefore, the species is listed as "Endangered" on the IUCN Red List. Habitat fragmentation and poaching remain the main threats to the species.

=== Fundamental components ===
Both range States agree to work in close collaboration to:

1. Make efforts aimed at ensuring an effective protection of the populations of South Andean Huemul, shared by both countries, as well as at identifying and conserving those habitat which are essential for the survival of the species
2. Identify and monitor the factors and processes which have a detrimental effect on the conservation status of the species, such as illegal hunting, degradation of habitats and introduction of diseases, and recommend appropriate measures to regulate, manage and/or control those factors and processes
3. Elaborate a Bilateral Action Plan and report to the CMS Secretariat on its implementation
4. Facilitate the sharing of scientific, technical and legal information necessary to coordinate conservation measures and facilitate professional, technical and park ranger staff sharing, and cooperate with national and international specialists and organizations in the implementation of the Action Plan
5. Submit, at intervals of no more than one year, a report on the development of the MoU to the CMS Secretariat and the Sub-Commission for the Environment of Argentina and Chile, established within the framework of the Treaty of 2 August 1991 between the Argentine Republic and the Republic of Chile on the Environment
6. Hold annual meetings alternately in the territories of the two countries

The MoU took effect immediately following the signature by both range States (4 December 2010). It has a duration of three years and will be automatically renewed unless one Signatory withdraws from it.

=== Meetings ===
The MoU states that the two countries shall hold annual meetings, continuing the bilateral technical meetings held since 1992. In the framework of these meetings, the Action Plan implementation shall be evaluated and actions for the following year shall be planned and coordinated. Similarly, exchange of research results, as well as any other technical or legal information, which might be of benefit to the conservation of the species will be shared.

=== Secretariat ===
The secretariat functions are provided by the two Signatories themselves on a rotational basis. During the periods between the annual meetings, the country hosting the next meeting shall serve as interim Secretariat and shall be responsible also for the organization of the meeting. The CMS Secretariat – located in Bonn, Germany – only acts as a depositary of the MoU.

=== Action Plan ===
National technical agencies of the two countries are developing a joint, bi-national Action Plan, based on existing national plans. This Action Plan will promote the exchange of scientific, technical and legal information as well as training of professional staff and park rangers to coordinate conservation measures. Research will be promoted to better understand the ecology and biology of the species as well as factors preventing the recovery of individual groups. Monitoring will be enhanced to collect more data on distribution, abundance and threats. Educational activities and media campaigns will raise awareness about the Huemul's poor conservation status.

=== Activities ===
Between September 26 and 27 2011 a workshop entitled "Towards an Action Plan for the Conservation of Huemul in the Austral Zone" was held in Valdivia, Chile. The purpose of this workshop was to develop the preliminary guidelines for the bi-national Action Plan.

Meanwhile, Argentina has taken some actions to implement the national plans. These include monitoring in the Los Alerces National Park, new Huemul survey work in Estancia Los Huemules, and continued updating of a database of records maintained by the National Parks Administration for both protected and unprotected areas. Contributions have been made to a study of the phylogeography and demographic history of the Huemul by Bio-Bio University in Chile. Work has also been underway in Argentina to update the management plans for the Lanín National Park and the Andino Norpatagónica Biosphere Reserve, with specific reference to measures for Huemul conservation. A project proposal has been developed for controlling livestock in the area occupied by Huemuls in the Los Alerces National Park. Awareness activities have included public talks, production of a two booklet on the conservation of the species linked to the Andino Norpatagónica Biosphere Reserve, and posters distributed in three of the country's National Parks.

In Chile, similar activities are underway, with an emphasis on monitoring by rangers of hunting, and future plans for reintroduction work, measures to reduce habitat competition with livestock, awareness raising and strengthening of regulations.
