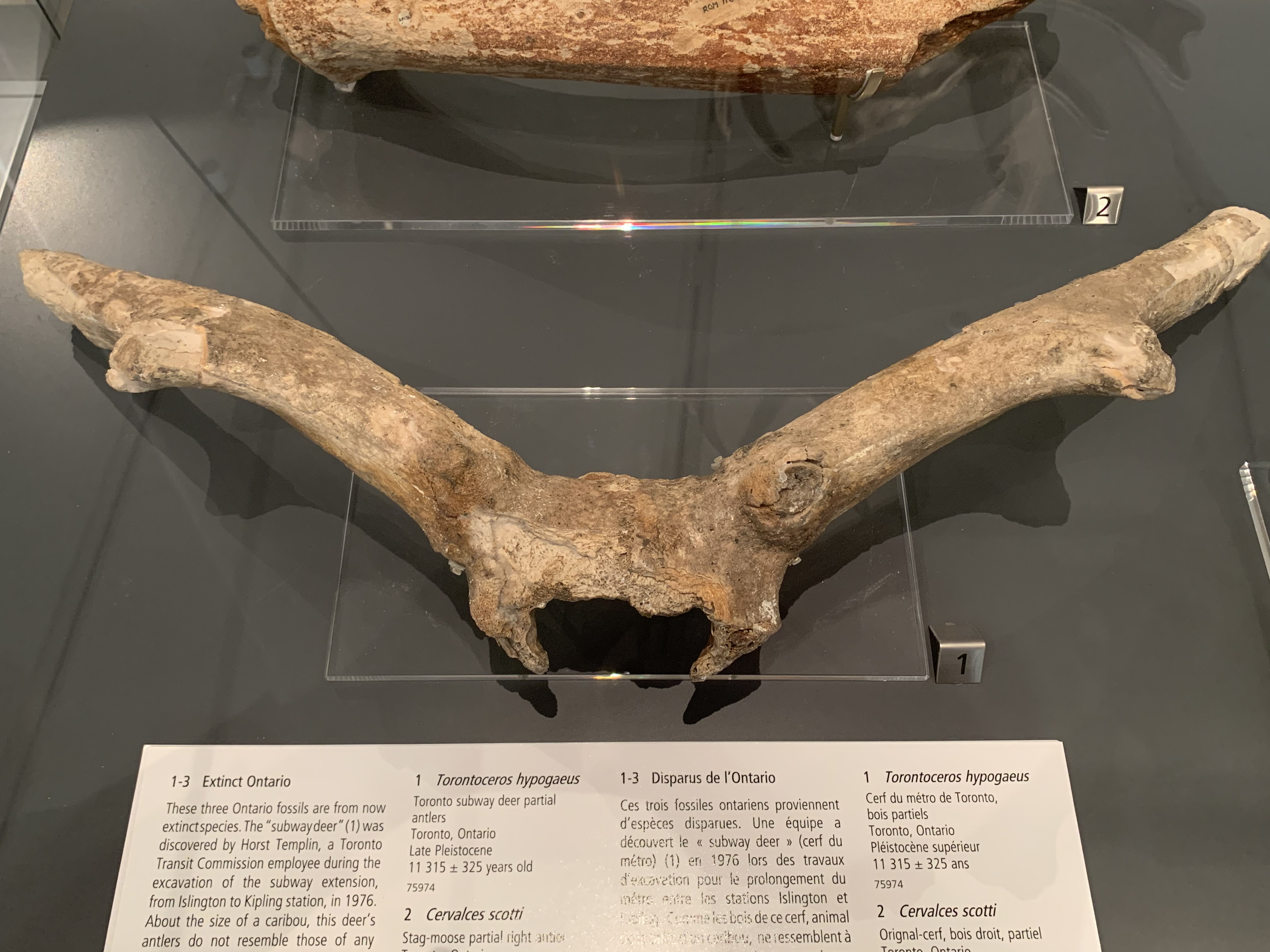
- Fossil on display at the Royal Ontario Museum

Scientific classification
- Kingdom: Animalia
- Phylum: Chordata
- Class: Mammalia
- Order: Artiodactyla
- Family: Cervidae
- Subfamily: Capreolinae
- Genus: †Torontoceros; Churcher and Peterson, 1982

Type species
- †Torontoceros hypogaeus Churcher and Peterson, 1982

= Torontoceros =

Torontoceros Temporal range: Late Pleistocene ~0.012–0.011 Ma

Extinct genus of deer

Torontoceros ("horn of Toronto") is an extinct genus of deer, with a single species T. hypogaeus, nicknamed the Toronto subway deer due its only known remains (a partial skull with damaged antlers) having been found during the excavation of the Toronto subway line. It lived in the Late Pleistocene (around 12,000 - 11,000 years ago) in Ontario while likely being native over a larger area. Genetic evidence indicates that Torontoceros is likely a synonym of Odocoileus, and it is unclear whether it represents a distinct extinct species of Odocoileus or is a synonym of one of the living species.

== Discovery ==
Fossils of Torontoceros were first unearthed in 1977 from Late Pleistocene deposits exposed during the construction of the Bloor-Danforth subway line in Toronto, Canada. It was later described by Canadian paleontologists C. S. Churcher and R. L. Peterson in 1982 as a new genus and species of cervid after the specimen had been donated to the Royal Ontario Museum, where the fossils were housed under specimen number ROMM 75974. The fossils were incomplete, consisting only of a damaged braincase with attached antlers, though they were noted to be very heavily-built for the size of the animal.

The species name hypogaeus comes from the Greek words for below and earth, as it was found several metres underground.

== Description ==
Torontoceros is known only from a partial skull. This animal is believed to have been as large as a current caribou, with its appearance also reminiscent of it. The large antlers, however, appear to have been much larger and heavier than those of the present forms. The surface of the pedicles indicates that the Torontoceros specimen had died in the spring, when the antlers were still covered with velvet and not yet fully developed.

== Classification ==
Torontoceros is a member of the Capreolinae subfamily of deer. A 2025 genetic study determined that was closely related to the genus Odocoileus, which in northern North America includes white-tailed deer and mule deer, rather than the caribou that Torontoceros is thought to have resembled. The authors proposed that Torontoceros is not a valid genus, but a synonym of Odocoileus, and that the species represented either an extinct species of Odocoileus or a synonym of one of the living Odocoileus species.

== Paleoecology ==
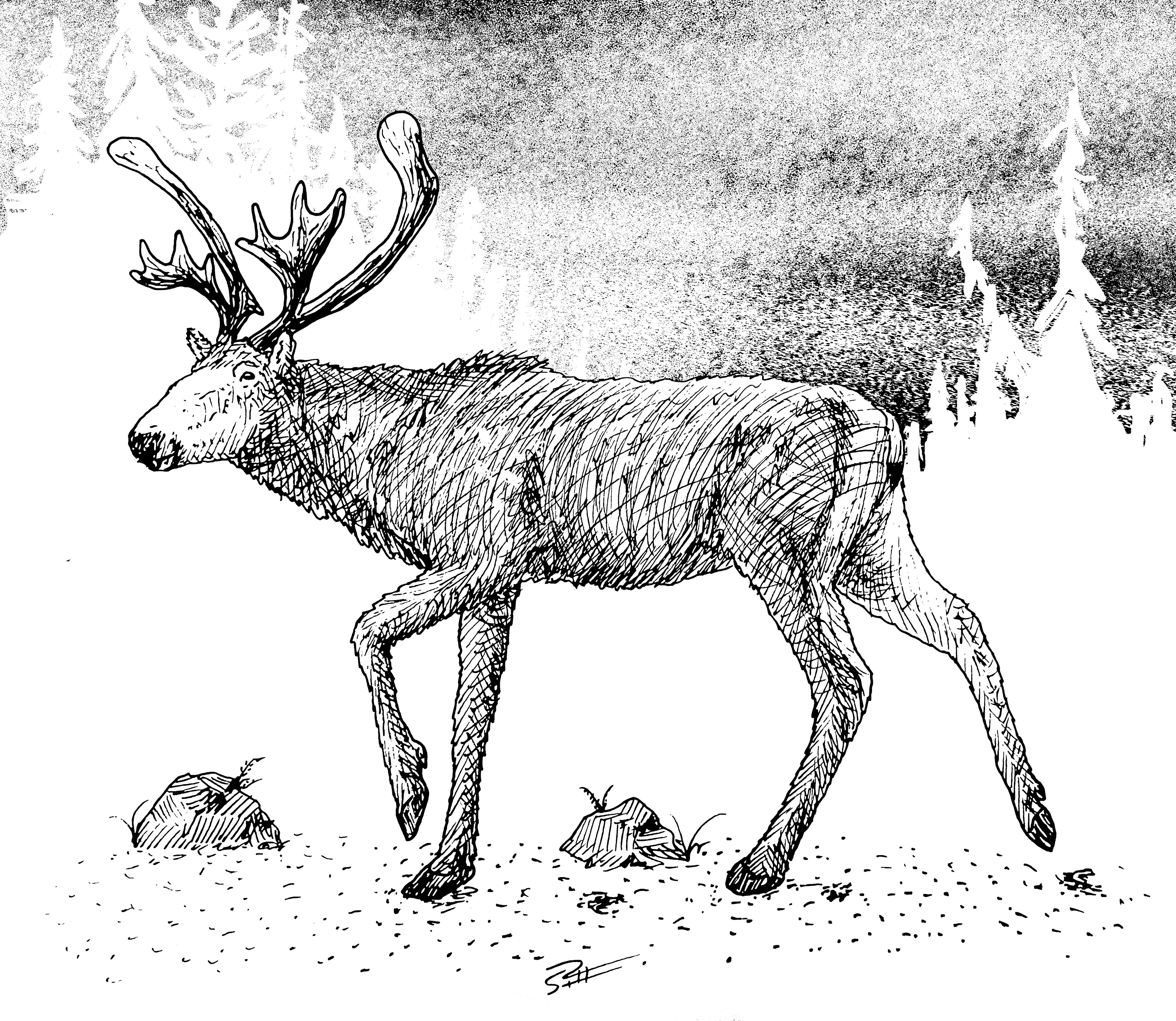

Fossil pollen found on the site indicates that Torontoceros lived in an environment consisting of deciduous forests and coniferous forests at the end of the last ice age.
