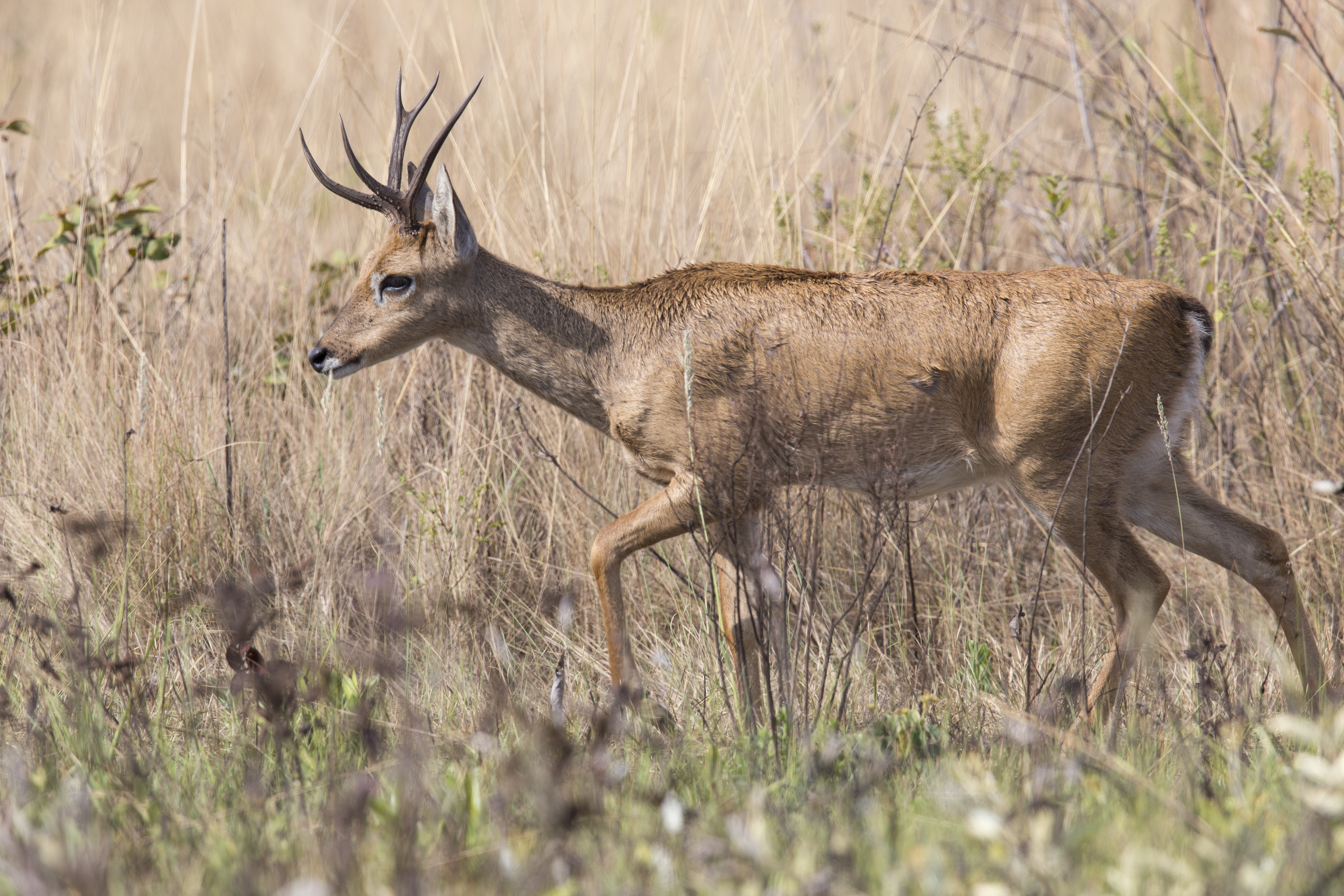
- Male Pampas deer in Serra da Canastra National Park
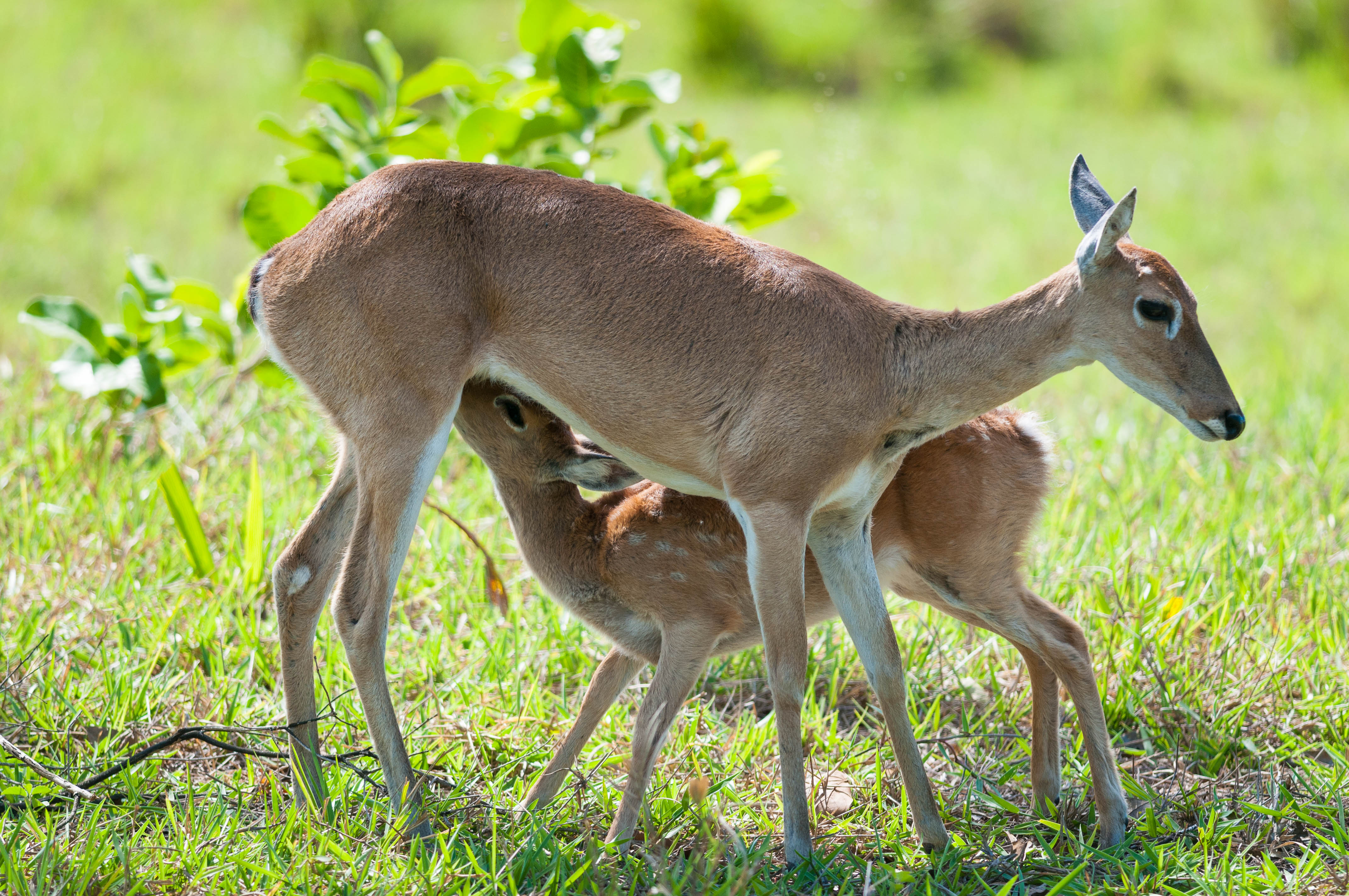
- Female Pampas deer nursing fawn in the Pantanal, Brazil

Conservation status
- Near Threatened (IUCN 3.1)
- CITES Appendix I

Scientific classification
- Kingdom: Animalia
- Phylum: Chordata
- Class: Mammalia
- Infraclass: Placentalia
- Order: Artiodactyla
- Family: Cervidae
- Subfamily: Capreolinae
- Genus: Ozotoceros; Ameghino, 1891
- Species: O. bezoarticus

Binomial name
- Ozotoceros bezoarticus (Linnaeus, 1758)

Synonyms
- Cervus bezoarticus Linnaeus, 1758

= Pampas deer =

Species of mammals

The Pampas deer (Ozotoceros bezoarticus) is a species of deer that live in the grasslands of South America at low elevations. They are known as veado-campeiro in Portuguese and as venado or gama in Spanish. It is the only species in the genus Ozotoceros.

Their habitat includes water and hills, often with winter drought, and grass that is high enough to cover a standing deer. Many of them live on the Pantanal wetlands, where there are ongoing conservation efforts, and other areas of annual flooding cycles. Human activity has changed much of the original landscape.

They are known to live up to 12 years in the wild, longer if captive, but are threatened due to over-hunting and habitat loss. Since a healthy deer population means a healthy grassland, and a healthy grassland is home to many species, some also threatened. Many North American birds migrate south to these areas, and if the Pampas deer habitat is lost, they are afraid these bird species will also decline. There are approximately 80,000 Pampas deer total, with the majority of them living in Brazil.

== Taxonomy and evolution ==
Fossil records indicate that New World deer traveled to South America from North America as part of the Great American Interchange around 2.5 million years ago, following the formation of the Isthmus of Panama. They rapidly evolved into different species, with only a few surviving today. Due to the large continental glaciers and the high soil acidity in areas where there were no glaciers, a huge part of the fossil record has been destroyed, so there is no indication of what these early New World deer looked like. Fossil records begin with clear differentiation and are close to what they look like now. The Pampas deer evolved as a plains animal; their direct ancestor first appeared during the Pleistocene epoch.

The deer may have evolved in the absence of pack‐hunting cursorial predators, as, when alarmed, they do not flee immediately but rather stamp their feet (like many deer), have a particular trot and whistle, and deposit odor. However, feline predators, such as the puma (Puma concolor) and jaguar (Panthera onca), and even the ocelot (Leopardus pardalis), were once far more prevalent across the deer's range and were likely to have been their main threats. It is possible that with the general decline of these predators, Pampas deer have evolved to be less fearful, a potential detriment to the species' longevity. Pampas deer have a similar gene pattern to the related marsh deer (Blastocerus dichotomus), having two fused chromosomes.

There are five recognised subspecies:

- O. b. bezoarticus – eastern and central Brazil, south of the Amazon river into Uruguay
- O. b. arerunguaensis – northwestern Uruguay
- O. b. celer – Southern Argentina, to La Pampa and Buenos Aires Province
- O. b. leucogaster – southwestern Brazil, southeastern Bolivia, Paraguay, and northern Argentina
- O. b. uruguayensis – eastern Uruguay

Pampas deer are among the most genetically polymorphic mammals. Their current high nucleotide diversity shows that they had very large numbers in the recent past.

== Physical characteristics ==
Pampas deer have tan fur, lighter on their undersides and insides of legs. Their coats do not change with the seasons. They have white spots above their lips and white patches on their throats. Their shoulder height is 60–65 cm (24–26 in) in females and 65–70 cm (26–28 in) in males. Their tails are short and bushy, 10–15 cm (3.9–5.9 in) long, and when they run, they lift their tail to reveal a white patch, just like white-tailed deer.

Adult males typically weigh 24–34 kg (53–75 lb), but have been documented up to 40 kg (88 lb), and females typically weigh 22–29 kg (49–64 lb). They are a small species of deer, with relatively little sexual dimorphism. Males have small, lightweight antlers that are 3-pronged, which go through a yearly cycle of shedding in August or September, with a new grown set by December. The lower front main prong of the antlers is not divided, but the upper prong is. Females have hair whorls that look like tiny antlers stubs. Females and males have different stances during urination. Males have a strong smell secreted from glands in their back hooves that can be detected up to 1.5 km away. Compared to other small ruminants, the males have small testicles relative to their body size.

== Biology and behavior ==
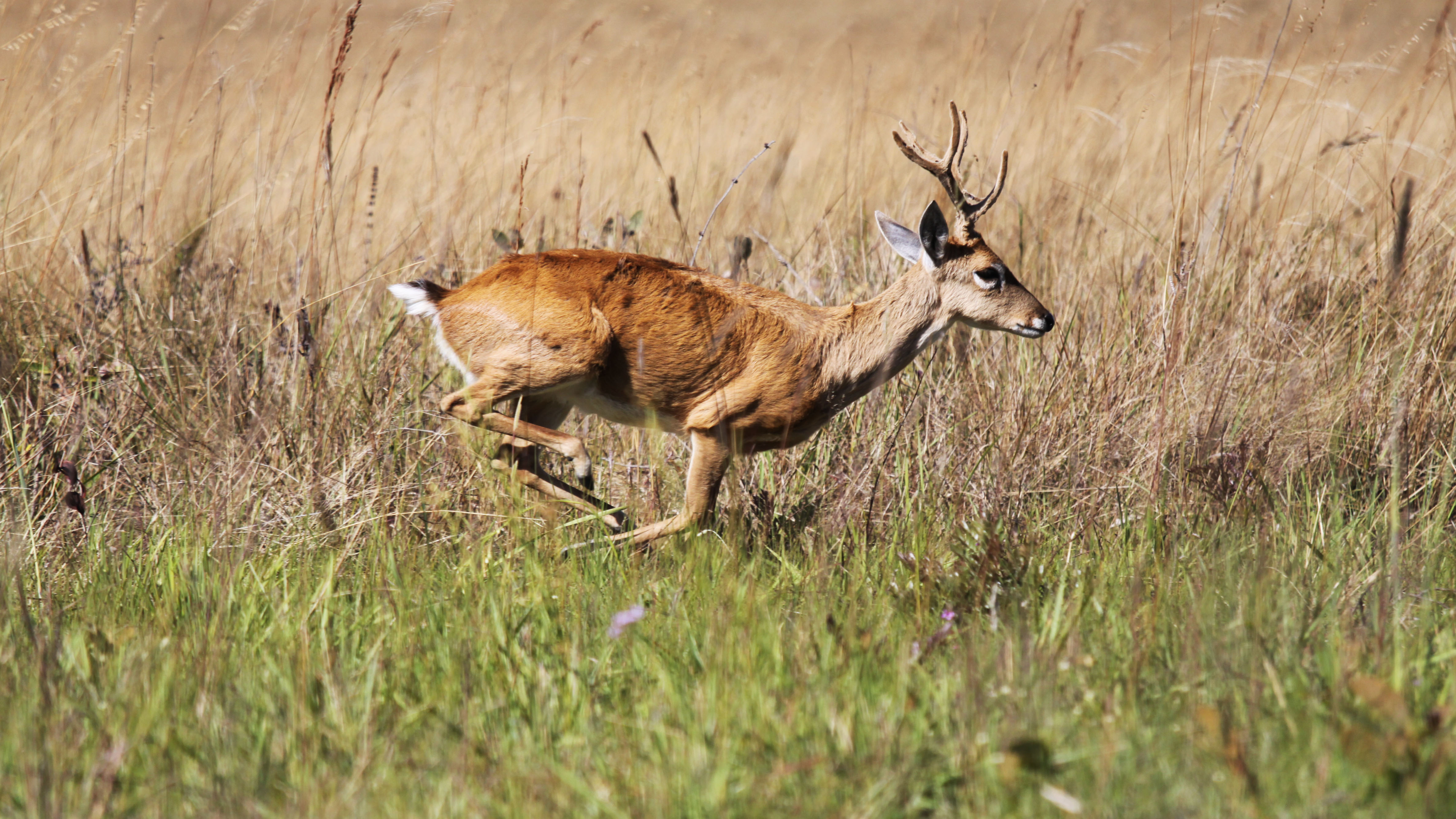
Pampas deer running in Serra da Canastra National Park

In Argentina, the mating season is December to February. In Uruguay, the mating season is February to April. Courtship behavior is submissive, such as low stretching, crouching, and turning away. The male initiates courtship with a low stretch. He makes a soft buzzing sound. He nuzzles the female and may flick his tongue at her, and averts his eyes. He stays near her, and may follow her for a long time, smelling her urine. Sometimes the female responds to courtship by lying on the ground.

Pampas deer do not defend territory or mates, but do have displays of dominance. They show dominance by keeping their heads up and trying to keep their side forward, and use slow, deliberate movements. When bucks are challenging each other, they rub their horns into vegetation and scrape them on the ground. They may urinate into the scrape they have made, and sometimes defecate. They rub the scent glands on their heads and faces into plants and objects. They usually do not fight, but just spar with each other, and they do commonly bite. Sparring is initiated by the smaller buck touching noses with the larger buck. Groups are not separated by sex, and bucks will drift between groups. There are usually only 2–6 deer in a group, but there can be many more in good feeding areas. They do not have monogamous pairs, nor are there harems.

When they feel they may be in danger, they hide low in the foliage and hold, and then bound off about 100–200 meters (330–660 ft), often looking back at the disturbance. Because they bound in long flat jumps and have not been observed to run, they are not thought to be endurance runners. If they are alone, they may just quietly slip away. Females with a fawn will fake a limp to distract a predator, or if they are unsure of a situation, such as if a human appears.

They will often stand on their hind legs to reach food or see over something. They are sedentary, with no seasonal or even daily movements. They usually feed regularly during the day, but sometimes have nocturnal activity. The Pampas deer are very curious and like to explore. Although this is endearing to observers, their lack of fleeing at the sight of humans makes them easier for poachers to kill.

=== Diet ===
Pampas deer have been seen eating new green growth, shrubs, and herbs. Most of the plant life they consume grows in moist soils. To see if Pampas deer compete with cattle for food, their feces were studied and compared to cattle feces. They do in fact eat the same plants, but in different proportions. The pampas deer eat less grass and more forbs (flowering broad leafed plants with soft stems) and browse (shoots, leaves, and twigs), respectively. During the rainy season, 20% of their diet consists of new grasses. They will move with the availability of food, particularly the flowering plants. The presence of cattle increases the amount of sprouting grass, which is preferred by Pampas deer, furthering the idea that the deer do not compete with cattle for food. Opposing research shows that Pampas deer avoid areas inhabited by cattle, and when cattle are absent have much larger home ranges.

=== Reproduction and calves ===
Fawns can be seen at any time of year, but there is a peak in September and November. Females separate themselves from the group to give birth, and keep the fawn hidden away. After giving birth, the female goes into heat and usually mates within the next 48 hours. The fawns are small and spotted, and lose their spots at about two months old. Usually only one fawn weighing about 2.2 kg (4.9 lb) is born after a gestation period lasting over seven months. At six weeks, they can eat solid food and begin to follow their mother. They stay with their mothers for at least a year, and also reach sexual maturity at about a year.

== Conservation ==
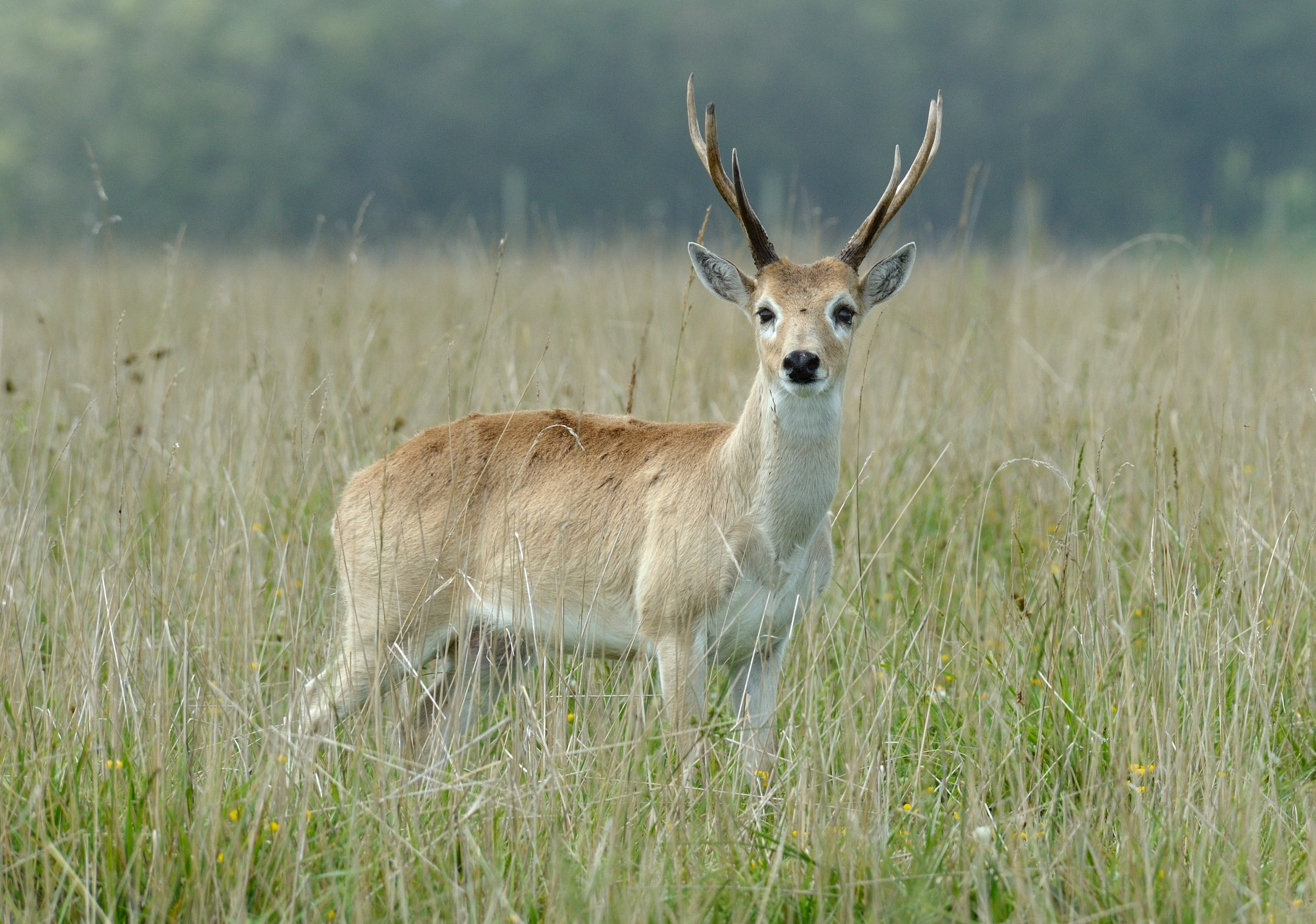
Pampas deer taken in a ranch in Rocha Department, Uruguay (2015)

The Pampas deer of southern Argentina, once very abundant, are now considered a threatened species by the IUCN. The IUCN separates the subspecies O. b. celer in southern Argentina as endangered. The diseases that particularly plague O. b. celer are gut parasites and foot and mouth diseases. Their overall decline is also due (in part) from hunting and poaching, but also from agricultural habitat loss (thus exposing deer to diseases from domesticated and feral livestock), competition from more recently-introduced wildlife, and general over-exploitation. There is less than 1% of their natural habitat left that was present in 1900. The deer in Argentina and Uruguay have fewer natural predators. They used to be the prey of cougars and many more jaguars. Those in Brazil still have the felines to fear. Some areas with low population are easily attributed to poaching, due to a sudden lower number of deer in an area. In the mid-1970s, ten individuals, out of a group of 16 located in Punta Medanos, were killed by poachers. The rest were extirpated by extensive human activity. Lack of funding and technology have made it difficult for biologists to track and aid the deer population, while donations and grants from organizations and universities in the United States have helped immensely with the situation. In 1975, there were less than 100 of the subspecies O. b. celer, but by 1980, there were around 400. The population has been continuing to increase, although not at an incredibly fast pace. One of the discrepancies is simply the fact that, later on, previously unknown subspecies and groups were discovered.

Local people often blame the deer for outbreaks of disease in their livestock, particularly Brucellosis in cattle. In one instance, the Uruguayan government was going to cull some of their Pampas deer population, until research by field veterinarians had shown that Pampas deer rarely carry the disease. Only then did the government give them time to assess the deer's health. Funded by the Disney Conservation Fund, they were able to prove that the deer pose no threat of spreading disease to livestock.

Trade for commercial purposes is banned. They are legally protected in Argentina, where there is a private and federal reserve set aside for the deer. In some areas, strict regulations on poaching is all that was necessary to quickly increase the population size. Increasing public knowledge, and monitoring road construction operations, has also helped. They reproduce well in captivity, and are sometimes reintroduced into the wild.

In 2006, GPS trackers were placed on 19 Pampas deer, although 8 of those did not record data. The individuals were monitored over a period of 4–18 days, for researchers to collect data on their movements, and thus understand how to better help them.

== Relations with humans and culture ==
Over the centuries, especially since European colonization, Pampas deer have been harvested in their millions. In the 1860s, documents for the Port of Buenos Aires indicate that some two million Pampas deer pelts were sent to Europe during the decade, alone. Many years later, as infrastructure was being built throughout the pampas, roads and automobiles made hunting even easier. The deer were also killed for food, medicinal purposes, and purely for sport. As of 2003, there are fewer than 2,000 Pampas deer in Argentina and Uruguay. Both countries have declared the species to be a "natural monument" and yet the hunting continues, albeit somewhat less frequently.

The decline of the Pampas deer has been likened to that of the once-plentiful bison of North America, as the deer were once far greater in number, and held a similar place in the survival and spirituality of the native peoples of the region, including the Guaraní. The deer were revered; not only were they hunted, their carcasses blessed, and spirits thanked for their sacrifice, but the entire animal would be utilized for food, building materials, weapons, clothing, medicine, and more. Historically, the native peoples of northern Argentina, Paraguay and Uruguay participated in the sale of Pampas deer pelts for export, and yet the animals persevered until European powers ultimately took over. The settlers brought with them mass agricultural expansion and uncontrolled, unregulated hunting of wildlife, as well as new, lethal pathogens with the arrival of domesticated livestock. Escaped farm animals formed feral populations, thus competing with the Pampas deer and other local species for resources, in addition to exposing them to potential new diseases.

Some landowners have set aside areas of their properties as undisturbed or native habitat for the deer, as well as keeping cattle instead of sheep or goats; sheep and goats compete more directly with the deer as they also browse on shrubbery and tall vegetation, far more than the grazing cattle. The landowners that choose cattle are doing it as a service, however, as sheep are far more lucrative to raise than cattle. Conservationists encourage this trend, sharing research that more edible vegetation is available on ranches with cattle and deer during times of drought than on ranches with cattle and sheep.
