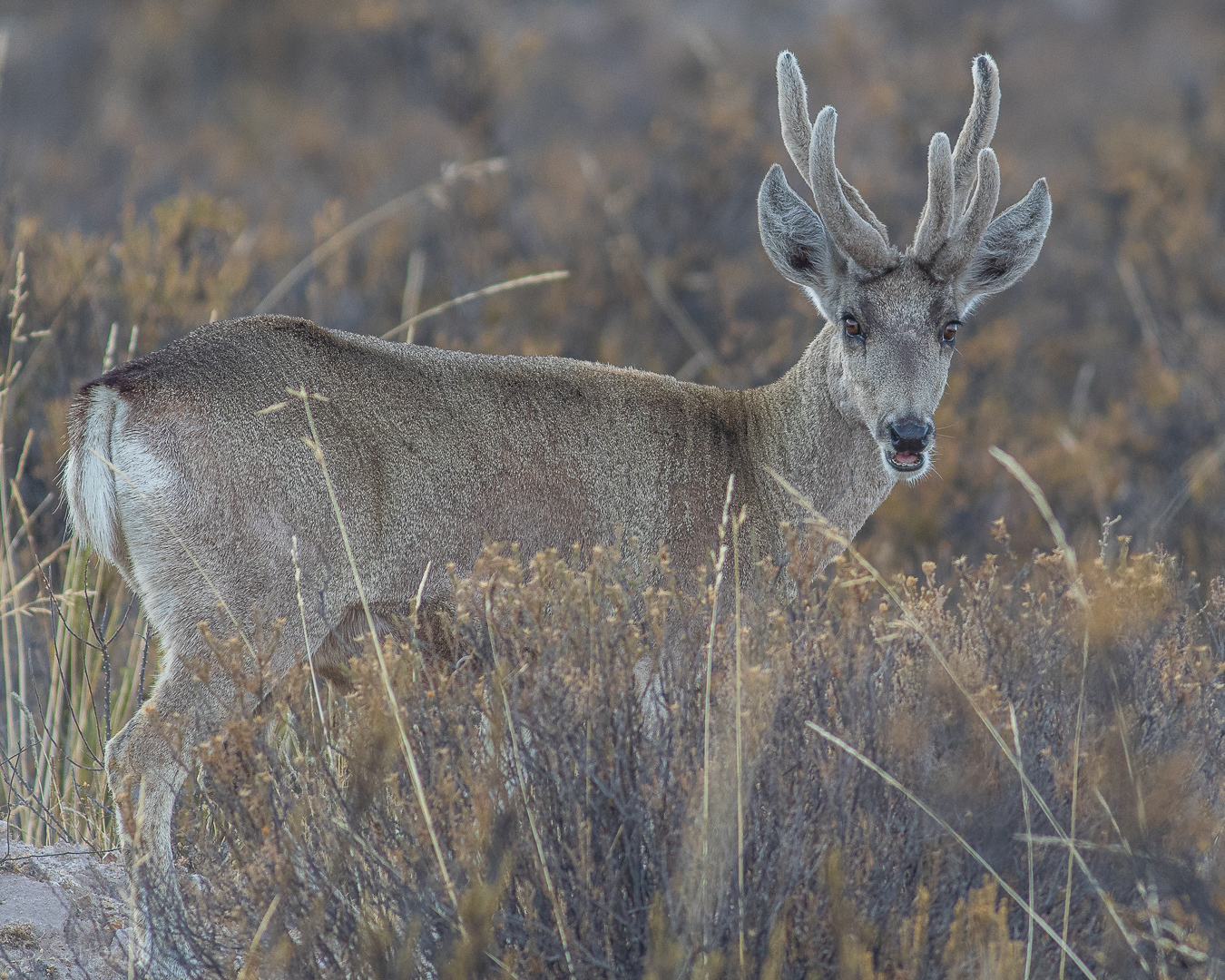
- Male in Lauca National Park, Chile

Conservation status
- Vulnerable (IUCN 3.1)
- CITES Appendix I

Scientific classification
- Kingdom: Animalia
- Phylum: Chordata
- Class: Mammalia
- Order: Artiodactyla
- Family: Cervidae
- Subfamily: Capreolinae
- Genus: Hippocamelus
- Species: H. antisensis

Binomial name
- Hippocamelus antisensis (d'Orbigny, 1834)
- Geographic range

= Taruca =

Species of deer

The taruca (Hippocamelus antisensis), also known as the taruka, Peruvian guemal, north Andean deer, north Andean huemul, northern huemul or northern guemal, is a mid sized deer species that inhabits the high regions of the Andes mountains in South America. The common name taruca means "deer" in both the Quechua and Aymara languages. The taruca is closely related to the southern guemal (H. bisulcus), the only other member of the Hippocamelus genus.

== Description ==
The taruca is a medium-sized deer with a heavy body. It measures 128 to 146 cm (50 to 57 in) from head to rump, with an 11 to 13 cm (4.3 to 5.1 in) tail, and stands 69 to 80 cm (27 to 31 in) tall at the shoulder. Adults weigh between 69 and 80 kg (152 and 176 lb). As with most deer, males are significantly larger than females.

It has sandy brown fur over most of its body, with white patches on the underside of its head, neck, tail, and genital region, and on the inner surface of its fore-legs. While females often have a dark brown area on the forehead, facial markings are much clearer in the males. The exact patterns vary between different males, but in general there is a black mask behind the nose, and a black Y or V pattern over the forehead and snout.

As other deer, only male tarucas typically grow antlers. The longer tine of a full grown male generally measures around 30 cm (12-inch). Unlike other South American deer, except for the closely related huemul, the antlers consist of just two tines which branche from the base, and with the posterior tine being the larger. Males also possess canine teeth in their upper jaw, which females usually, but not always, lack.

== Distribution and habitat ==
Tarucas are found only in the Andes mountains, from central Peru, through Bolivia and extreme north-eastern Chile, and into northern Argentina. It was believed that tarucas also occurred in Ecuador, but no evidence supports these claims.

Peru holds the largest population of tarucas in South America. In 2008 it was suggested that between 9,000 and 12,000 individuals lived across the central Andes mountains. The Huancabamba depression marks the northern limit of the species distribution. Tarucas live at altitudes ranging from 3,500 m (11,500 ft) to 5,000 m (16,000 ft), and at lower altitudes within that range, might share territory with the Peruvian whitetail deer that are also endemic to the region. In Argentina, tarucas are found at altitudes of 2,000 m (6,600 ft) to 3,000 m (9,800 ft) where they occupy grasslands marked by occasional shrubs and rocky outcrops, typically near water. There are no recognised subspecies.

== Diet and behaviour ==
Tarucas are mainly found in rocky slopes, queñual forests and at puna grasslands by the side of glaciar lakes at high altitude mountain terrains. Despite living in grasslands, the taruca feeds mainly on the local bushes, shrubs, and herbs for much of the year, but supplements this diet with grasses during the rainy season. Plants commonly eaten include dwarf gentian, ragworts, lupins, senna, valerian, and clubmosses. Tarucas may also feed on agricultural crops, such as alfalfa, barley, and potato plants.

Tarucas are gregarious, but do not live in stable herds, with individuals moving between groups of up to thirty members each over the course of a few days. Their populations are scattered, due to their need for relatively specialised habitats, with population densities as low as 0.15/km^{2} (0.39/sq mi), even away from human habitation. Individual groups are typically led by the females. During the breeding season, males may compete with one another, displaying threatening behaviour by raising their forelegs one at a time and pointing their antlers towards one another.

== Reproduction ==
The rut lasts from May to July, during which time the deer segregate into smaller groups with a single adult male. Males drop their antlers immediately after the breeding season finishes, in September, with the new pair beginning to grow in December, and losing the velvet by February. Pregnancy lasts for 240 days, so that the single fawn is born between January and March, coinciding with the rainy season. Twins have been observed in captivity, but are rare. The mother leaves the group in order to give birth, and keeps the fawn hidden behind rocky outcrops for the first month of life.
