= Gallicus =

Gallicus is the Latin term to refer to someone or something from Gaul or France.

Gallicus may refer to:

== People ==
- Johannes de Garlandia (music theorist) (fl. c.1270–1320), French music theorist sometimes referred to as Johannes Gallicus
- Johannes Gallicus (humanist) (c.1415-1473), French humanist sometimes referred to as Johannes Gallicus
- Quintus Julius Cordinus Gaius Rutilius Gallicus (fl. 70–85), Roman senator and consul

== Literature and education ==
- Mars gallicus, a 1635 pamphlet written by Cornelius Jansen
- Syphilis sive morbus gallicus ("Syphilis or The French Disease"), an epic poem written in 1530 by Girolamo Fracastoro

== Locations ==
- Ager Gallicus, a pre-Roman territory in northern Italy
- Gulf of Lion, formerly known as sinus Gallicus, an embrayment of the Mediterranean coastline in Spain and France

== Taxonomy ==
- Aegialornis gallicus, a species of prehistoric apodiform birds of the family Aegialornithidae
- Alces gallicus, a.k.a. Villafranchian elk, weighing scale elk, or Gallic moose, an extinct species of moose of the Genus Alces
- Bolbelasmus gallicus, a species of beetles of the genus Bolbelasmus
- Cervalces gallicus, an extinct species of deer
- Ceuthonectes gallicus, a species of copepods of the genus Ceuthonectes
- Clonopsis gallica, sometimes referred to as Bacillus gallicus or Clonopsis gallicus, a stick insect species of the genus Clonopsis
- Cylindromorphus gallicus, a species of jewel beetles of the genus Cylindromorphus
- Dianthus hyssopifolius, a.k.a. fringed pink, sometimes referred to as Dianthus gallicus, a species of flowering plant of the family Caryophyllaceae
- Gallic horse (taxonomic name: Equus caballus gallicus), a prehistoric subspecies of horse
- Isotomurus gallicus, a species of elongate-bodied springtails of the genus Isotomurus
- Libralces gallicus, an extinct species of Eurasian deer
- Map-winged swift, sometimes referred to as Hepialus gallicus, a moth belonging to the family Hepialidae
- Maso gallicus, a species of dwarf spiders of the genus Maso (spider)
- Metajapyx gallicus, a species of forcepstail of the family Japygidae
- Micrurus gallicus, an extinct species of coral snake
- Modiolus gallicus, a species of horsemussel of the genus Modiolus (bivalve)
- Mos gallicus, an educational approach for law proposed by François Douaren in 1544
- Nicrophorus interruptus, sometimes referred to as Necrophorus Gallicus, a species of burying beetle or sexton beetle of the family Silphidae
- Pachylaelaps gallicus, a species of mites of the genus Pachylaelaps
- Philanthaxoides gallicus, a fossil species of beetles of the family Buprestidae
- Phlaeothrips gallicus, a species of thrips of the genus Phlaeothrips
- Polistes gallicus, a species of paper wasp
- Porcellio gallicus, a species of woodlouse of the genus Porcellio
- Senecio gallicus, a.k.a. French groundsel, an annual plant of the genus Senecio
- Short-toed snake eagle (taxonomic name: Circaetus gallicus), a.k.a. short-toed eagle, a medium-sized bird of prey of the family Accipitridae
- Thaumatogelis gallicus, a species of parasitoid wasps of the genus Thaumatogelis
- Trichius gallicus, a beetle species belonging to the family Scarabaeidae

== Other ==
- Gallicus, a Roman cognomina
- Gallic Hercules or Hercules Gallicus, a renaissance mythography in France
- Murus gallicus or Gallic wall, a method of construction of defensive walls used to protect Iron Age hillforts
- Murus Gallicus (game), an abstract strategy game created in 2009
- Syphilis, sometimes referred to as morbus gallicus ("the French Disease")

== See also ==
- Gallic (disambiguation)
- Gallia (disambiguation), which includes Gallian
