= Cervalces carnutorum =

Cervalces carnutorum Temporal range: Late Pliocene to Early Pleistocene

Scientific classification
- Kingdom: Animalia
- Phylum: Chordata
- Class: Mammalia
- Infraclass: Placentalia
- Order: Artiodactyla
- Family: Cervidae
- Subfamily: Capreolinae
- Genus: †Cervalces
- Species: †C. carnutorum

Binomial name
- †Cervalces carnutorum Laugel, 1862

Extinct species of deer

Cervalces carnutorum, sometimes known as Alces carnutorum, is an extinct species of large deer that lived in Europe during the Early Pleistocene. Fragments were found in the site of Saint-Prest, near Chartres, and described by Laugel in 1862.

The exact position of species within the genera Alces, Cervalces and Libralces is of debate. Many large, prehistoric moose-like cervids were originally placed in Alces, but have since been moved to Cervalces or Libralces by many (but not all) authorities. Both Cervalces and Libralces have also been used interchangeably with regards to certain species.
