= Mammoths, Sabertooths, and Hominids =

2002 book by Jordi Agustí and Mauricio Antón

Mammoths, Sabertooths, and Hominids: 65 Million Years of Mammalian Evolution in Europe
- Author: Jordi Agustí and Mauricio Antón
- Cover artist: Mauricio Antón
- Language: English
- Genre: Reference
- Publisher: Columbia University Press
- Publication date: 2002
- Pages: 328 pp
- ISBN: 0-231-11640-3
- OCLC: 61129178

Mammoths, Sabertooths, and Hominids: 65 Million Years of Mammalian Evolution in Europe is a book written by Jordi Agustí and illustrated by Mauricio Antón. It was first published in 2002 by Columbia University Press.

The book is a journey through 65 million years of palaeontological records, from the extinction of the dinosaurs to just before present. Notwithstanding the title, the book includes the complex evolutionary records of most continents within its pages – thoroughfully described by Agustí and breathtakingly illustrated by Antón.

Agustí and Antón provide a broad overview of the Tertiary history of mammals in Europe: the evolutionary changes within the European fauna as well as the fates of immigrant taxa that arrived from other continents.

== See also ==
- National Geographic Prehistoric Mammals
- BBC's Walking with Beasts
