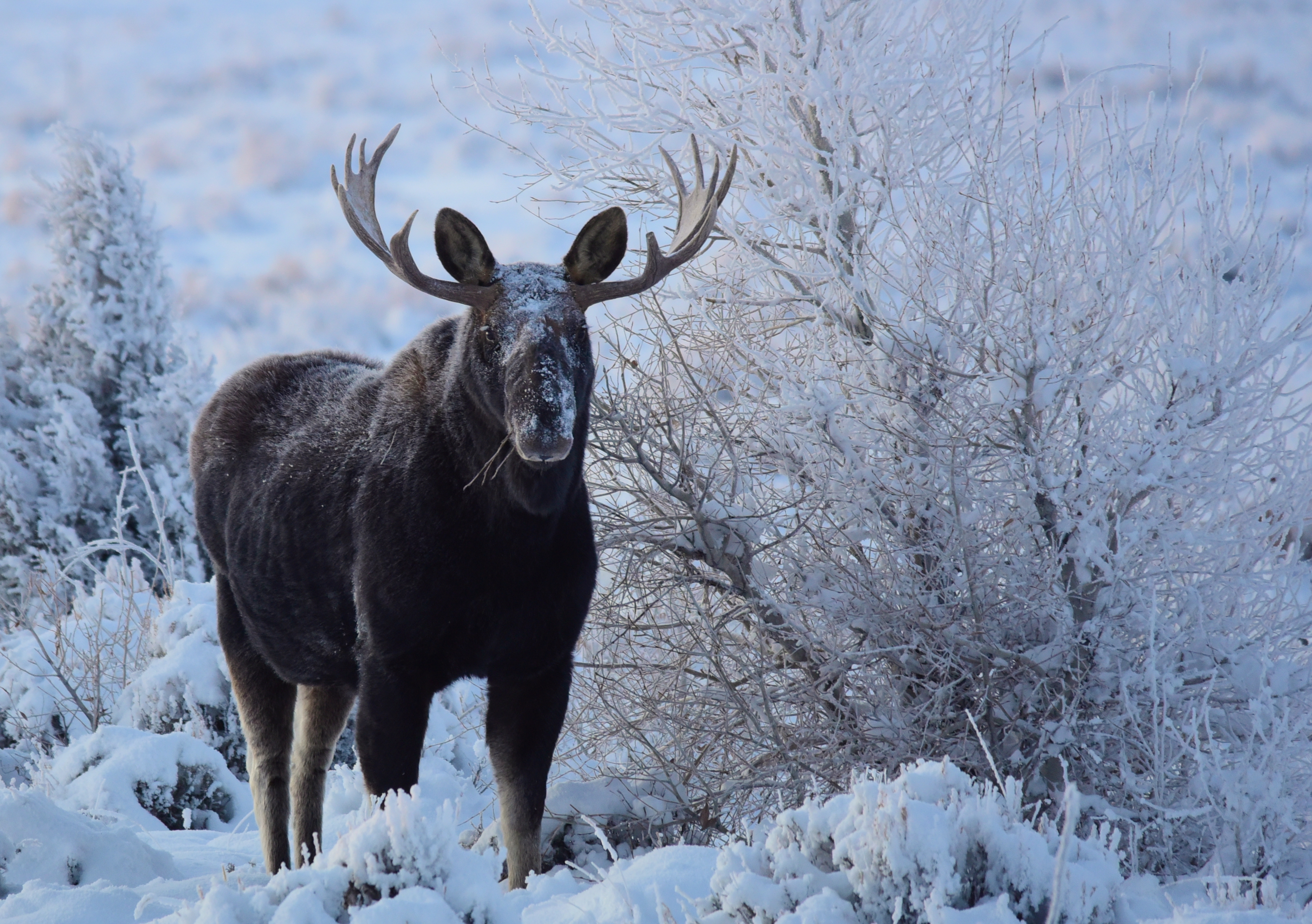
- A bull moose at the Seedskadee National Wildlife Refuge

Scientific classification
- Kingdom: Animalia
- Phylum: Chordata
- Class: Mammalia
- Order: Artiodactyla
- Family: Cervidae
- Subfamily: Capreolinae
- Genus: Alces
- Species: A. alces
- Subspecies: A. a. shirasi

Trinomial name
- Alces alces shirasi (Nelson, 1914)

Synonyms
- Alces americanus shirasi

= Shiras moose =

Shiras moose Temporal range: Late Pleistocene—Holocene

North American subspecies of elk

The Shiras moose (Alces alces shirasi), Wyoming moose or Yellowstone moose is the southernmost subspecies of moose in North America.

== Taxonomy ==
Edward William Nelson proposed the scientific name Alces americanus shirasi for a moose from Snake River, Wyoming, in 1914. He named this subspecies after George Shiras III, who is credited for the discovery of this moose subspecies.

Moose are sometimes divided into two species: the American moose and the European elk. In this taxonomy, Shiras moose are classified into the former species, much like Nelson's classification.

=== Evolution ===
Deer are divided into two subfamilies: the Cervinae and the Capreolinae, whose lineages split at least 13.8 million years ago. Moose fall into the latter group, which includes reindeer and roe deer as well.

Moose are the only extant members of the Alceini. This group includes the extinct Cervalces latifrons, the ancestor of modern moose. Moose, an Old World-derived species, crossed the Bering land bridge approximately 14,000 years ago.

== Description ==
This subspecies is the smallest moose subspecies in North America. In Alberta, Adult males (bulls) typically range from 393–488 kg (868–1,076 lb) and stand about 185–199 cm at the shoulder. Adult females (cows) typically range from 348–441 kg (768–973 lb) and stand about 184–195 cm at the shoulder. This is in accordance with Bergmann's rule, which predicts larger organisms are found throughout more colder regions. The fur colour of Shiras moose is usually deep brown whilst their lower legs are light grey.

== Distribution and habitat ==
Shiras moose are the most southerly distributed of the North American moose. This subspecies is found across the northern Rocky Mountains.

Several records of moose have existed in Colorado: Milton Estes documented shooting a moose amongst a wapiti herd in 1863 at Estes Park. Moose fossils have been found in Jurgens Site and Mesa Verde National Park. A recent study has indicated that Moose are native to Colorado and have historically bred in the state. Despite this new research, Colorado Parks and Wildlife and the National Park Service maintain that even though transient moose have roamed Colorado, they have never established a breeding population. In 1978, 24 moose from Utah and Wyoming were reintroduced to Colorado.
