= C. filum =

C. filum may refer to:

- Calameuta filum, a species of sawfly in the genus Calameuta
- Calamobius filum, a species of longhorn beetle
- Carpelimus filum, a species of rove beetle in the genus Carpelimus
- Cephaloziella filum, a species of liverwort in the genus Cephaloziella
- Chondrostethus filum, a species of phasmid in the family Lonchodidae
- Chorda filum, a species of brown algae
- Cisurgus filum, a species of bark beetle in the subfamily Scolytinae
- Cormopus filum, a species of weevil in the family Brentidae
- Corticeus filum, a species of darkling beetle in the genus Corticeus
- Cylindromorphus filum, a species of jewel beetle in the genus Cylindromorphus
- Crypturgus filum, a species of bark beetle in the genus Crypturgus
