= National Geographic Prehistoric Mammals =

- Author: Alan Turner
- Language: English
- Genre: Reference
- Publisher: National Geographic
- Publication date: 2004
- Pages: 192 pp
- ISBN: 0-7922-7134-3
- OCLC: 54079923
- Dewey Decimal: 569 22
- LC Class: QE881 .T87 2004

National Geographic Prehistoric Mammals is a book by Alan Turner and illustrated by Mauricio Anton. It was published in 2004 by National Geographic.
