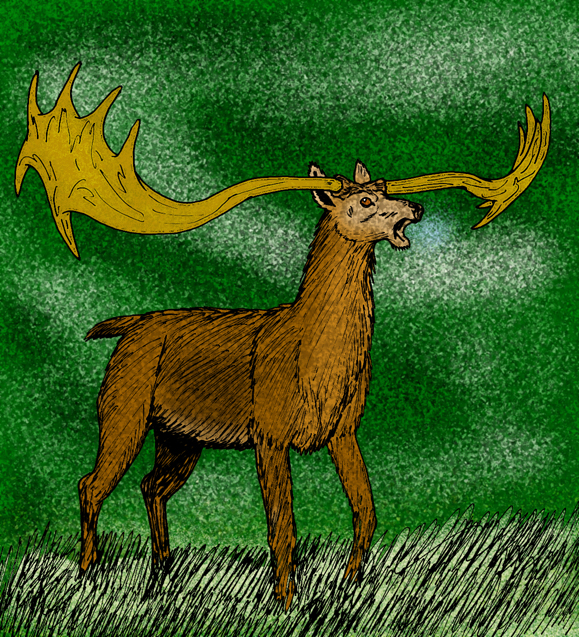
- Libralces gallicus

Scientific classification
- Kingdom: Animalia
- Phylum: Chordata
- Class: Mammalia
- Order: Artiodactyla
- Family: Cervidae
- Subfamily: Capreolinae
- Tribe: Alceini
- Genus: †Libralces; Azzaroli 1952

Species
- †L. gallicus; †L. minor; †L. reynoldsi

= Libralces =

Libralces Temporal range: 5.330–0.781 Ma Pliocene-Pleistocene

Extinct genus of deer

Libralces was a dubious genus of Eurasian deer that lived during the Pliocene epoch. It is notable for its 2+ meter wide antlers, comparable in size to those of Megaloceros.

Libralces fossils have been found from France to Tajikistan, with the best-known examples being the French L. gallicus.

According to Jordi Agustí, Libralces was the ancestor of Megaloceros, though most other authorities regard it as a relative of moose, Alces.

In the Pleistocene, there were three genera of Holarctic moose-like deer — Cervalces, Alces, and Libralces. In contrast to modern Alces, the Villafranchian Libralces gallicus had very long-beamed, small-palmed antlers and a generalized skull with moderately reduced nasals; the Nearctic Cervalces had longer nasals and more complex antlers than Libralces. Azzaroli 1953 added Alces latiforns to Libralces, but this position has been challenged. L. latifrons is now considered a synonym of Cervalces latifrons.

== Gallery ==
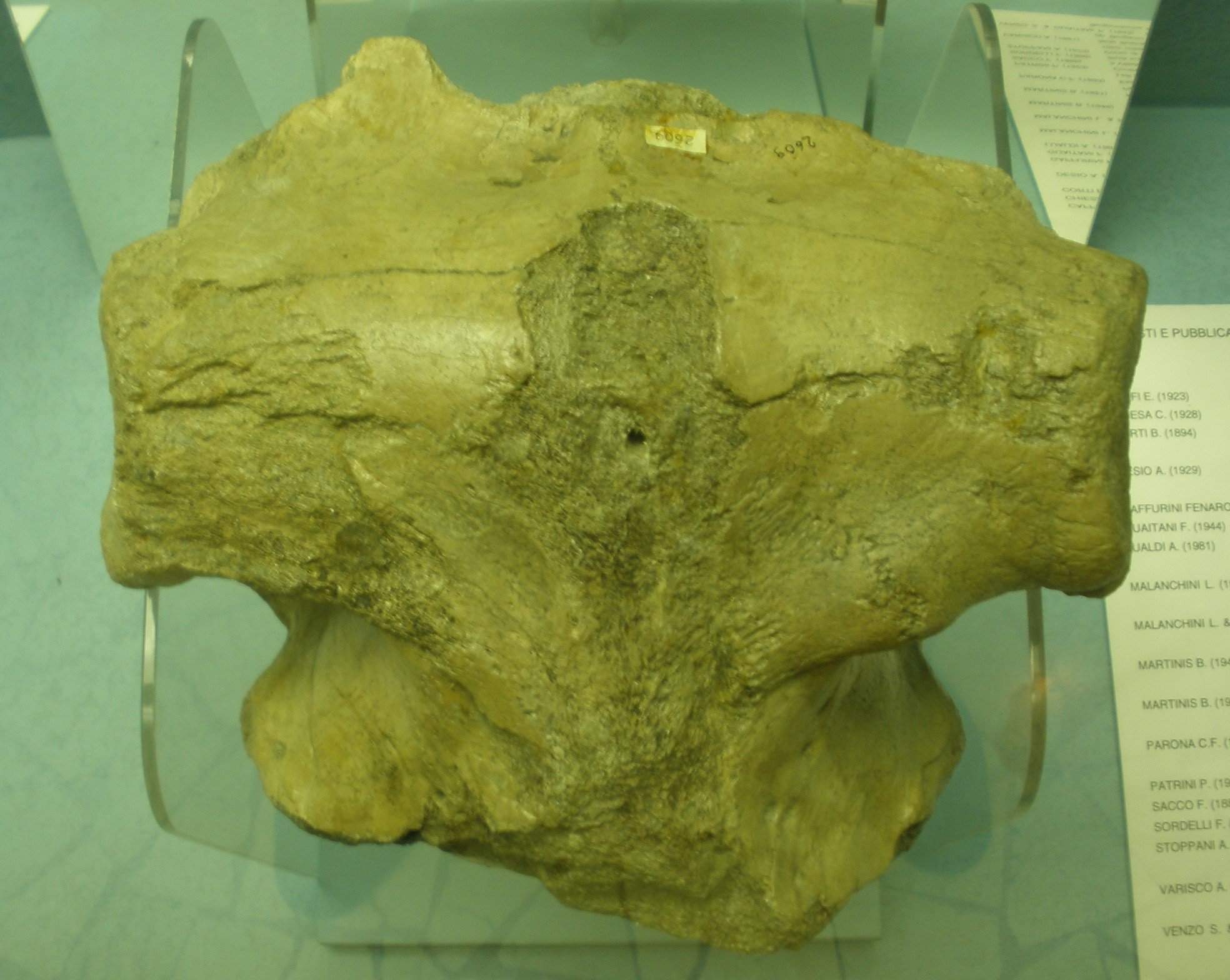
Partial skull of Libralces latifrons
