= Mauricio Antón =

Spanish artist and paleontologist

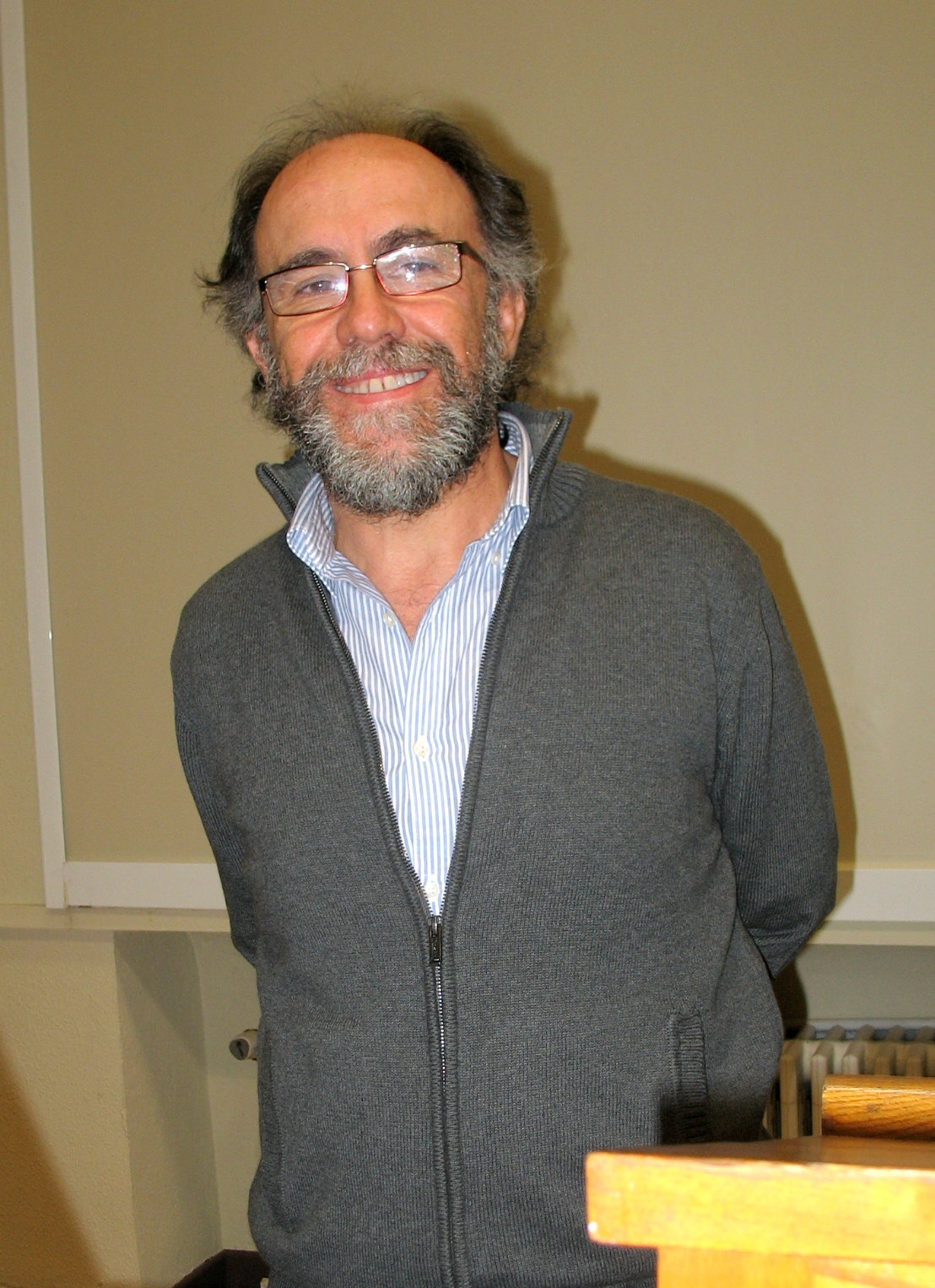
- Born: 1961; Bilbao, Spain
- Scientific career
- Fields: paleoart vertebrate paleontology
- Website: https://mauricioanton.wordpress.com

Mauricio Antón Ortuzar (born 1961 in Bilbao, Spain) is a Spanish paleoartist, vertebrate paleontologist, and illustrator. As a paleontologist specialising in carnivoran mammals, he has written extensively about sabertooth cats, as well as other groups like hyenas and amphicyonids. As a paleoartist and illustrator, he has created numerous illustrations of prehistoric life illustrating carnivorans as well as other animals (typically mammals), and archaic humans. Antón is one of the most widely known and influential contemporary paleoartists.

== Life and career ==
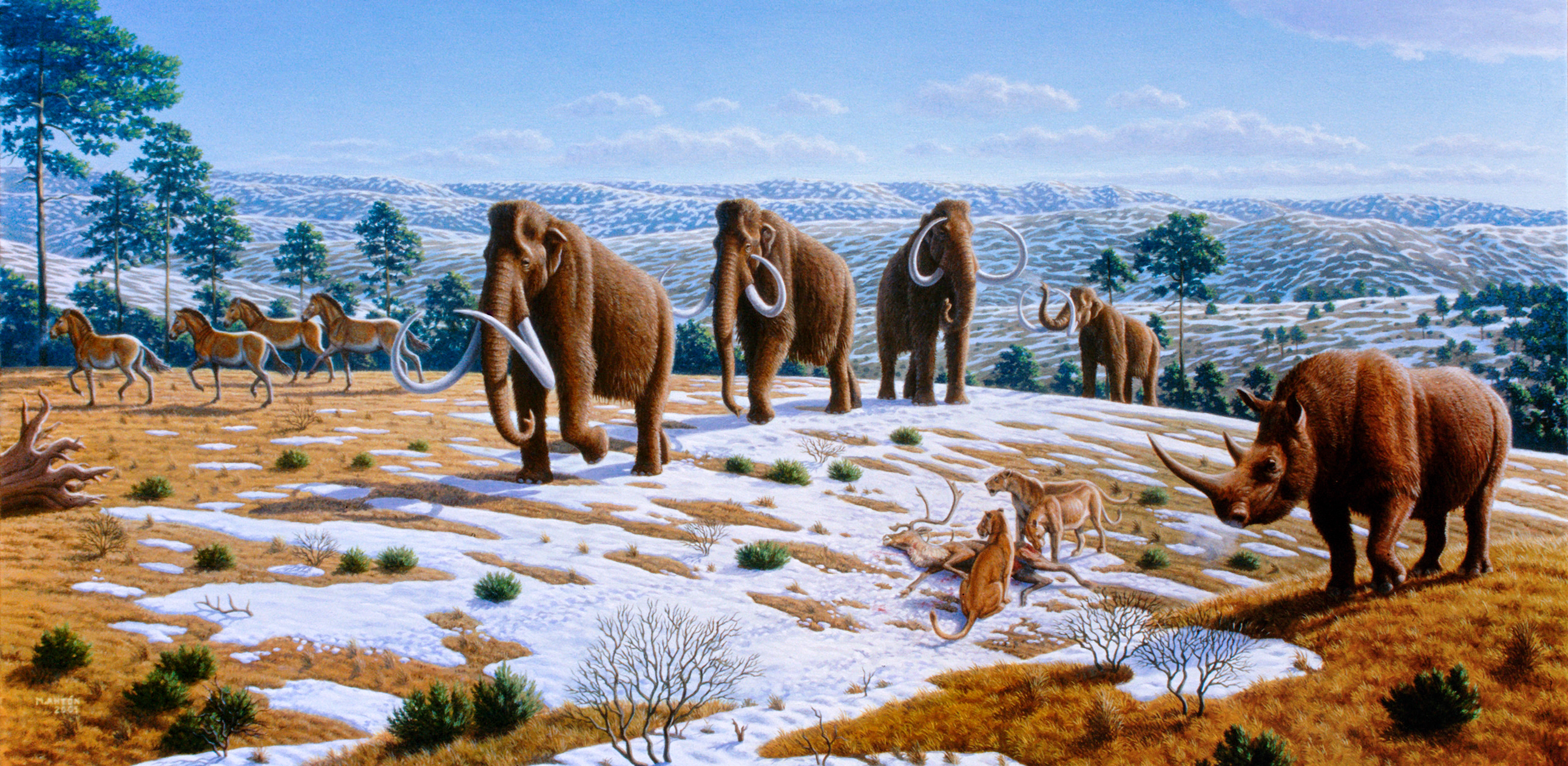
Northern Spain during the ice age by Mauricio Antón, 2008

Anton was born in Bilbao, Spain. His family moved to Venezuela in the 1970s. As a teenager in Caracas, Antón became fascinated with the skeleton of the saber-tooth cat Smilodon fatalis on exhibition at the local museum. Ever since, he has been working and improving his techniques to bring fossils alive, being especially interested in felids, hominids and other vertebrates. As he puts it in one of his books (El secreto de los fósiles) “It is the responsibility of the scientific paleo-illustrator to make sure that his images rigorously transmit the knowledge that the paleontologists have gathered from specific extinct species.”

To do this he gathers data from extant species, travelling the world extensively, working hands on with fossils, dissecting specimens donated by zoos, researching extinct species with specialists and using extant ecosystems as a basis for the reconstruction of past ones. He has been an advisor on paleobiology, biomechanics, animal locomotion, and habitats of extinct vertebrates for various media (BBC, National Geographic Society, Natural History, Discovery Channel, etc.). He has benefited from the influences of paleoart masters such as Charles R. Knight, Rudolph Zallinger, Zdenek Burian, Jay Matternes and others from whom he not only recognizes the technological advances but also the conceptual progress they made.

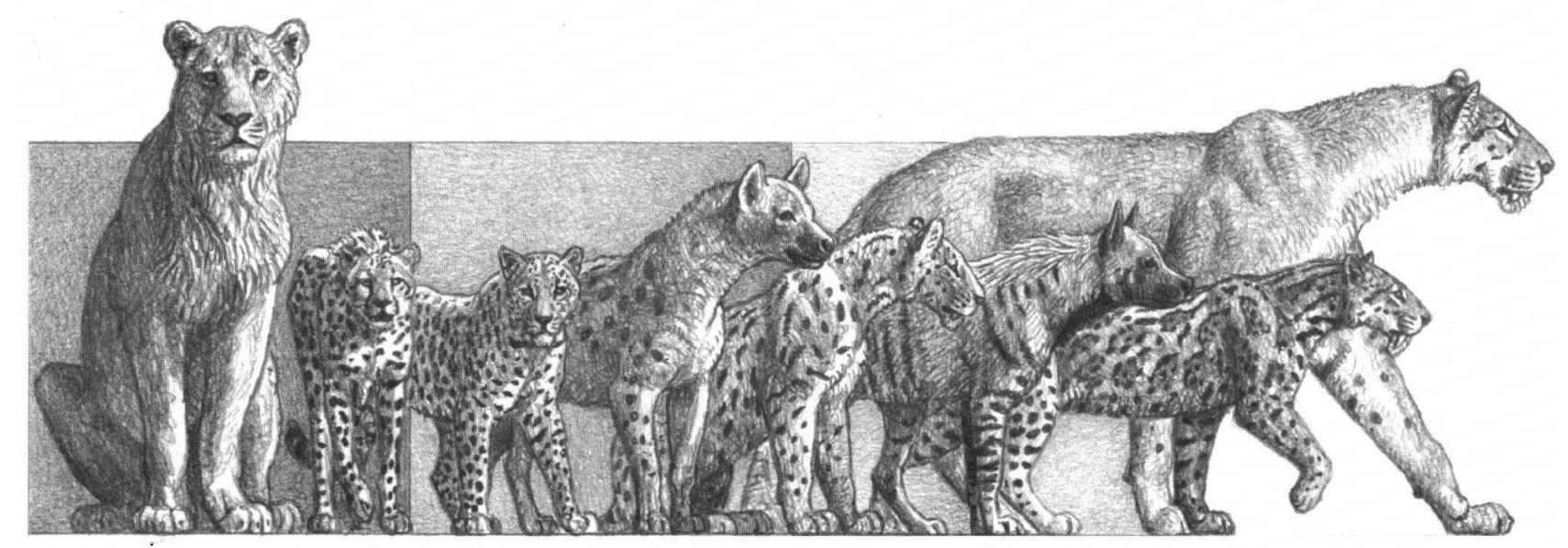
Pliocene African carnivorans

Since 2004, he has been working in collaboration with "The Fly Factory" animation studios in the application of 3D modeling and animation to the reconstruction of past life. In 2006, he won the Lanzendorf PaleoArt Prize for the best scientific illustration from the SVP (Society of Vertebrate Paleontology). In 2009, he was invited by the Chinese Institute of Vertebrate Paleontology and Paleoanthropology to visit their Beijing Museum and also the new Museum and fossil sites at Hezheng in central China, where he made first-hand observations of undescribed carnivore fossils. A museum he contributed major illustrations to in Bolnisi, Georgia, was nominated for the European Museum Awards in 2022.

Between 2009 and 2010 he contributed to the "Extreme Mammals" exposition of the American Museum of Natural History, New York.

In recent years, Antón is leading art safaris to Northern Botswana under the title "Drawing the Big Cats", sharing first-hand sightings and his experience in studying the anatomy and evolution of felids with artists from all around the world.

== Publications ==
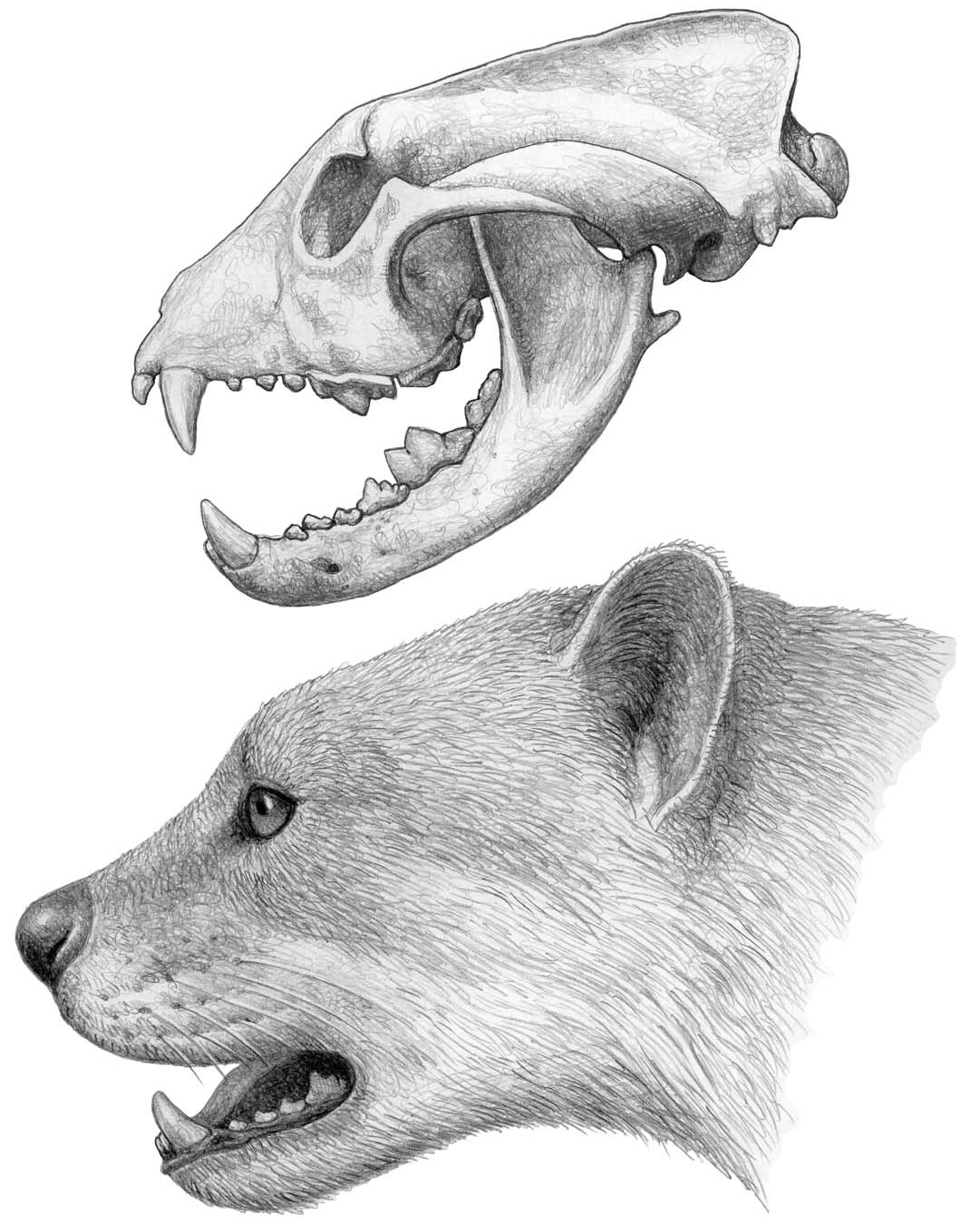
Skull and head of Simocyon, 2005

Among his most well known books are:

- Sabertooth. Text and illustrations by Mauricio Anton. Indiana University Press, Bloomington 2013.
- La Gran Migración. Jordi Agustí y Mauricio Antón. Crítica, Barcelona, 2011.
- Madrid antes del hombre. Mauricio Antón y Jorge Morales, Coordinadores. Comunidad de Madrid, 2009.
- Dogs, their fossil relatives and evolutionary history. Xiaoming Wang, Richard Tedford and Mauricio Anton. Columbia University Press New York 2008.
- Antón, Mauricio (2007) El secreto de los fósiles. Aguilar.
- Turner, Alan y Antón, Mauricio (2004) The National Geographic book of prehistoric mammals. National Geographic. [En español: Larousse de los mamíferos prehistóricos. Spes-Larousse, 2007]
- Turner, Alan y Antón, Mauricio (2004) Evolving Eden. An illustrated guide to the evolution of the African large mammal fauna, Columbia University Press.
- Agustí, Jordi y Antón, Mauricio (2002) Mammoths, Sabertooths and Hominids. 65 million years of mammalian evolution in Europe. Columbia University Press.
- Jordi Agustí y Antón, Mauricio (1997) Memoria de la Tierra. Vertebrados fósiles de la Península Ibérica. Ediciones del Serbal.
- Turner, Alan y Antón, Mauricio (1997) The big cats and their fossil relatives. An illustrated guide to their evolution and natural history. Columbia University Press.
