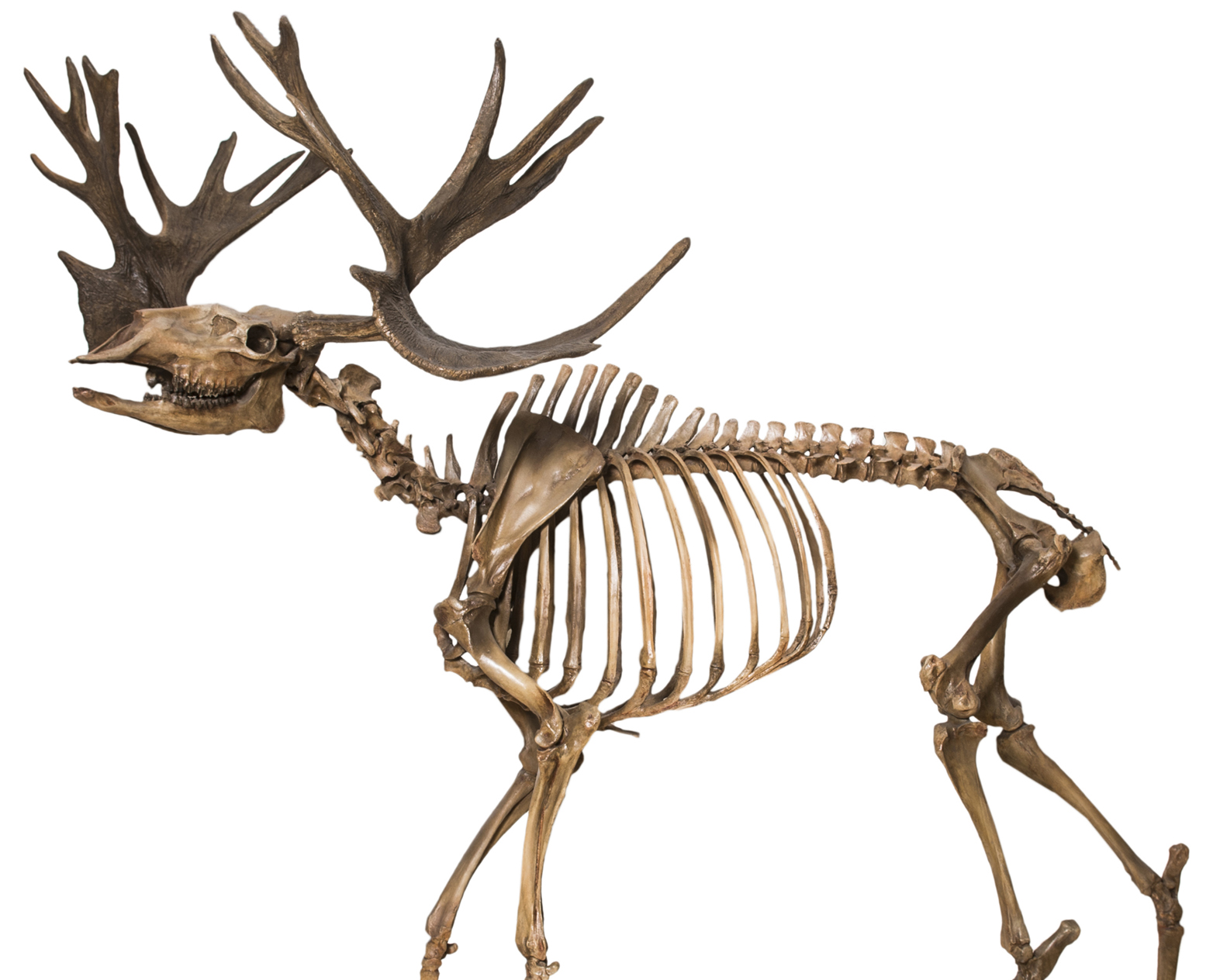
- Replica skeleton at MUSE

Scientific classification
- Kingdom: Animalia
- Phylum: Chordata
- Class: Mammalia
- Order: Artiodactyla
- Family: Cervidae
- Subfamily: Capreolinae
- Genus: †Cervalces
- Species: †C. scotti

Binomial name
- †Cervalces scotti Lydekker, 1898

= Cervalces scotti =

Cervalces scotti Temporal range: Pleistocene–0.011

Extinct species of deer

Cervalces scotti, also known as stag-moose or Scott's moose, is an extinct species of large deer that lived in North America during the Late Pleistocene epoch. It is the only known North American member of the genus Cervalces. Its closest living relative is the modern moose (Alces alces).

It had palmate antlers that were more complex than those of a moose and a muzzle more closely resembling that of a typical deer.

== Description ==
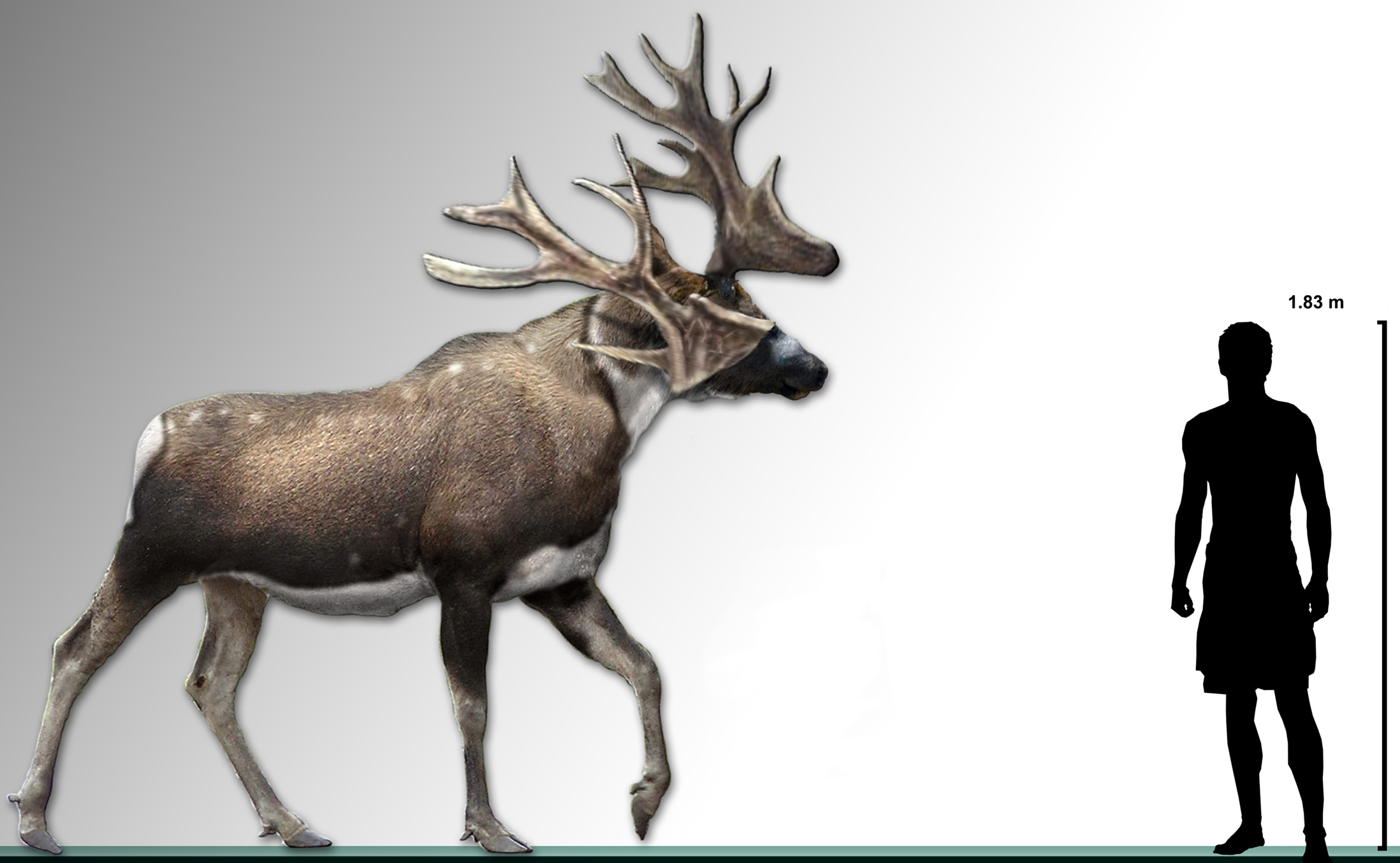
Cervalces scotti size chart.

It was as large as the modern moose, with an elk-like head, long legs, and palmate antlers that were more complex and heavily branching than the moose. Cervalces scotti reached 2.5 m (8.2 ft) in length and a weight of 708.5 kg (1,562 lb). The stag-moose resided in North America during an era with other megafauna such as the woolly mammoth, ground sloth, long horn bison, and smilodon. The species became extinct approximately 11,500 years ago, toward the end of the most recent ice age, as part of a mass extinction of large North American mammals.

The first evidence of Cervalces scotti found in modern times was discovered at Big Bone Lick, Kentucky by William Clark, circa 1805. A more complete skeleton was found in 1885 by William Barryman Scott in New Jersey. Mummified remains have also been found. One of the most complete Cervalces skulls ever discovered was dredged from a pond in Kendallville, Indiana and dated to 13,500 BP.

== Extinction ==
Cervalces scotti, like several other members of its genus, probably lived in marshes, swamps and bogs, as well as spruce-taiga floral communities. There were also surroundings ranging from tundra–mixed coniferous forests to deciduous woodlands. These sedges and willows may not have been suitable food products, but they provide an imagery of the ecology of the stag-moose. The change in flora and fauna due to complete deglaciation probably also affected the living conditions of the stag-moose in states like Iowa and Wisconsin, where the stag-moose was found at more than 20 sites. The stag-moose reproduced more often than megaherbivores, and so the hypothesis is that the stag-moose's disappearance is linked to the emergence of the "true moose" instead.

== Palaeobiology ==
Cervalces scotti is thought to have evolved from a population of Cervalces latifrons that migrated into North America probably sometime during the Middle Pleistocene. It shared the spruce parkland ecosystem with other herbivorous megafauna, such as the caribou (Rangifer tarandus), the woodland musk-ox (Bootherium bombifrons), and the giant beaver (Castoroides sp.), in a range from what is now southern Canada to Arkansas and from Iowa to New Jersey. As the glaciers retreated, moose (which had crossed the Bering land bridge from Asia) may have populated the habitat of Cervalces scotti and caused its extinction by outcompetition. Although there is no paleontological evidence that it was associated with humans, other theories for its extinction have been proposed. Notably, there is speculation that hunting by newly arrived humans caused the extinction of Cervalces scotti and other large mammals. Additionally, some have proposed a sudden extinction by disease, brought by small mammals in association with humans. The oldest known fossil of Cervalces scotti was found in the bed of the Skunk River in Iowa, with the specimen dating back approximately 30,000 years ago. The area in which the fossil was found and the date implies that Cervalces scotti lived before a massive ice sheet covered the area in which it inhabited, which could also be a possible cause of its extinction. Since the stag-moose resided in a woodland habitat, climate change and loss of natural pastures also could have played a role in its extinction.

Cervalces scotti probably lived in a narrow geographic range, characterized by a spruce-dominant mixed conifer and deciduous wet woodland which may have made it more vulnerable to extinction. Remains of Cervalces scotti found in modern-day Ohio have suggested that it and Homo sapiens could have possibly interacted. Fossils of both Cervalces scotti and other large extinct mammals in the area suggest that it may have been a frequent target of early human hunters. Remains of the stag moose, along with Paleo Indian artifacts and the remains of the flat-headed peccary (Platygonus compressus), giant short-faced bear (Arctodus simus), and giant beaver were found in the Sheriden Cave in Wyandot County, Ohio.
