= Phlaeothrips =

Scientific classification
- Kingdom: Animalia
- Phylum: Arthropoda
- Class: Insecta
- Order: Thysanoptera
- Family: Phlaeothripidae
- Genus: Phlaeothrips; Haliday, 1836

Genus of thrips

Phlaeothrips is a genus of thrips in the family Phlaeothripidae.

== Species ==
- Phlaeothrips amphicinctus
- Phlaeothrips amplicincta
- Phlaeothrips anacardii
- Phlaeothrips annulicornis
- Phlaeothrips annulipes
- Phlaeothrips bacauensis
- Phlaeothrips bispinoides
- Phlaeothrips bispinosus
- Phlaeothrips coriaceus
- Phlaeothrips denticauda
- Phlaeothrips gallicus
- Phlaeothrips glabrigenis
- Phlaeothrips guriensis
- Phlaeothrips mauiensis
- Phlaeothrips minor
- Phlaeothrips nilgiricus
- Phlaeothrips pillichianus
- Phlaeothrips poecilus
- †Phlaeothrips schlechtendali
- Phlaeothrips spurius
- Phlaeothrips subglaber
- Phlaeothrips sycomori
- Phlaeothrips tristis
- Phlaeothrips varius
