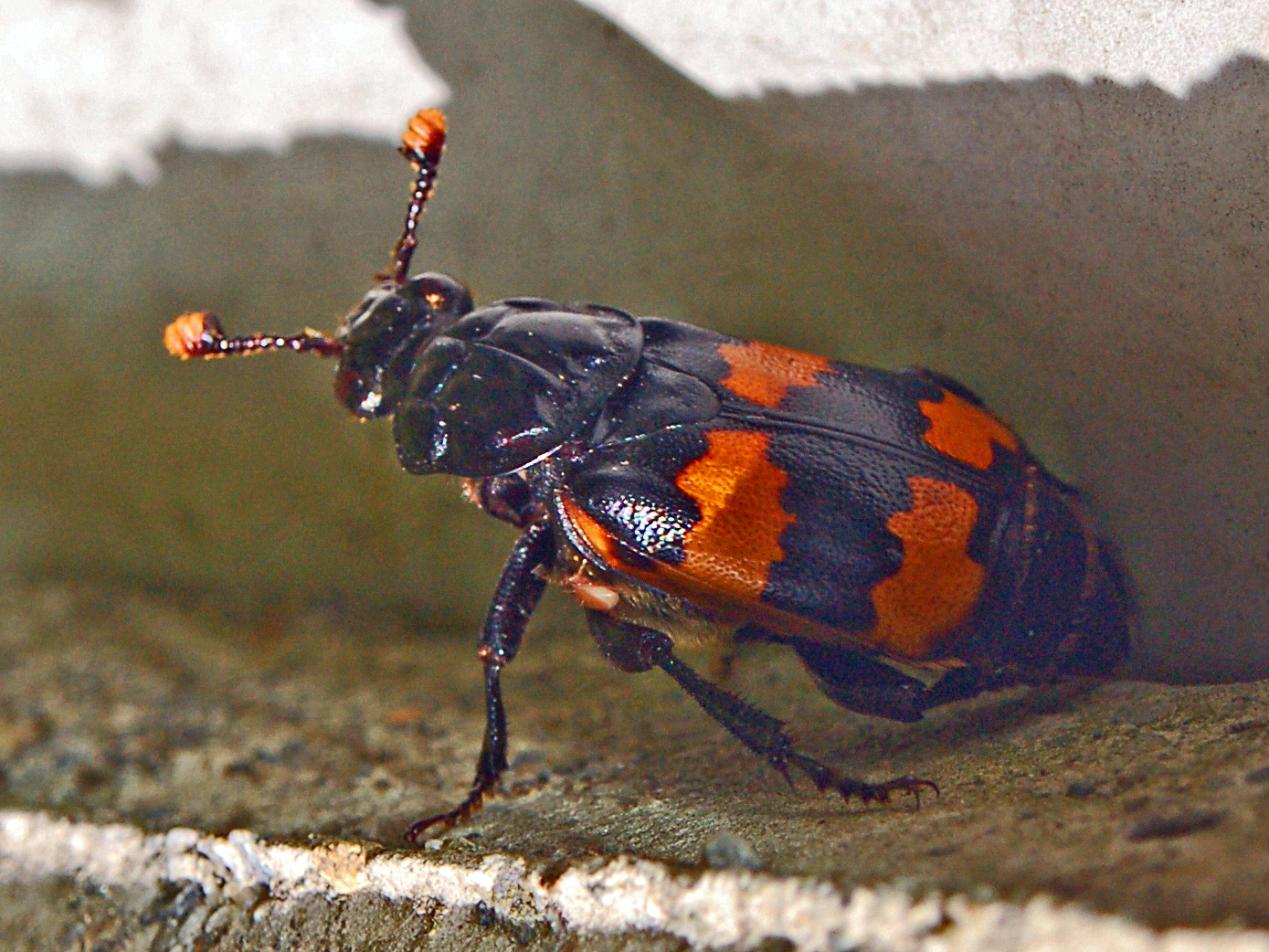

Scientific classification
- Kingdom: Animalia
- Phylum: Arthropoda
- Clade: Pancrustacea
- Class: Insecta
- Order: Coleoptera
- Suborder: Polyphaga
- Infraorder: Staphyliniformia
- Family: Staphylinidae
- Genus: Nicrophorus
- Species: N. interruptus

Binomial name
- Nicrophorus interruptus Stephens, 1830

Synonyms
- List: Necrophorus interruptus Stephens, 1830; Necrophorus [sic] Corsicus Laporte, 1832; Necrophorus [sic] fossor Erichson, 1837; Necrophorus [sic] funereus Géné, 1839; Necrophorus [sic] basalis Gistel, 1848; Necrophorus [sic] Gallicus Jacquelin du Val, 1860; Necrophorus [sic] suturalis Motschulsky, 1860; Necrophorus [sic] interruptus v. trimaculatus Gradl, 1882; Necrophorus [sic] interruptus v. brunnipes Gradl, 1882; Necrophorus [sic] interruptus v. centrimaculatus Reitter, 1895; Necrophorus [sic] interruptus var./ab trinotatus Reitter, 1911; Necrophorus [sic] interruptus v. nigricans Pasquet, 1916; Necrophorus [sic] interruptus v. algiricus Pasquet, 1916; Necrophorus [sic] interruptus v. pasqueti Pic, 1917; Necrophorus [sic] fossor infuscaticornis Portevin, 1924

= Nicrophorus interruptus =

Species of beetle

Nicrophorus interruptus is a species of burying beetle or sexton beetle belonging to the family Silphidae subfamily Nicrophorinae.

== Distribution ==
Nicrophorus interruptus is the rarest but widespread among the large red and black carrion beetles. They are present in most of Europe, in the eastern Palearctic realm, in the Near East and in North Africa.

== Description ==
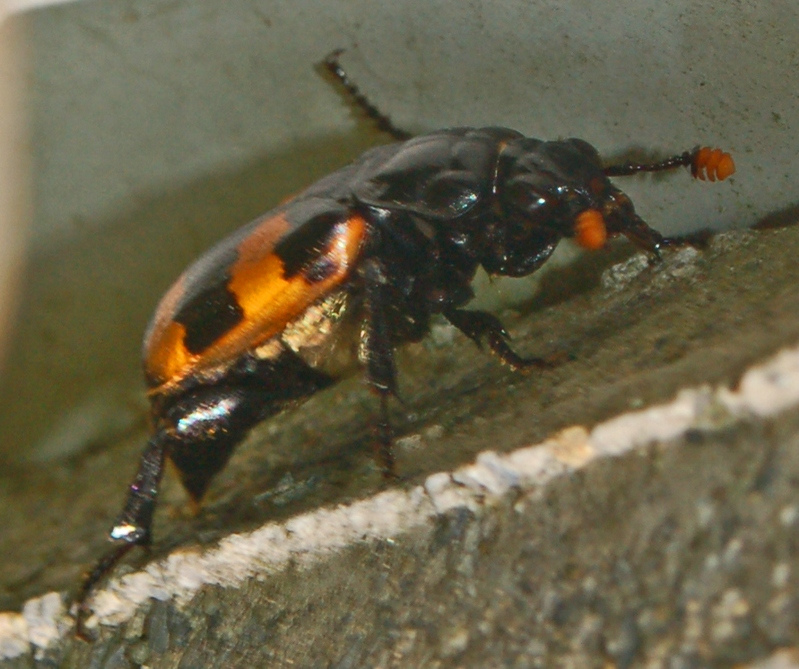
Lateral view

The adults grow up to 26 millimetres (1.0 in) long. They are mostly black with two orange-red markings on the elytra and a yellow pubescence on protruding abdominal segments. They are also characterized by the absence of hairs on the thorax and straight tibias on the hind legs.

The front and posterior orange-red markings on the elytra are separated from one another at the suture. They have large club-like antennae equipped with black and reddish tips containing chemoreceptors, capable of detecting a dead animal from a long way away.

== Biology ==
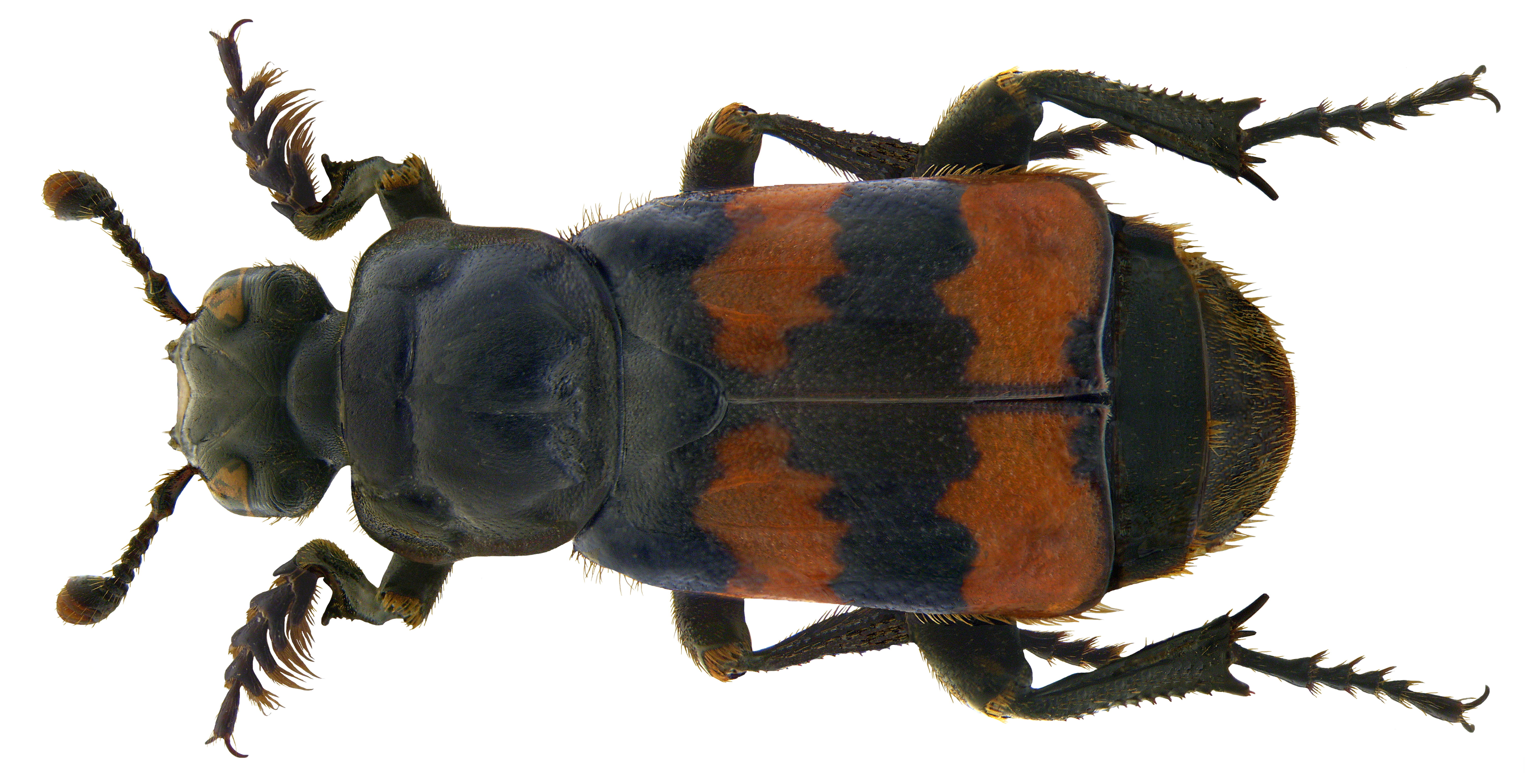
Nicrophorus interruptus, male. Mounted specimen

These beetles are scavengers, breeding and living off in rotten carcases. In fact they bury the carcasses of small vertebrates such as birds and mice as a food source for their larvae.

In Nicrophorus interruptus both the male and female parents take care of the brood, quite rare behaviour among insects. The prospective parents begin to dig a hole below the carcass, forming the crypt, where the carcass will remain until the flesh has been completely consumed. Although the larvae are able to feed themselves, both parents also feed them by regurgitated liquid food.

The adult beetles continue to protect the larvae, which take several days to mature. The final-stage larvae migrate into the soil and pupate, transforming from small white larvae to fully formed adult beetles.

== Bibliography ==
- Derek S. Sikes, Ronald B. Madge & Alfred F. Newton (2002): A Catalog of the Nicrophorinae (Coleoptera : Silphidae) of the World, Magnolia Press
- Jessica Dekeirsschieter, François Verheggen, Georges Lognay, Eric Haubruge Large carrion beetles (Coleoptera, Silphidae) in Western Europe: a review
