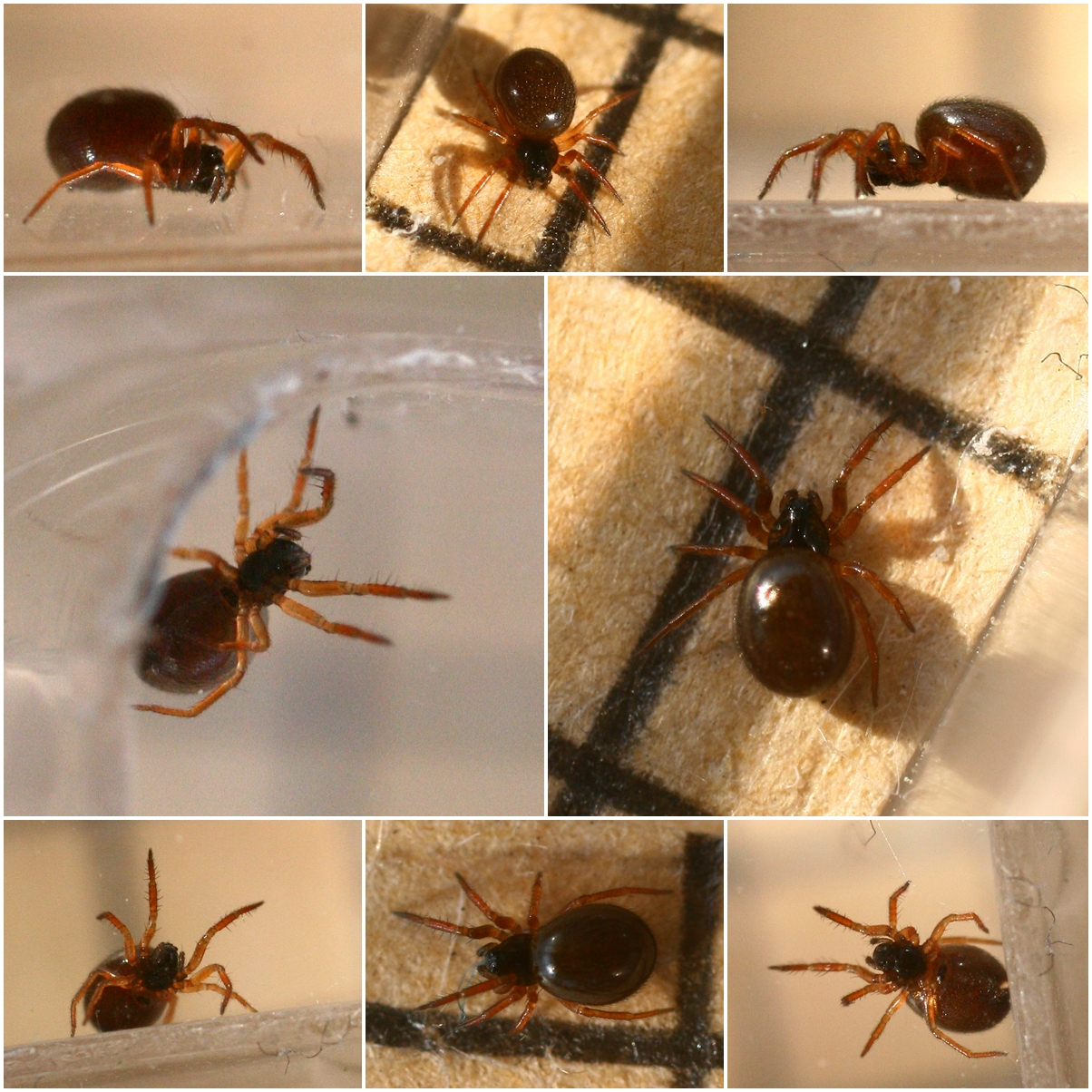
- M sundevalli

Scientific classification
- Kingdom: Animalia
- Phylum: Arthropoda
- Subphylum: Chelicerata
- Class: Arachnida
- Order: Araneae
- Infraorder: Araneomorphae
- Family: Linyphiidae
- Genus: Maso; Simon, 1884

Type species
- M. sundevalli (Westring, 1851)

Species
- 7, see text

= Maso (spider) =

Genus of spiders

Maso is a genus of dwarf spiders that was first described by Eugène Louis Simon in 1884.

== Species ==
As of May 2019 it contains seven species:

- Maso alticeps (Emerton, 1909) – USA
- Maso douro Bosmans & Cardoso, 2010 – Portugal
- Maso gallicus Simon, 1894 – Europe, Algeria to Azerbaijan
- Maso krakatauensis Bristowe, 1931 – Indonesia (Krakatau)
- Maso navajo Chamberlin, 1949 – USA
- Maso politus Banks, 1896 – USA
- Maso sundevalli (Westring, 1851) (type) – North America, Europe, Turkey, Caucasus, Russia (Europe to Far East), China, Mongolia, Japan

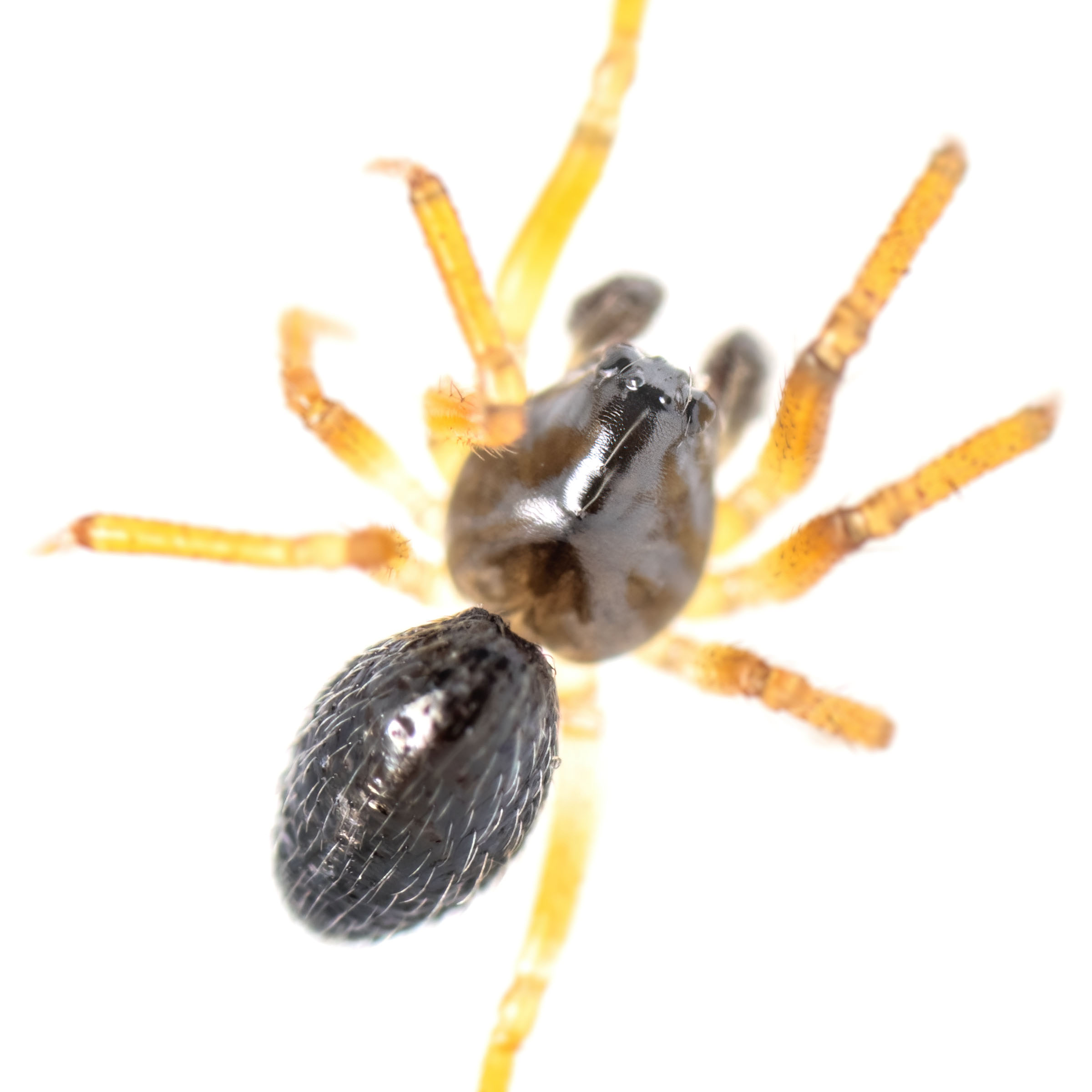
Male spider of species Maso sundevalli, seen from top.
