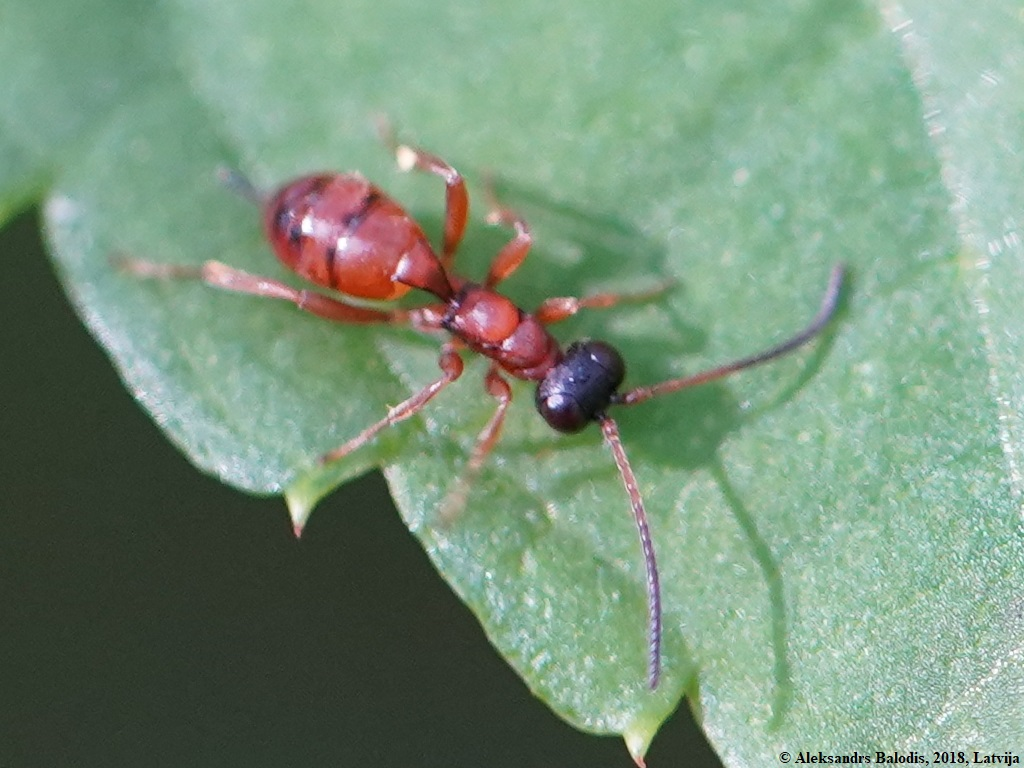
- Thaumatogelis audax

Scientific classification
- Domain: Eukaryota
- Kingdom: Animalia
- Phylum: Arthropoda
- Class: Insecta
- Order: Hymenoptera
- Family: Ichneumonidae
- Genus: Thaumatogelis; Schwarz, 1995

= Thaumatogelis =

Genus of insects

Thaumatogelis is a genus of parasitoid wasps belonging to the family Ichneumonidae. The species of this genus are found in Europe.

== Species ==
The following species are recognised in the genus Thaumatogelis:

- Thaumatogelis alecto Vas, 2018
- Thaumatogelis aloiosa Schwarz, 2001
- Thaumatogelis anticecinctus (Strobl, 1901)
- Thaumatogelis asiaticus Schwarz, 2001
- Thaumatogelis audax (Olivier, 1792)
- Thaumatogelis clavatus Schwarz, 2001
- Thaumatogelis femoralis (Brischke, 1881)
- Thaumatogelis fragosus Schwarz, 2001
- Thaumatogelis fuscus (Duchaussoy, 1915)
- Thaumatogelis gallicus (Seyrig, 1928)
- Thaumatogelis improvisus Schwarz, 2001
- Thaumatogelis inexspectatus Schwarz, 2001
- Thaumatogelis innoxius Schwarz, 2001
- Thaumatogelis jonathani Schwarz, 2001
- Thaumatogelis lapidarius (Seyrig, 1926)
- Thaumatogelis lichtensteini (Pfankuch, 1913)
- Thaumatogelis megaera Vas, 2018
- Thaumatogelis mediterraneus (Ceballos, 1925)
- Thaumatogelis mingetshauricus (Bogacev, 1946)
- Thaumatogelis neesii (Forster, 1850)
- Thaumatogelis nuani Schwarz, 2001
- Thaumatogelis numidicus (Thomson, 1885)
- Thaumatogelis pallens Schwarz, 2001
- Thaumatogelis pilosus (Capron, 1888)
- Thaumatogelis rhodensis Schwarz, 2001
- Thaumatogelis robustus (Seyrig, 1926)
- Thaumatogelis rufipes (Strobl, 1901)
- Thaumatogelis rufus (Pfankuch, 1914)
- Thaumatogelis santschii (Duchaussoy, 1915)
- Thaumatogelis sardous Schwarz, 2001
- Thaumatogelis sylvicola (Forster, 1850)
- Thaumatogelis tisiphone Vas & Schwarz, 2018
- Thaumatogelis vulpinus (Gravenhorst, 1815)
