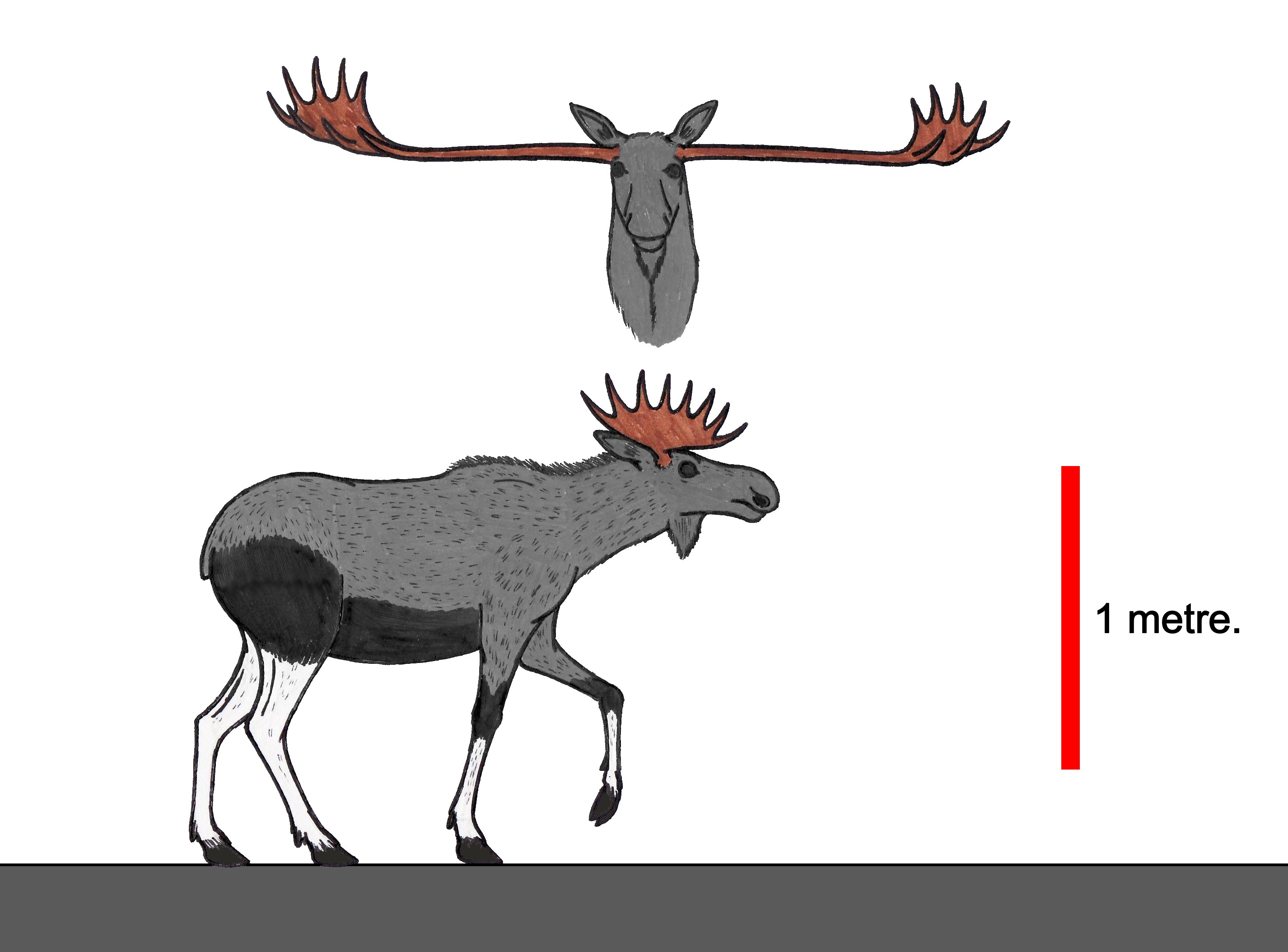
- Size diagram of the extinct elk Alces gallicus

Scientific classification
- Kingdom: Animalia
- Phylum: Chordata
- Class: Mammalia
- Order: Artiodactyla
- Family: Cervidae
- Subfamily: Capreolinae
- Genus: Alces
- Species: †A. gallicus

Binomial name
- †Alces gallicus (Azzaroli, 1952)

Synonyms
- Cervalces gallicus Libralces gallicus

= Alces gallicus =

Alces gallicus Temporal range: 2 Ma

Extinct species of moose

Alces gallicus, also known as the Villafranchian elk, weighing scale elk (from the antlers looking like a pair of scales), or Gallic moose, is an extinct species of Alces, which has been found in Europe. It lived in the Pleistocene, about 2 million years ago. This species was smaller than recent elk or moose, but it had longer antlers than its modern relatives. The antler structure was similar to Cervalces, consisting of very long beams and relatively small palms; it is included in that genus by some authors. It is also sometimes included in the genus Libralces.
