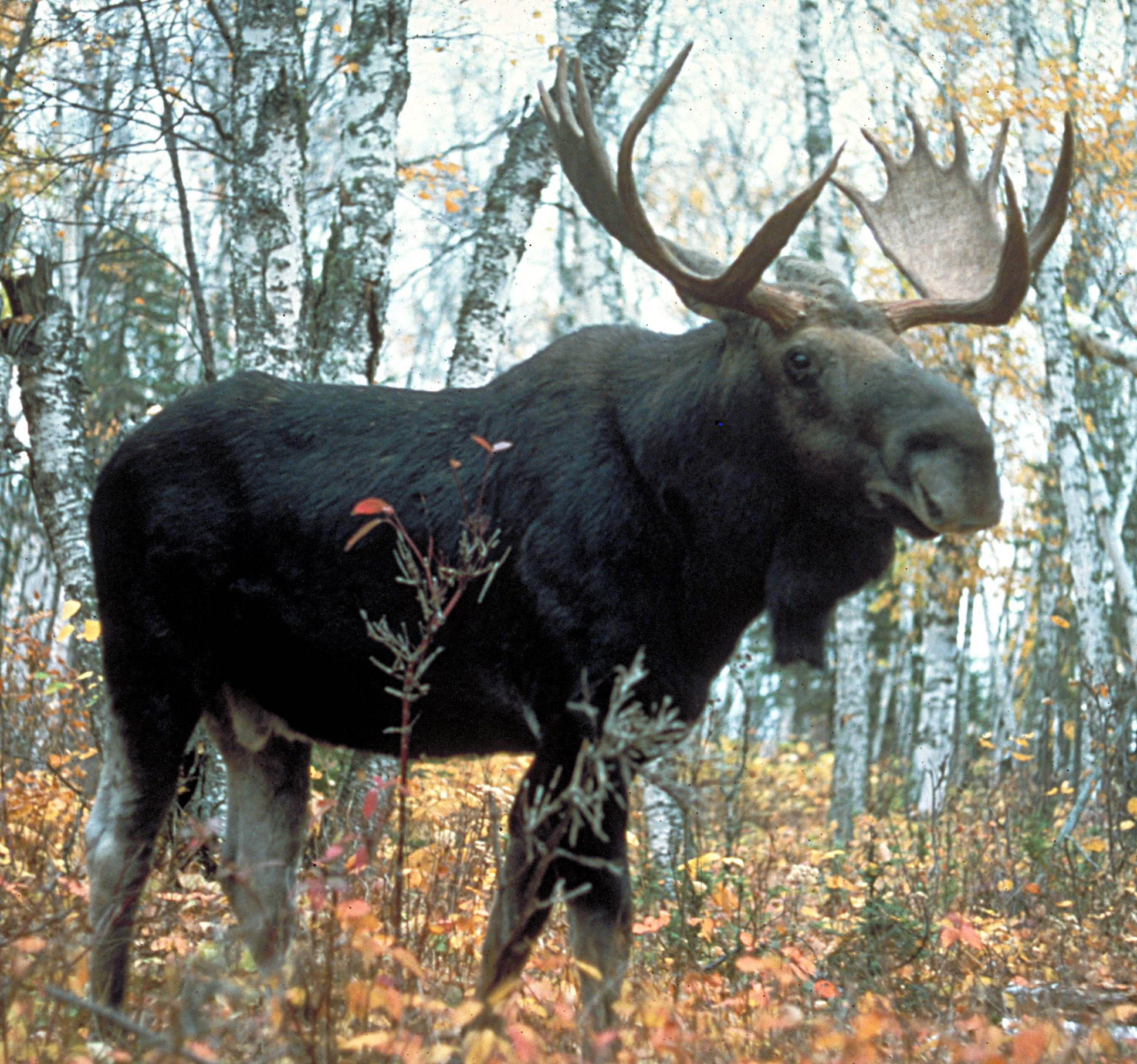
- Alces alces

Scientific classification
- Domain: Eukaryota
- Kingdom: Animalia
- Phylum: Chordata
- Class: Mammalia
- Order: Artiodactyla
- Family: Cervidae
- Subfamily: Capreolinae
- Tribe: Alceini

Genera
- Alces; †Cervalces; †Libralces

= Alceini =

Tribe of deer

Alceini is a tribe of deer, containing the extant genus Alces and the extinct genera Cervalces and Libralces. The only extant species in this tribe is the moose.

== Genera and species ==
- Extant genera
  - Alces
- Extinct genera
  - †Cervalces
  - †Libralces
  - † Cervus sivalensis?
