= Corticeus =

Scientific classification
- Domain: Eukaryota
- Kingdom: Animalia
- Phylum: Arthropoda
- Class: Insecta
- Order: Coleoptera
- Suborder: Polyphaga
- Infraorder: Cucujiformia
- Family: Tenebrionidae
- Genus: Corticeus; Piller & Mitterpacher, 1783

Genus of beetles

Corticeus is a genus of beetles belonging to the family Tenebrionidae.

Synonyms:

- Paraphloeus Seidlitz in Erichson, 1894
- Stenophloeus Blair, 1911
- Syncolydium Kolbe, 1897

Species:

- Corticeus australis (Champion, 1894)
- Corticeus cylindricus (Reitter, 1877)
- Corticeus hackeri (Carter, 1928)
- Corticeus sumatrensis (Pic, 1914)
