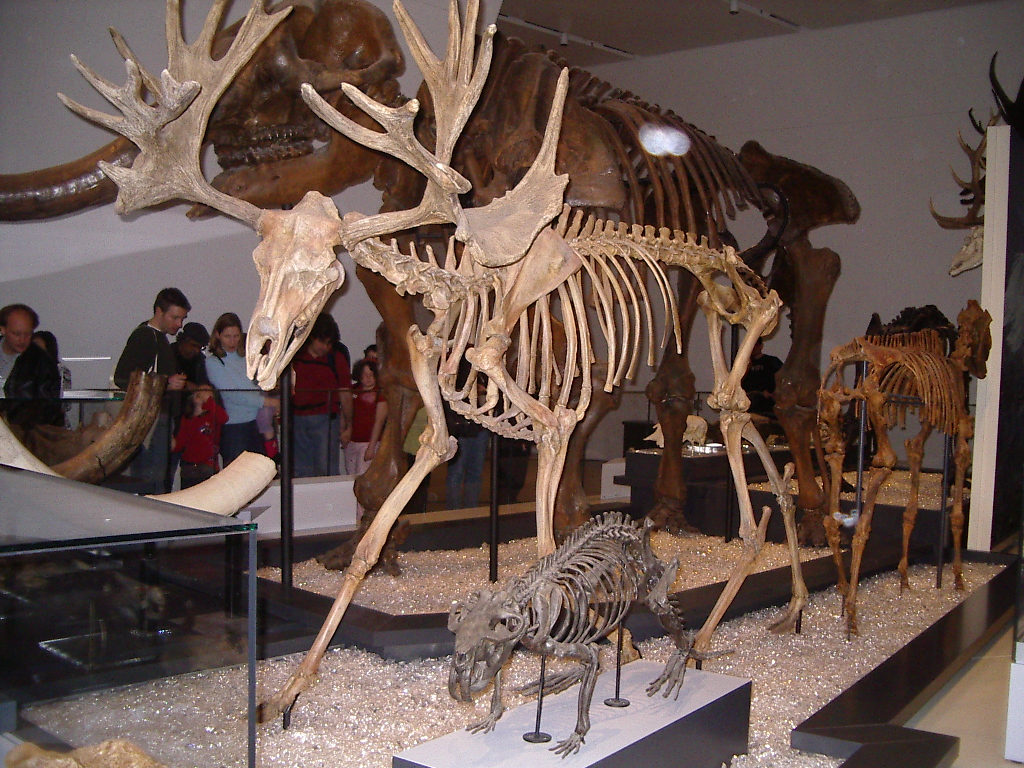
- The stag-moose, Cervalces scotti

Scientific classification
- Kingdom: Animalia
- Phylum: Chordata
- Class: Mammalia
- Order: Artiodactyla
- Family: Cervidae
- Subfamily: Capreolinae
- Tribe: Alceini
- Genus: †Cervalces; Scott, 1885

Species
- C. gallicus?; C. carnutorum; C. scotti; C. latifrons

Synonyms
- Alces

= Cervalces =

Cervalces Temporal range: Pliocene-Pleistocene

Extinct genus of deer

Cervalces is an extinct deer genus that lived during the Pliocene and Pleistocene epochs. It lived in Europe and North America. The genus has been suggested to be paraphyletic and ancestral with respect to Alces, the genus which contains the modern moose, and as such, some authors synonymise Cervalces with Alces.

== Taxonomy ==
Cervalces scotti, the stag-moose, lived in Pleistocene North America. Cervalces latifrons, the broad-fronted moose, and Cervalces carnutorum were found in Pleistocene Europe and Asia. A fourth species, Cervalces gallicus, is either classified as a species of the related Libralces, or an ancestral species to other members of Cervalces.

== Characteristics ==
Cervalces is very similar to the modern moose, but can be distinguished by differences in its facial skeleton and antler shape. The antlers are significantly wider in Cervalces than in Alces.
