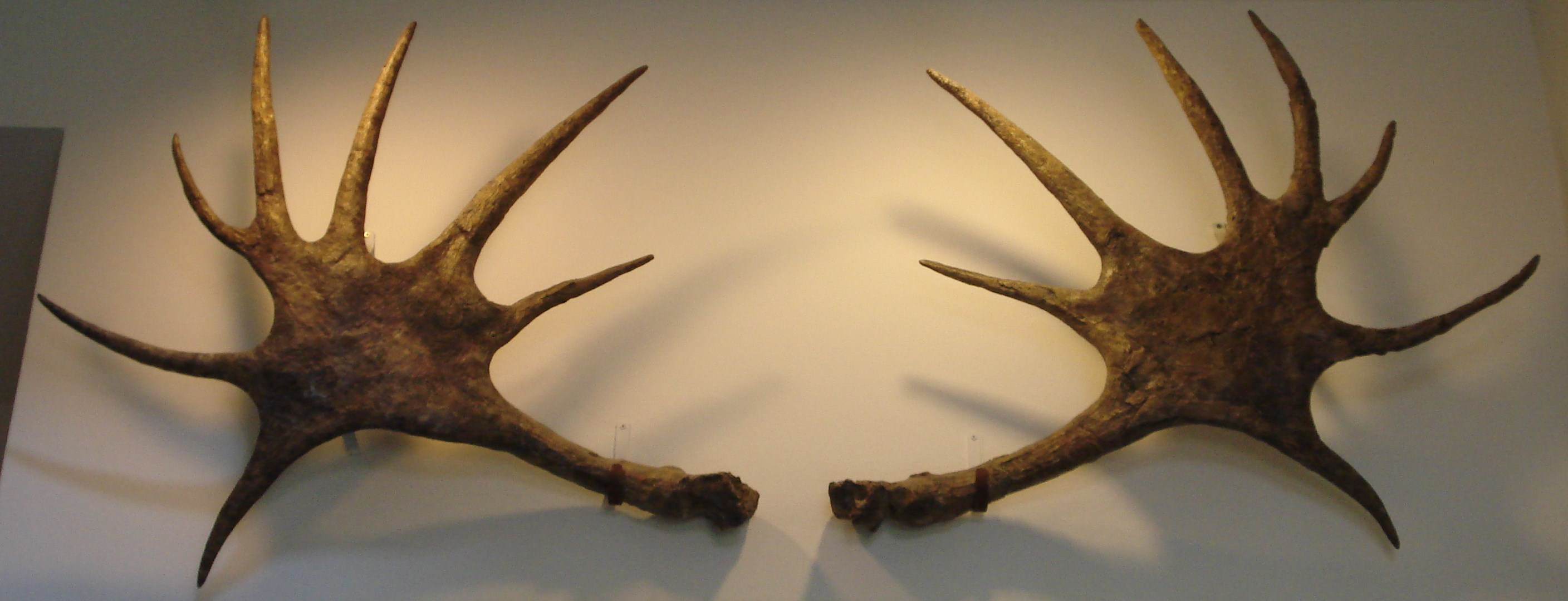
- Pair of antlers from the Geological-Paleontological Museum, Aalen

Scientific classification
- Kingdom: Animalia
- Phylum: Chordata
- Class: Mammalia
- Order: Artiodactyla
- Family: Cervidae
- Subfamily: Capreolinae
- Genus: †Cervalces
- Species: †C. latifrons

Binomial name
- †Cervalces latifrons Johnson, 1874

Synonyms
- Alces latifrons Libralces latifrons Cervalces alaskensis

= Cervalces latifrons =

Cervalces latifrons Temporal range: Early to Late Pleistocene

Extinct species of deer

Cervalces latifrons, the broad-fronted moose, or the giant moose was a giant species of deer that inhabited Europe and Asia during the Pleistocene epoch. It is thought to be the ancestor of the modern moose, as well as the extinct North American Cervalces scotti. It was considerably larger than living moose, placing it as one of the largest deer to have ever lived.

== History of discovery ==
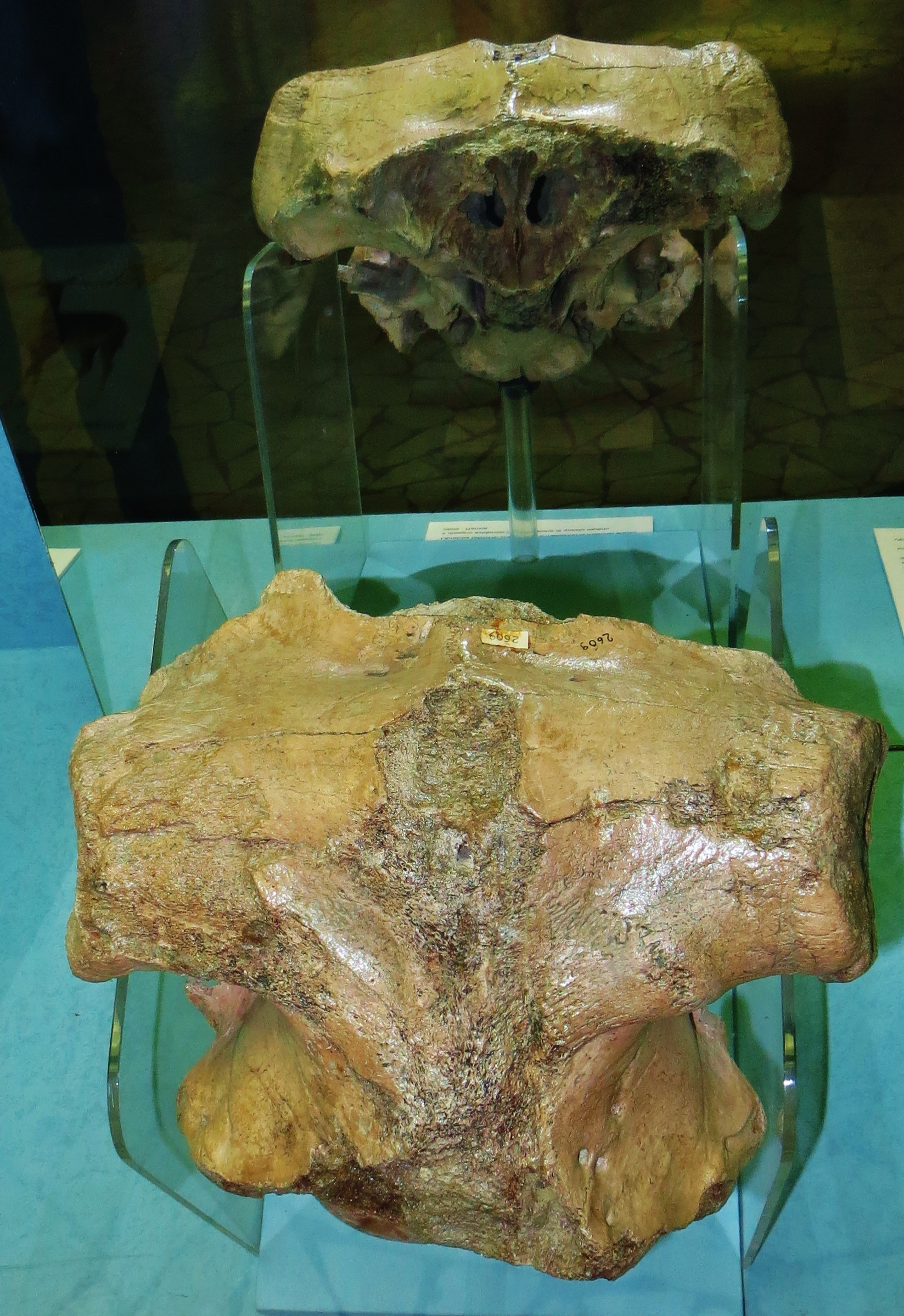
Fossils in Bergamo

Cervalces latifrons was first described by Mr Randall Johnson in 1874. A frontal bone attached to part of an antler of a previously unknown species of deer was found at low tide on the beachfront at Happisburgh, Norfolk, in the "Forest Bed". Johnson, who retained the specimen in his collection, named it Cervus latifrons, Cervus being the only genus of deer known at that time. The specific name "latifrons" refers to the wide frontal bone of this large species. The morphology of the animal as deduced from this fossil and from others later found in this formation and in continental Europe differs little from modern moose. It was later placed in the genus Cervalces which it shares with the also extinct Cervalces scotti from North America.

== Description ==
The antlers of the males had longer beams than living moose, with large vertically-oriented flat palmate lobes with a variable number of points. It has been suggested that due to their shape, it is unlikely that they were used for combat. The average sized Cervalces latifrons was quite a bit more massive than other large moose-like deer, such Cervalces scotti, the largest races of the extant moose and the Irish elk (Megaloceros giganteus), despite some overlap in shoulder height, and is the largest deer ever known to exist. C. latifrons is estimated to have reached 2.1 m (6 ft 11 in) to 2.4 m (7 ft 10 in) high at the shoulder. Body mass of C. latifrons was around 1,000 kg (2,200 lb), putting it around 30% heavier than C. scotti. In some cases, this species could have weighed perhaps up to 1,200 kg (2,600 lb) with the largest specimens perhaps reaching 2.5 m (8.2 ft) at the shoulder. It was about the same mass and far taller than a modern bull American bison (Bison bison) and could have weighed about twice as much as the Irish elk (Megaloceros giganteus) With 3 to 3,4 meters, the antler span was around the same as the Irish elk. In comparison to the modern moose, the nares are not retracted and are similar to those of other deer. It is unclear whether C. latifrons had a prehensile upper lip like living moose.

== Distribution and habitat ==
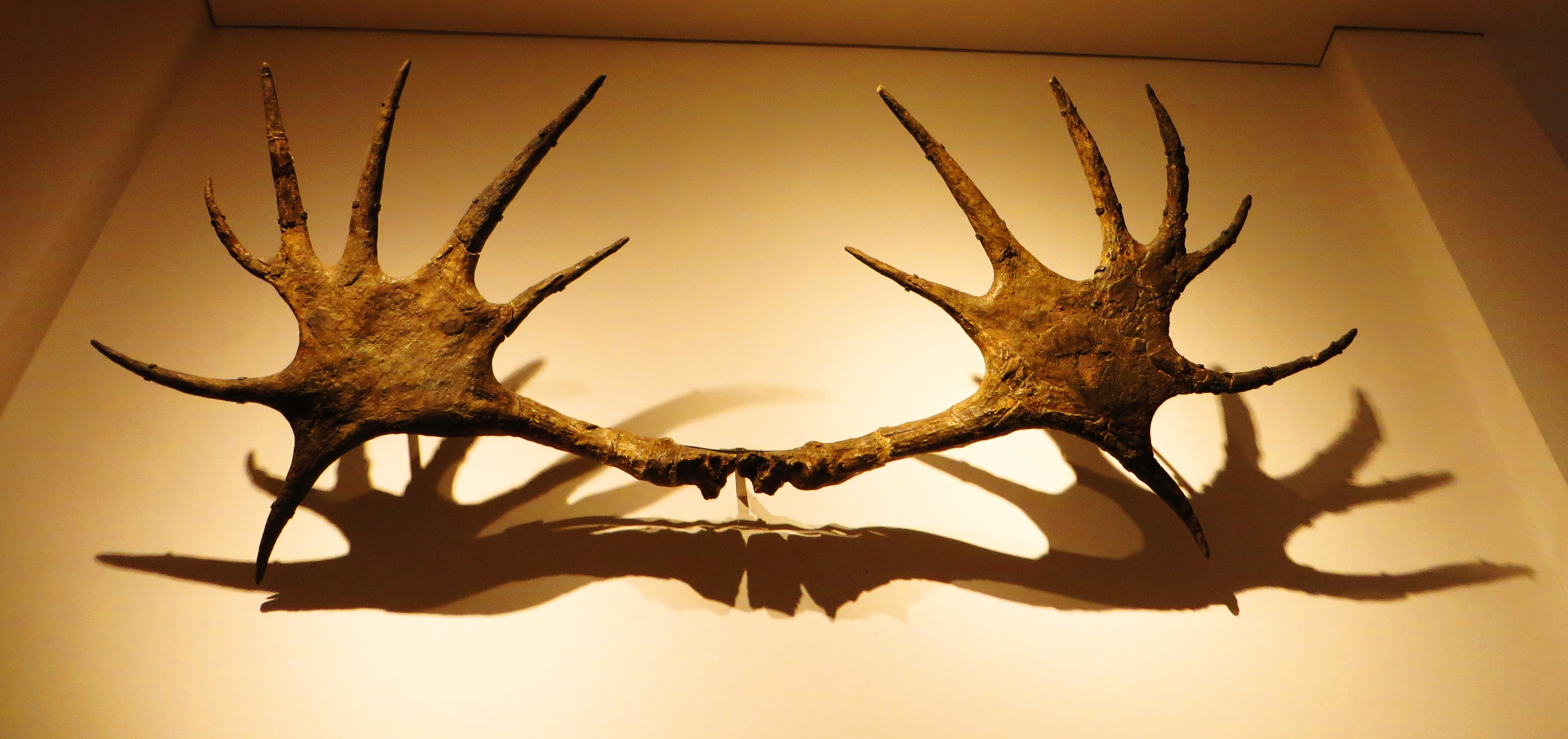
Antlers in Tübingen

Fossil remains of this deer are known from northern Europe and Asia but have not been found in the Iberian Peninsula, Italy south of the Apennines, Croatia or Greece. In the United Kingdom, it is known only from the Cromer Forest Bed Formation. This is exposed at intervals along the coast of Norfolk and Suffolk and forms low cliffs between Cromer and Great Yarmouth. The holotype came from here. It is believed that Cervalces latifrons resembled its modern moose relations and lived in tundra, steppes, coniferous forests and swamps. It probably avoided deciduous forests because of the inconvenience that would be caused by its wide antlers when moving among bushes and saplings. Like its living relatives, it is likely to have lived a solitary life. It is believed to have fed on rough herbage and plants growing around lakes and swamps. Further remains of Cervalces latifrons have been recovered from Sénèze (Haute-Loire, France), Mauer (Baden-Württemberg, Germany), Bilshausen (Niedersachsen, Germany), Mosbach (Hessen, Germany), Süßenborn (Thüringen, Germany), Ranica (Lombardy, Italy), Leffe (Lombardy, Italy) and Crostolo Creek (Emilia-Romagna, Italy) and extensively from Siberia.

== Evolutionary history ==
Cervalces latifrons first appeared during the late Early Pleistocene. Probably during the Middle Pleistocene, it entered North America, giving rise to Cervalces scotti. In Europe, Cervalces latifrons became extinct around the end of the Middle Pleistocene and beginning of the Late Pleistocene, being replaced by its descendant the modern moose.

== Ecology ==
A palaeobotanical study was made of clay found inside the skull of a specimen of Cervalces latifrons found at Fornaci di Ranica in northern Italy dating back to the early Pleistocene. The site was fluvial deposits in the basin of the Serio River. The infrared spectrum of the clay and the pollen grains found in it were compared with a previously available chronological sequence of pollens from sediments in the area. The results suggest that the vegetation in the region at the time in which the moose lived consisted of sparse coniferous forests with Pinus sylvestris and Pinus mugo, steppes and grassland. In the immediate vicinity, it correlated with a retreat of forest cover and an increase in herbaceous ground cover. The valley bottoms probably had standing water, marsh vegetation, moist meadows, bushes and flowering plants. A morpho-functional analysis of Cervalces latifrons comparing it with its modern deer relatives, Cervus spp., suggests similarities in diet and in adaptations for living in a marshy environment with scattered scrub and debris.

== Biology ==
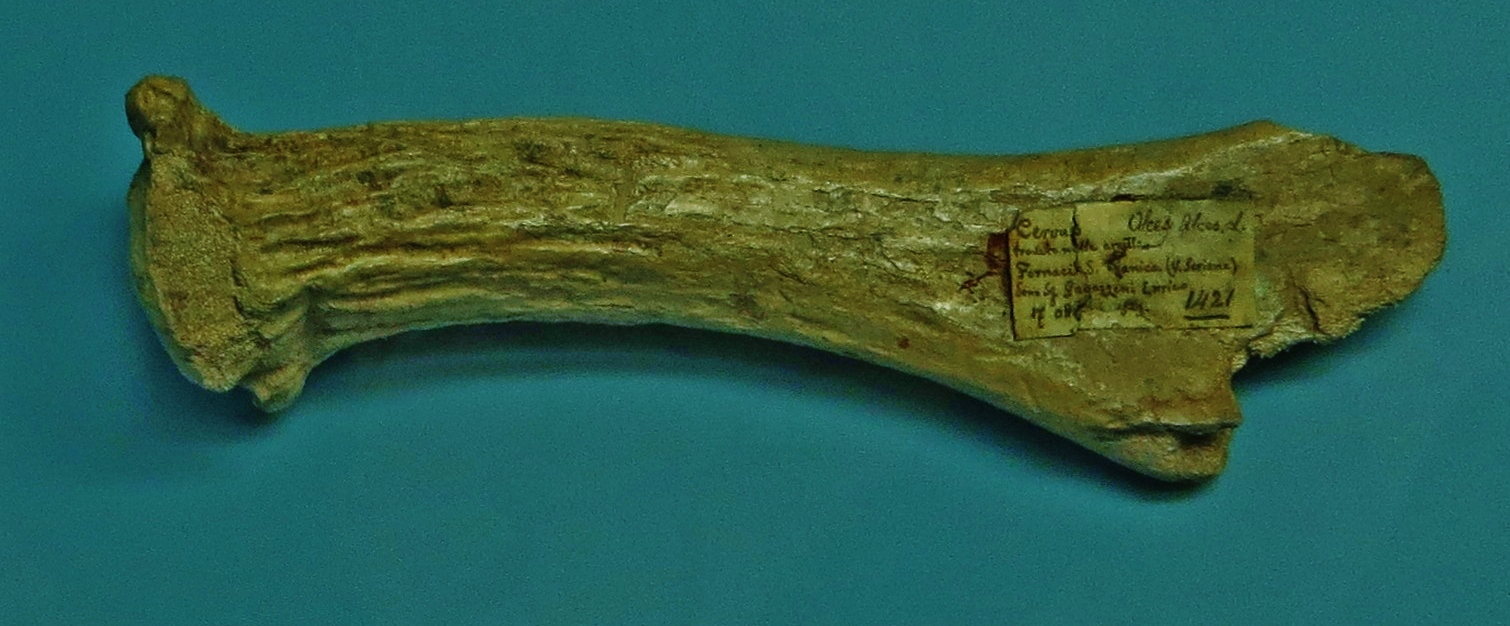
Partial antler

Cervalces latifrons shares many anatomical features with its living relative, the moose (British English "elk", Alces alces) with similarities in its grinding molars, narrow jaw, large mouth cavity, elongated muzzle and premaxillary bones. It is likely to have had a similar diet of bark, leaves and shoots of trees such as willow, aspen, rowan, birch, oak, larch and pine. It would also have grazed herbaceous vegetation in the boggy areas on the floors of valleys. Its limbs were long and show adaptations allowing for locomotion at a fast trot known as "stilt-locomotion". This involves a long stride with a high elevation of the feet at each step. This gait is helpful for moving through bogs or deep snow. The toes could be spread widely which would have aided swimming and prevented the foot sinking deeply when walking in marshy conditions.
