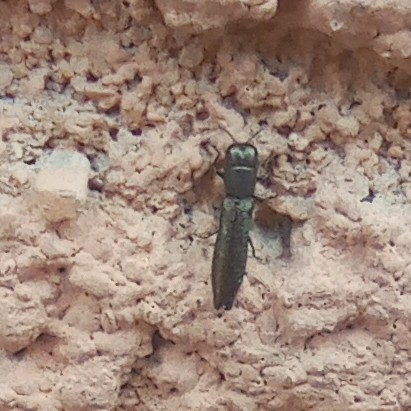
- Cylindromorphus filum, Russia

Scientific classification
- Kingdom: Animalia
- Phylum: Arthropoda
- Clade: Pancrustacea
- Class: Insecta
- Order: Coleoptera
- Suborder: Polyphaga
- Infraorder: Elateriformia
- Family: Buprestidae
- Subtribe: Cylindromorphina
- Genus: Cylindromorphus; Kiesenwetter, 1857

= Cylindromorphus =

Genus of beetles

Cylindromorphus is a genus of jewel beetles in the beetle family Buprestidae. There are about 19 described species in Cylindromorphus, found in the Palearctic.

== Species ==
These 19 species belong to the genus Cylindromorphus:

- Cylindromorphus acus Abeille de Perrin, 1897
- Cylindromorphus araxidis Reitter, 1889
- Cylindromorphus bifrons Rey, 1889
- Cylindromorphus bohemicus Obenberger, 1933
- Cylindromorphus caspicus Obenberger, 1934
- Cylindromorphus cribratus Abeille de Perrin, 1897
- Cylindromorphus dalmatinus Csiki, 1915
- Cylindromorphus filum (Gyllenhal, 1817)
- Cylindromorphus gallicus Mulsant & Rey, 1863
- Cylindromorphus opacus Abeille de Perrin, 1897
- Cylindromorphus parallelus Fairmaire, 1859
- Cylindromorphus platiai Curletti, 1981
- Cylindromorphus popovi (Mannerheim, 1853)
- Cylindromorphus pubescens Semenov, 1895
- Cylindromorphus pyrethri Stierlin, 1863
- Cylindromorphus strictipennis Reitter, 1895
- Cylindromorphus talyshensis Kalashian, 1998
- Cylindromorphus turkestanicus Abeille de Perrin, 1904
- Cylindromorphus vedicus Kalashian, 2002
