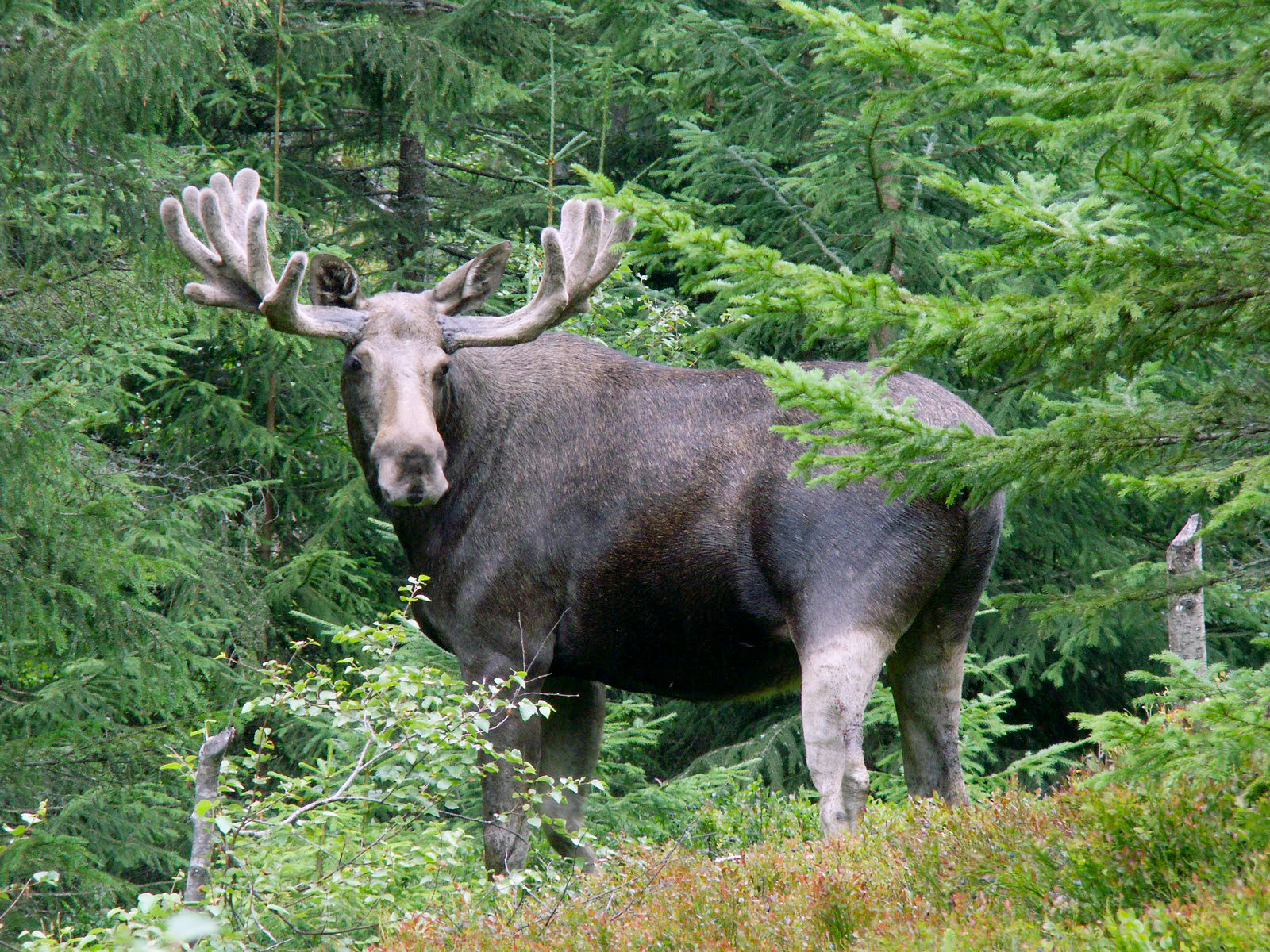
- Alces alces alces, bull, Telemark, Norway

Scientific classification
- Kingdom: Animalia
- Phylum: Chordata
- Class: Mammalia
- Infraclass: Placentalia
- Order: Artiodactyla
- Family: Cervidae
- Subfamily: Capreolinae
- Tribe: Alceini
- Genus: Alces; Gray, 1821

Type species
- Cervus alces Linnaeus, 1758

Species
- Alces alces; †Alces gallicus?

= Alces =

Genus of deer

Alces is a genus of artiodactyl mammals, that includes the largest species of the deer family.

== Taxonomy ==
Current thinking accepts two species in genus, the extant elk or moose (Alces alces) and the fossil Alces gallicus (also known as the Villafranchian elk or weighing scale elk), that existed in the Pleistocene about 2 million years ago. Sometimes only one species is included in the genus, the modern elk or moose (Alces alces), with the extinct Villafranchian elk being referred to a separate genus, either in Cervalces, or Libralces, since the structure of its antlers differed.

Sometimes the species Alces alces is divided into two separate species, the elk (A. alces sensu stricto, in northern Europe and northwestern Asia) and the moose (A. americanus, in North America and northeastern Asia), but recent opinion has tended to treat these as subspecies of one species. In this treatment, the moose includes all subspecies of Alces alces except the European elk (nominate A. a. alces) and the recently extinct Caucasian elk (A. a. caucasicus), which belong to the elk group. Whether there is one or two modern species in the genus remains controversial. These animals were often divided into two species because the North American and Asian animals have a greater number of chromosomes than the European subspecies; elk have 68 chromosomes, while moose have 70. However, this does not prevent extensive hybridisation where their ranges meet along the Yenisei in Siberia.

== Gallery ==
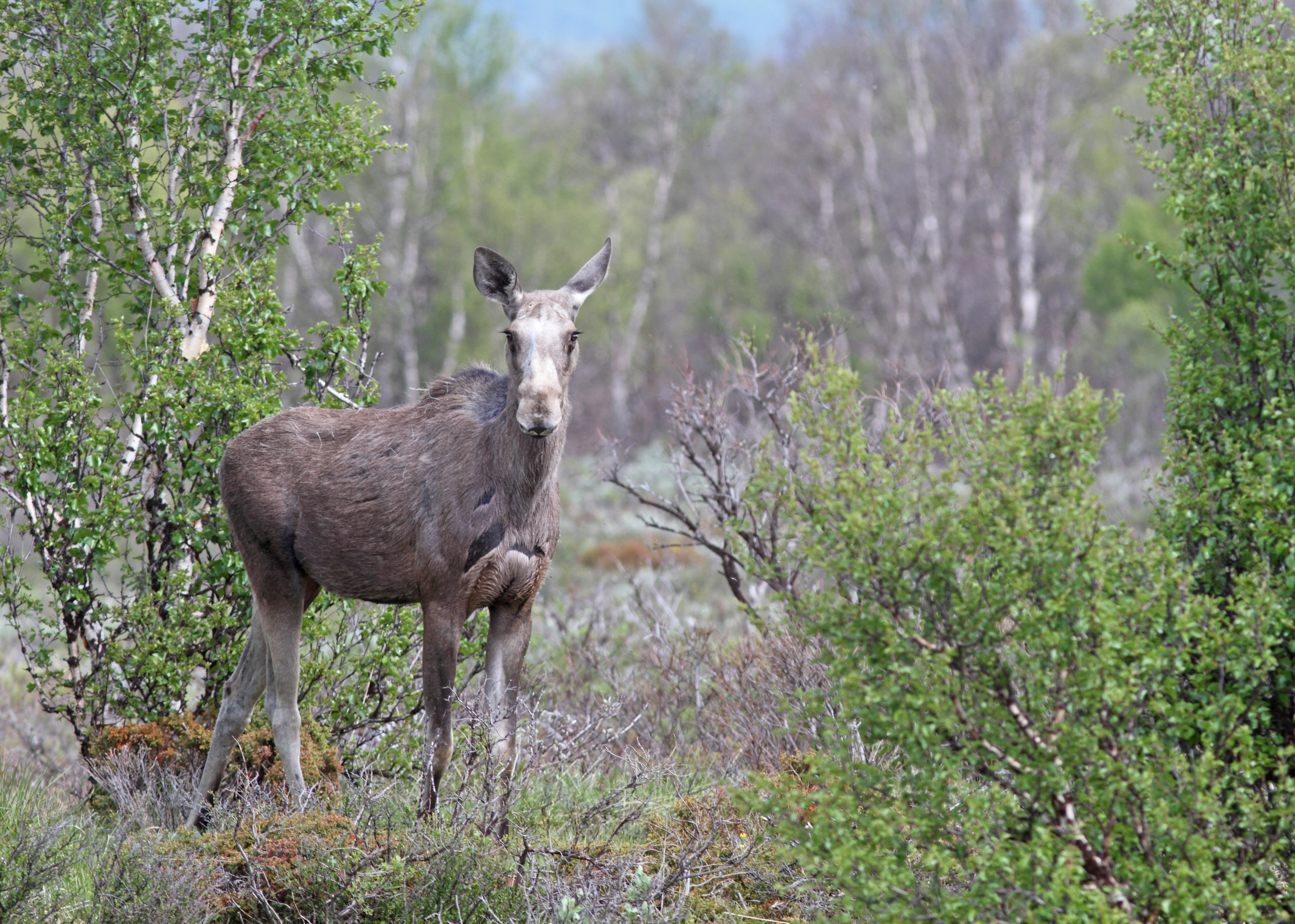
Elk (A. alces alces), cow, Fokstumyra, Norway

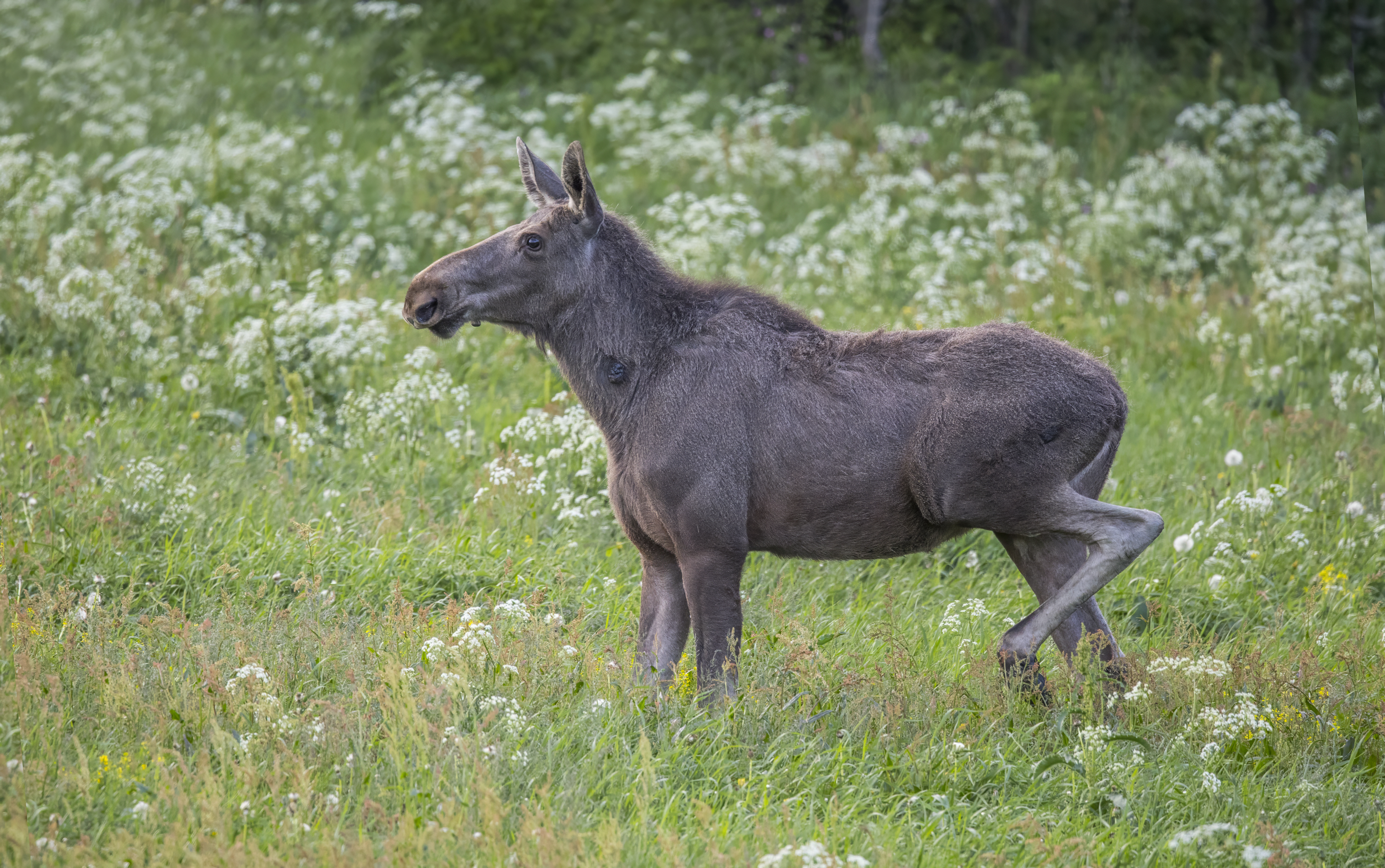
Elk (A. alces alces), cow, Oppdal, Norway

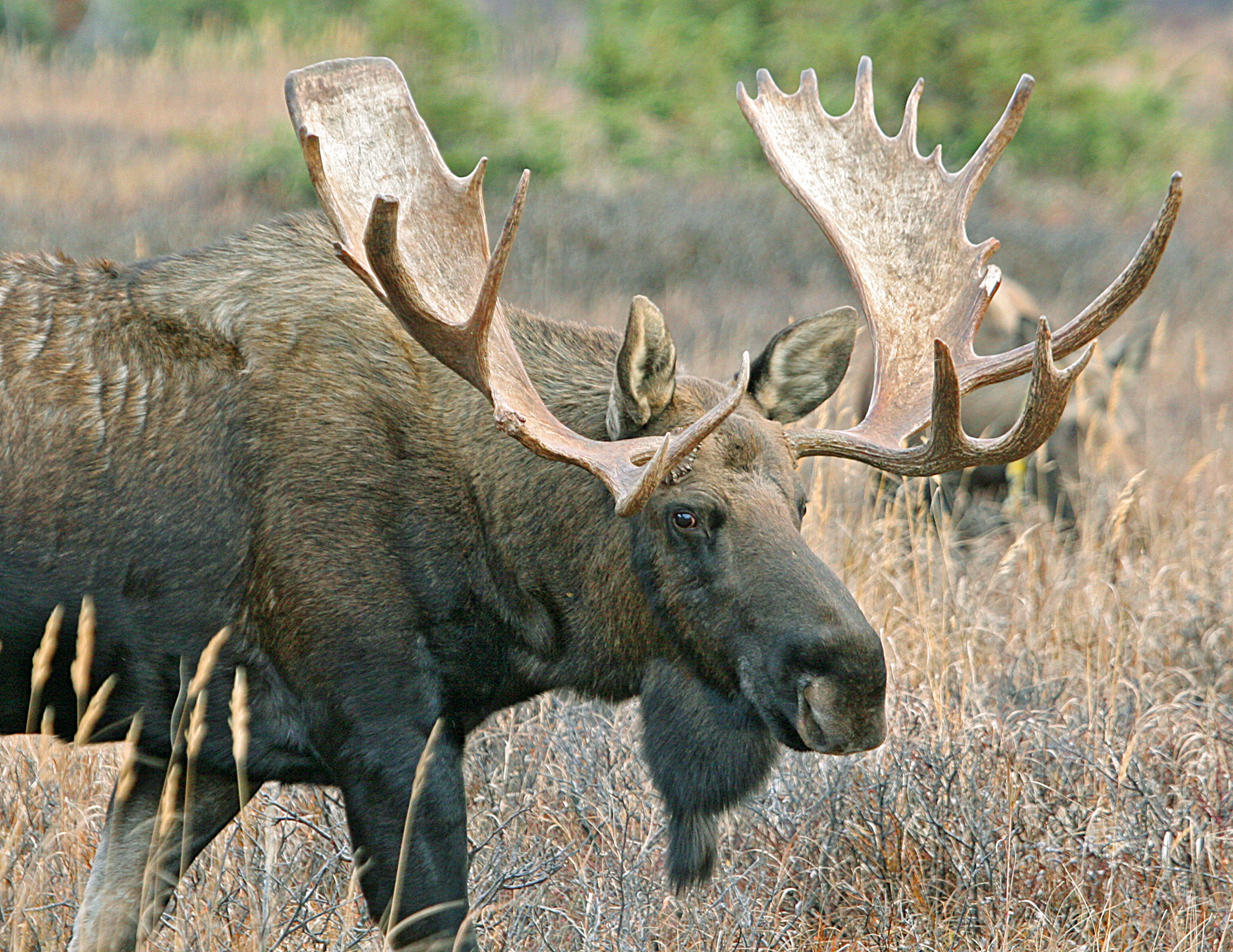
Alaska moose (A. alces gigas or A. americanus gigas), bull, Alaska

Shiras moose (A. alces shirasi or A. americanus shirasi), bull, Wyoming

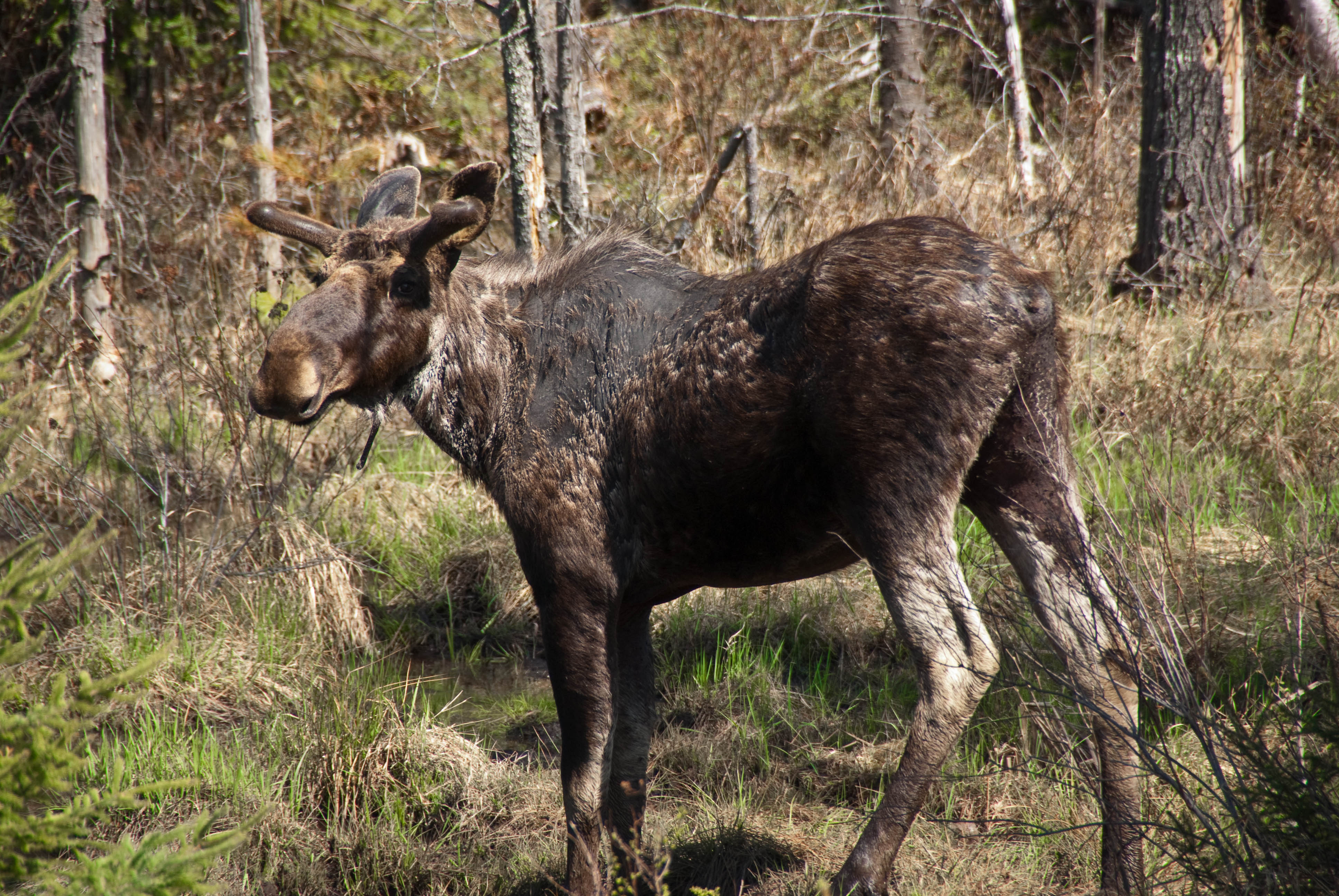
Eastern moose (A. alces americanus or A. americanus americanus)
