= Jordi Agustí =

Spanish paleontologist

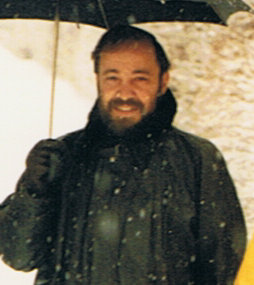
Jordi Agustí, Spanish paleontologist.

Jordi Agustí is a Spanish paleontologist at the Instituto de Paleoecología Humana y Evolución Social at the Universitat Rovira i Virgili. His research is mainly focused on the evolution of mammal fossils in relation to changing climates in the last 10 million years. He has led investigations in Europe and in North Africa, and he was part of the team that discovered some of the oldest Eurasian hominids in Dmanisi, Georgia.

He has published at least half a dozen books on science. These include:

- La evolución y sus metáforas (1994)
- Mammoths, sabertooths, and Hominids (2002)
- Fósiles, genes y teorías (2003)
- El ajedrez de la vida (Crítica, 2010)
- La gran migración (Crítica, 2011);
- Los primeros pobladores de Europa (2012)
- (with Enric Bufill and Marina Mosquera) El precio de la inteligencia (Crítica, 2012).

In 2002, he received the Premio de Literatura Científica from the Fundació Catalana per a la Recerca i la innovació for El secreto de Darwin. The following year, the Generalitat de Catalunya granted him the Narcís Monturiol Medal for scientific merit.
