= Blackbeard Island white-tailed deer =

Conservation status
- Critically Imperiled (NatureServe)

Scientific classification
- Kingdom: Animalia
- Phylum: Chordata
- Class: Mammalia
- Order: Artiodactyla
- Family: Cervidae
- Subfamily: Capreolinae
- Genus: Odocoileus
- Species: O. virginianus
- Subspecies: O. v. nigribarbis

Trinomial name
- Odocoileus virginianus nigribarbis Goldman & Kellogg, 1940
- Range is located at number 21

Rare subspecies of deer

The Blackbeard Island white-tailed deer (Odocoileus virginianus nigribarbis) or the Blackbeard Island deer, is a very rare subspecies of the white-tailed deer that is endemic to Blackbeard Island, Georgia. It is listed as "Critically Imperiled" by NatureServe, for its range only covers only 5,618 acres of land with limited habitats and potentially low populations, although the subspecies is provided a source of protection from the Blackbeard Island National Wildlife Refuge. The Blackbeard Island white-tailed deer is one of four white-tailed deer subspecies that are endemic to islands within the United States, with every island being remarkably small.
