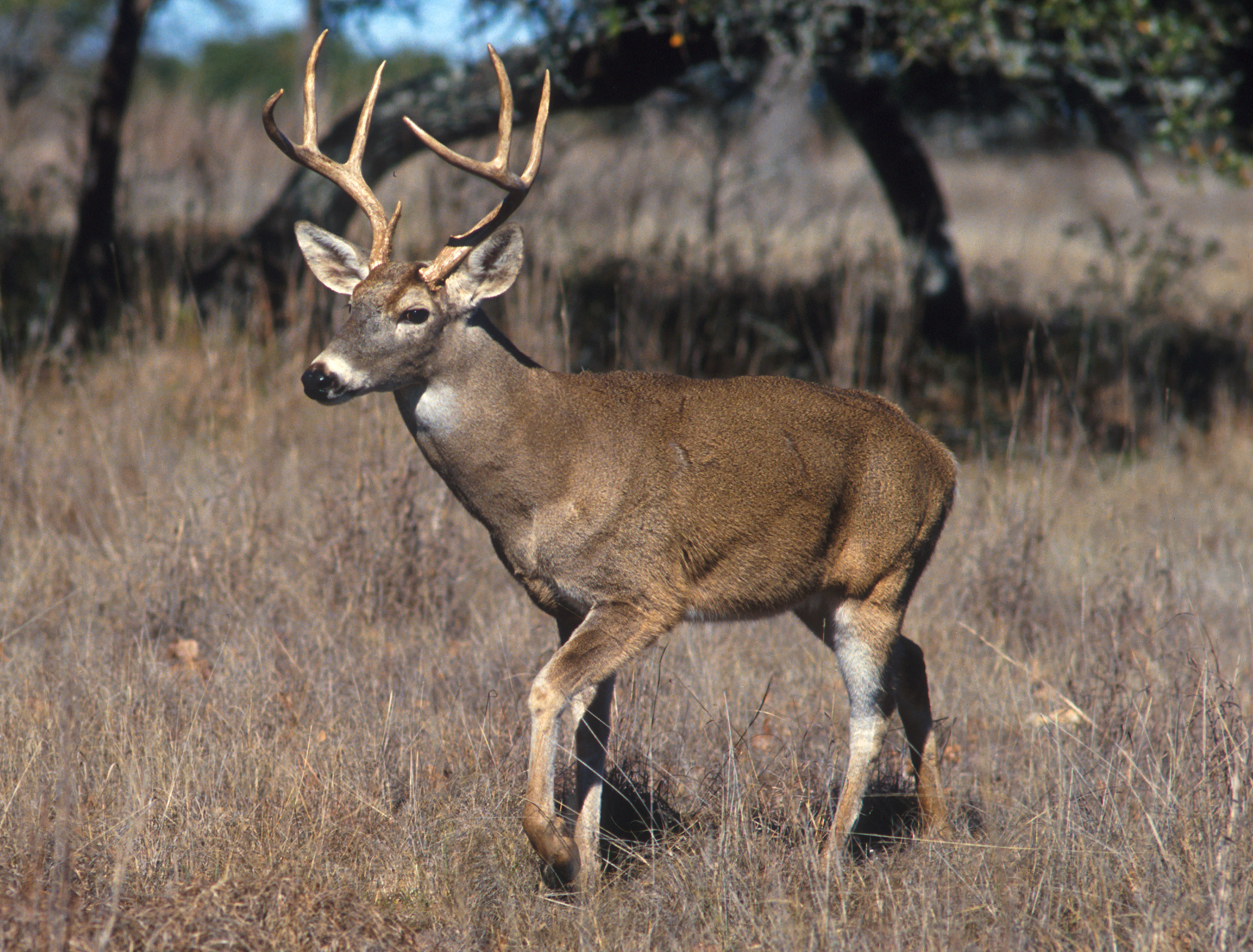
- Male (buck)
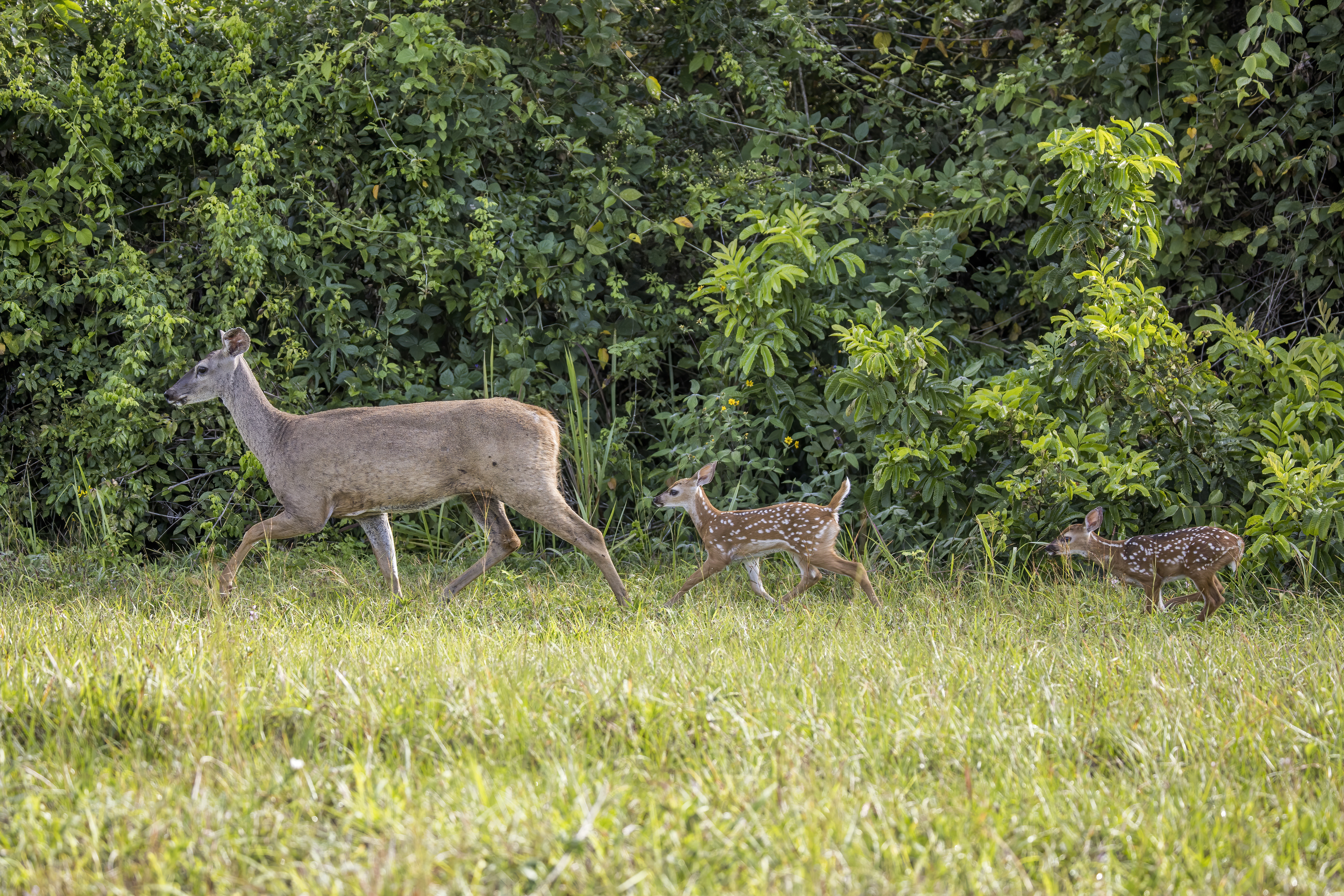
- Female (doe) O. v. nelsoni with juveniles (fawns)

Conservation status
- Least Concern (IUCN 3.1)

- Secure (NatureServe)

Scientific classification
- Kingdom: Animalia
- Phylum: Chordata
- Class: Mammalia
- Order: Artiodactyla
- Family: Cervidae
- Subfamily: Capreolinae
- Genus: Odocoileus
- Species: O. virginianus

Binomial name
- Odocoileus virginianus (Zimmermann, 1780)

Subspecies
- 38, see text
- White-tailed deer range map

Synonyms
- Dama virginiana Zimmermann, 1780; Dama virginianus Zimmermann, 1780

= White-tailed deer =

Species of deer

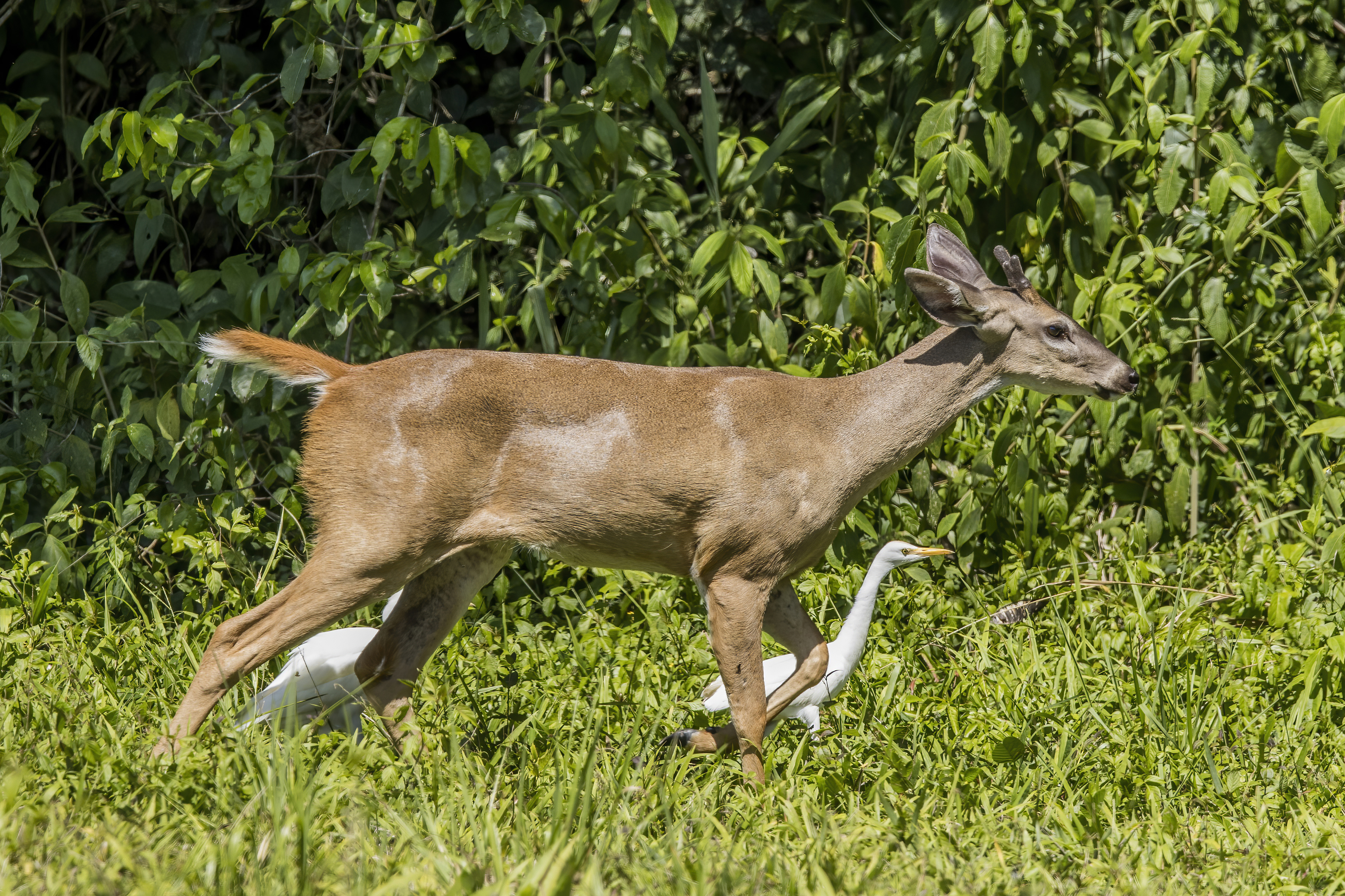
Male O. v. nelsoni with antlers in velvet

The white-tailed deer (Odocoileus virginianus), also known commonly as the whitetail and the Virginia deer, is a medium-sized species of deer native to North and South America. It is the most widely distributed mainland ungulate herbivore in the Americas; coupled with its natural predator, the mountain lion (Puma concolor), it is one of the most widely distributed terrestrial mammal species in the Americas and the world. Highly adaptable, the various subspecies of white-tailed deer inhabit many different ecosystems, from arid grasslands to the Amazon and Orinoco basins; from the Llanos to the high-elevation terrain of the Andes.

== Distribution ==
In North America, the white-tailed deer is very common (even considered a nuisance in some areas) in states to the east and south of the Rocky Mountains, including southwestern Arizona, with the exception of the American West Coast and Baja California Peninsula, where its ecological niche is filled by the black-tailed deer (in the Pacific Northwest) or the mule deer (Odocoileus hemionus) from that point west except for mixed deciduous riparian corridors, river valley bottomlands, and lower foothills of the northern Rocky Mountain region from Wyoming west to eastern Washington and eastern Oregon, and north to northeastern British Columbia and southern Yukon, including in the Montana valley and foothill grasslands. The westernmost population of the species, known as the Columbian white-tailed deer, was once widespread in the mixed forests along the Willamette and Cowlitz River valleys of western Oregon and southwestern Washington, but current numbers are considerably reduced, and it is classified as near-threatened by the IUCN. This population is separated from other white-tailed deer populations.

Texas is home to by far the most individual white-tailed deer of all U.S. states, Canadian provinces, or Latin American countries, with an estimated population of 5.3 million, with both wild deer and farmed herds, the latter raised for large rack size and breeding. High populations of white-tailed deer are known to exist on the Edwards Plateau of Central Texas, as well as in Illinois, Indiana, Iowa, Maryland, Michigan, Minnesota, Mississippi, Missouri, New Jersey, New York, North Dakota, Ohio, Pennsylvania, and Wisconsin. The conversion of land adjacent to the Canadian Rockies to agricultural use, and partial clear-cutting of coniferous trees (resulting in widespread deciduous vegetation), has been favorable to the white-tailed deer and has extended its distribution to as far northwest as the Yukon. Populations of white-tailed deer around the Great Lakes have expanded their range north and westward, also due to conversion of land to agricultural use, with local caribou, elk, and moose populations declining. White-tailed deer are crepuscular, meaning they are most active at dawn and dusk, sporadically resting throughout the day and night.

Globally, the white-tailed deer has been introduced (primarily for sport hunting) to New Zealand, Nova Scotia (where they killed off the native caribou via brainworm), Prince Edward Island (where they were eradicated), New Brunswick (although native in some areas around Quebec), the Greater Antilles of the Caribbean (Cuba, Jamaica, Hispaniola, and Puerto Rico), and some countries in Europe (mainly the Czech Republic, Finland, France, Germany, Romania and Serbia).

== Taxonomy ==
Some taxonomists have attempted to separate white-tailed deer into a host of subspecies, based largely on morphological differences. Genetic studies, however, suggest fewer subspecies within the animal's range, as compared to the 30 to 40 subspecies that some scientists have described in the last century. The Florida Key deer, O. v. clavium, and the Columbian white-tailed deer, O. v. leucurus, are both listed as endangered under the U.S. Endangered Species Act. In the United States, the Virginia white-tail, O. v. virginianus, is among the most widespread subspecies. Several local deer populations, especially in the southern United States, are descended from white-tailed deer transplanted from various localities east of the Continental Divide. Some of these deer populations may have been from as far north as the Great Lakes region to as far west as Texas, yet are also quite at home in the Appalachian and Piedmont regions of the south. These deer, over time, have intermixed with the local indigenous deer (O. v. virginianus and/or O. v. macrourus) populations.

Central and South America have a complex number of white-tailed deer subspecies that range from Guatemala to as far south as Peru. This list of subspecies of deer is more exhaustive than the list of North American subspecies, and the number of subspecies is also questionable. However, the white-tailed deer populations in these areas are difficult to study, due to overhunting in many parts and a lack of protection. Some areas no longer carry deer, so assessing the genetic difference of these animals is difficult.

=== Subspecies ===
38 subspecies have been described; 17 of these occur in North America, ordered alphabetically (numbers in parentheses are range map locations.)

==== North and Central America ====
North and Central American subspecies ranges: 1. O. v. acapulcensis; 2. O. v. borealis; 4. O. v. carminis; 6. O. v. clavium; 7. O. v. couesi; 9. O. v. dacotensis; 12. O. v. hiltonensis; 13. O. v. leucurus; 14. O. v. macrourus; 15. O. v. mcilhennyi; 17. O. v. mexicanus; 18. O. v. miquihuanensis; 19. O. v. nelsoni; 20. O. v. nemoralis; 21. O. v. nigribarbis; 22. O. v. oaxacensis; 23. O. v. ochrourus; 24. O. v. osceola; 27. O. v. seminolus; 28. O. v. sinaloae; 29. O. v. taurinsulae; 30. O. v. texanus; 31. O. v. thomasi; 32. O. v. toltecus; 35. O. v. venatorius; 36. O. v. veraecrucis; 37. O. v. virginianus; 38. O. v. yucatanesis

- O. v. acapulcensis (1)– Acapulco white-tailed deer (Acapulco, SW Pacific Mexico)
- O. v. borealis (2)– Northern white-tailed deer (NE US, E Canada, the largest, darkest subspecies)
- O. v. carminis (4)– Carmen Mountains white-tailed deer (Texas-Mexico borderlands)
- O. v. chiriquensis (5)– Panamanian white-tailed deer (Panamá)
- O. v. clavium (6)– Key deer (Florida Keys)
- O. v. couesi (7)– Coues's / Arizona white-tailed / fantail deer (Arizona, New Mexico, Northern Mexico)
- O. v. dacotensis (9)– Dakota or northern plains white-tailed deer (North and South Dakota, US)
- O. v. hiltonensis (12)– Hilton Head Island white-tailed deer (South Carolina)
- O. v. leucurus (13)– Columbian white-tailed deer (Oregon and western coastal area)
- O. v. macrourus (14)– Kansas white-tailed deer (Kansas, US)
- O. v. mcilhennyi (15)– Avery Island white-tailed deer (Louisiana, US)
- O. v. mexicanus (17)– Mexican or Central Plateau white-tailed deer (central Mexico)
- O. v. miquihuanensis (18)– Miquihuan white-tailed deer (northern central Mexico)
- O. v. nelsoni (19)– Chiapas white-tailed deer (southern Mexico to Nicaragua)
- O. v. nemoralis (20)– Nicaraguan white-tailed deer (Gulf of Mexico south to Suriname; further restricted from Honduras to Panama)
- O. v. nigribarbis (21)– Blackbeard Island white-tailed deer (Georgia, US)
- O. v. oaxacensis (22)– Oaxaca white-tailed deer (Oaxaca, southern Mexico)
- O. v. ochrourus (23)– northwestern white-tailed deer or northern Rocky Mountains white-tailed deer
- O. v. osceola (24)– Florida coastal white-tailed deer (Gulf coast of Florida, Alabama)
- O. v. rothschildi (26)– Isla Coiba deer (Coiba Island, Panamá)
- O. v. seminolus (27)– Florida white-tailed deer (mainland Florida, US)
- O. v. sinaloae (28)– Sinaloa white-tailed deer (Sinaloa, Mexico)
- O. v. taurinsulae (29)– Bull Island white-tailed deer (Bulls Island, South Carolina)
- O. v. texanus (30)– Texas white-tailed deer (Texas, US)
- O. v. thomasi (31)– Mexican lowland white-tailed deer (southern Mexico)
- O. v. toltecu (32)– Rainforest white-tailed deer (southern Mexico and Guatemala to El Salvador)
- O. v. venatorius (35)– Hunting Island deer (Hunting Island, South Carolina)
- O. v. veraecrucis (36)– Northern Veracruz white-tailed deer (Veracruz, Mexico)
- O. v. virginianus (37)– Virginia or southern white-tailed deer (Virginia and West Virginia, US)
- O. v. yucatanesis (38)– Yucatán white-tailed deer (northern Yucatán Peninsula, Mexico)
Three O. v. borealis, New Hampshire

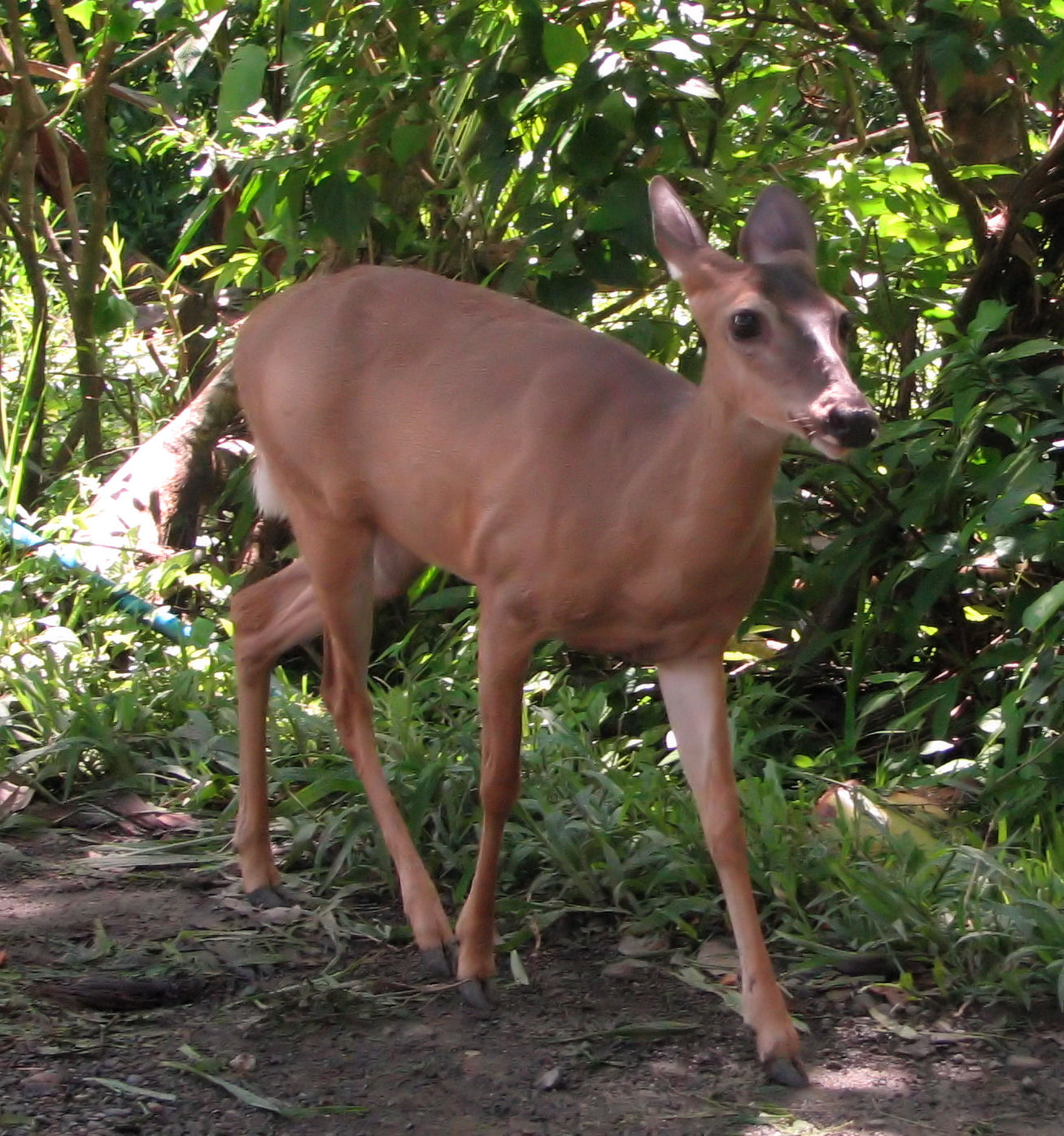
O. v. nemoralis, female, Costa Rica

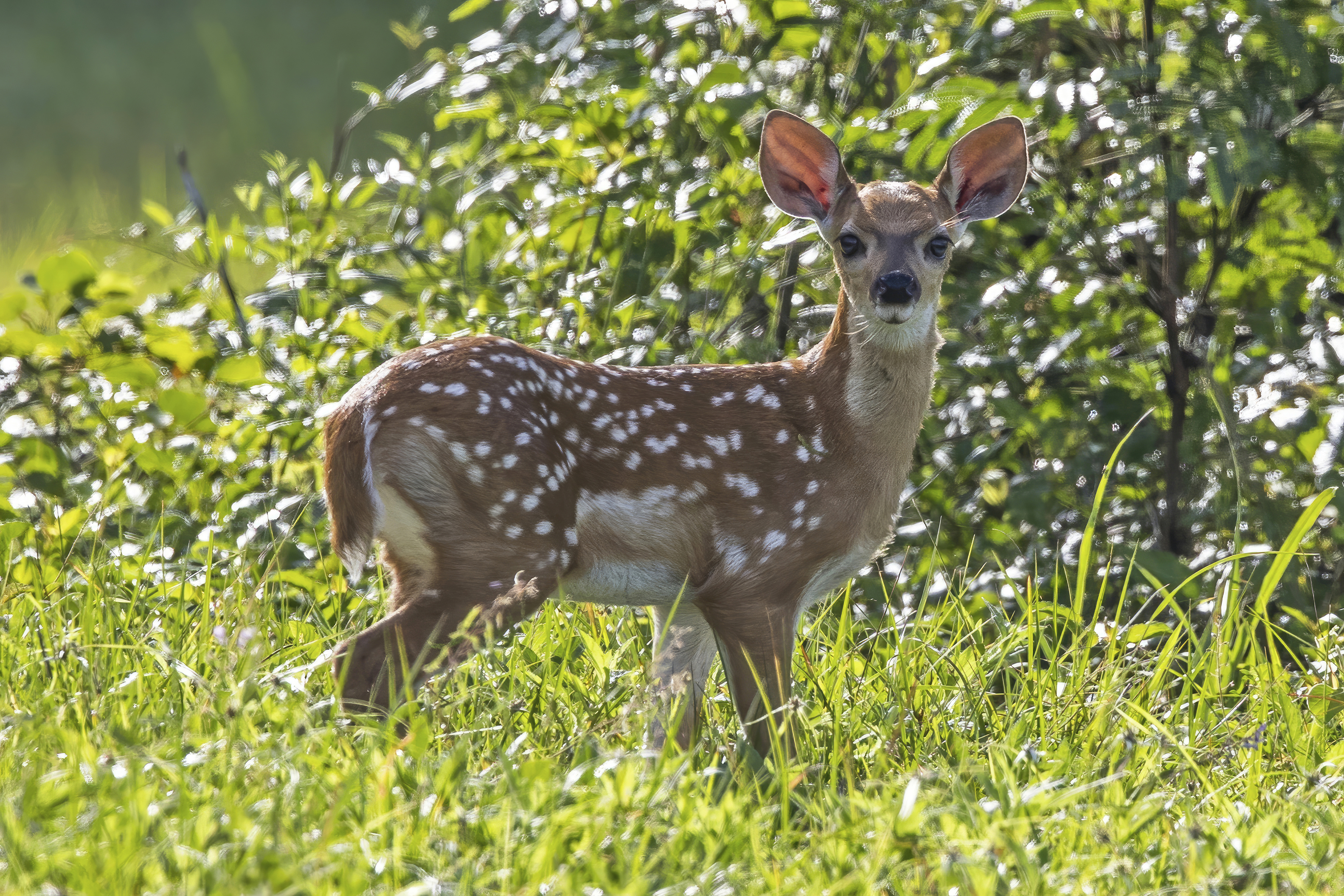
O. v. nelsoni, fawn about two weeks old, Belize

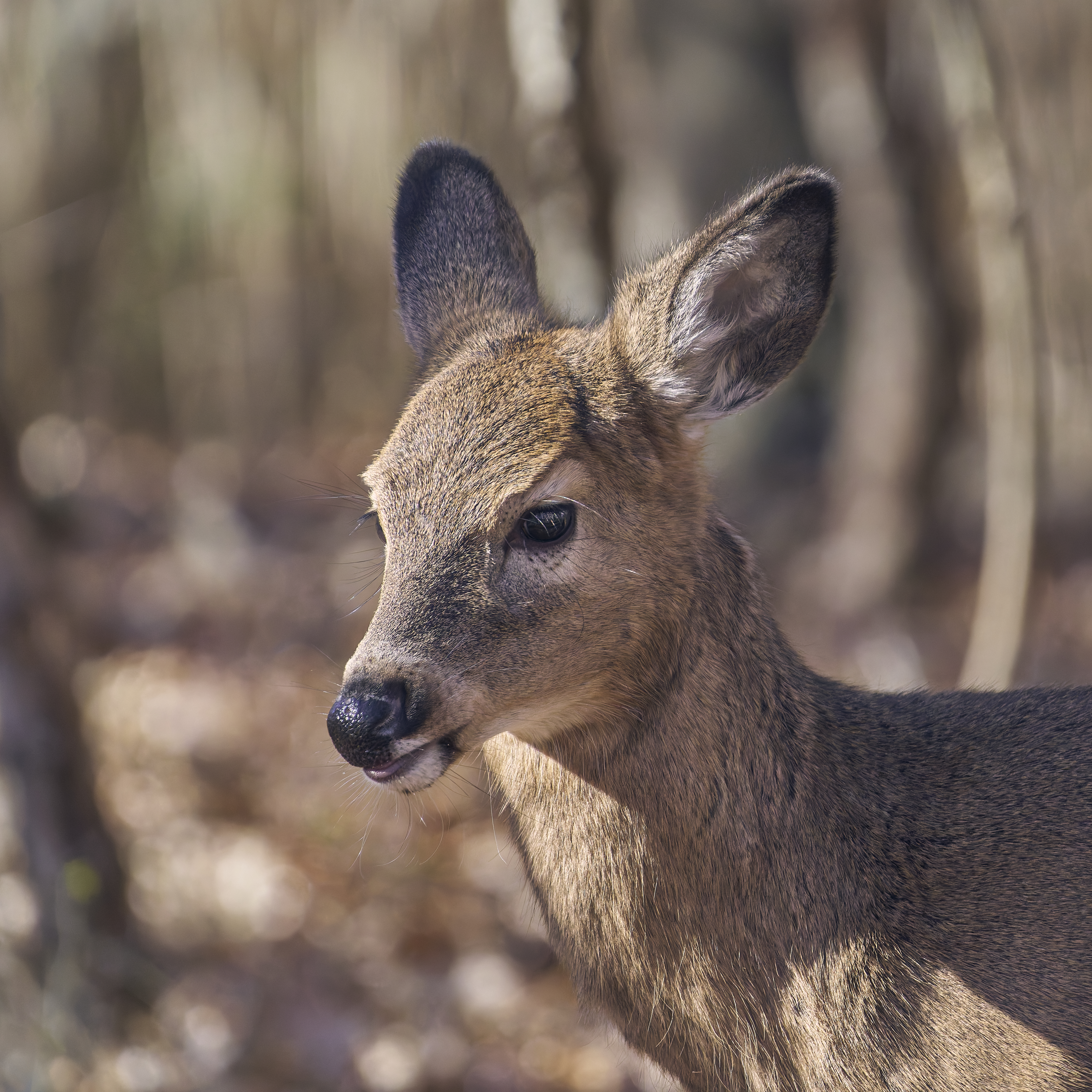
Closeup of O. v. borealis fawn.

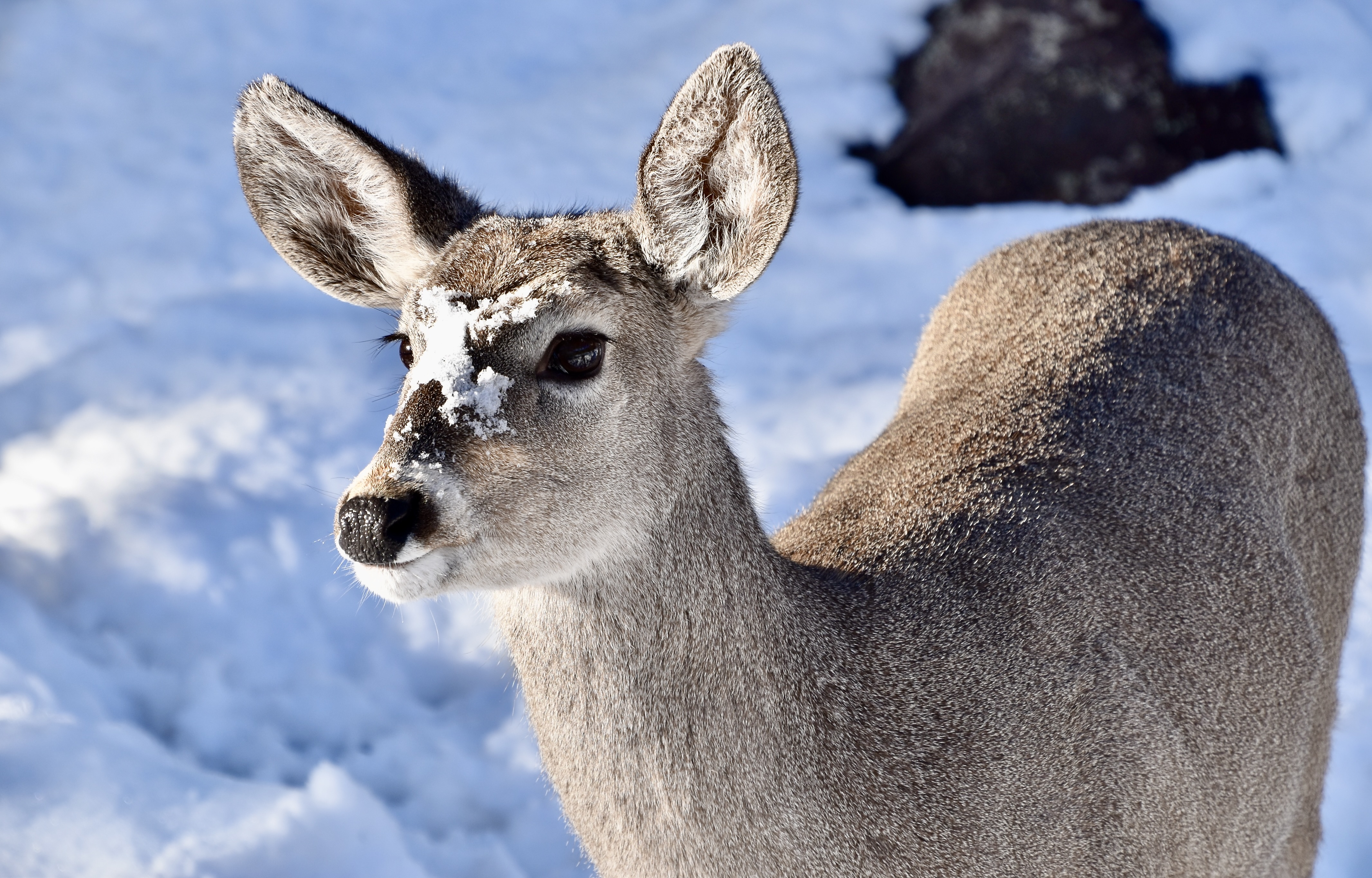
O. v. couesi doe at Grand Canyon Deer Farm.

==== South America ====
Central and South American subspecies ranges: 1. O. v. acapulcensis; 3. O. v. cariacou; 5. O. v. chiriquensis; 7. O. v. couesi; 8. O. v. curassavicus; 10. O. v. goudotii; 11. O. v. gymnotis; 16. O. v. margaritae; 17. O. v. mexicanus; 18. O. v. miquihuanensis; 19. O. v. nelsoni; 20. O. v. nemoralis; 22. O. v. oaxacensis; 25. O. v. peruvianus; 26. O. v. rothschildi; 28. O. v. sinaloae; 31. O. v. thomasi; 32. O. v. toltecus; 33. O. v. tropicalis; 34. O. v. ustus; 36. O. v. veraecrucis; 38. O. v. yucatanesis

- O. v. cariacou (3)– Llanos white-tailed deer (French Guiana and northern Brazil)
- O. v. curassavicus (8)– Curaçao white-tailed deer (Curaçao)
- O. v. goudotii (10)– Páramo white-tailed deer (Andean Colombia to western Venezuela)
- O. v. gymnotis (11)– Venezuelan white-tailed deer (northern Venezuela, including Llanos region)
- O. v. margaritae (16)– Margarita Island deer (Margarita Island)
- O. v. nemoralis (20)– Nicaraguan white-tailed deer (Gulf of Mexico to Suriname in South America; further restricted from Honduras to Panama)
- O. v. peruvianus (25)– Andean or South American white-tailed deer (most southerly distribution, to Peru and possibly Bolivia)
- O. v. tropicalis (33)– West Colombian white-tailed deer (Peru and Ecuador, possibly Colombia)
- O. v. ustus (34)– Ecuador white-tailed deer (Ecuador; possibly southern Colombia and northern Peru)
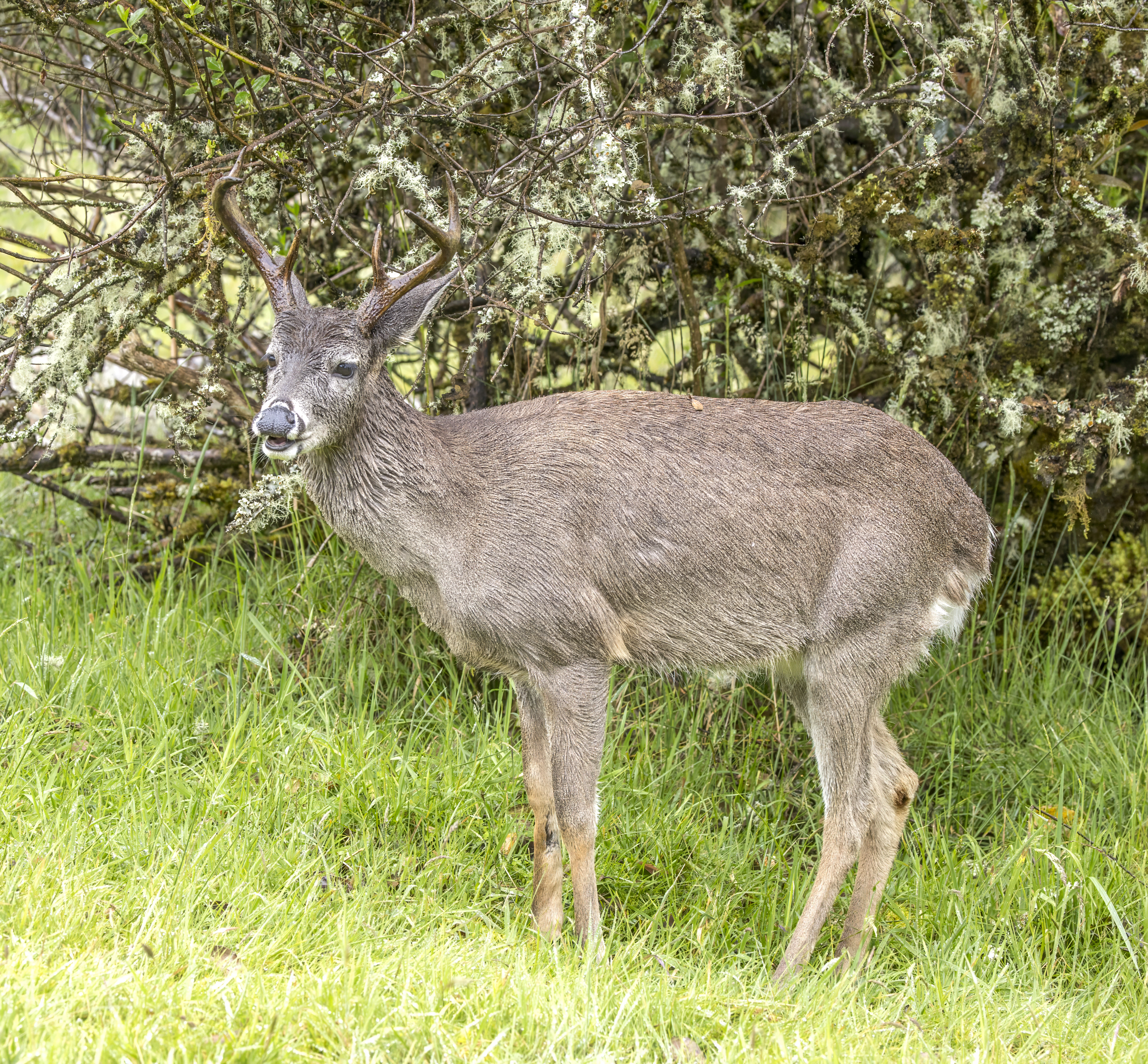
Male O. v. goudotii, Colombia

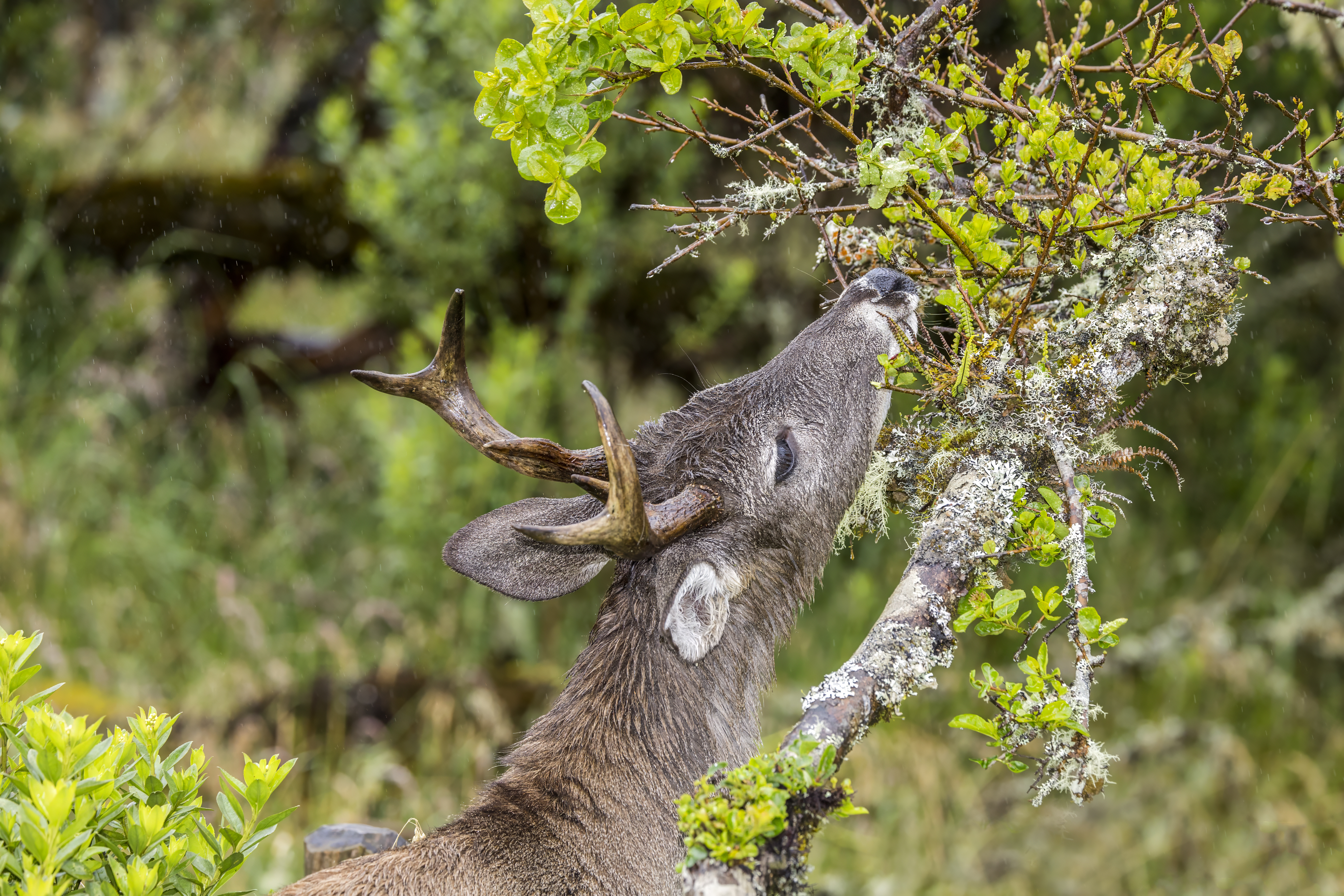
Male O. v. goudotii browsing, Colombia

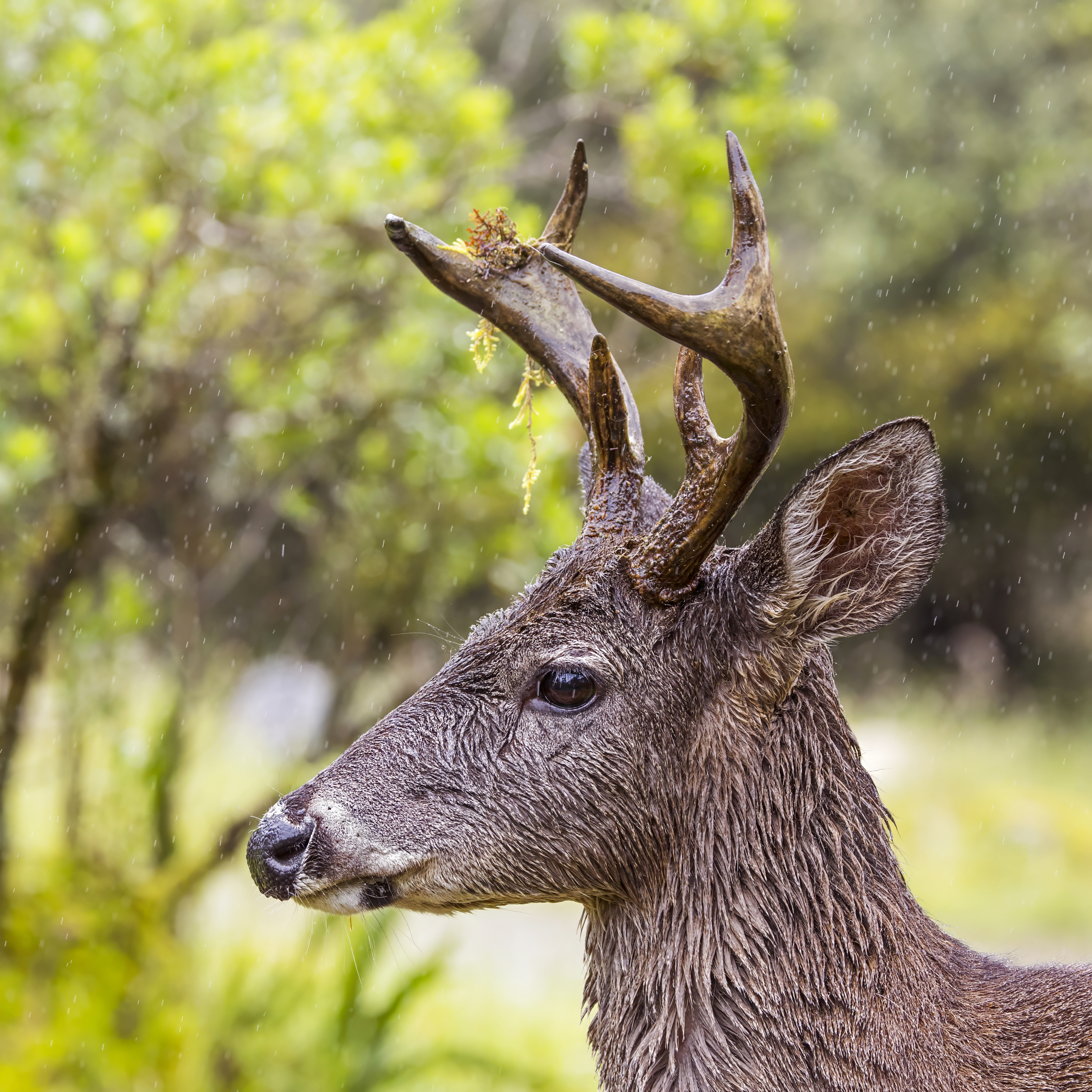
Male O. v. goudotii, Colombia

== Description ==
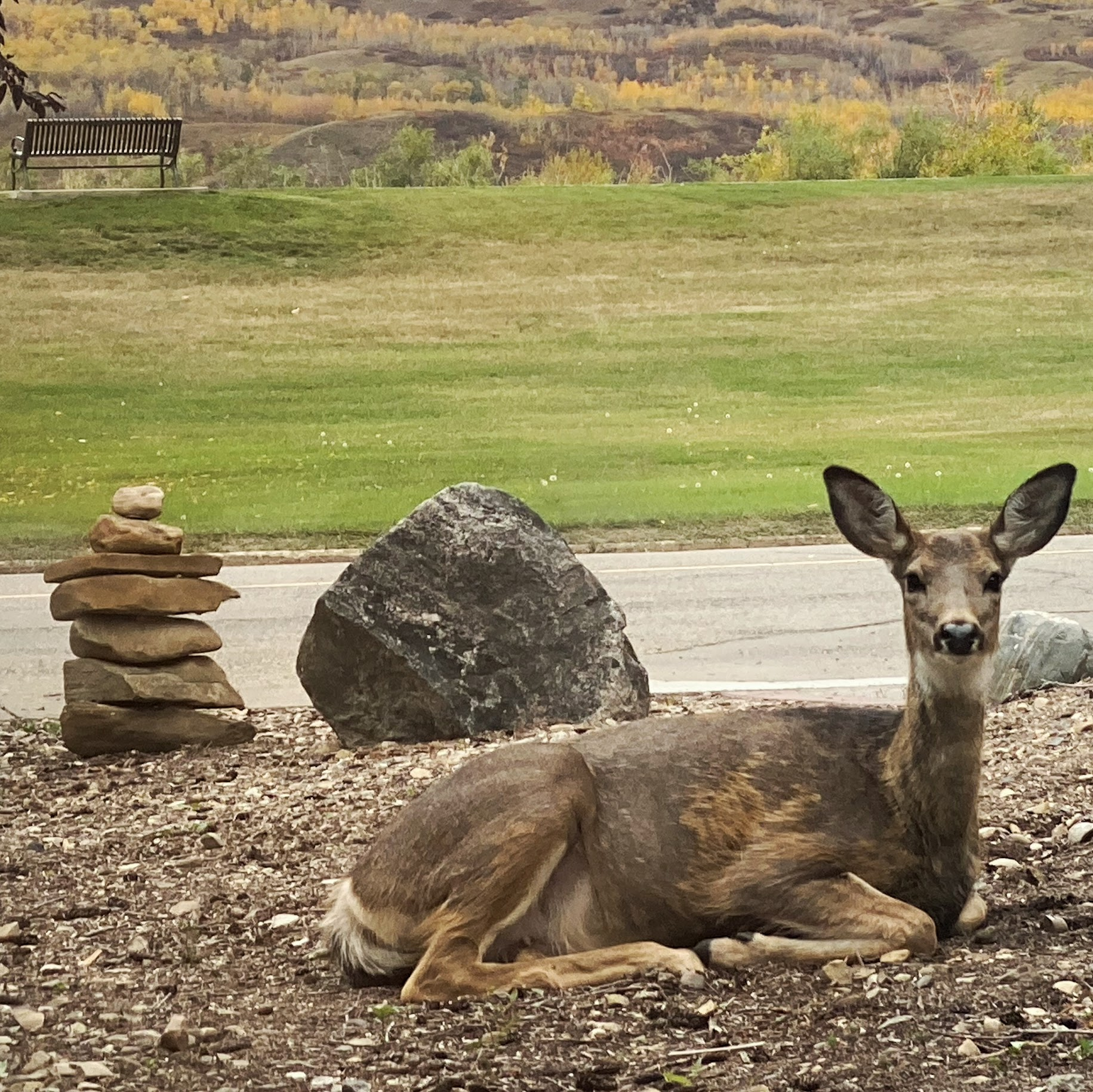
Doe in September in Peace River, Alberta, Canada; between summer and winter coats

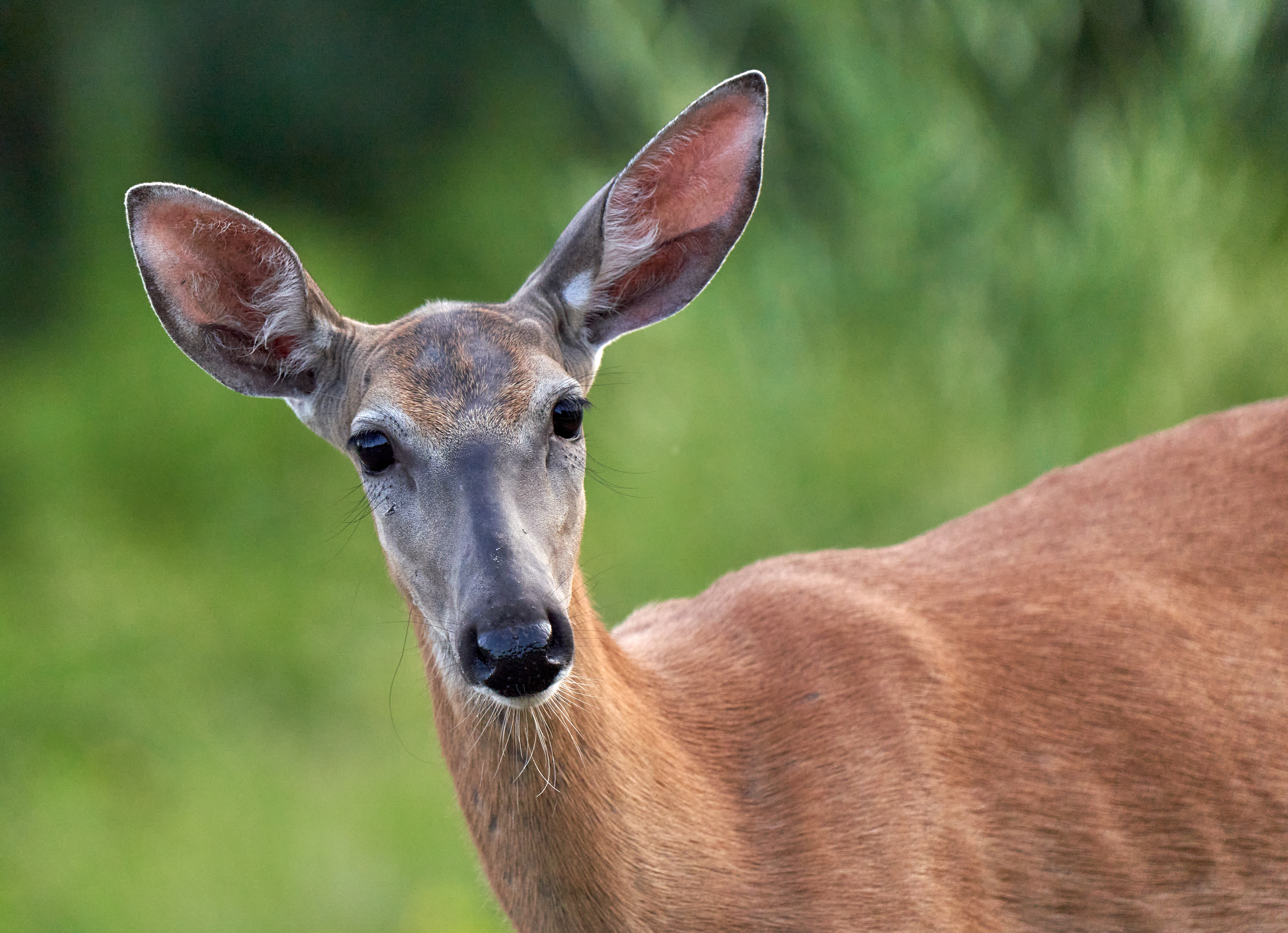
A portrait of a young female white-tailed deer

The white-tailed deer's coat is a reddish-brown in the spring and summer, and turns to a grey-brown throughout the fall and winter. The white-tailed deer can be recognized by the characteristic white underside to its tail. It raises its tail when it is alarmed to warn the predator that it has been detected.

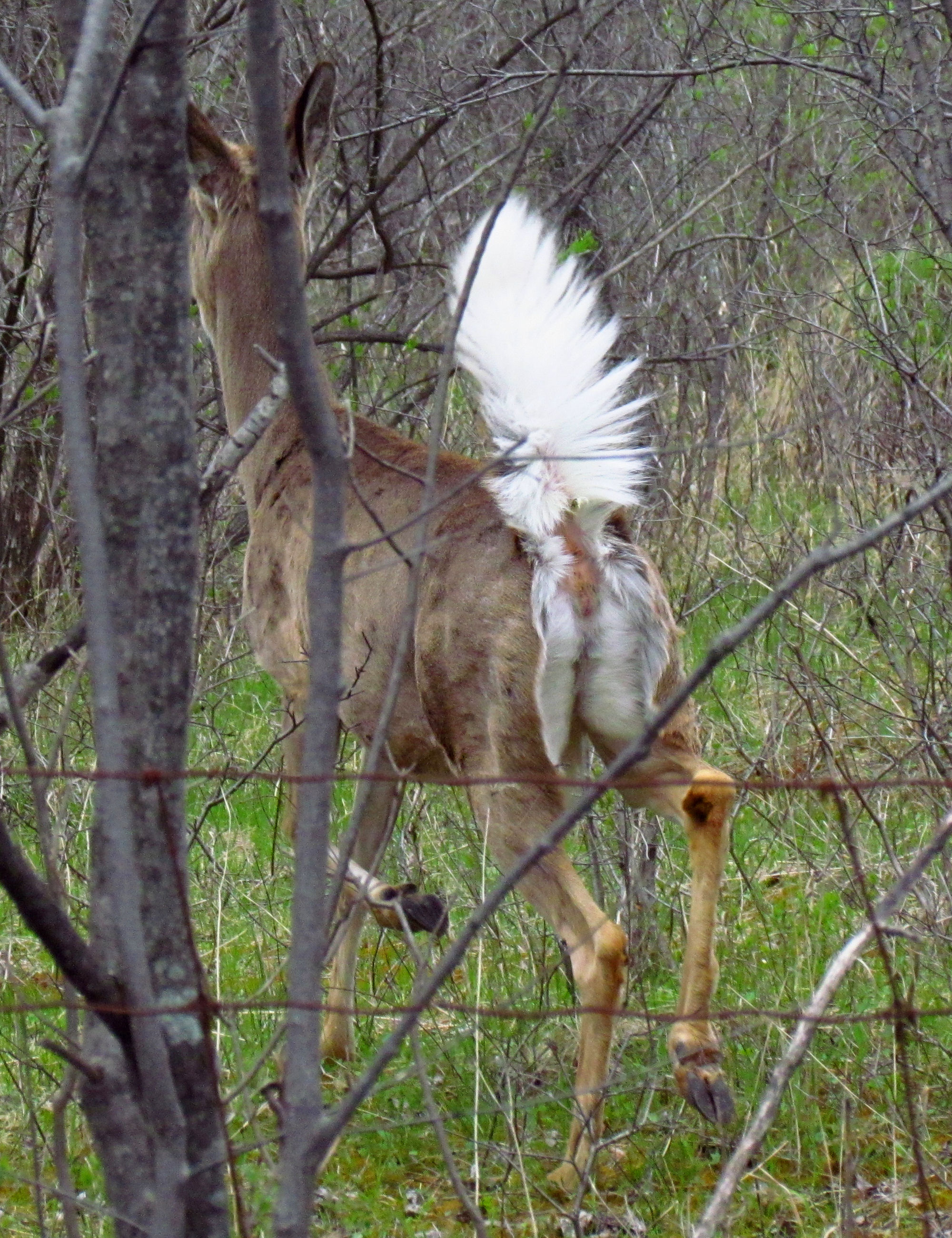
Female with tail in alarm posture

An indication of a deer's age is the length of the snout and the color of the coat, with older deer tending to have longer snouts and grayer coats.

A population of white-tailed deer in New York is entirely white except for the nose and hooves – not albino – in color. The former Seneca Army Depot in Romulus, New York, has the largest known concentration of white deer. Strong conservation efforts have allowed white deer to thrive within the confines of the depot.

The white-tailed deer's horizontally slit pupil allows for good night vision and color vision during the day. Whitetails process visual images at a much more rapid rate than humans and are better at detecting motion in low-light conditions.

=== Size and weight ===
The white-tailed deer is highly variable in size, generally following both Allen's rule and Bergmann's rule that the average size is larger farther away from the equator. North American male deer (bucks) usually weigh 68 to 136 kg (150 to 300 lb), but mature bucks over 180 kg (400 lb) have been recorded in the northernmost reaches of their native range, namely Minnesota, Ontario, and Manitoba. In 1926, Carl J. Lenander Jr. took a white-tailed buck near Tofte, Minnesota, that weighed 183 kg (403 lb) after it was field-dressed (internal organs and blood removed) and was estimated at 232 kg (511 lb) when alive. The female (doe) in North America usually weighs from 40 to 90 kg (88 to 198 lb). White-tailed deer from the tropics and the Florida Keys are markedly smaller-bodied than temperate populations, averaging 35 to 50 kg (77 to 110 lb), with an occasional adult female as small as 25 kg (55 lb). White-tailed deer from the Andes are larger than other tropical deer of this species and have thick, slightly woolly-looking fur. Length ranges from 95 to 220 cm (37 to 87 in), including a tail of 10 to 37 cm (4 to 15 in), and the shoulder height is 53 to 120 cm (21 to 47 in). Including all races, the average summer weight of adult males is 68 kg (150 lb) and is 45 kg (100 lb) in adult females. It is among the largest deer species in North America, and is also one of the largest in South America, behind only the marsh deer.

Deer have dichromatic (two-color) vision with blue and yellow primaries; humans normally have trichromatic vision. Thus, deer poorly distinguish the oranges and reds that stand out so well to humans. This makes it very convenient to use deer-hunter orange as a safety color on caps and clothing to avoid accidental shootings during hunting seasons.

=== Antlers ===
Males regrow their antlers every year. About one in 10,000 females also has antlers, although this is usually associated with freemartinism. Bucks without branching antlers are often termed "spikehorn", "spiked bucks", "spike bucks", or simply "spikes/spikers". The spikes can be quite long or very short. Length and branching of antlers are determined by nutrition, age, and genetics. Rack growth tends to be very important from late spring until about a month before velvet sheds. Healthy deer in some areas that are well fed can have eight-point branching antlers as yearlings (1.5 years old). Although antler size typically increases with age, antler characteristics (e.g., number of points, length, or thickness of the antlers) are not good indicators of buck age, in general, because antler development is influenced by the local environment. The individual deer's nutritional needs for antler growth is dependent on the diet of the deer, particularly protein intake. Good antler-growth nutritional needs (calcium) and good genetics combine to produce wall trophies in some of their range. Spiked bucks are different from "button bucks" or "nubbin' bucks", that are male fawns and are generally about six to nine months of age during their first winter. They have skin-covered nobs on their heads. They can have bony protrusions up to 10 mm (1/2 in) in length, but that is very rare, and they are not the same as spikes.

Antlers begin to grow in late spring, covered with a highly vascularised tissue known as velvet. Bucks either have a typical or atypical antler arrangement. Typical antlers are symmetrical, and the points grow straight up from the main beam. Atypical antlers are asymmetrical, and the points may project at any angle from the main beam. These descriptions are not the only limitations for typical and atypical antler arrangement. The Boone and Crockett or Pope and Young scoring systems also define relative degrees of typicality and atypicality by procedures to measure what proportion of the antlers is asymmetrical. Therefore, bucks with only slight asymmetry are scored as "typical". A buck's inside spread can be from 8–60 cm (3–25 in). Bucks shed their antlers when all females have been bred, from late December to February.

== Ecology ==
White-tailed deer are generalists and can adapt to a wide variety of habitats. The largest deer occur in the temperate regions of North America. The northern white-tailed deer (O. v. borealis), Dakota white-tailed deer (O. v. dacotensis), and northwest white-tailed deer (O. v. ochrourus) are some of the largest animals, with large antlers. The smallest deer occur in the Florida Keys and in partially wooded lowlands in the Neotropics.

Although most often thought of as forest animals depending on relatively small openings and edges, white-tailed deer can equally adapt themselves to life in more open prairie, savanna woodlands, and sage communities as in the Southwestern United States and northern Mexico. These savanna-adapted deer have relatively large antlers in proportion to their body size and large tails. Also, a noticeable difference exists in size between male and female deer of the savannas. The Texas white-tailed deer (O. v. texanus), of the prairies and oak savannas of Texas and parts of Mexico, are the largest savanna-adapted deer in the Southwest, with impressive antlers that might rival deer found in Canada and the northern United States. Populations of Arizona (O. v. couesi) and Carmen Mountains (O. v. carminis) white-tailed deer inhabit montane mixed oak and pine woodland communities. The Arizona and Carmen Mountains deer are smaller, but may also have impressive antlers, considering their size. The white-tailed deer of the Llanos region of Colombia and Venezuela (O. v. apurensis and O. v. gymnotis) have antler dimensions similar to the Arizona white-tailed deer.

In some western regions of North America the white-tailed deer range overlaps with those of the mule deer. White-tail incursions in the Trans-Pecos region of Texas have resulted in some hybrids. In the extreme north of the range, their habitat is also used by moose in some areas. White-tailed deer may occur in areas that are also exploited by elk (wapiti) such as in mixed deciduous river valley bottomlands and formerly in the mixed deciduous forest of eastern United States. In places such as Glacier National Park in Montana and several national parks in the Columbian Mountains (Mount Revelstoke National Park) and Canadian Rocky Mountains, as well as in the Yukon Territory (Yoho National Park and Kootenay National Park), white-tailed deer are shy and more reclusive than the coexisting mule deer, elk and moose.

Central American white-tailed deer prefer tropical and subtropical dry broadleaf forests, seasonal mixed deciduous forests, savanna, and adjacent wetland habitats over dense tropical and subtropical moist broadleaf forests. South American subspecies of white-tailed deer live in two types of environment. The first type, similar to the Central American deer, consists of savannas, dry deciduous forests, and riparian corridors that cover much of Venezuela and eastern Colombia. The other type is the higher elevation mountain grassland/mixed forest ecozones in the Andes Mountains, from Venezuela to Peru. The Andean white-tailed deer seem to retain gray coats due to the colder weather at high altitudes, whereas the lowland savanna forms retain the reddish brown coats. South American white-tailed deer, like those in Central America, also generally avoid dense moist broadleaf forests.

Since the second half of the 19th century, white-tailed deer have been introduced to Europe. A population in the Brdy area remains stable today. In 1935, white-tailed deer were introduced to Finland. The introduction was successful, and the deer began spreading through northern Scandinavia and southern Karelia, competing with, and sometimes displacing, native species. The 2020 population of some 109,000 deer originated from four animals provided by Finnish Americans from Minnesota.

=== Diet ===
White-tailed deer eat large amounts of food, commonly eating legumes and foraging on other plants, including shoots, leaves, cacti (in deserts), prairie forbs, and grasses. They also eat acorns, fruit, and corn. Their multi-chambered stomachs allow them to eat some foods humans cannot, such as mushrooms (even those that are toxic to humans) and poison ivy. Their diets vary by season according to the availability of food sources. They also eat hay, grass, white clover, and other foods they can find in a farmyard. Though almost entirely herbivorous, white-tailed deer have been known to opportunistically feed on nesting songbirds, field mice, and birds trapped in mist nets, if the need arises. When additional amounts of minerals such as calcium are needed in their diet, they can resort to osteophagy, chewing on bones of dead animals. A grown deer can eat around 900 kg (2,000 lb) of vegetable matter annually. A population of around 8 deer per square kilometre (20 /sq mi) can start to destroy the forest environment in their foraging area.

Their diet consists mostly of woody shoots, stems, and leaves of woody plants as well as grasses, cultivated crops, nuts, berries, and wildflowers. The items they feed on are not generally abundant in mature forests and are mostly found at "edges". Edges are described as a "mosaic of vegetation types that create numerous interwoven 'edges' where their respective boundaries intersect" and provide optimum cover for browsers such as the white-tailed deer. White-tailed deer can easily thrive in suburban areas, as a combination of increased safety from some predators (including human hunting), high quality and abundance of foods in home gardens, city parks, open farmland, and other factors all create landscapes with an abundance of edge habitat.

The white-tailed deer is a ruminant, which means it has a four-chambered stomach. Each chamber has a different and specific function that allows the deer to eat a variety of different foods, digesting it at a later time in a safe area of cover. The stomach hosts a complex set of microbes that change as the deer's diet changes through the seasons. If the microbes necessary for digestion of a particular food (e.g., hay) are absent, it will not be digested. Utilizing foregut fermentation, the fermented ingesta (known as cud) is regurgitated and chewed again, to mix it with saliva and reduce the particle size. Smaller particle size allows for increased nutrient absorption and the saliva is important because it provides liquid for the microbial population, recirculates nitrogen and minerals, and acts as a buffer for the rumen pH.

=== Predators ===
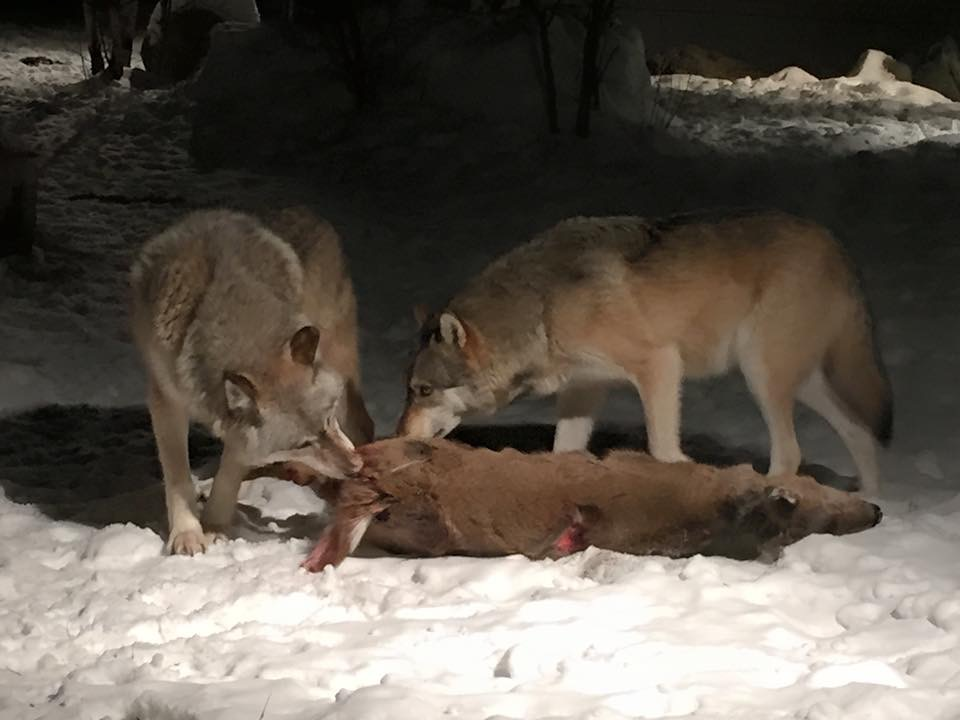
Wolves with a white-tailed deer carcass

There are several natural predators of white-tailed deer, with wolves, cougars, American alligators, jaguars (in the American southwest, Mexico, and Central and South America) and humans being the most effective natural predators. Aside from humans, these predators frequently pick out easily caught young or infirm deer (which is believed to improve the genetic stock of a population), but can and do take healthy adults of any size. Bobcats, Canada lynx, grizzly and American black bears, wolverines, and packs of coyotes usually prey mainly on fawns. Bears may sometimes attack adult deer, while lynxes, coyotes, and wolverines are most likely to take adult deer when the ungulates are weakened by harsh winter weather. Many scavengers rely on deer as carrion, including New World vultures, raptors, red and gray foxes, and corvids. Few wild predators can afford to be picky and any will readily consume deer as carrion. Records exist of American crows and common ravens attempting to prey on white-tailed deer fawns by pecking around their face and eyes, though no accounts of success are given. Occasionally, both golden and bald eagles may capture deer fawns with their talons. In one case, a golden eagle was filmed in Illinois unsuccessfully trying to prey on a large mature white-tailed deer.

White-tailed deer typically respond to the presence of potential predators by breathing very heavily (also called blowing) and fleeing. When they blow, the sound alerts other deer in the area. As they run, the flash of their white tails warns other deer. This especially serves to warn fawns when their mother is alarmed. Most natural predators of white-tailed deer hunt by ambush, although canids may engage in an extended chase, hoping to exhaust the prey. Felids typically try to suffocate the deer by biting the throat. Cougars and jaguars will initially knock the deer off balance with their powerful forelegs, whereas the smaller bobcats and lynxes will jump astride the deer to deliver a killing bite. In the case of canids and wolverines, the predators bite at the limbs and flanks, hobbling the deer, until they can reach vital organs and kill it through loss of blood. Bears, which usually target fawns, often simply knock down the prey and then start eating it while it is still alive. Alligators snatch deer as they try to drink from or cross bodies of water, grabbing them with their powerful jaws and dragging them into the water to drown.

Most primary natural predators of white-tailed deer have been essentially extirpated in eastern North America, with a very small number of reintroduced critically endangered red wolves, around North Carolina and a small remnant population of Florida panthers, a subspecies of the cougar. Gray wolves, the leading cause of deer mortality where they overlap, co-occur with whitetails in northern Minnesota, Wisconsin, Michigan, and most of Canada. The abundant deer population has helped play a role in the healthy recovery of the Great Lakes wolf population. Coyotes, widespread and with a rapidly expanding population, are often the only major nonhuman predator of the species in the Eastern U.S., besides an occasional domestic dog. In some areas, American black bears are also significant predators. In north-central Pennsylvania, black bears were found to be nearly as common predators of fawns as coyotes. Bobcats, still fairly widespread, usually only exploit deer as prey when smaller prey is scarce. Discussions have occurred regarding the possible reintroduction of gray wolves and cougars to sections of the eastern United States, largely because of the apparent controlling effect they have through deer predation on local ecosystems, as has been illustrated in the reintroduction of wolves to Yellowstone National Park and their controlling effect on previously overpopulated elk. However, due to the heavy urban development in much of the Eastern U.S., and fear for livestock and human lives, such ideas have ultimately been rejected by local communities and/or by government services and have not been carried through.

White-tailed deer can jump very far.

White-tailed deer can run faster than their predators and have been recorded sprinting at speeds of 60 km (40 mi) per hour and sustaining speeds of 50 km (30 mi) per hour over distances of 5–6 km (3–4 mi); this ranks them amongst the fastest of all deer, alongside the Eurasian roe deer. They can also jump 3 m (9 ft) high and up to 9 m (30 ft) forward. When shot at, a white-tailed deer will run at high speeds with its tail down. If frightened, the deer will hop in a zig-zag with its tail straight up. If the deer feels extremely threatened, however, it may choose to attack, charging the person or predator posing the threat, using its antlers or, if none are present, its head to fight off its target.

=== Forest alteration ===
In certain parts of eastern North America, high deer densities have caused large reductions in plant biomass, including the density and heights of certain forest wildflowers, tree seedlings, and shrubs. Although they can be seen as a nuisance species, white-tailed deer also play an important role in biodiversity. At the same time, increases in browse-tolerant grasses and sedges and unpalatable ferns have often accompanied intensive deer herbivory. Changes to the structure of forest understories have, in turn, altered the composition and abundance of forest bird communities in some areas. In regions of intermediate density, deer activity has also been shown to increase herbaceous plant diversity, particularly in disturbed areas, by reducing competitively dominant plants; and to increase the growth rates of important canopy trees, perhaps by increased nutrient inputs into the soil.

In northeastern hardwood forests, high-density deer populations affect plant succession, particularly following clear-cuts and patch cuts. In succession without deer, annual herbs and woody plants are followed by commercially valuable, shade-tolerant oak and maple. The shade-tolerant trees prevent the invasion of less commercial cherry and American beech, which are stronger nutrient competitors, but not as shade tolerant. Although deer eat shade-tolerant plants and acorns, this is not the only way deer can shift the balance in favor of nutrient competitors. Deer consuming earlier-succession plants allows in enough light for nutrient competitors to invade. Since slow-growing oaks need several decades to develop root systems sufficient to compete with faster-growing species, removal of the canopy prior to that point amplifies the effect of deer on succession. High-density deer populations possibly could browse eastern hemlock seedlings out of existence in northern hardwood forests; however, this scenario seems unlikely, given that deer browsing is not considered the critical factor preventing hemlock re-establishment at large scales.

Ecologists have also expressed concern over the facilitative effect high deer populations have on invasions of exotic plant species. In a study of eastern hemlock forests, browsing by white-tailed deer caused populations of three exotic plants to rise faster than they do in the areas which are absent of deer. Seedlings of the three invading species rose exponentially with deer density, while the most common native species fell exponentially with deer density, because deer were preferentially eating the native species. The effects of deer on the invasive and native plants were magnified in cases of canopy disturbance.

=== Population and controls ===
The white-tailed deer population in North America has declined by several million since 2000, but as of 2017 is considered healthy and is approximately equal to the historical pre-colonization white-tailed population on the continent. The species has rebounded considerably after being overhunted nearly to extinction in the late 1800s and very early 1900s. By contrast, the species' closest cousins (blacktail deer and mule deer) have seen their populations cut by more than half in North America after peaking in 1960 and have never regained their pre-colonization numbers. In the 21st century, the loss of natural predators has been more than offset by the ongoing loss of natural habitat to human development, and changes to logging operations.

Several methods have been developed to curb the population of white-tailed deer in suburban areas where they are perceived as overabundant, and these can be separated into lethal and nonlethal strategies. Most common in the U.S. is the use of extended hunting as population control, as well as a way to provide meat for humans. In Maryland and many other states, a state agency sets regulations on bag limits and hunting in the area depending on the deer population levels assessed. Hunting seasons may fluctuate in duration, or restrictions may be set to affect how many deer or what type of deer can be hunted in certain regions. For the 2015–2016 white-tailed deer-hunting season, some areas allowed only the hunting of antlerless white-tailed deer. These included young bucks and females, which encouraged the culling of does, aiding in population control.

A more targeted yet more expensive removal strategy than public hunting is a method referred to as sharpshooting. Sharpshooting can be an option when the area inhabited by the deer is unfit for public hunting. This strategy may work in areas close to human populations, since it is done by professional marksmen, and requires a submitted plan of action to the city with details of the time and location of the action, as well as number of deer to be culled. Another controversial method involves trapping the deer in a net or other trap, and then administering a chemical euthanizing agent or extermination by firearm. A main issue in questioning the humaneness of this method is the stress that the deer endure while trapped and awaiting extermination.

Nonlethal methods include contraceptive injections, sterilization, and translocation of deer. While lethal methods have municipal support as being the most effective in the short term, some opponents of this view suggest that extermination has no significant impact on deer populations. Opponents of contraceptive methods point out that fertility control cannot provide meat and proves ineffective over time as populations in open-field systems move about. Concerns are voiced that the contraceptives have not been adequately researched for the effect they could have on humans. Fertility control also does nothing to affect the current population and the effects their grazing may be having on the forest plant make-up.

Translocation has been considered overly costly for the little benefit it provides. Deer experience high stress and are at high risk of dying in the process, putting into question its humaneness. Another concern regarding translocation is the possible spreading of chronic wasting disease to unaffected deer populations and concerns about exposure to human populations.

In addition to the danger of deer-vehicle collisions the National Agricultural Statistics Service (NASS) reported that the estimated loss in field crops, nuts, fruits, and vegetables in 2001 was near $765 million (equivalent to $1.33 billion in 2025).

== Behavior ==
Males compete for the opportunity to breed with females, with sparring among males determining a dominance hierarchy. Bucks attempt to copulate with as many females as possible, gradually losing physical condition since they rarely eat or rest during the rut. The general geographical trend is for the rut to be shorter in duration at increased latitude. Many factors determine how intense the "rutting season" will be; air temperature is a major one. Any time the temperature rises above 4 °C (40 °F), the males do much less traveling looking for females, else they will be subject to overheating or dehydrating. Another factor for the strength of rutting activity is competition. If numerous males are in a particular area, then they compete more for the females. If fewer males or more females are present, then the selection process will not need to be as competitive.

=== Reproduction ===
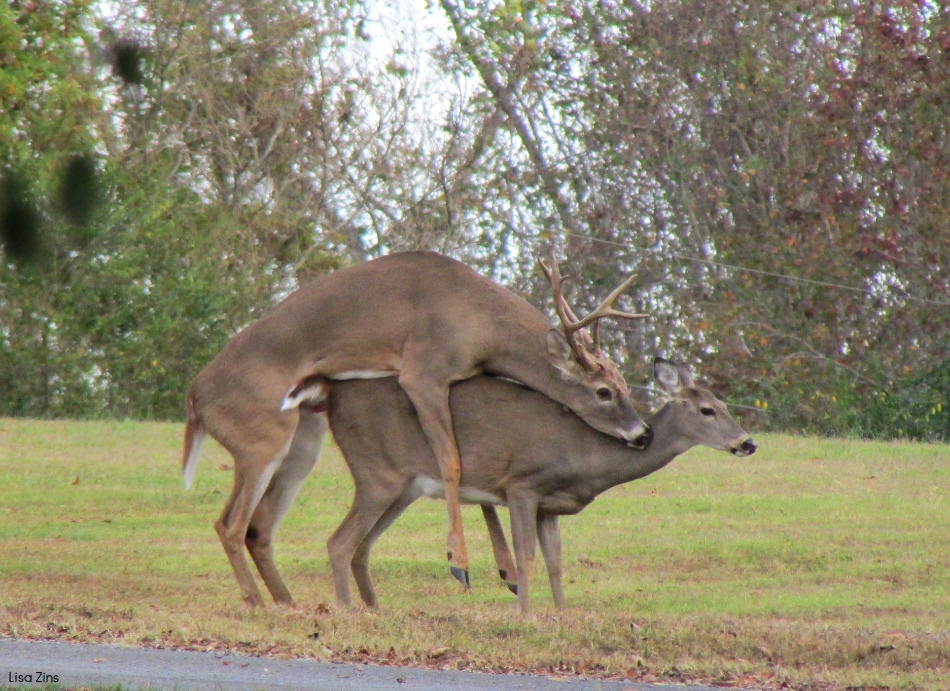
Male white-tailed deer mounting a female

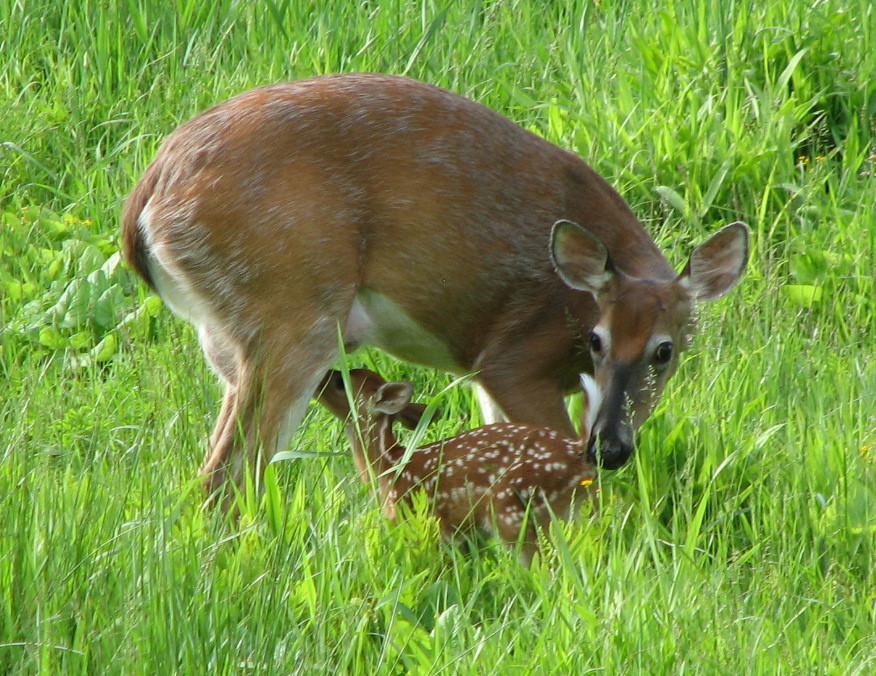
Female white-tailed deer with fawn

Females enter estrus, colloquially called the rut, in the autumn, normally in late October or early November, triggered mainly by the declining photoperiod. Sexual maturation of females depends on population density, as well as the availability of food. Young females often flee from an area heavily populated with males. Some does may be as young as six months when they reach sexual maturity, but the average age of maturity is 18 months. Copulation consists of a brief copulatory jump.

Females give birth to one to three spotted young, known as fawns, in mid-to-late spring, generally in May or June. Fawns lose their spots during the first summer and weigh from 20 to 35 kg (44 to 77 lb) by the first winter. Male fawns tend to be slightly larger and heavier than females. For the first four weeks, fawns are hidden in vegetation by their mothers, who nurse them four to five times a day. This strategy keeps scent levels low to avoid predators. After about a month, the fawns are then able to follow their mothers on foraging trips. They are usually weaned after 8–10 weeks, but cases have been seen where mothers have continued to allow nursing long after the fawns have lost their spots (for several months, or until the end of fall) as seen by rehabilitators and other studies. Males leave their mothers after a year and females leave after two.

Bucks are generally sexually mature at 1.5 years old and begin to breed even in populations stacked with older bucks.

=== Communication ===
White-tailed deer have many forms of communication involving sounds, scent, body language, and marking. In addition to the blowing in the presence of danger, all white-tailed deer can produce audible noises unique to each animal. Fawns release a high-pitched squeal, known as a bleat, to call out to their mothers. This bleat deepens as the fawn grows until it becomes the grunt of the mature deer, a guttural sound that attracts the attention of any other deer in the area. A doe makes maternal grunts when searching for her bedded fawns. Bucks also grunt, at a pitch lower than that of the doe; this grunt deepens as the buck matures. In addition to grunting, both does and bucks also snort, a sound that often signals an imminent threat. Mature bucks also produce a grunt-snort-wheeze pattern, unique to each animal, that asserts its dominance, aggression, and hostility. White-tailed deer also use "tail-flagging", a behavior where the tail is raised when they detect a threat. However, the function of this behavior is disputed, and it appears to be a signal to predators more than an intraspecific communication warning other deer.

=== Marking ===
White-tailed deer possess many glands that allow them to produce scents, some of which are so potent they can be detected by the human nose. Four major glands are the preorbital, forehead, tarsal, and metatarsal glands. Secretions from the preorbital glands (in front of the eye) were thought to be rubbed on tree branches, but research suggests this is not so. Scent from the forehead or sudoriferous glands (found on the head, between the antlers and eyes) is used to deposit scent on branches that overhang scrapes (areas scraped by the deer's front hooves before rub-urination). The tarsal glands are found on the upper inside of the hock (middle joint) on each hind leg. The scent is deposited from these glands when deer walk through and rub against vegetation. These scrapes are used by bucks as a sort of "sign-post" by which bucks know which other bucks are in the area, and to let does know a buck is regularly passing through the area—for breeding purposes. The scent from the metatarsal glands, found on the outside of each hind leg, between the ankle and hooves, may be used as an alarm scent. The scent from the interdigital glands, which are located between the hooves of each foot, emit a yellow waxy substance with an offensive odor. Deer can be seen stomping their hooves if they sense danger through sight, sound, or smell; this action leaves an excessive amount of odor for warning other deer of possible danger.

A doe rub-urinating

Throughout the year, deer rub-urinate, a process during which a deer squats while urinating so the urine will run down the insides of the deer's legs, over the tarsal glands, and onto the hair covering these glands. Bucks rub-urinate more frequently during the breeding season. Secretions from the preputial glands and tarsal glands mix with the urine and bacteria to produce a strong-smelling odor. During the breeding season, does release hormones and pheromones that tell bucks a doe is in heat and able to breed. Bucks also rub trees and shrubs with their antlers and heads during the breeding season, possibly transferring scent from the forehead glands to the tree, leaving a scent other deer can detect.

Sign-post marking (scrapes and rubs) is a very obvious way white-tailed deer communicate. Although bucks do most of the marking, does visit these locations often. To make a rub, a buck uses his antlers to strip the bark off small-diameter trees, helping to mark his territory and polish his antlers. To mark areas they regularly pass through, bucks make scrapes. Often occurring in patterns known as scrape lines, scrapes are areas where a buck has used his front hooves to expose bare earth. They often rub-urinate into these scrapes, which are often found under twigs that have been marked with scent from the forehead glands.

== Hunting ==
White-tailed deer have long been hunted as game, for pure sport and for their commodities, and is probably the most hunted native big game species in the Americas. In Mesoamerica, white-tailed deer (Odocoileus virginianus) were hunted from very early times. Rites and rituals in preparation for deer hunting and celebration for an auspicious hunt are still practiced in the area today. Ancient hunters ask their gods for permission to hunt, and some deer rites take place in caves.

Venison, or deer meat, is a nutritious form of lean animal protein that a deer will yield once it has been killed and processed. In modern times, wild venison is particularly sustainable in areas where deer populations are very high and hunting can be used as a method to control them.

In 1884, one of the first hunts of white-tailed deer in Europe was conducted in Opočno and Dobříš (Brdy Mountains area), in what is now the Czech Republic. In the same era, white-tailed deer were hunted to near extinction in North America, but numbers have since rebounded to approximate pre-colonization levels. In the United States, whitetail hunting is far more popular in some states than others. The top five states for whitetail hunter concentrations are all in the Northeast and Midwest (Pennsylvania, Rhode Island, New York, Wisconsin, and Ohio). The Northeast in particular has twice the hunter density of the Midwest and Southeast and ten times that of the West.

Since whitetail deer are very adaptable, inhabiting diverse regions ranging from tropical rain forests to high-altitude mountain chains of the Andes Mountains at more than 13,000 feet, different hunting methods as well as types of guns and ammo may be used. Most common cartridges used include the .243 Winchester, .308 Winchester, .25-06 Remington, 6.5mm Creedmoor, .270 Winchester, 7mm Remington Magnum, .30-06 Springfield, .30-30 Winchester (.30 WCF), .300 Winchester Magnum and 12 gauge shotshells. Due to the whitetail deer's frame and weight, cup and core bullets are the most recommended for taking clean, ethical shots.

Hunting is a tool that can be used for controlling the whitetail deer population in areas that may not have a strong predator presence and where local ecosystems may be negatively effected by overgrazing.

== Human interactions ==
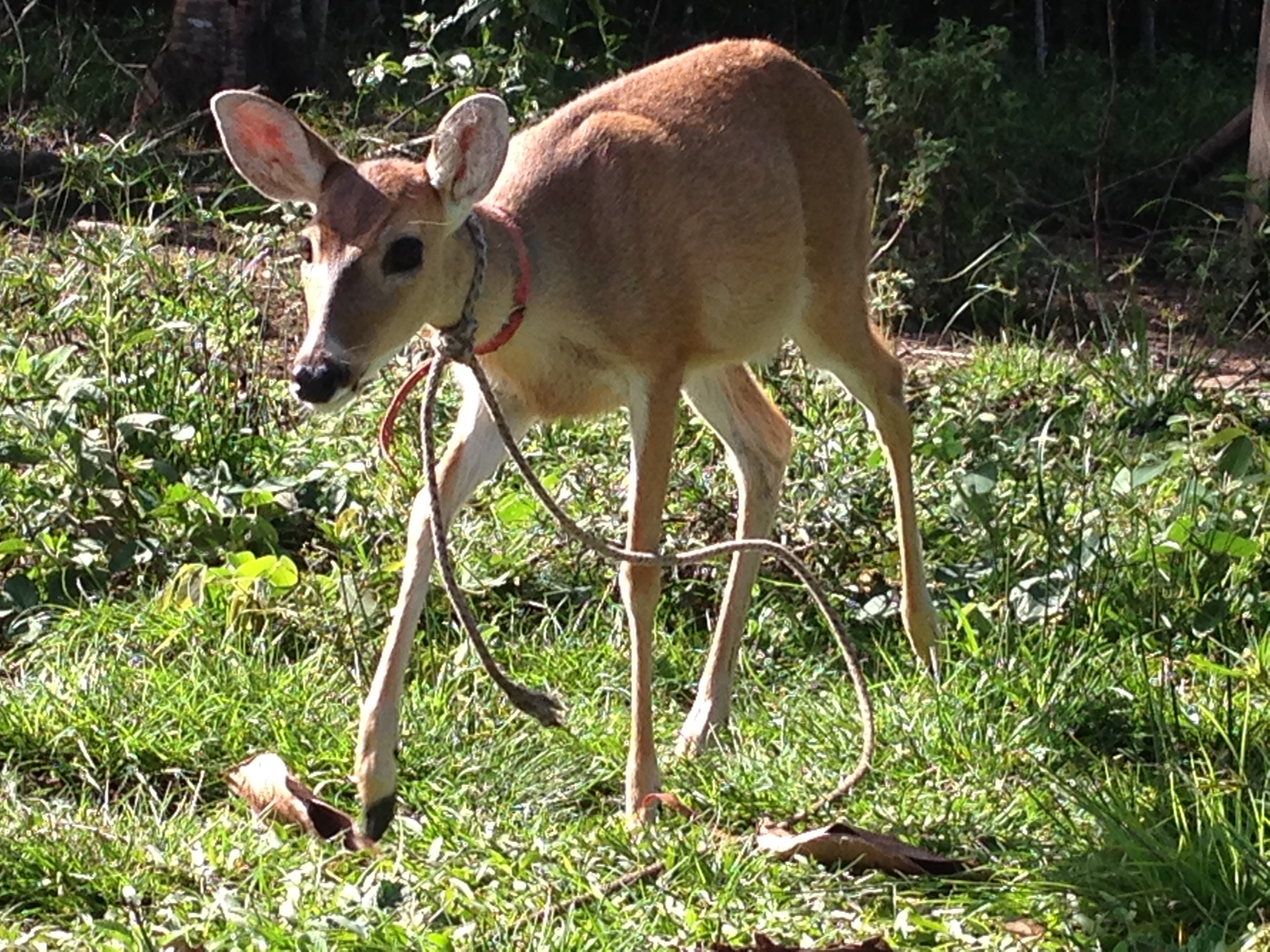
Fawn being kept as a pet in a farm near Cumaral, Colombia

By the early 20th century, commercial exploitation and unregulated hunting had severely depressed deer populations in much of their range. For example, by about 1930, the U.S. population was thought to number about 300,000. After an outcry by hunters and conservation ecologists, commercial exploitation of deer became illegal and conservation programs along with regulated hunting were introduced. In 2005, estimates put the deer population in the United States at around 30 million. Conservation practices have proved so successful, in parts of their range, the white-tailed deer populations currently far exceed their cultural carrying capacity and the animal may be considered a nuisance. A reduction in non-human predators (which normally cull young, sick, or infirm specimens) has also contributed to locally abundant populations.

At high population densities, farmers can suffer economic damage from deer feeding on cash crops, especially in corn and orchards. It has become nearly impossible to grow some crops in some areas unless very burdensome deer-deterring measures are taken. Deer can easily jump fences, and their fear of motion and sounds meant to scare them away is soon dulled. Timber harvesting and forest clearance have historically resulted in increased deer population densities, which in turn have slowed the rate of reforestation following logging in some areas. High densities of deer can have severe impacts on native plants and animals in parks and natural areas; however, deer browsing can also promote plant and animal diversity in some areas. Deer can also cause substantial damage to landscape plants in suburban areas, leading to limited hunting or trapping to relocate or sterilize them. In parts of the Eastern US with high deer populations and fragmented woodlands, deer often wander into suburban and urban habitats that are less than ideal for the species.

=== Farming ===
Deer farming has expanded into a substantial livestock sector, supplying venison, velvet antlers, hides, and breeding stock. Deer are favored in production systems due to their high reproductive efficiency, climatic adaptability, and ability to utilize pasture that is unsuitable for conventional agriculture.

Producers face strict regulatory requirements to prevent farmed deer from mixing with wild populations. Many jurisdictions mandate tall, reinforced fencing, to reduce the risk of escape, disease transmission, and ecological disruption. High-density operations also require rigorous ecological and veterinary oversight, as unmanaged herds can damage vegetation, alter habitat structure, and increase the spread of diseases such as chronic wasting disease (CWD).

Most commercial operations fall into two categories:

- Breeding farms, which focus on genetics, herd improvement, and stock sales.
- Hunting ranches, which raise and manage animals for guided hunts and related recreational services.

Both models generate reliable income, supported by sustained demand for venison, specialty antler products, and wildlife-based recreation.

=== Deer–vehicle collisions ===
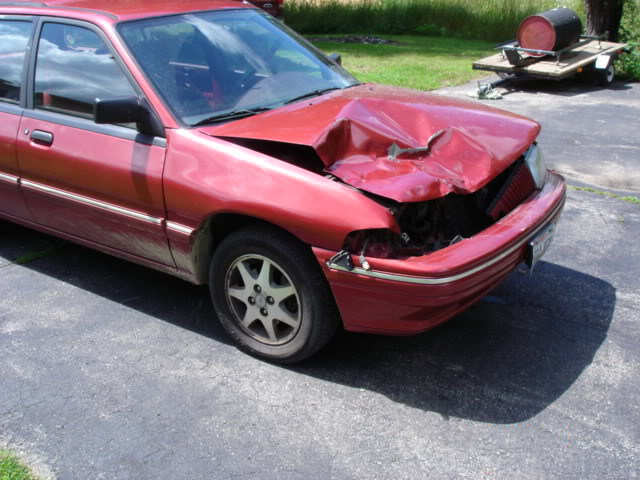
Car with major damage from striking a white-tailed deer in Wisconsin

Motor vehicle collisions with deer are a significant issue in many parts of their range, especially at night and during rutting season, causing injuries and fatalities among both deer and humans. Vehicular damage can be substantial in some cases. In the United States, such collisions increased from 200,000 in 1980 to 500,000 in 1991. By 2009, the insurance industry estimated 2.4 million deer–vehicle collisions had occurred over the past two years, estimating damage cost to be over 7 billion dollars and 300 human deaths. Despite the high rate of these accidents, the effect on deer density is still quite low. Vehicle collisions of deer were monitored for two years in Virginia, and the collective annual mortality did not surpass 20% of the estimated deer population.

Many techniques have been investigated to prevent roadside mortality. Fences or road under- or over- passes have been shown to decrease deer-vehicle collisions, but are expensive and difficult to implement on a large scale. Roadside habitat modifications could also successfully decrease the number of collisions along roadways. An essential procedure in understanding factors resulting in accidents is to quantify risks, which involves the driver's behavior in terms of safe speed and ability to observe the deer. Some have suggested that reducing speed limits during the winter months when deer density is exceptionally high would likely reduce deer-vehicle collisions, but this may be an impractical solution.

=== Diseases ===
Another issue that exists with high deer density is the spreading of infectious diseases. Increased deer populations lead to increased transmission of tick-borne diseases, which pose a threat to human health, to livestock, and to other deer. White-tailed deer are the primary host for the adult black-legged tick (Ixodes scapularis), which transmits the Lyme disease bacterium to humans. Lyme disease is the most common vector-borne disease in the country with confirmed cases, according to 2019 CDC data, in virtually every state in the U.S. with the highest incidence levels in the states from Maine to Virginia, Minnesota, and Wisconsin. In 2019 the number of confirmed and probable cases totaled about 35,000. Furthermore, the incidence of Lyme disease seems to reflect deer density in the eastern United States, which suggests a strong correlation. While deer are critical hosts for the tick life cycle, they are not susceptible to infection by the Lyme disease spirochete. The white-footed mouse (Peromyscus leucopus) is the most significant reservoir of Borrelia burgdorferi, the etiologic agent of Lyme disease. White-tailed deer also act as hosts for other medically significant tick vectors that transmit diseases including as Rocky Mountain spotted fever, Rickettsia parkeri rickettsiosis, and human monotropic ehrlichiosis.

==== SARS-CoV-2 ====
Blood samples gathered by USDA researchers in 2021 also showed that 40% of sampled white-tailed deer demonstrated evidence of SARS-CoV-2 antibodies, with the highest percentages in Michigan, at 67%, and Pennsylvania, at 44%. A later study by Penn State University and wildlife officials in Iowa showed that up to 80 percent of Iowa deer sampled from April 2020 through January 2021 had tested positive for active SARS-CoV-2 infection, rather than solely antibodies from prior infection. This data, confirmed by the National Veterinary Services Laboratory, alerted scientists to the possibility that white-tailed deer had become a natural reservoir for the coronavirus, serving as a potential "variant factory" for eventual retransmission back into humans. An Ohio State University study further showed that humans had transmitted SARS-CoV-2 to white-tailed deer on at least six separate occasions and that deer possessed six mutations that were uncommon in humans at the time of the study. Infected deer can shed virus via nasal secretions and feces for five to six days and frequently engage in activities conductive to viral spread, such as sniffing food intermingled with waste, nuzzling noses, polygamy, and the sharing of salt licks. Canadian researchers uncovered an entirely new SARS-CoV-2 variant within a November–December 2021 study of Ontario white-tailed deer. The new COVID variant had also infected a person who had close contact with local deer, potentially marking the first instance of deer-to-human transmission.

=== Cultural significance ===
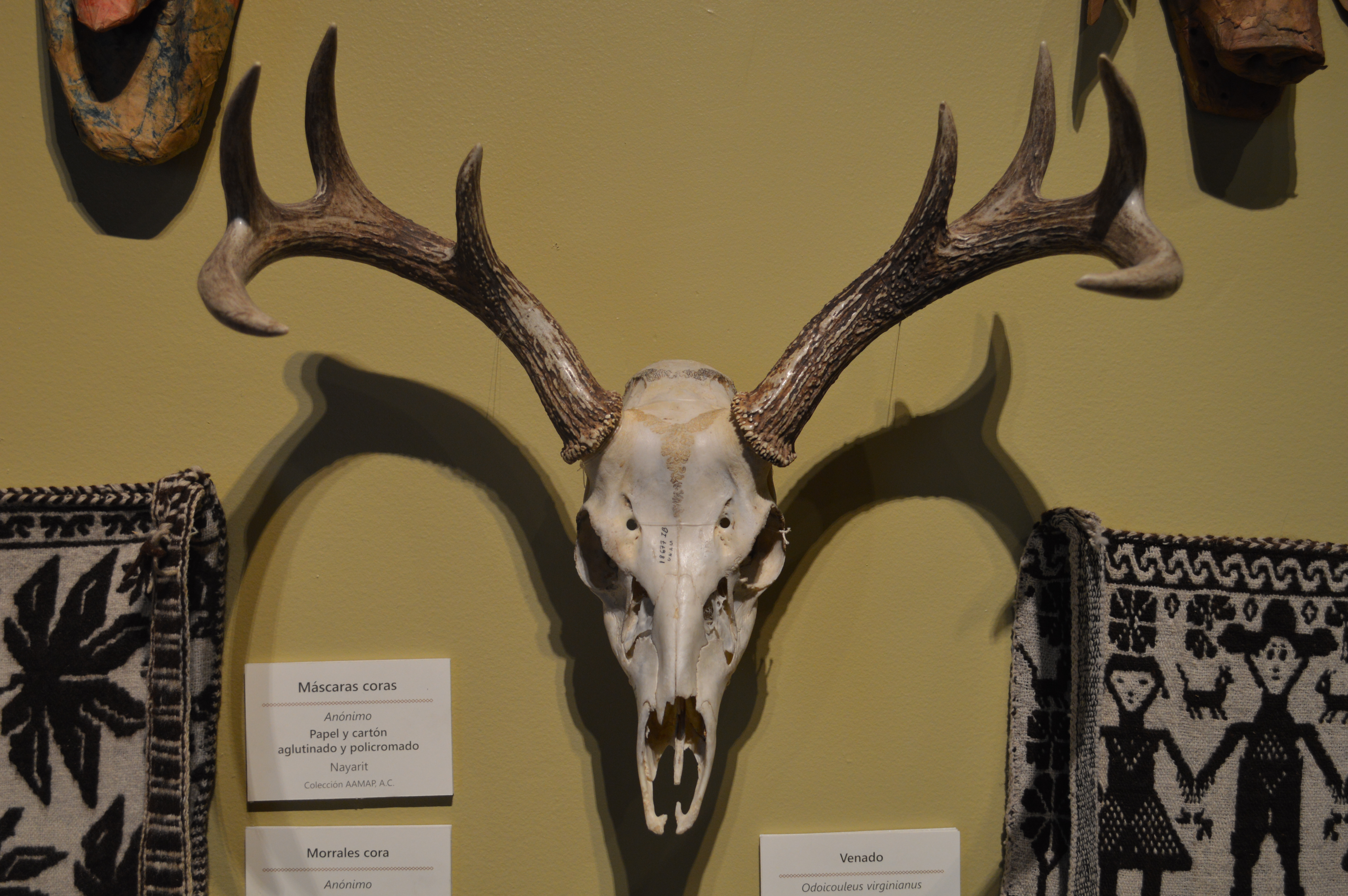
Odocoileus virginianus skull, part of an exhibition on the cultural artifacts of the Cora people of Western Mexico

In the U.S., the species is the state animal of Arkansas, Georgia, Illinois, Michigan, Mississippi, Nebraska, New Hampshire, Ohio, Pennsylvania, and South Carolina, the game animal of Oklahoma, and the wildlife symbol of Wisconsin. The white-tailed deer is also the inspiration of the professional basketball team the Milwaukee Bucks. The profile of a white-tailed deer buck caps the coat of arms of Vermont, is on the flag of Vermont, and is in stained glass at the Vermont State House. It is the national animal of Honduras and Costa Rica and the provincial animal of Canadian Saskatchewan and Finnish Pirkanmaa. It appears on the reverse side of the Costa Rican 1,000 colón note. The 1942 Disney film adaptation of Bambi, famously changed Bambi's species from the novel's roe deer into a white-tailed deer.

== Climate change ==
=== Migration patterns ===
Climate change is affecting the white-tailed deer by changing their migration patterns and increasing their population size. This species of deer is restricted from moving northward due to cold harsh winters. Consequently, as climate change warms up Earth, these deer are allowed to migrate further north which will result in the populations of the white-tailed deer increasing. Between 1980 and 2000 in a study by Dawe and Boutin, presence of white-tailed deer in Alberta, Canada, was driven primarily by changes in the climate. Populations of white-tailed deer have also moved anywhere from 50 to 250 km (31 to 155 mi) north of the eastern Alberta study site. Another study by Kennedy-Slaney, Bowman, Walpole, and Pond found that if current CO_{2} emissions remained the same, global warming resulting from the increased greenhouse gases in the atmosphere will allow white-tailed deer to survive further and further north by 2100.

=== Food web ===
When species are introduced to foreign ecosystems, they could potentially wreak havoc on the existing food web. For example, when the deer moved north in Alberta, gray wolf populations increased. This butterfly effect was also demonstrated in Yellowstone National Park when the rivers changed because wolves were re-introduced to the ecosystem. It is also possible that the increasing white-tailed deer populations could result in them becoming an invasive species for various plants in Alberta, Canada.

=== Disease ===
Deer are vulnerable to diseases that are more prevalent in the summer. Insects carrying these diseases like Lyme are usually killed during the first snowfall. However, as time goes on, they will be able to live longer than they used to meaning the deer are at higher risk of getting sick. It is possible that this will increase the deers' mortality rate from disease. Examples of these diseases are hemorrhagic disease (HD), epizootic hemorrhagic disease and bluetongue viruses, which are transmitted by biting midges. The hotter summers, longer droughts, and more intense rains create the perfect environment for the midges to thrive in. Ticks also thrive in warmer weather; heat results in faster development in all of their life stages. 18 different species of tick infest white-tailed deer in the United States alone. Ticks parasitic to white-tailed deer transmit diseases causing irritation, anemia, and infections.

=== Parasites ===
Deer are common definitive hosts of the parasite Parelaphostrongylus tenuis (also known as menigeal worm or brainworm) and Fascioloides magna (also known as giant liver fluke) and contribute to the spread of these parasites among the white-tailed deer population and other cervids. As the climate grows warmer and snow pack density decreases, more deer move into places like northern Minnesota, where the climate had previously been too harsh for a large population to thrive, and spread these parasites to the winter-hardy moose population.

Deer can host an adult brainworm parasite for many years, showing little to no symptoms of infection. Moose and other cervid species (like elk) are dead-end hosts for the brainworm parasite; where the parasite resides in the brain matter of these cervids and cause severe neurological disease. This parasite eventually causes death, or contributes to an increased likelihood of mortality via predation for dead-end hosts. Factors like infected deer density, climate, and temperature determine transmission levels of this parasite. A warming climate likely increases the rate of transmission due to the migration of deer into moose habitat and favorable weather conditions for transmission occurring more frequently. The 1854 Treaty Authority monitors the density of brainworm and giant liver fluke infection within the deer population of northeastern Minnesota, and uses this information to advise the Minnesota DNR when making management decisions in the 1854 Ceded Territory.

== See also ==
- Deer hunting
- Artiodactyla (list)
- James Jordan Buck
- Hole in the Horn Buck
