= South Atlantic Quarantine Station =

Coordinates: 31.5345°N 81.2036°W

The Southern Atlantic Quarantine Station was a US Navy quarantine facility located on Blackbeard Island, Georgia.

== History ==
The National Quarantine Act was instituted in 1878, resulting in other centers on the U.S. The Southern Atlantic Quarantine Station was created in 1880 by the US Navy and operated until 1910. Its purpose was to monitor shipping to several cities, the largest of which was Savannah Georgia. The main purpose was to prevent yellow fever, a mosquito-borne illness imported from tropical sources. 13 buildings were employed in the goal of disinfecting ships before proceeding to the mainland. The main disinfectant used was sulfur dioxide.
