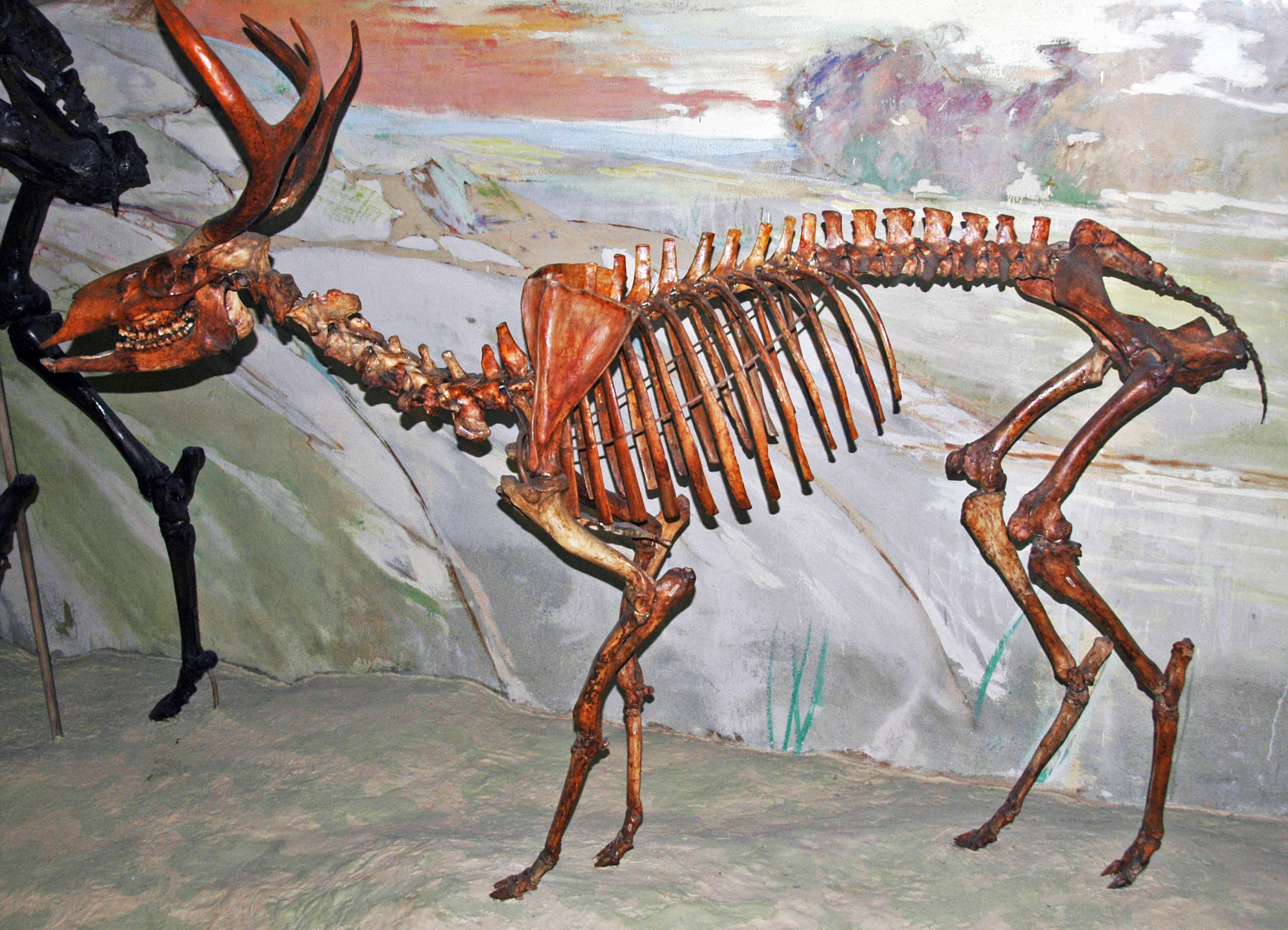
- Mounted skeleton

Scientific classification
- Kingdom: Animalia
- Phylum: Chordata
- Class: Mammalia
- Order: Artiodactyla
- Family: Cervidae
- Subfamily: Capreolinae
- Genus: Odocoileus
- Species: †O. lucasi

Binomial name
- †Odocoileus lucasi (Hay, 1927)

= American mountain deer =

American mountain deer Temporal range: Late Pleistocene

Extinct species of deer

Odocoileus lucasi (historically Navahoceros fricki), known commonly as the American mountain deer, is an extinct species of North American deer.

== Taxonomy ==
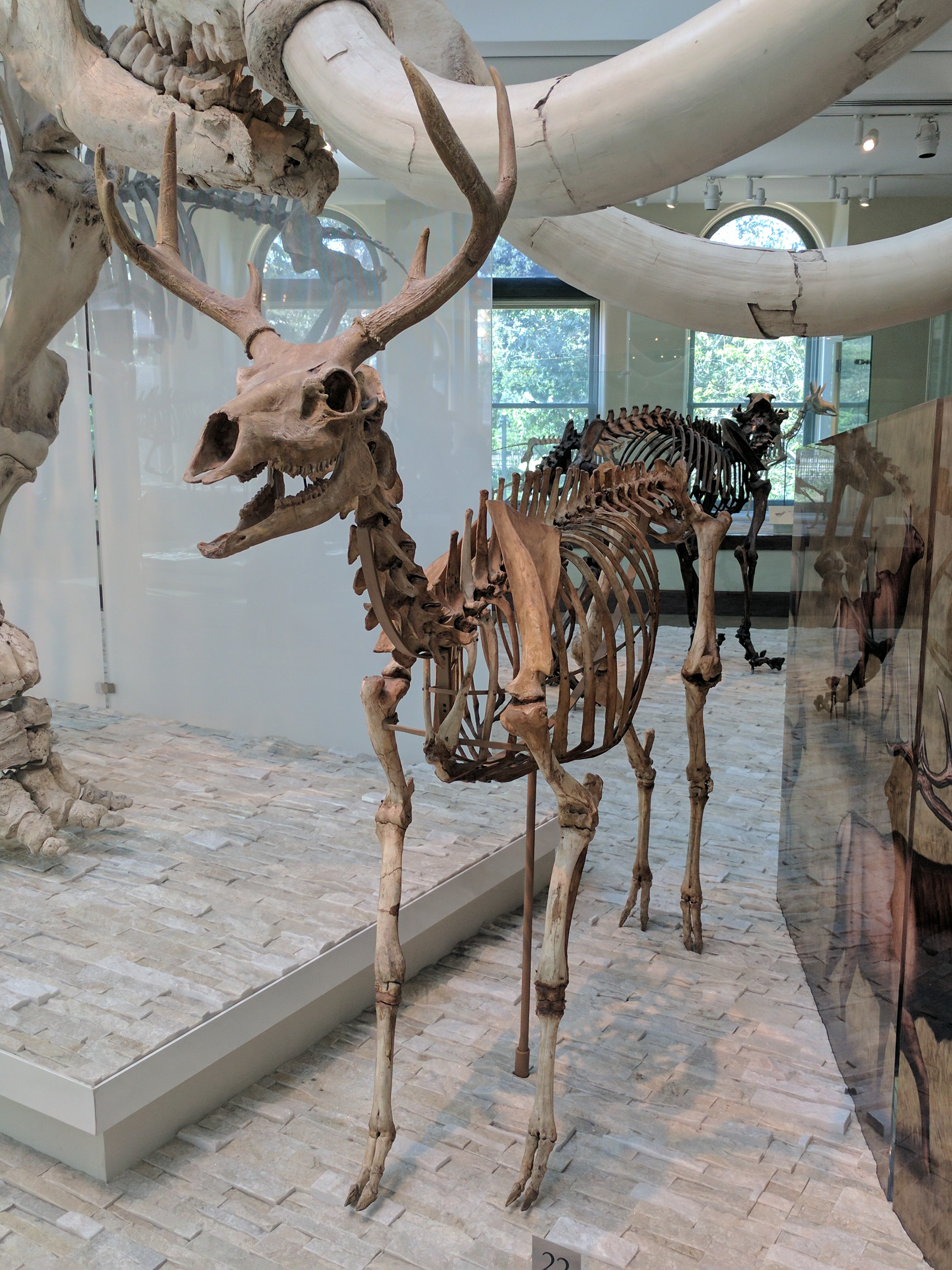
Front view of skeleton

Kurten described a species he called Navahoceros fricki in 1975. However, his analysis has been questioned on technical grounds and new paleontological data. Kurten's analysis was based on averages of length of dissociated bones (sample sizes 9–52), without specifying the sex or age of the source animals, and without providing standard deviations to let the reader know about variability due to sex and age.

One comparative element he used was the skeletal measurements of a single mule deer, but he did not provide the data on sex, age or locality. However, from data provided by Klein (1964) and McMahon (1975), the relative lower leg length of mule deer can vary at least by 22%.

Morejohn and Dailey (2004) published the analysis of the osteological anatomy and morphology of a practically complete skeleton of a Pleistocene adult male Odocoileus lucasi (Hay 1927) along with other collections labeled as O. lucasi. Moreover, for their 54-page analysis they visited most collections of samples identified as Navahoceros as well as other species for a comparative analysis (Cervalces scotti, Alces alces, Rangifer tarandus, Odocoileus hemionus, O. virginianus, Hippocamelus antisensis, H. bisulcus, Mazama americana, Pudu mephistophiles, P. puda, Ozotoceros bezoarticus, Blastocerus dichotomus), located in 27 different institutions worldwide. They also dissected and analyzed fresh materials of Alces, Cervus, Mazama, Odocoileus hemionus, O. virginianus, Ozotoceros, Pudu, and Rangifer.

Their main conclusions are that Navahoceros is a nomen nudum and all revised bones which were labeled as Navahoceros belong to Odocoileus lucasi (including exhibition mounts assembled from dissociated bones).

Although Navahoceros entered the scene based on a very weak analysis which is impossible to verify, the best current evidence based on an extensive comparative study shows that Navahoceros was an invalid construct and pertains to Odocoileus lucasi Hay 1927. Subsequent publications referring to Kurten's Navahoceros simply cited his interpretations without questioning its validity. It is recommended that any future discussion, or reference to Navahoceros, be done explicitly in relation to the known information on Odocoileus lucasi.

The direct anatomical comparison of Hay's two specimens from Idaho and the Honey Lake, California deer by Morejohn indicated they were conspecific (though not explicitly stated in the text) and both are from a large odocoileine deer.

The interpretations given above are not without controversy. Morejohn and Dailey (2004) were primarily focused on documenting differences between Old World cervids and those of the New World. The fossil skeletal material from Honey Lake was assigned to Odocoileus lucasi on perceived similarities with the holotype, a first phalanx, and the paratype, an astragalus. However, no discussion of the perceived similarities was given and, in the discussion regarding the first phalanx, the only direct comparison mentioned was that of a difference between the Honey Lake first phalanx and that of Odocoileus. It can legitimately be argued insofar as published material goes that it is O. lucasi that is a nomen nudum.

Other evidence strongly suggests differences between Navahoceros and Odocoileus. Webb (1992) studied a cranium of Navahoceros from San Josecito Cave and concluded that Rangifer, not Odocoileus, was the sister taxon of Navahoceros. Both Blastoceras and Hippocamelus were found to be closer to Navahoceros than the latter was to other members of the subfamily such as Odocoileus. It is thus far from settled that Navahoceros is a synonym of Odocoileus.

Assuming that the assignment to Odocoileus were to be accepted, it is unlikely that the late Pleistocene taxon is conspecific with O. lucasi (nor did Morejohn and Dailey claim so). Measurements from the literature and the geologic time span involved would indicate otherwise.

== Biology ==
Based on size comparison with modern mule deer the adult, articulated, Honey Lake male specimen would have weighed approximately 600 lb (270 kg), significantly larger than the modern species. Hay's original type specimens (toe element and astragalus) were so large that Hay originally placed it in the genus Cervus; the elements are about the same size as those of the Tule elk, the smallest subspecies of Cervus canadensis.

Kurten stated that Navahoceros resembled ibex (Capra ibex) based on short metapodials which made him label the Navahoceros as a mountain deer with an Alpine climbing mode of locomotion (like ibex), but without providing data on ibex. However, data from Fernandez and Monchot (2007) on ibex show that their bone measurements are far from the averages of Navahoceros presented by Kurten.

Kurten made the explicit correlation that Hippocamelus was related to Navahoceros, only differing by having two, instead of three antler tines, and he thus considered Hippocamelus implicitly to be homologous to chamois and ibex. However, Hippocamelus grow 4 and even 5 tines on each antler, invalidating Kurten's claim, and regarding skeletal proportion, he provided no data on Hippocamelus. Recently, complete appendages were compared between South Andean deer (Hippocamelus bisulcus), mountain goats (Oreamnos americanus), ibex, Himalayan tahr (Hemitragus jemlahicus), bighorn sheep (Ovis canadensis), Navahoceros, chamois (Rupicapra rupicapra), mountain sheep (Ovis ammon), tule elk (Cervus canadensis nannodes), mule deer (Odocoileus hemionus), Odocoileus lucasi, red deer (Cervus elaphus), and blackbuck (Antilope cervicapra). Huemul morphology did not overlap with rock climbing species previously considered analogous, but falls within the range of other cervids. In fact, considering the reported variation on leg proportions among several cervids, which can reach 70%, there are Rangifer and Odocoileus virginianus populations with shorter legs than the H. bisulcus sample (by 14%).

== Range ==
Kurten in 1975 described Navahoceros fricki as an extinct member of the family Cervidae and was most common in the North American Rocky Mountains during the Pleistocene. It survived to about 11,500 BP from evidence found in Burnet Cave in the Guadalupe Mountains of southern New Mexico.
