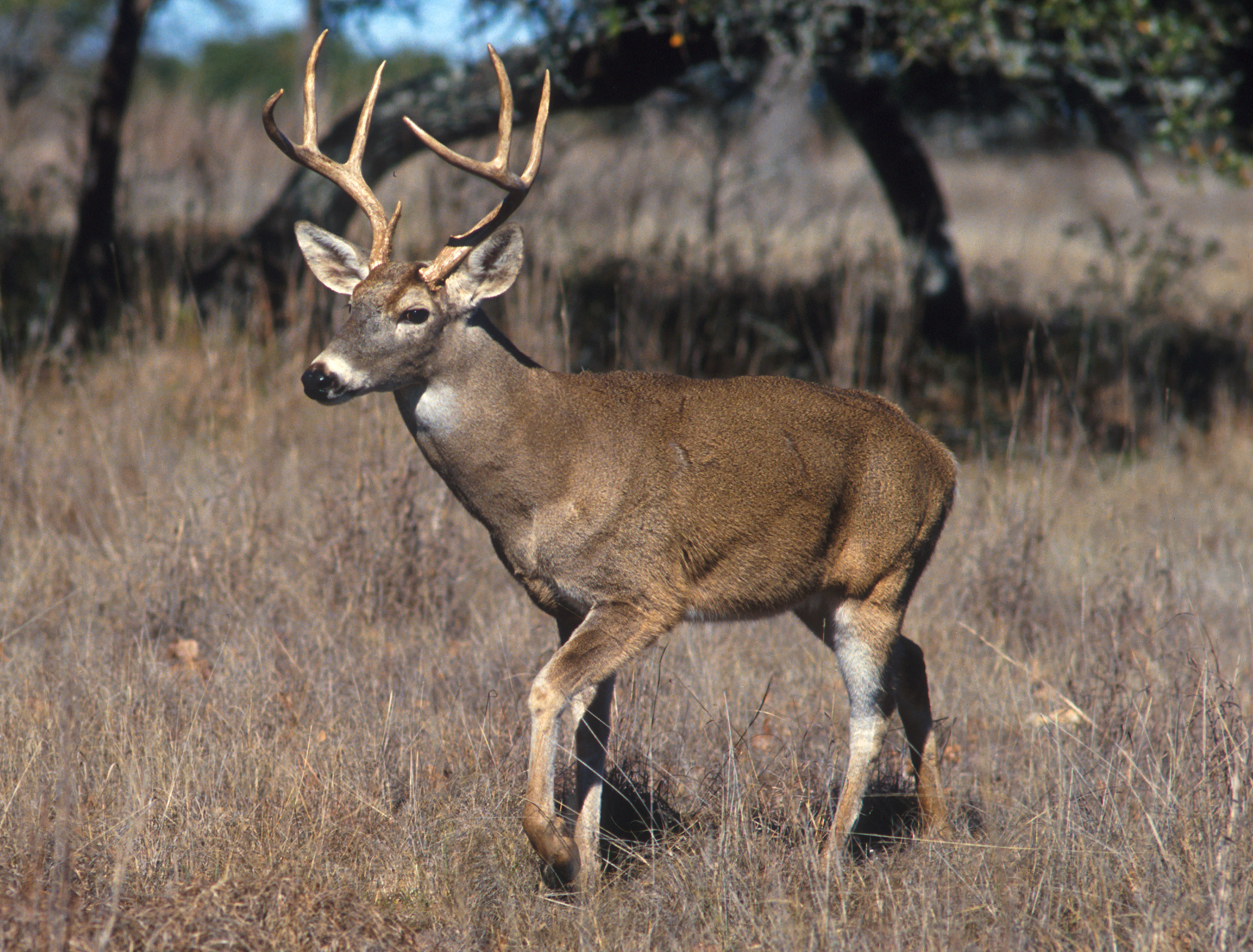
- Odocoileus virginianus

Scientific classification
- Kingdom: Animalia
- Phylum: Chordata
- Class: Mammalia
- Order: Artiodactyla
- Family: Cervidae
- Subfamily: Capreolinae
- Tribe: Odocoileini
- Genus: Odocoileus; Rafinesque, 1832

Type species
- Odocoileus speleus Rafinesque, 1832

Species
- Odocoileus hemionus Odocoileus pandora Odocoileus virginianus †Odocoileus lucasi †Odocoileus salinae

= Odocoileus =

Odocoileus Temporal range: Pleistocene to present

Genus of medium-sized deer

Odocoileus is a genus of medium-sized deer (family Cervidae) containing three species native to the Americas. The name, sometimes spelled odocoeleus, is a contraction of the Greek root odont-, meaning "tooth," and -coelus, New Latin for "hollow".

== Extant species ==
Odocoileus hemionus	Mule deer	western half of North America.
Odocoileus pandora	Yucatan brown brocket	Yucatán Peninsula (Mexico, Guatemala, Belize)
Odocoileus virginianus	White-tailed deer	throughout most of the continental United States, southern Canada, Mexico, Central America, and northern portions of South America as far south as Peru and Bolivia.

== History ==
The genus Odocoileus was named by French zoologist, Constantine S. Rafinesque, in 1832, based on teeth and part of a jaw (presumably of Odocoileus virginianus) gathered by a Mr. Wardel from an anonymous cave in Carlisle, Pennsylvania on the banks of the Conococheague Creek, and kept in the collection of a Mr. Hayden of Baltimore. Rafinesque could refer these teeth to no other living animal known to him, despite having then lived in native white-tailed deer habitat for decades (although the white-tailed deer had been previously described in the literature, between 1850 and 1900 the white-tailed deer population was reduced to 300,000 to 500,000 individuals, found only in remote locations inaccessible to humans). Rafinesque described enamel that covered the tooth, including the hollow inside, and named the species Odocoileus speleus, for "teeth well hollowed" and speleus referring to a cave.
