= Blackbeard Island National Wildlife Refuge =

Wildlife refuge in Georgia, United States

- IUCN category IV (habitat/species management area)
- Location within Georgia Location within the United States
- Interactive map of Blackbeard Island National Wildlife Refuge
- Location: McIntosh County, Georgia
- Nearest city: Savannah, Georgia
- Coordinates: 31°29′27.51″N 81°12′43.80″W
- Area: 5,618 acres (22.74 km^{2})
- Established: 1924
- Visitors: 130,000 (in 2004)
- Governing body: United States Fish and Wildlife Service
- Website: Blackbeard Island National Wildlife Refuge

The Blackbeard Island National Wildlife Refuge is a 5,618 acres (2,274 ha) National Wildlife Refuge located in McIntosh county in Georgia. The refuge was established to provide a nature and forest preserve for aesthetic and conservation purposes.

The refuge is one of seven refuges administered by the Savannah Coastal Refuges Complex in Savannah, Georgia. The complex has a combined staff of 31 with the fiscal year 2005 budget of $3,582,000. About 3,000 acres are protected as a wilderness area.

== History ==
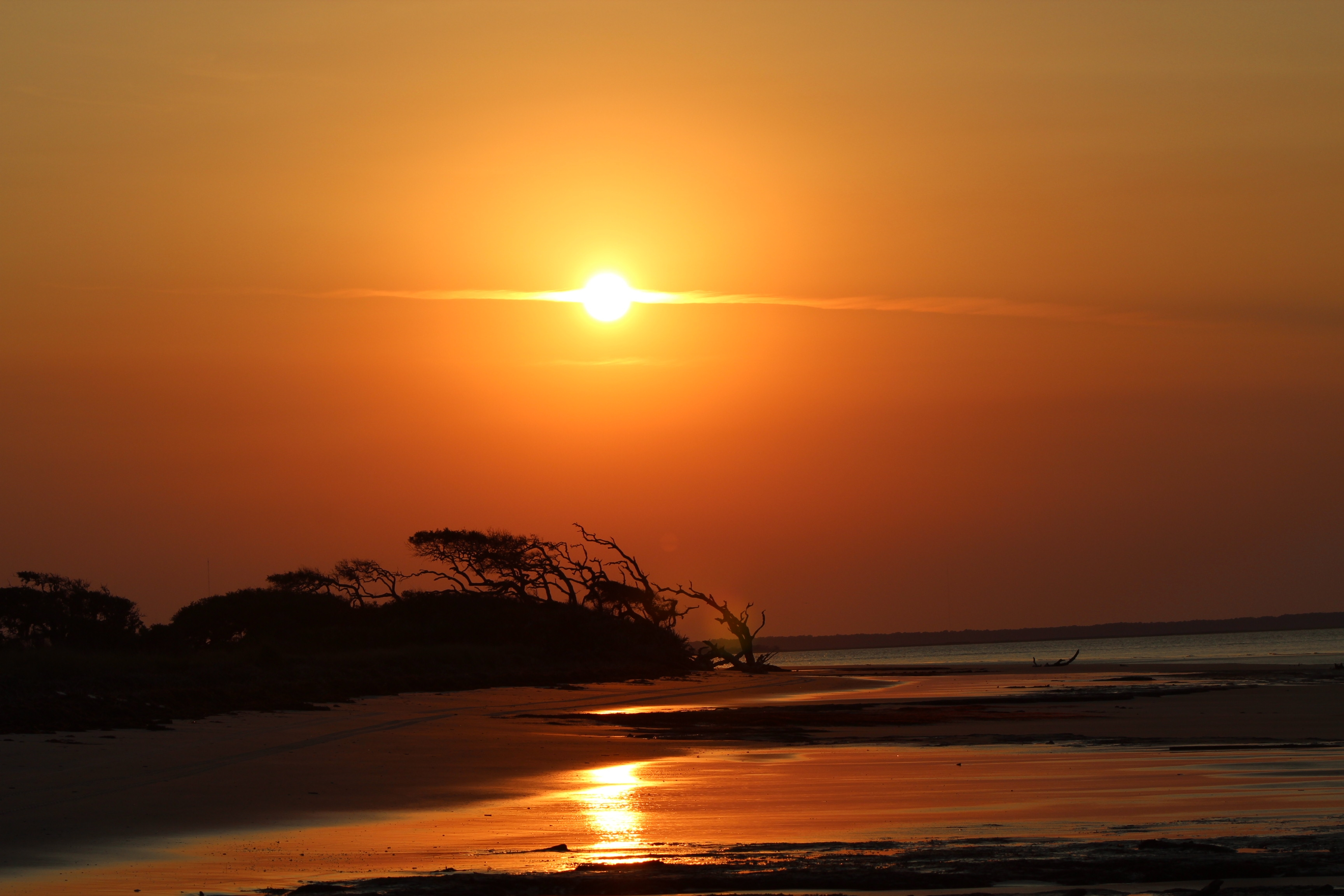
Sunset over the edge of Blackbeard's boneyard beach.

The name of the island comes from Edward Teach, the infamous pirate Blackbeard. There is a legend that part of his treasure is buried on the island. There has never been a single doubloon found, though. The last hunt took place in the 1880s on the north end of the island. There have been no further authorized attempts since.

The land which is currently Blackbeard Island originally came from the Navy Department in 1800 in a public auction as a source of live oak timber for ship building. The island was then placed under the jurisdiction of the Bureau of Biological Survey to be maintained as a preserve and breeding ground for native wildlife and migratory birds in 1924. A presidential proclamation in 1940 changed its designation from Blackbeard Island Reservation to Blackbeard Island National Wildlife Refuge.

The Southern Atlantic Quarantine Station was created on Blackbeard Island by the US Navy, and operated between 1880 and 1910.

The Blackbeard Island National Wildlife Refuge was activated for Parks On The Air in 2023.

== Topography ==
Blackbeard Island is accessible only by boat. Transportation to the island is not provided by the Fish and Wildlife Service. A public boat ramp on Harris Neck NWR (Barbour River Landing) may also be used as a launching site for trips to the island.

The island consists of interconnecting linear dunes thickly covered by oak/palmetto vegetation. There are approximately 1,163 acres (471 ha) of open freshwater or freshwater marsh, 2,000 acres (810 ha) of regularly flooded salt marsh, 2,115 acres (856 ha) of maritime forest, and 340 acres (140 ha) of sandy beach.

== Wildlife and protected species ==
The main objective of the refuge is to provide wintering habitat and protection for migratory birds. It is also to provide protection and management for endangered and threatened species such as the loggerhead sea turtle, American bald eagle, wood stork, and piping plover. Notable concentrations of waterfowl, wading birds, shorebirds, songbirds, raptors, deer, and alligators can be seen at various times of the year.

== Facilities ==
There is no visitor center at the refuge.

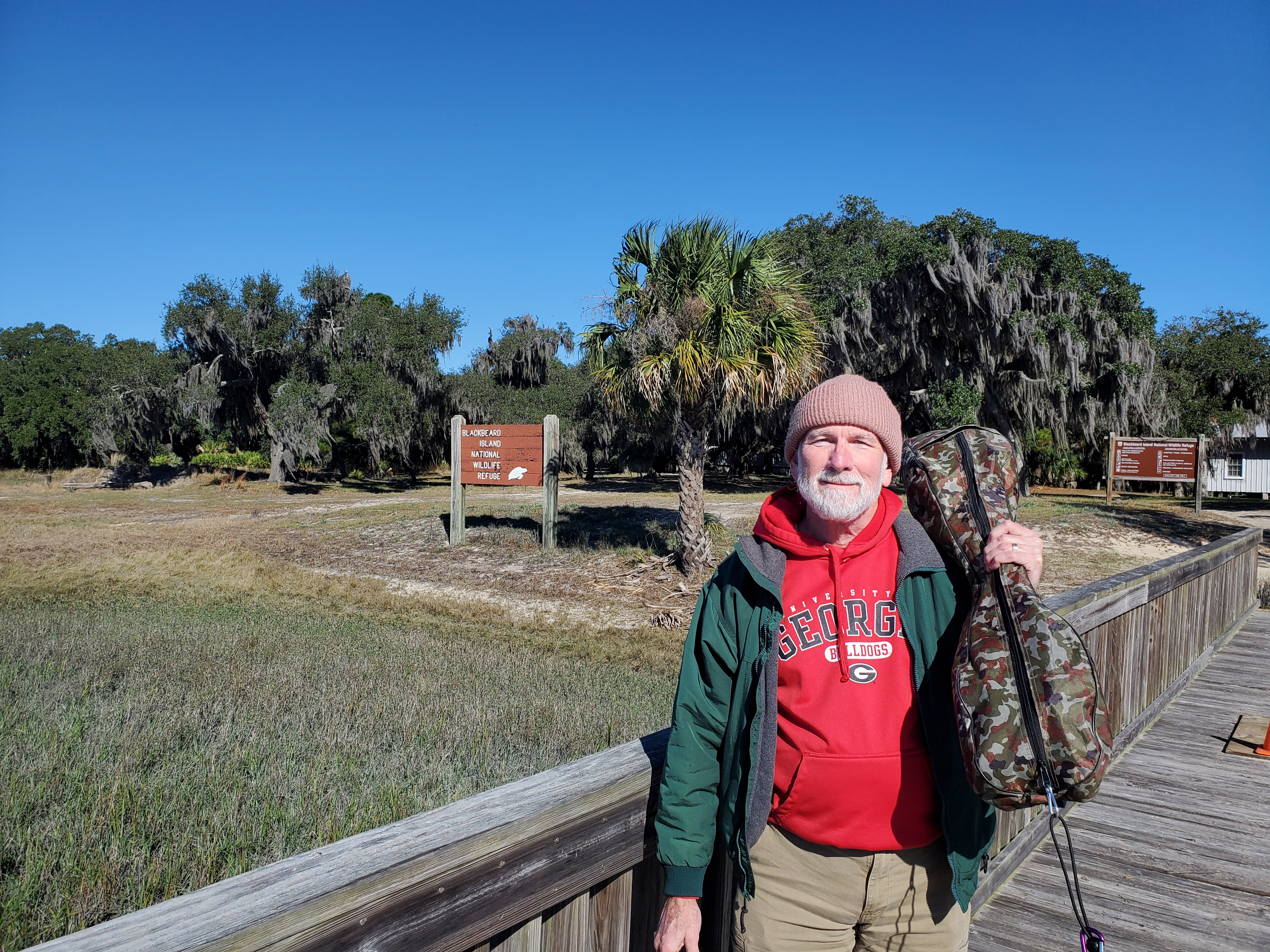
K-0260 Blackbeard Island NWR walkway

== See also ==
- List of National Wildlife Refuges
