= Deer management =

Practice of regulating deer population

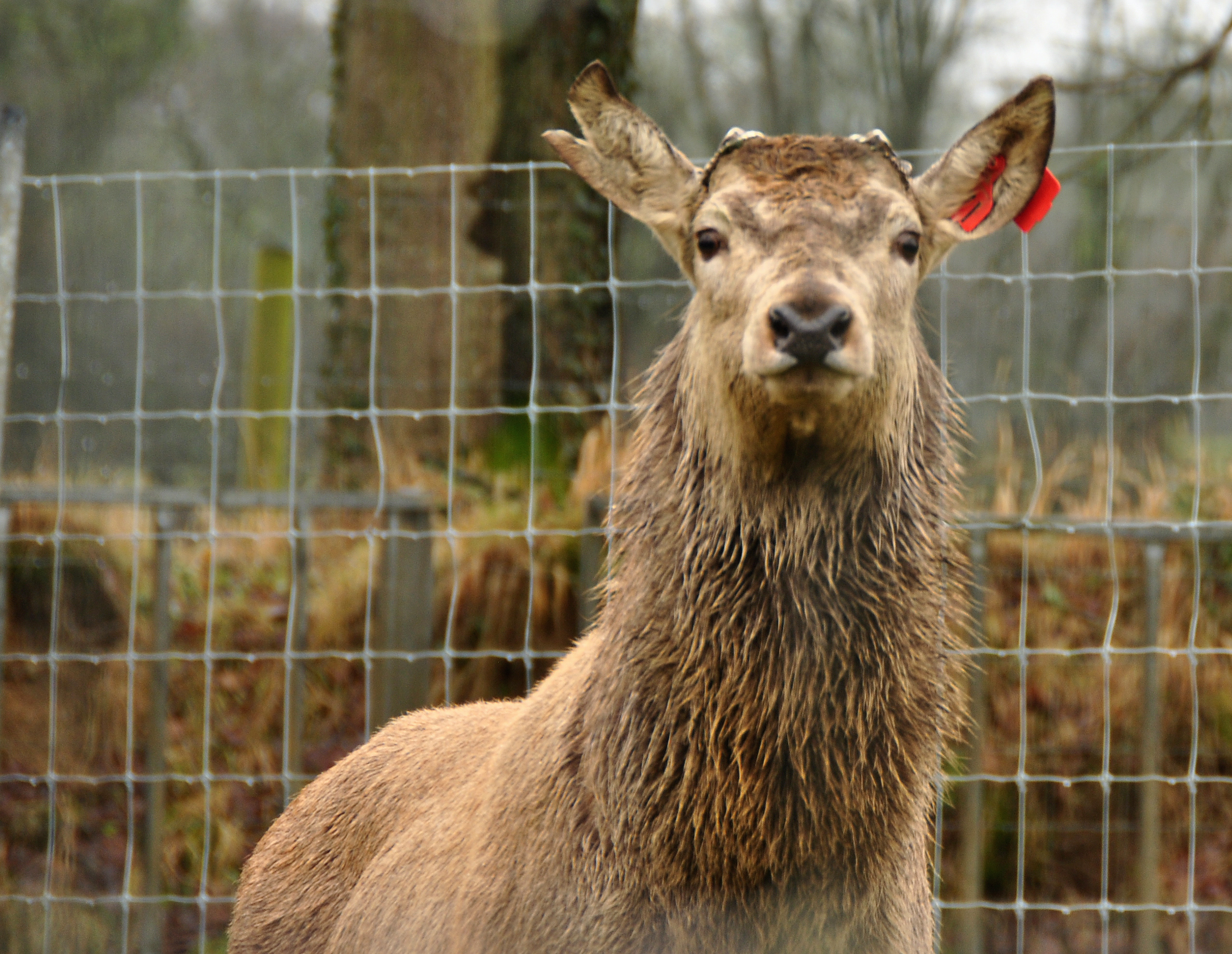
A deer at a farm

Deer management is the practice and philosophy of wildlife management employed to regulate the population of deer in an area. The purpose of deer management is to regulate the population's size, reduce negative effects of population on the ecosystem, and maintain the integrity of other populations. Due to economic activity of hunting (coming from fees and licenses), deer management can be an important contributor for state and government revenue.

== Background ==
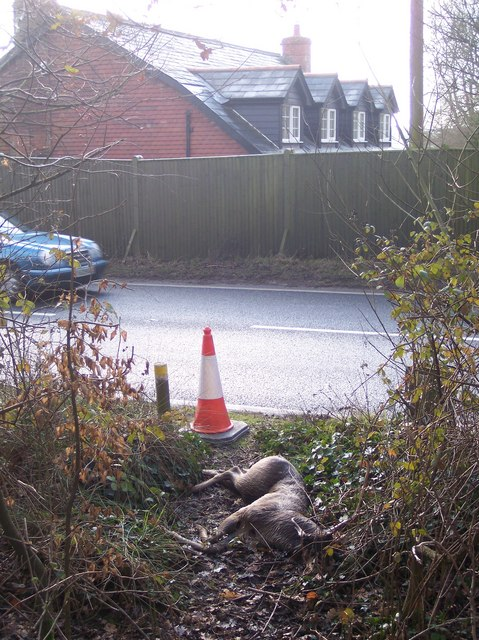
Deer after being hit by a vehicle

As a deer population grows it will begin to reach the carrying capacity of an ecosystem, causing issues for other plants and wildlife. Plant life can begin to disappear locally because of browsing. These local disappearances directly affect the population of that plant species and indirectly affect other wildlife populations that also depend on the plant species for food. This ultimately lowers the biodiversity and changes the composition of the habitat, region, or area until the population of deer is lowered and the location is given time to recover. In many cases, habitats are unable to recover from deer overpopulation on their own because deer extirpate a variety of native species from the area. Once these organisms are lost from an area, they typically do not return without human intervention, meaning that forests that have reached ideal deer population levels may still lack most of their biodiversity. When deer browse an area and remove native plants, exotic and invasive species tend to take over the forest floor, further hindering a forests health and ability to recover from previous deer overpopulation.

Deer populations may reach the carrying capacity, leading to an increase in human and deer interactions. These interactions can result in car accidents, crop damage, property damage, Lyme disease transmission, and much more. These species interaction occur both in rural and urban areas where population of deer come into contact.

Each area comes with its own set of challenges as to which management practice is the most appropriate and effective. These challenges have led to the development of alternative methods of deer management. In suburban area, sharpshooting is used. Other locations may use methods like hunting, birth control, or repellents to manage the deer population.

Deer population may be negatively impacted by infectious disease in the population, such as chronic wasting disease. Chronic wasting disease is present in 25 states in the United States, three Canadian provinces, Finland, Norway, and South Korea. Chronic wasting disease was first discovered in white-tailed deer and elk in 1978. Chronic wasting disease has no cure and is 100% fatal to deer.

== Organizations ==
=== The United States Fish and Wildlife Service ===
The United States Fish and Wildlife Service (USFWS or FWS) is a bureau under the Department of the Interior that runs national programs for the public to learn about natural resources like fish and wildlife. The USFWS advise the conservation, management and advancement of the wildlife and fish in the United States as well as assists in international conservation efforts. The United States Fish and Wildlife Service deals with the enforcement of federal wildlife laws, protects endangered species and conservation and restoration wildlife habitat such as wetlands.

== Methods ==
There are various methods that can be employed to have deer management and they can be broken down into two main types: lethal and nonlethal. These methods are used to regulate the population of deer in a specific area. If a deer population remains high for long periods, an ecosystem can suffer long term damage, forestry practices become more restricted and overall biodiversity can decline. Areas with an abnormally high deer population density often have a variety of native plants extirpated (adding to the loss of biodiversity), and replaced with competing, invasive species.

=== Lethal management ===
==== Hunting ====
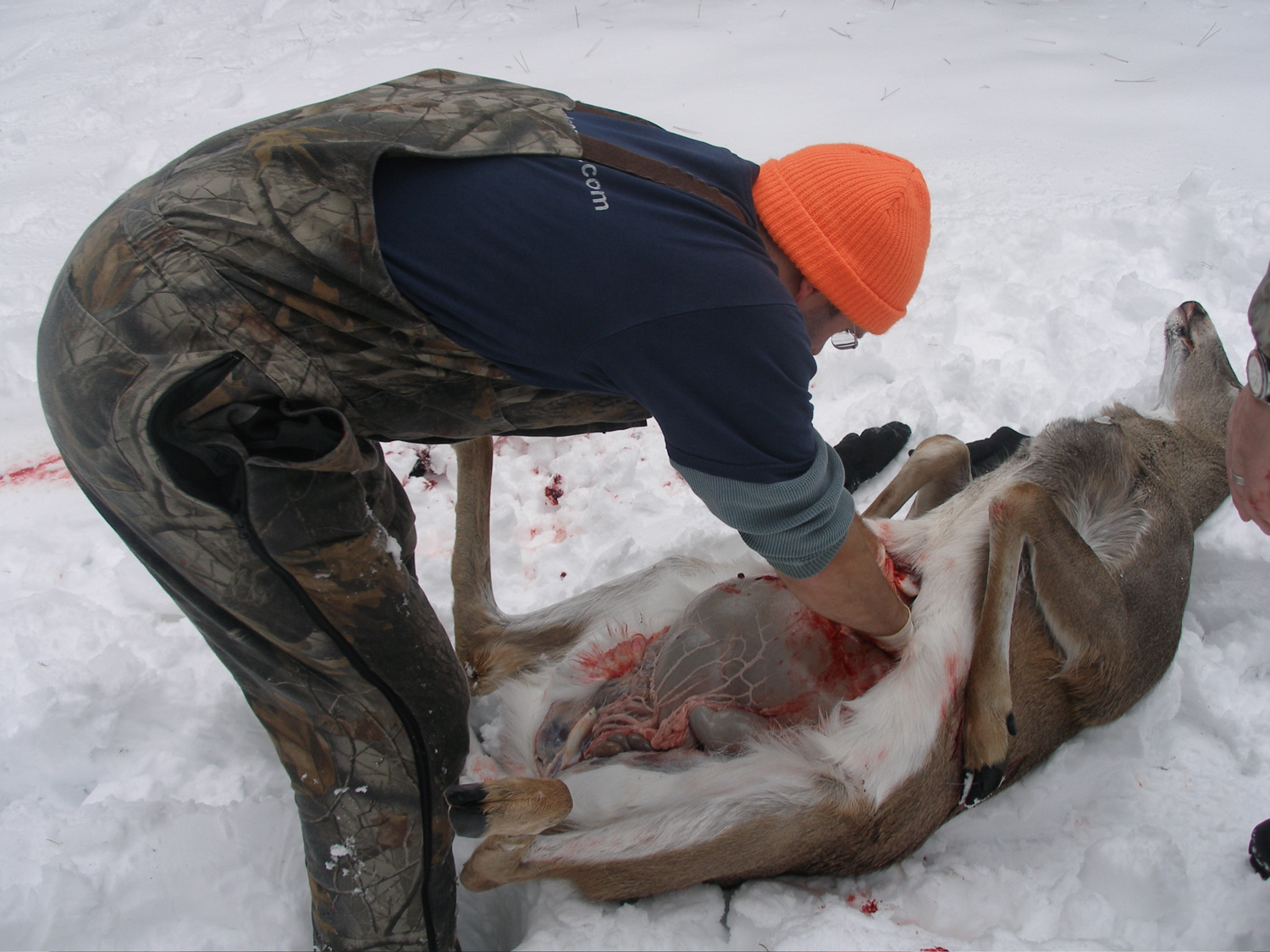
Hunter field dressing a deer

Deer hunting is a practice employed to regulate the population of deer. Hunting is a form of predation in which the deer are a food source or a trophy. Deer hunting is conducted in seasons that are regulated by government agency with tag limits for both bucks and does. Deer hunting can be conducted using a bow and arrow, rifle, muzzle loader or other approved weapons. Hunting is only an effective method of population control when antlerless deer are targeted. The hunting of bucks has little impact on the population over time because one buck is able to breed numerous does. Currently, hunting targeting antlerless deer is considered the most effective form of population control.

=== Nonlethal management ===
==== Chemical repellents ====
If an area is being heavily affected by deer, repellents can be used to keep them away or minimize the damage. Deer repellent can produce a bad smell, burn the tongue, and taste bad. The repellents can be natural or artificial but both use chemicals to deter the deer from causing damage. Repellents benefit gardens and orchids the most.

==== Fencing ====
Fencing forms a physical barrier, preventing the deer from entering an area. Deer fences can range from 3 ft. to 10 ft. tall. There numerous types of fences used to prevent deer from causing damage, some types are electrical or high tensile. The amount of time and type of management will typically determine the type of fence that is required for optimal deer damage prevention.

==== Wildlife birth control ====
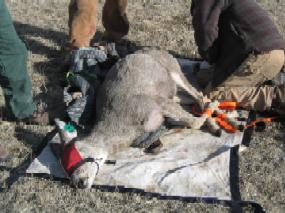
Deer being administered a birth control shot

Another way to control the population of deer is to regulate the birth rate. Decreasing the birth will limit the growth rate of the herd. Birth control vaccines have been invented that will prevent doe from having fawns for up to 3 years. These vaccines can be administered by dart or by a shot. This type of management would be an alternative to hunting and most effective in urban areas where hunting may pose an issue.
