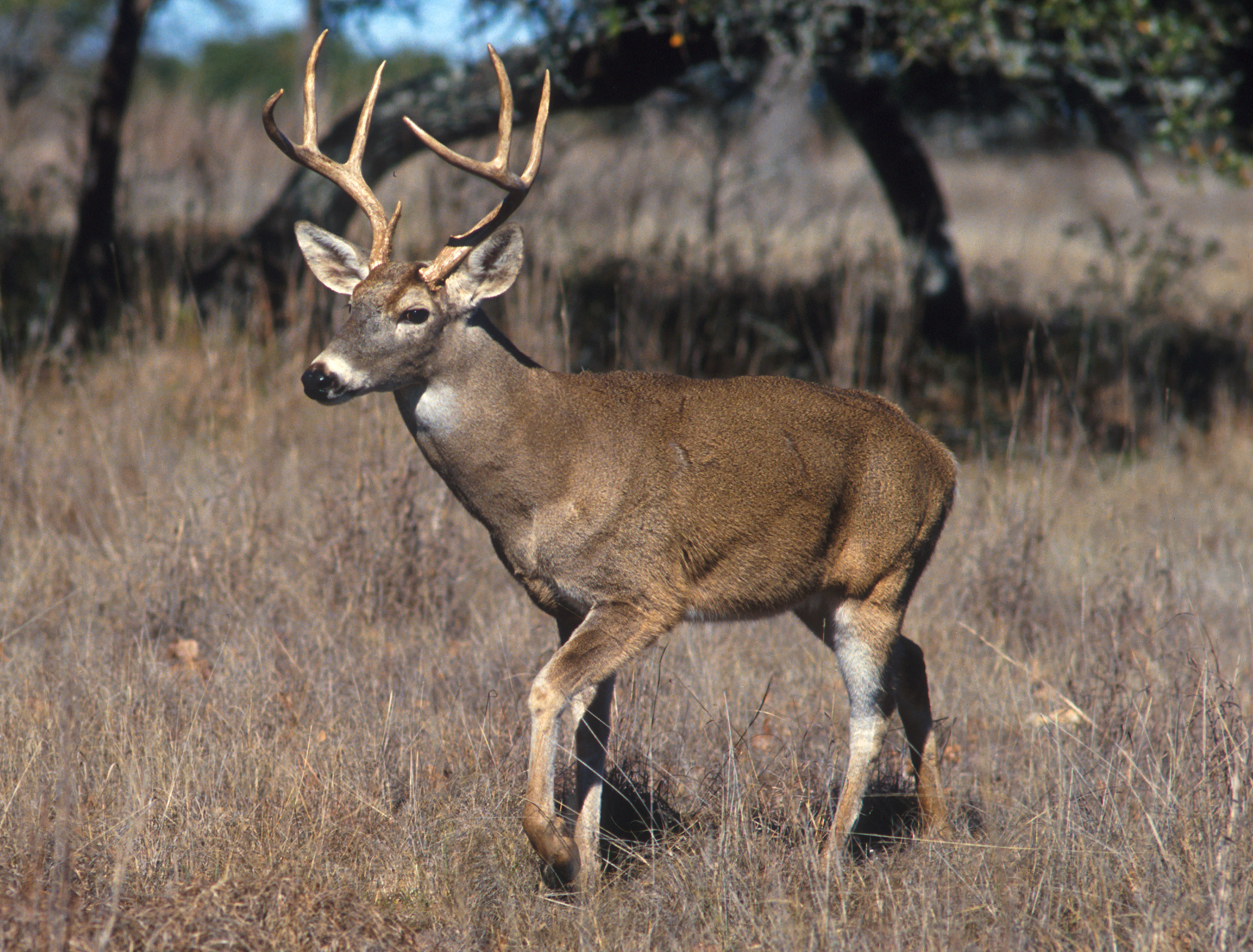
- Whitetail deer male (stag)

Scientific classification
- Kingdom: Animalia
- Phylum: Chordata
- Class: Mammalia
- Order: Artiodactyla
- Infraorder: Pecora
- Family: Cervidae; Goldfuss, 1820

Type genus
- Cervus Linnaeus, 1758

Subfamilies
- Capreolinae; Cervinae
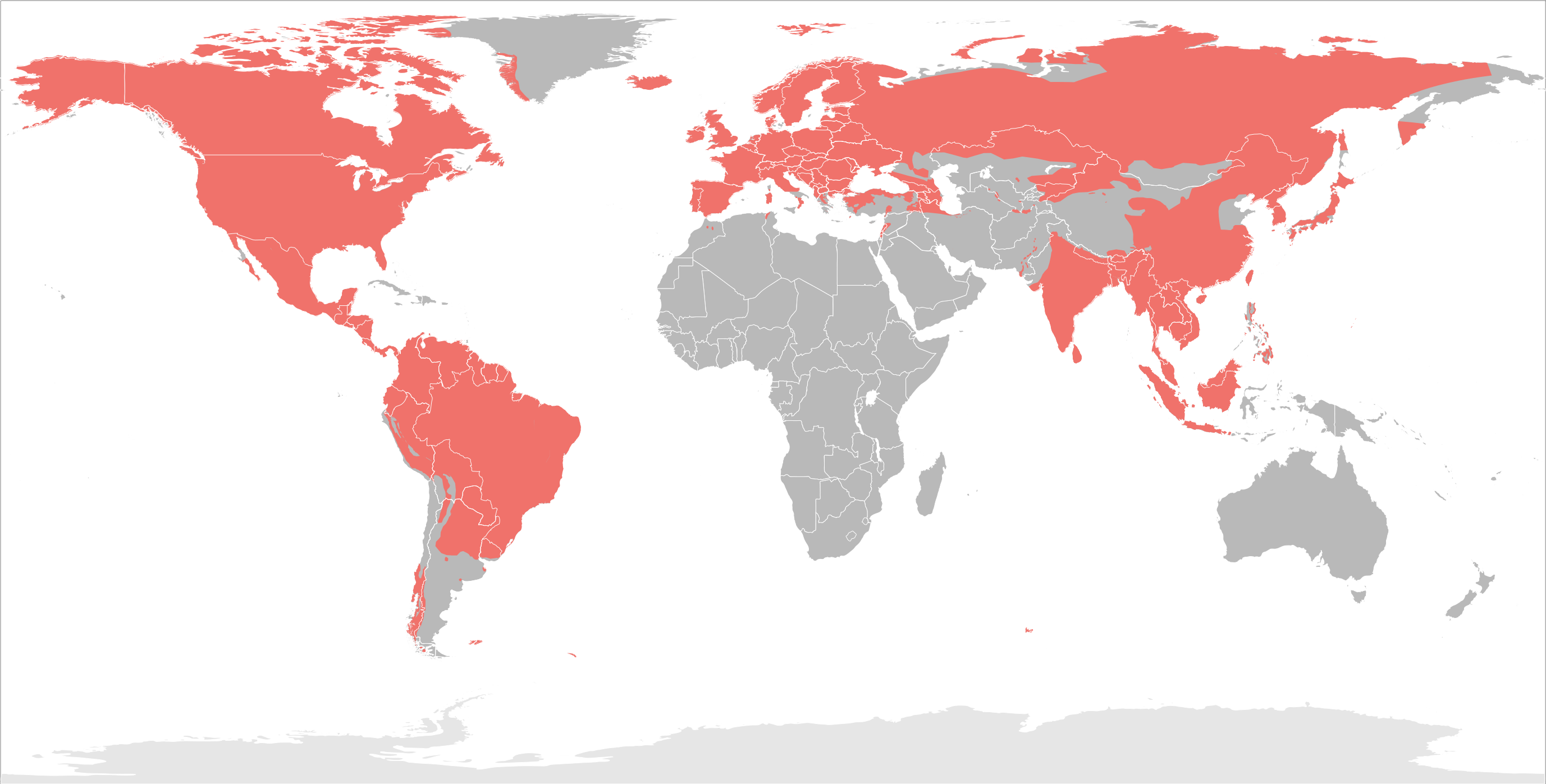
- Cervidae distribution

= Deer =

Deer Temporal range: Early Miocene – Recent

Family of hoofed mammals

A deer (pl.: deer) or true deer is a hoofed ruminant ungulate of the family Cervidae (informally the deer family). Cervidae is divided into subfamilies Cervinae (which includes muntjac, elk, red deer, and fallow deer) and Capreolinae (which includes reindeer, white-tailed deer, roe deer, and moose). Male deer of almost all species (except the water deer), as well as female reindeer, grow and shed new antlers each year. These antlers are bony extensions of the skull and are often used for combat between males.

The musk deer (Moschidae) of Asia and chevrotains (Tragulidae) of tropical African and Asian forests are separate families that are also in the ruminant clade Ruminantia; they are not especially closely related to Cervidae.

Deer appear in art from Paleolithic cave paintings onwards, and they have played a role in mythology, religion, and literature throughout history, as well as in heraldry, such as red deer that appear in the coat of arms of Åland. Their economic importance includes the use of their meat as venison, their skins as soft, strong buckskin, and their antlers as handles for knives. Deer hunting has been a popular activity since the Middle Ages and remains a resource for many families today.

== Etymology and terminology ==
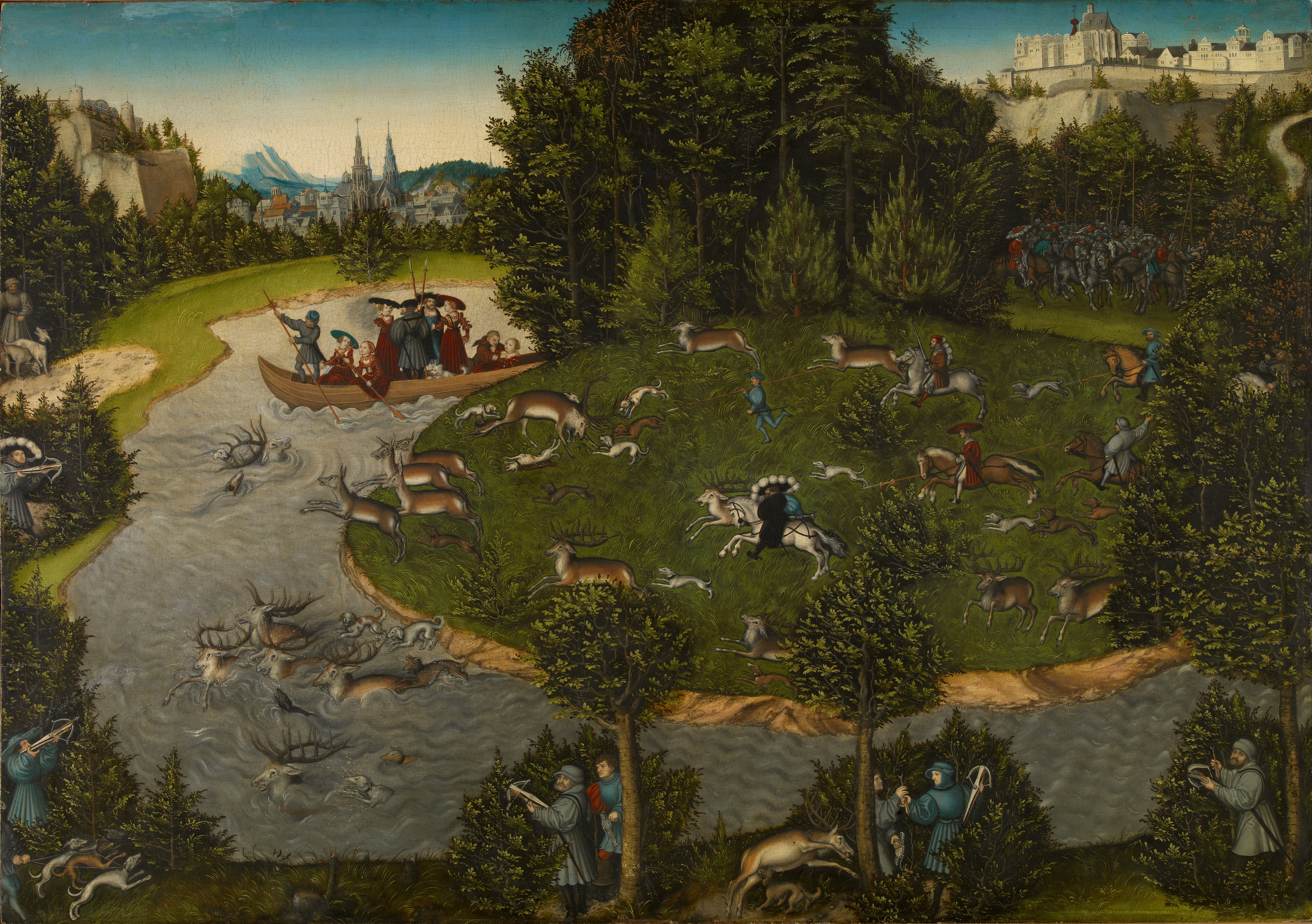
"The Stag Hunt of Frederick III, Elector of Saxony" by Lucas Cranach the Elder, 1529

The word deer was originally broad in meaning, becoming more specific with time. Old English dēor and Middle English der meant a wild animal of any kind. Cognates of Old English dēor in other dead Germanic languages have the general sense of animal, such as Old High German tior, Old Norse djur or dȳr, Gothic dius, Old Saxon dier, and Old Frisian diar. This general sense gave way to the modern English sense by the end of the Middle English period, around 1500. All modern Germanic languages save English and Scots retain the more general sense: for example, Dutch/Frisian dier, German Tier, and Norwegian dyr mean 'animal'.

For many types of deer in modern English usage, the male is a buck and the female a doe, but the terms vary with dialect, and according to the size of the species. The male red deer is a stag, while for other large species the male is a bull, the female a cow, as in cattle. In older usage, the male of any species is a hart, especially if over five years old, and the female is a hind, especially if three or more years old. The young of small species is a fawn and of large species a calf; a very small young may be a kid. A castrated male is a havier. A group of any species is a herd. The adjective of relation is cervine; like the family name Cervidae, this is from Latin: cervus, meaning 'stag' or 'deer'.

== Distribution ==
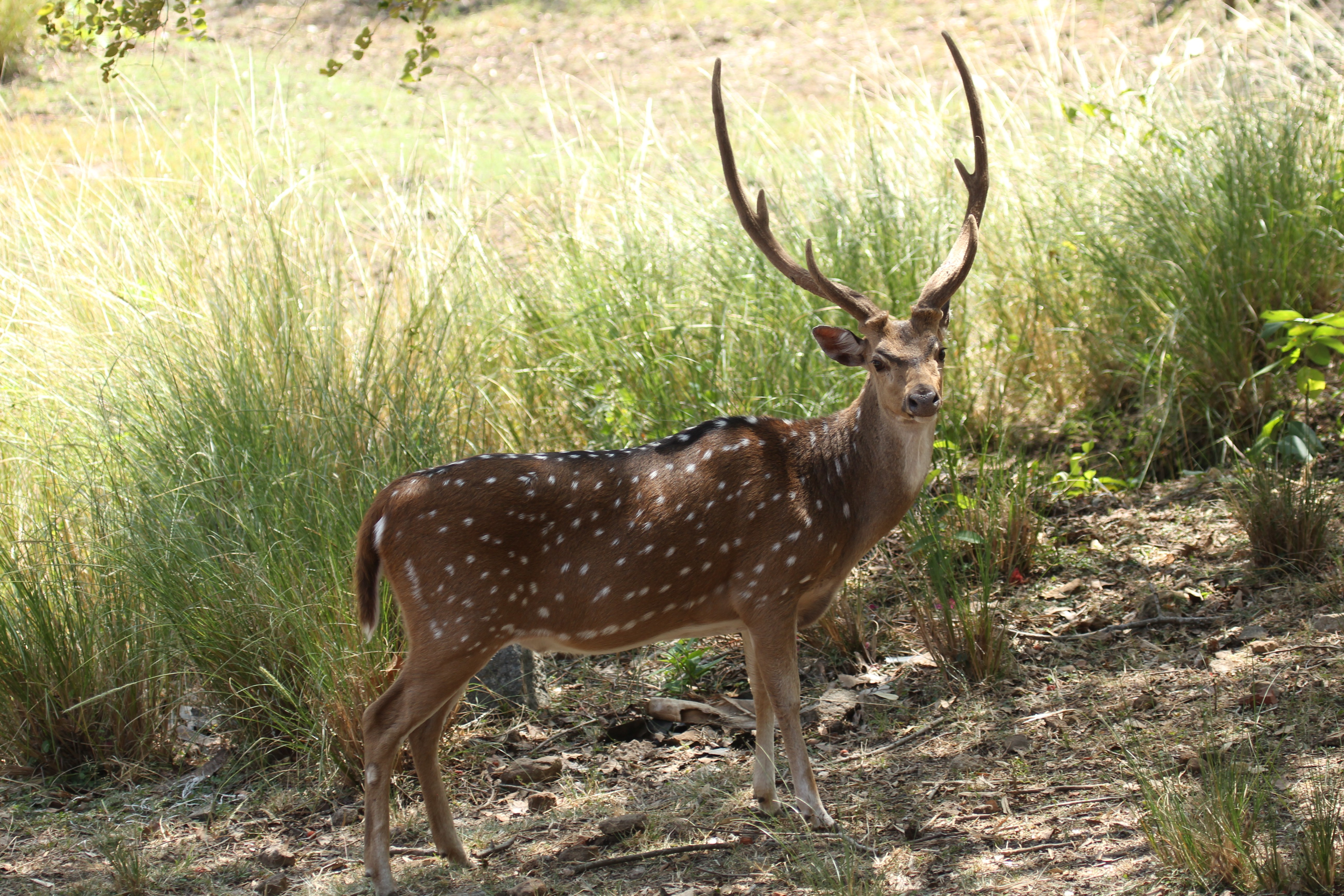
Chital deer in Nagarahole, India

Deer live in a variety of biomes, ranging from tundra to the tropical rainforest. While often associated with forests, many deer are ecotone species that live in transitional areas between forests and thickets (for cover) and prairie and savanna (open space). The majority of large deer species inhabit temperate mixed deciduous forest, mountain mixed coniferous forest, tropical seasonal/dry forest, and savanna habitats around the world. Clearing open areas within forests to some extent may actually benefit deer populations by exposing the understory and allowing the types of grasses, weeds, and herbs to grow that deer like to eat. Access to adjacent croplands may also benefit deer. Adequate forest or brush cover must still be provided for populations to grow and thrive.

Deer are widely distributed, with indigenous representatives in all continents except Antarctica and Australia, though Africa has only one native deer, the Barbary stag, a subspecies of red deer that is confined to the Atlas Mountains in the northwest of the continent. Another extinct species of deer, Megaceroides algericus, was present in North Africa until 6000 years ago. Fallow deer have been introduced to South Africa. Small species of brocket deer and pudús of Central and South America, and muntjacs of Asia generally occupy dense forests and are less often seen in open spaces, with the possible exception of the Indian muntjac. There are also several species of deer that are highly specialized and live almost exclusively in mountains, grasslands, swamps, and "wet" savannas, or riparian corridors surrounded by deserts. Some deer have a circumpolar distribution in both North America and Eurasia. Examples include the caribou that live in Arctic tundra and taiga (boreal forests) and moose that inhabit taiga and adjacent areas. Huemul deer (taruca and Chilean huemul) of South America's Andes fill the ecological niches of the ibex and wild goat, with the fawns behaving more like goat kids.

The highest concentration of large deer species in temperate North America lies in the Canadian Rocky Mountain and Columbia Mountain regions between Alberta and British Columbia where all five North American deer species (white-tailed deer, mule deer, caribou, elk, and moose) can be found. This region has several clusters of national parks including Mount Revelstoke National Park, Glacier National Park (Canada), Yoho National Park, and Kootenay National Park on the British Columbia side, and Banff National Park, Jasper National Park, and Glacier National Park (U.S.) on the Alberta and Montana sides. Mountain slope habitats vary from moist coniferous/mixed forested habitats to dry subalpine/pine forests with alpine meadows higher up. The foothills and river valleys between the mountain ranges provide a mosaic of cropland and deciduous parklands. The rare woodland caribou have the most restricted range living at higher altitudes in the subalpine meadows and alpine tundra areas of some of the mountain ranges. Elk and mule deer both migrate between the alpine meadows and lower coniferous forests and tend to be most common in this region. Elk also inhabit river valley bottomlands, which they share with White-tailed deer. The White-tailed deer have recently expanded their range within the foothills and river valley bottoms of the Canadian Rockies owing to conversion of land to cropland and the clearing of coniferous forests allowing more deciduous vegetation to grow up the mountain slopes. They also live in the aspen parklands north of Calgary and Edmonton, where they share habitat with the moose. The adjacent Great Plains grassland habitats are left to herds of elk, American bison, and pronghorn.

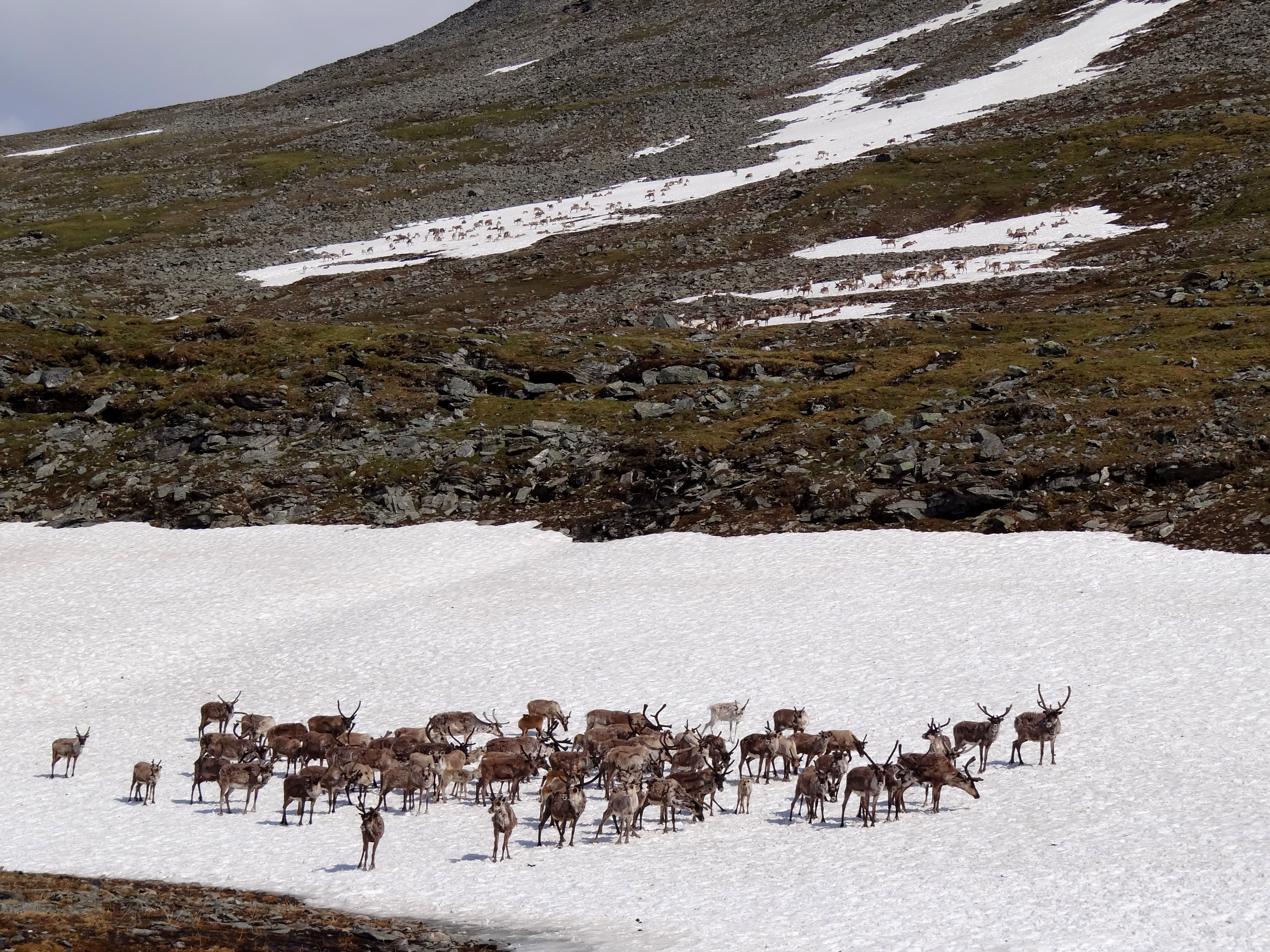
Reindeer herds standing on snow to avoid flies

The Eurasian Continent (including the Indian Subcontinent) boasts the most species of deer in the world, with most species being found in Asia. Europe, in comparison, has lower diversity in plant and animal species. Many national parks and protected reserves in Europe have populations of red deer, roe deer, and fallow deer. These species have long been associated with the continent of Europe, but also inhabit Asia Minor, the Caucasus Mountains, and Northwestern Iran. "European" fallow deer historically lived over much of Europe during the Ice Ages, but afterwards became restricted primarily to the Anatolian Peninsula, in present-day Turkey.

Present-day fallow deer populations in Europe are a result of historic man-made introductions of this species, first to the Mediterranean regions of Europe, then eventually to the rest of Europe. They were initially park animals that later escaped and reestablished themselves in the wild. Historically, Europe's deer species shared their deciduous forest habitat with other herbivores, such as the extinct tarpan (forest horse), extinct aurochs (forest ox), and the endangered wisent (European bison). Good places to see deer in Europe include the Scottish Highlands, the Austrian Alps, the wetlands between Austria, Hungary, and the Czech Republic, and some National Parks, including Doñana National Park in Spain, the Veluwe in the Netherlands, the Ardennes in Belgium, and Białowieża National Park in Poland. Spain, Eastern Europe, and the Caucasus Mountains have forest areas that are not only home to sizable deer populations but also other animals that were once abundant such as the wisent, Eurasian lynx, Iberian lynx, wolves, and brown bears.

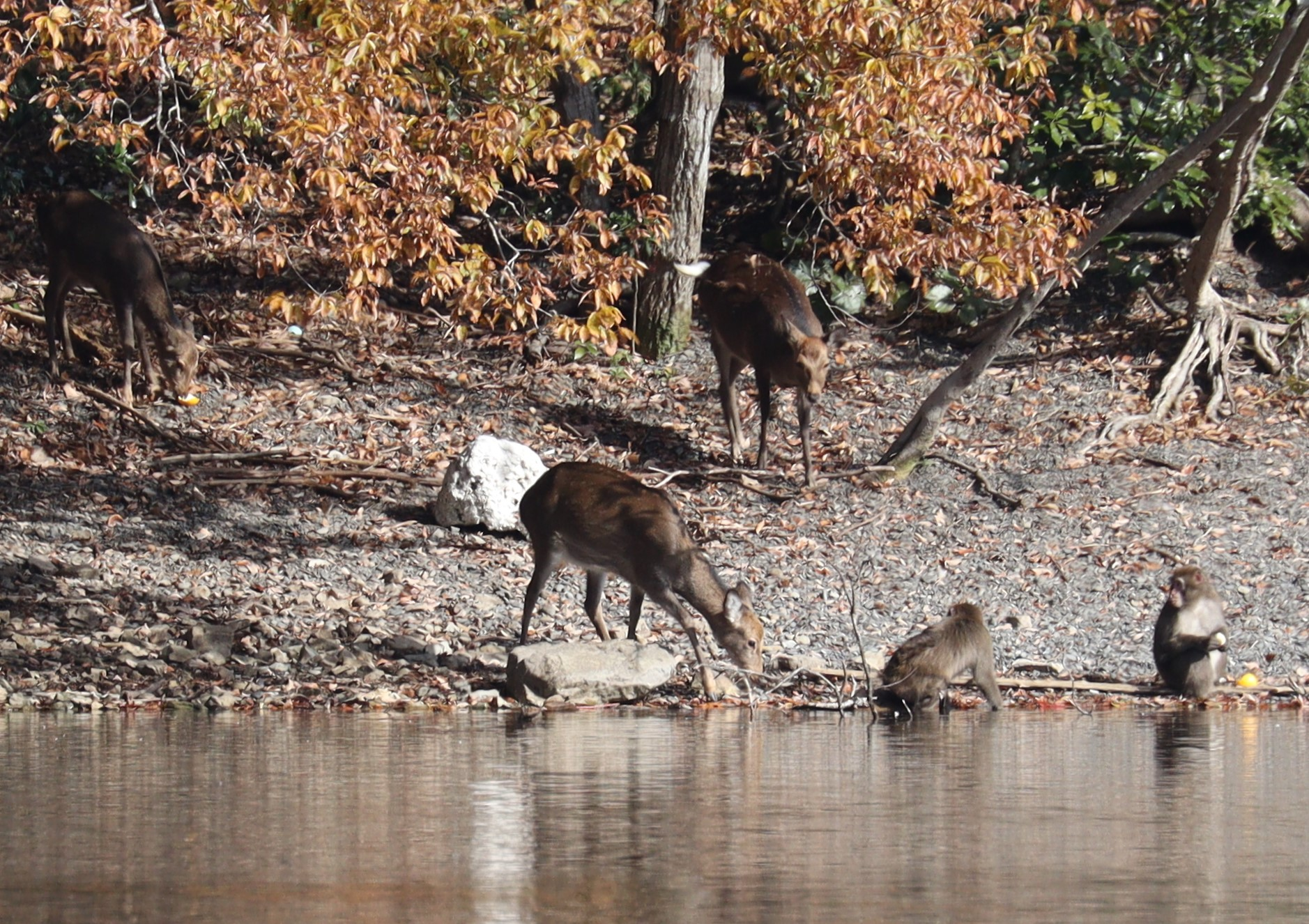
Some sika deer (Cervus nippon) and Japanese macaques (Macaca fuscata) along a waterside

The highest concentration of large deer species in temperate Asia occurs in the mixed deciduous forests, mountain coniferous forests, and taiga bordering North Korea, Manchuria (Northeastern China), and the Ussuri Region (Russia). These are among some of the richest deciduous and coniferous forests in the world where one can find Siberian roe deer, sika deer, elk, and moose. Asian caribou occupy the northern fringes of this region along the Sino-Russian border.

Deer such as the sika deer, Thorold's deer, Central Asian red deer, and elk have historically been farmed for their antlers by Han Chinese, Turkic peoples, Tungusic peoples, Mongolians, and Koreans. Like the Sami people of Finland and Scandinavia, the Tungusic peoples, Mongolians, and Turkic peoples of Southern Siberia, Northern Mongolia, and the Ussuri Region have also taken to raising semi-domesticated herds of Asian caribou.

The highest concentration of large deer species in the tropics occurs in Southern Asia in India's Indo-Gangetic Plain Region and Nepal's Terai Region. These fertile plains consist of tropical seasonal moist deciduous, dry deciduous forests, and both dry and wet savannas that are home to chital, hog deer, barasingha, Indian sambar, and Indian muntjac. Grazing species such as the endangered barasingha and very common chital are gregarious and live in large herds. Indian sambar can be gregarious but are usually solitary or live in smaller herds. Hog deer are solitary and have lower densities than Indian muntjac. Deer can be seen in several national parks in India, Nepal, and Sri Lanka of which Kanha National Park, Dudhwa National Park, and Chitwan National Park are most famous. Sri Lanka's Wilpattu National Park and Yala National Park have large herds of Indian sambar and chital. The Indian sambar are more gregarious in Sri Lanka than other parts of their range and tend to form larger herds than elsewhere.

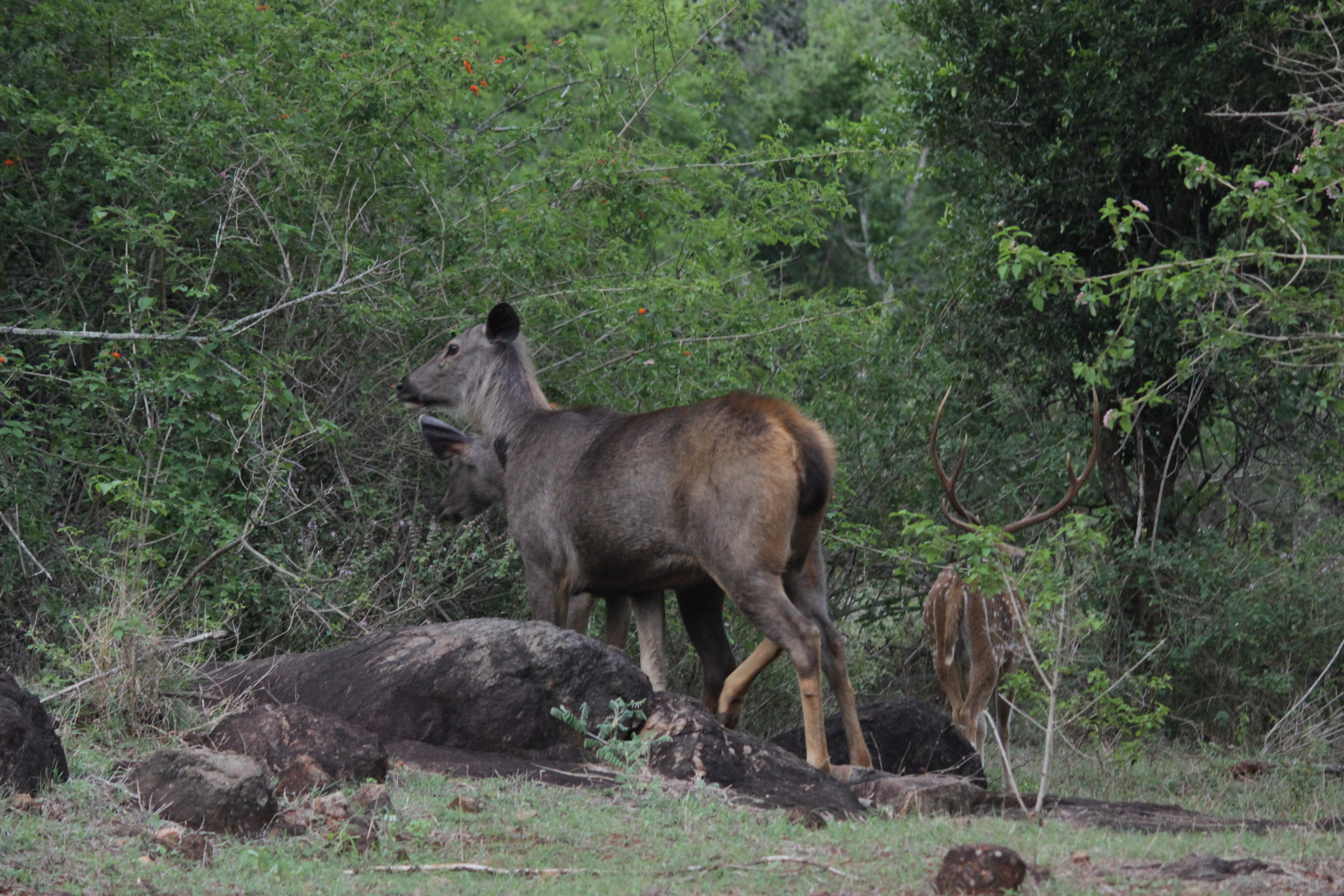
A couple Sambar does and a Chital buck roaming the Sigur Plateau in southern India

The Chao Praya River Valley of Thailand was once primarily tropical seasonal moist deciduous forest and wet savanna that hosted populations of hog deer, the now-extinct Schomburgk's deer, Eld's deer, Indian sambar, and Indian muntjac. Both the hog deer and Eld's deer are rare, whereas Indian sambar and Indian muntjac thrive in protected national parks, such as Khao Yai. Many of these South Asian and Southeast Asian deer species also share their habitat with other herbivores, such as Asian elephants, the various Asian rhinoceros species, various antelope species (such as nilgai, four-horned antelope, blackbuck, and Indian gazelle in India), and wild oxen (such as wild Asian water buffalo, gaur, banteng, and kouprey). One way that different herbivores can survive together in a given area is for each species to have different food preferences, although there may be some overlap.

As a result of acclimatisation society releases in the 19th century, Australia has six introduced species of deer that have established sustainable wild populations. They are fallow deer, red deer, sambar, hog deer, rusa, and chital. Red deer were introduced into New Zealand in 1851 from English and Scottish stock. Many have been domesticated in deer farms since the late 1960s and are common farm animals there now. Seven other species of deer were introduced into New Zealand but none are as widespread as red deer.

== Description ==
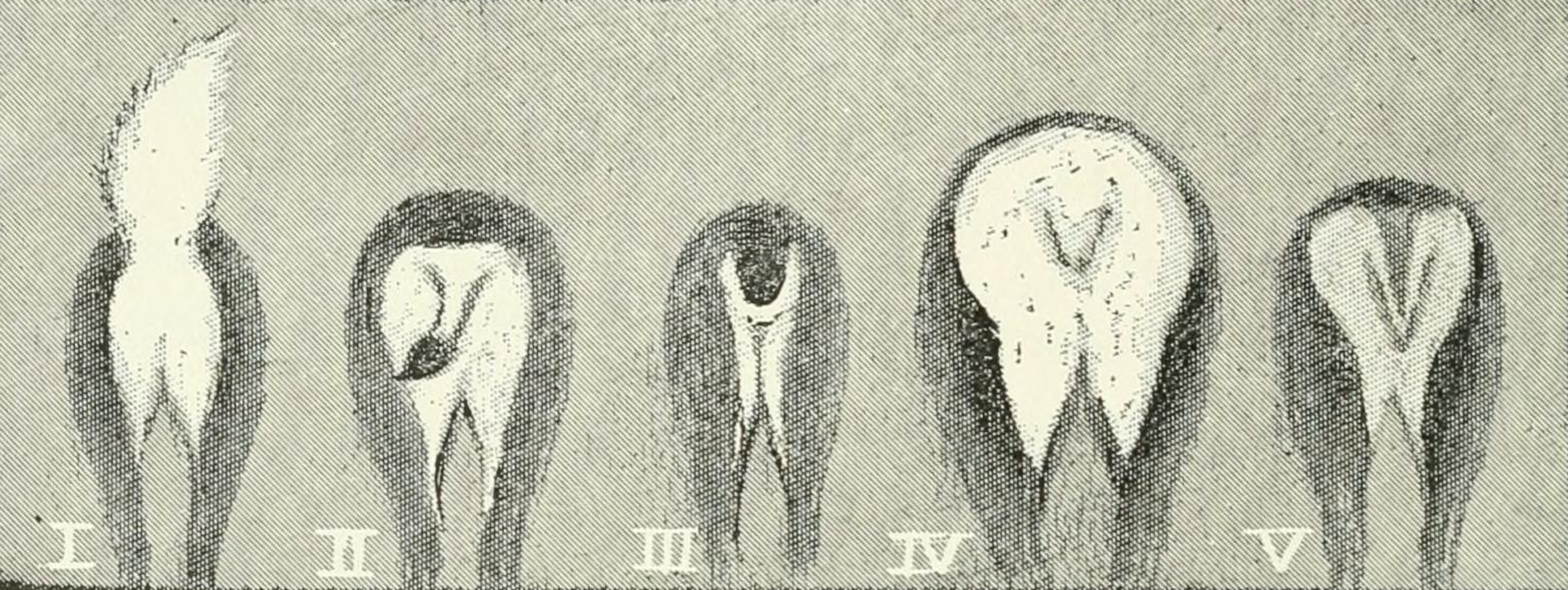
Deer tails: 1. White-tailed deer; 2. Mule deer; 3. Black-tailed deer; 4. Elk; 5. Red deer

Deer constitute the second most diverse family of artiodactyla after bovids. Though of a similar build, deer are strongly distinguished from antelopes by their antlers, which are temporary and regularly regrown unlike the permanent horns of bovids. Characteristics typical of deer include long, powerful legs, a diminutive tail and long ears. Deer exhibit a broad variation in physical proportions. The largest extant deer is the moose, which is nearly 2.6 metres (8 ft 6 in) tall and weighs up to 800 kilograms (1,800 lb). The elk stands 1.4–2 metres (4 ft 7 in – 6 ft 7 in) at the shoulder and weighs 240–450 kilograms (530–990 lb). The northern pudu is the smallest deer in the world; it reaches merely 32–35 centimetres (12 1/2–14 in) at the shoulder and weighs 3.3–6 kilograms (7 1/4–13 1/4 lb). The southern pudu is only slightly taller and heavier. Sexual dimorphism is quite pronounced – in most species males tend to be larger than females, and, except for the reindeer, only males have antlers.

Coat colour generally varies between red and brown, though it can be as dark as chocolate brown in the tufted deer or have a grayish tinge as in elk. Different species of brocket deer vary from gray to reddish brown in coat colour. Several species such as the chital, the fallow deer and the sika deer feature white spots on a brown coat. Coat of reindeer shows notable geographical variation. Deer undergo two moults in a year; for instance, in red deer the red, thin-haired summer coat is gradually replaced by the dense, greyish brown winter coat in autumn, which in turn gives way to the summer coat in the following spring. Moulting is affected by the photoperiod.

Deer are also excellent jumpers and swimmers. Deer are ruminants, or cud-chewers, and have a four-chambered stomach. Some deer, such as those on the island of Rùm, consume meat when it is available.

Nearly all deer have a facial gland in front of each eye. The gland contains a strongly scented pheromone, used to mark its home range. Bucks of a wide range of species open these glands wide when angry or excited. All deer have a liver without a gallbladder. Deer also have a tapetum lucidum, which gives them sufficiently good night vision.

=== Antlers ===
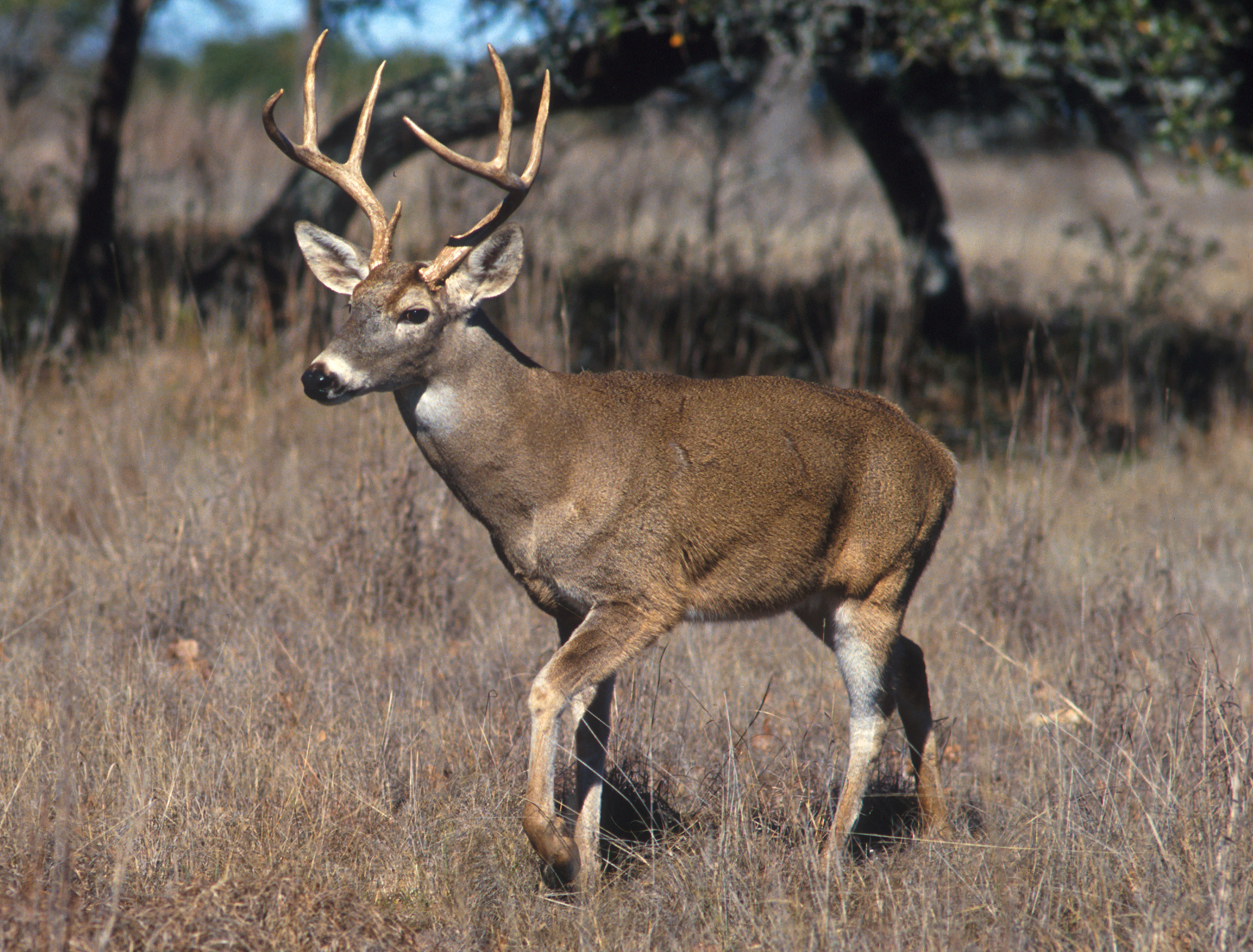
White-tailed deer

All male deer have antlers, with the exception of the water deer, in which males have long tusk-like canines that reach below the lower jaw. Females generally lack antlers, though female reindeer bear antlers smaller and less branched than those of the males. Occasionally females in other species may develop antlers, especially in telemetacarpal deer such as European roe deer, red deer, white-tailed deer and mule deer and less often in plesiometacarpal deer. A study of antlered female white-tailed deer noted that antlers tend to be small and malformed, and are shed frequently around the time of parturition.

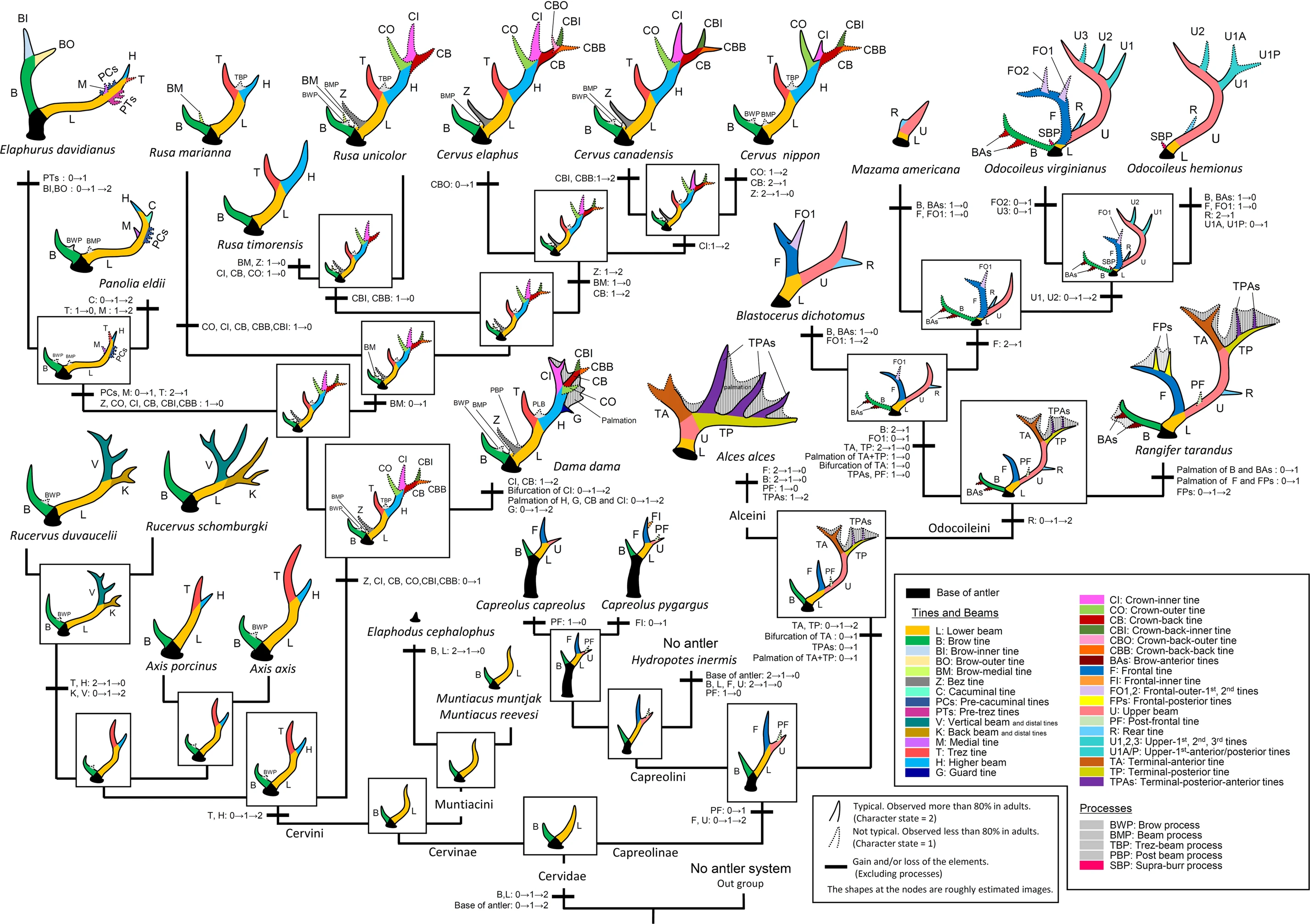
Antler phylogenetics

The fallow deer and the various subspecies of the reindeer have the largest as well as the heaviest antlers, both in absolute terms as well as in proportion to body mass (an average of eight grams per kilogram of body mass); the tufted deer, on the other hand, has the smallest antlers of all deer, while the pudú has the lightest antlers with respect to body mass (0.6 g per kilogram of body mass). The structure of antlers show considerable variation; while fallow deer and elk antlers are palmate (with a broad central portion), white-tailed deer antlers include a series of tines sprouting upward from a forward-curving main beam, and those of the pudú are mere spikes. Antler development begins from the pedicel, a bony structure that appears on the top of the skull by the time the animal is a year old. The pedicel gives rise to a spiky antler the following year, which is replaced by a branched antler in the third year. This process of losing a set of antlers to develop a larger and more branched set continues for the rest of the life. The antlers emerge as soft tissues (known as velvet antlers) and progressively harden into bony structures (known as hard antlers), following mineralisation and blockage of blood vessels in the tissue, from the tip to the base.

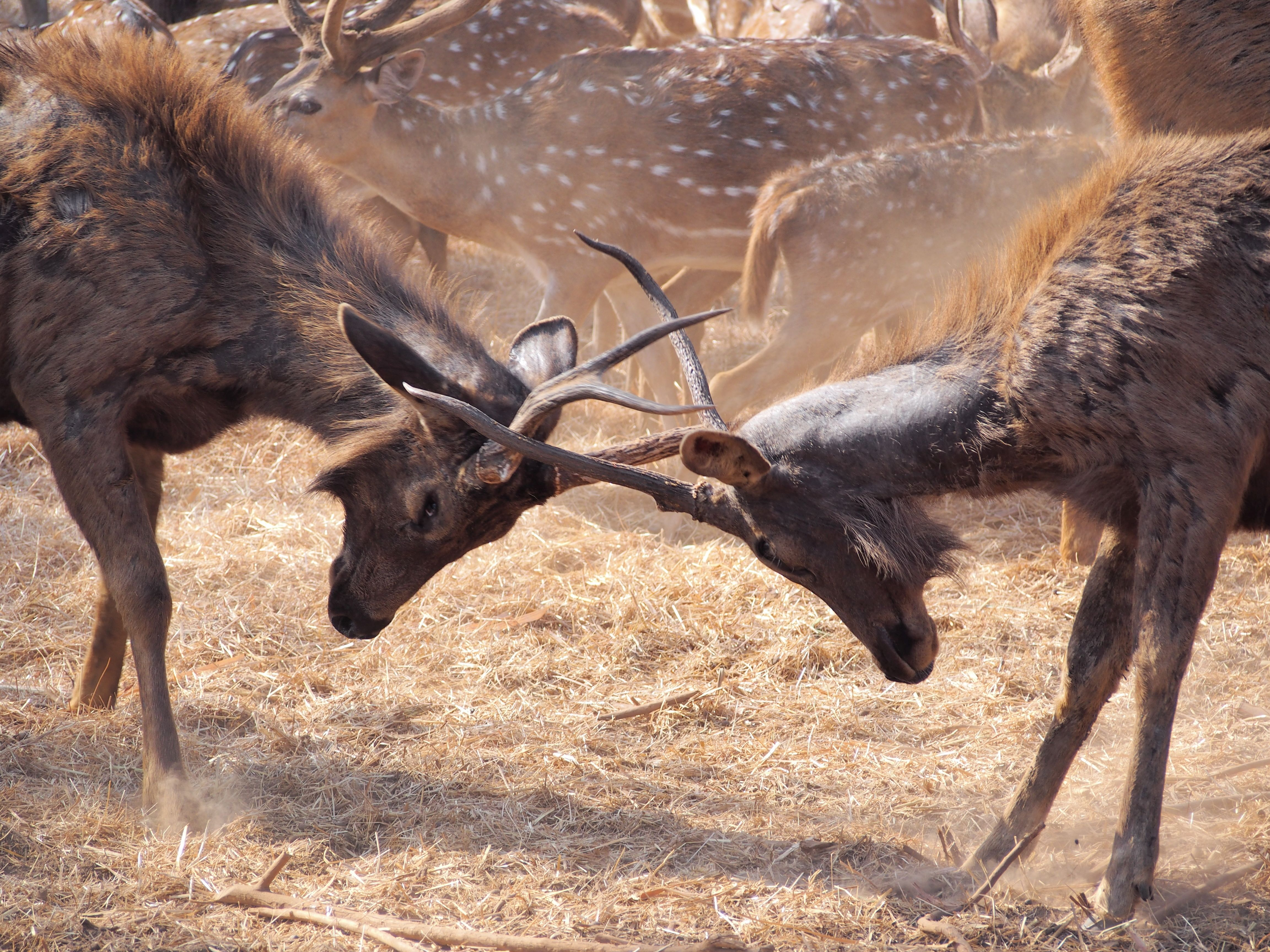
Two Sambar deer fighting, Silvassa, India

Antlers might be one of the most exaggerated male secondary sexual characteristics, and are intended primarily for reproductive success through sexual selection and for combat. The tines (forks) on the antlers create grooves that allow another male's antlers to lock into place. This allows the males to wrestle without risking injury to the face. Antlers are correlated to an individual's position in the social hierarchy and its behaviour. For instance, the heavier the antlers, the higher the individual's status in the social hierarchy, and the greater the delay in shedding the antlers; males with larger antlers tend to be more aggressive and dominant over others. Antlers can be an honest signal of genetic quality; males with larger antlers relative to body size tend to have increased resistance to pathogens and higher reproductive capacity.

In elk in Yellowstone National Park, antlers also provide protection against predation by wolves.

Homology of tines, that is, the branching structure of antlers among species, have been discussed before the 1900s. Recently, a new method to describe the branching structure of antlers and determining homology of tines was developed.

=== Teeth ===
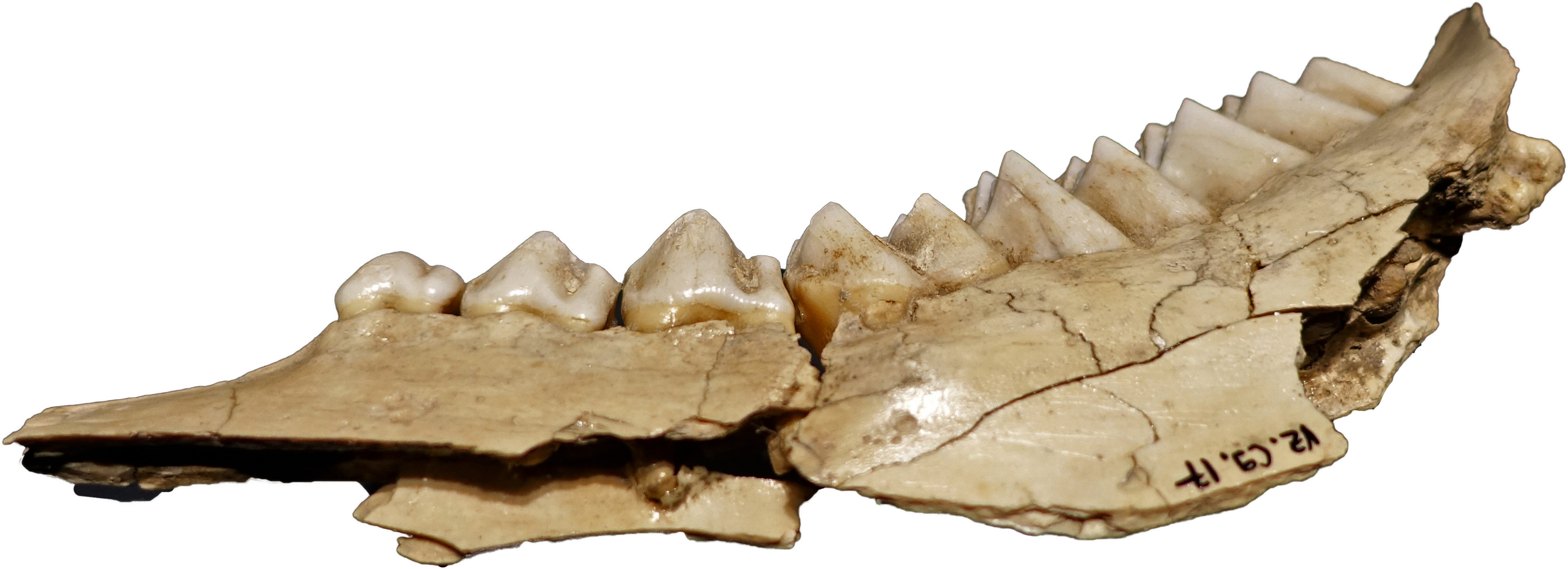
An example of a deer's mandible and teeth

Most deer bear 32 teeth; the corresponding dental formula is: 0.0.3.33.1.3.3. The elk and the reindeer may be exceptions, as they may retain their upper canines and thus have 34 teeth (dental formula: 0.1.3.33.1.3.3). The Chinese water deer, tufted deer, and muntjac have enlarged upper canine teeth forming sharp tusks, while other species often lack upper canines altogether. The cheek teeth of deer have crescent ridges of enamel, which enable them to grind a wide variety of vegetation. The teeth of deer are adapted to feeding on vegetation, and like other ruminants, they lack upper incisors, instead having a tough pad at the front of their upper jaw.

== Biology ==
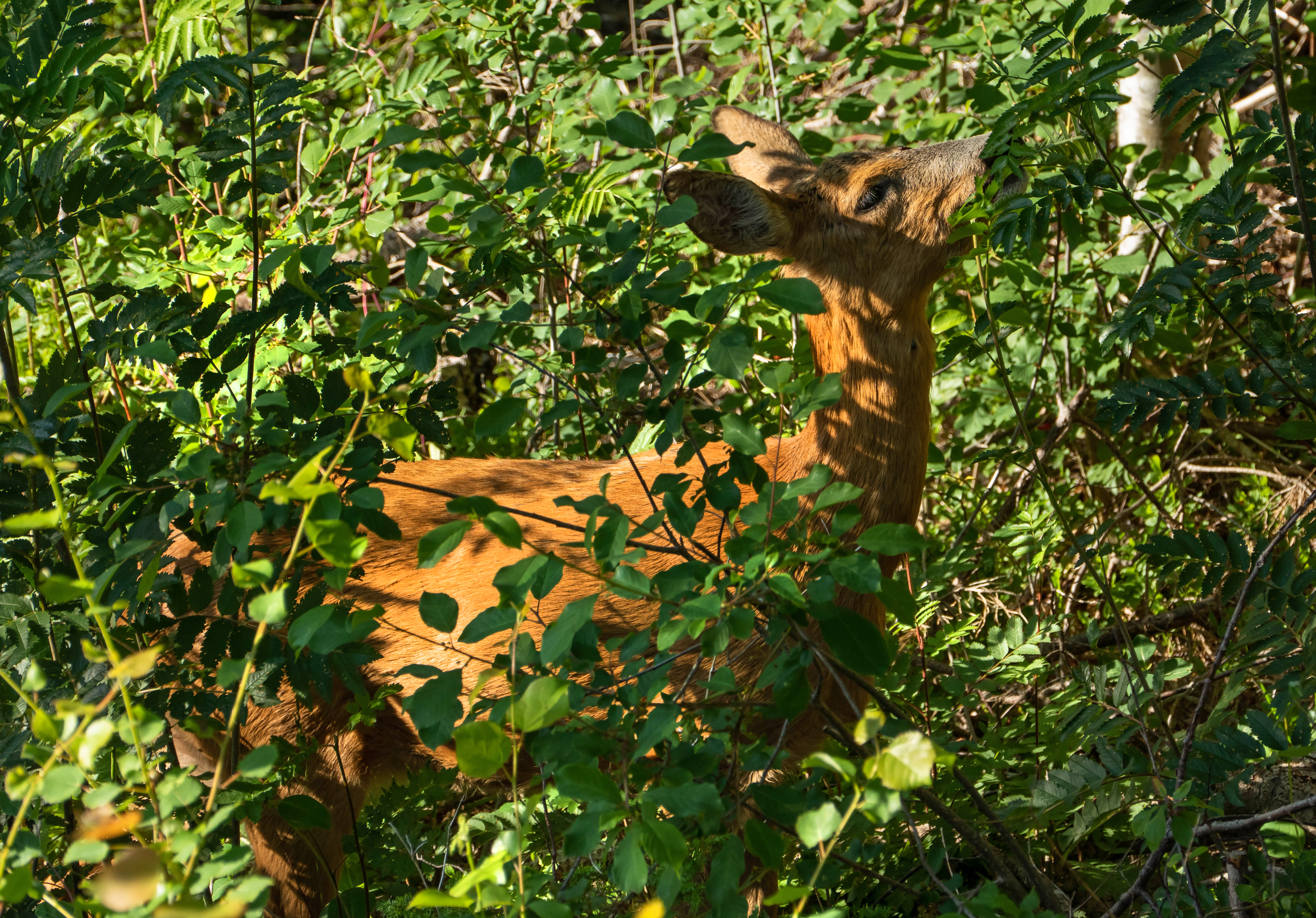
A Roe deer browsing tree leaves in Brastad, Sweden

=== Diet ===
Deer are browsers, and feed primarily on foliage of grasses, sedges, forbs, shrubs and trees, secondarily on lichens in northern latitudes during winter. They have small, unspecialized stomachs by ruminant standards, and high nutrition requirements. Rather than eating and digesting vast quantities of low-grade fibrous food as, for example, sheep and cattle do, deer select easily digestible shoots, young leaves, fresh grasses, soft twigs, fruit, fungi, and lichens. The low-fibered food, after minimal fermentation and shredding, passes rapidly through the alimentary canal. The deer require a large amount of minerals such as calcium and phosphate in order to support antler growth, and this further necessitates a nutrient-rich diet. There are some reports of deer engaging in carnivorous activity, such as eating dead alewives along lakeshores or depredating the nests of northern bobwhites.

=== Reproduction ===
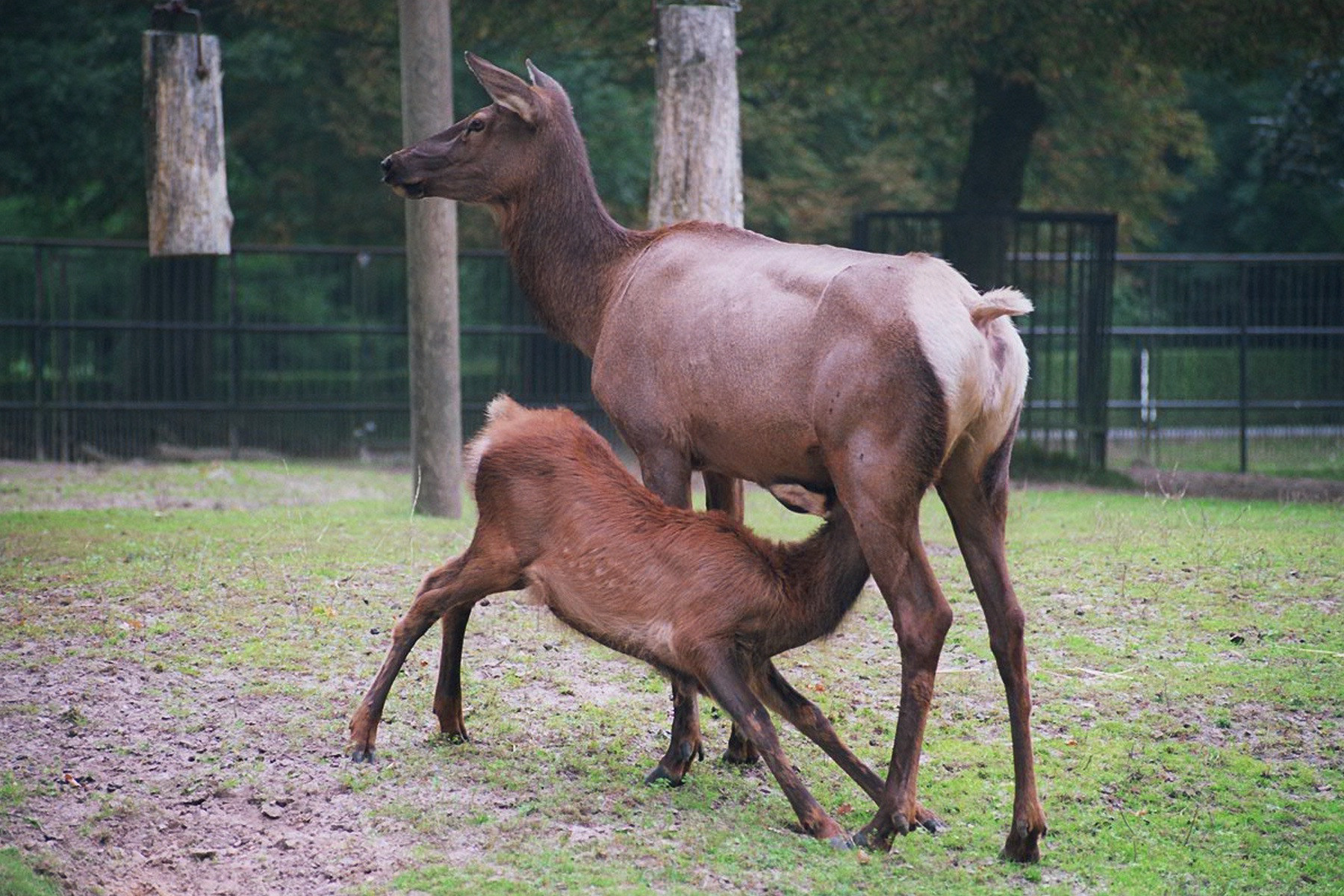
Female elk nursing young

Nearly all cervids are so-called uniparental species: the young, known in most species as fawns, are only cared for by the mother, most often called a doe. A doe generally has one or two fawns at a time (triplets, while not unknown, are uncommon). Mating season typically begins in later August and lasts until December. Some species mate until early March. The gestation period is anywhere up to ten months for the European roe deer. Most fawns are born with their fur covered with white spots, though in many species they lose these spots by the end of their first winter. In the first twenty minutes of a fawn's life, the fawn begins to take its first steps. Its mother licks it clean until it is almost free of scent, so predators will not find it. Its mother leaves often to graze, and the fawn does not like to be left behind. Sometimes its mother must gently push it down with her foot. The fawn stays hidden in the grass for one week until it is strong enough to walk with its mother. The fawn and its mother stay together for about one year. A male usually leaves and never sees his mother again, but females sometimes come back with their own fawns and form small herds.

=== Disease ===
In some areas of the UK, deer (especially fallow deer due to their gregarious behaviour) have been implicated as a possible reservoir for transmission of bovine tuberculosis, a disease which in the UK in 2005 cost £90 million in attempts to eradicate. In New Zealand, deer are thought to be important as vectors picking up M. bovis in areas where brushtail possums Trichosurus vulpecula are infected, and transferring it to previously uninfected possums when their carcasses are scavenged elsewhere. The white-tailed deer Odocoileus virginianus has been confirmed as the sole maintenance host in the Michigan outbreak of bovine tuberculosis which remains a significant barrier to the US nationwide eradication of the disease in livestock. Moose and deer can carry rabies.

Docile moose may suffer from brain worm (Parelaphostrongylus tenuis), a helminth which drills holes through the brain in its search for a suitable place to lay its eggs. White-tailed deer are generally asymptomatic carriers and are the definitive host of the nematode, whose adult form resides in the meninges of the deer's central nervous system. The larvae pass through the digestive system and are excreted in the feces after being coughed up out of the lungs. The parasite does not develop normally in moose and elk who ingest snails and slugs—the nematode's intermediate host—and instead passes into the brain where damage is done that is externally apparent, both in behaviour and in gait.

Deer, elk and moose in North America may suffer from chronic wasting disease, which was identified at a Colorado laboratory in the 1960s and is believed to be a prion disease. Out of an abundance of caution hunters are advised to avoid contact with specified risk material (SRM) such as the brain, spinal column or lymph nodes. Deboning the meat when butchering and sanitizing the knives and other tools used to butcher are amongst other government recommendations.

== Evolution ==
Deer are believed to have evolved from antlerless, tusked ancestors that resembled modern duikers and diminutive deer in the early Eocene, and gradually developed into the first antlered cervoids (the superfamily of cervids and related extinct families) in the Miocene. Eventually, with the development of antlers, the tusks as well as the upper incisors disappeared. Thus, evolution of deer took nearly 30 million years. Biologist Valerius Geist suggests evolution to have occurred in stages. There are not many prominent fossils to trace this evolution, but only fragments of skeletons and antlers that might be confused with false antlers of non-cervid species.

=== Eocene ===
The ruminants, ancestors of the Cervidae, are believed to have evolved from Diacodexis, the earliest known artiodactyl (even-toed ungulate), 50–55 Mya in the Eocene. Diacodexis, nearly the size of a rabbit, featured the talus bone characteristic of all modern even-toed ungulates. This ancestor and its relatives occurred throughout North America and Eurasia, but were on the decline by at least 46 Mya. Analysis of a nearly complete skeleton of Diacodexis discovered in 1982 gave rise to speculation that this ancestor could be closer to the non-ruminants than the ruminants. Andromeryx is another prominent prehistoric ruminant, but appears to be closer to the tragulids.

=== Oligocene ===
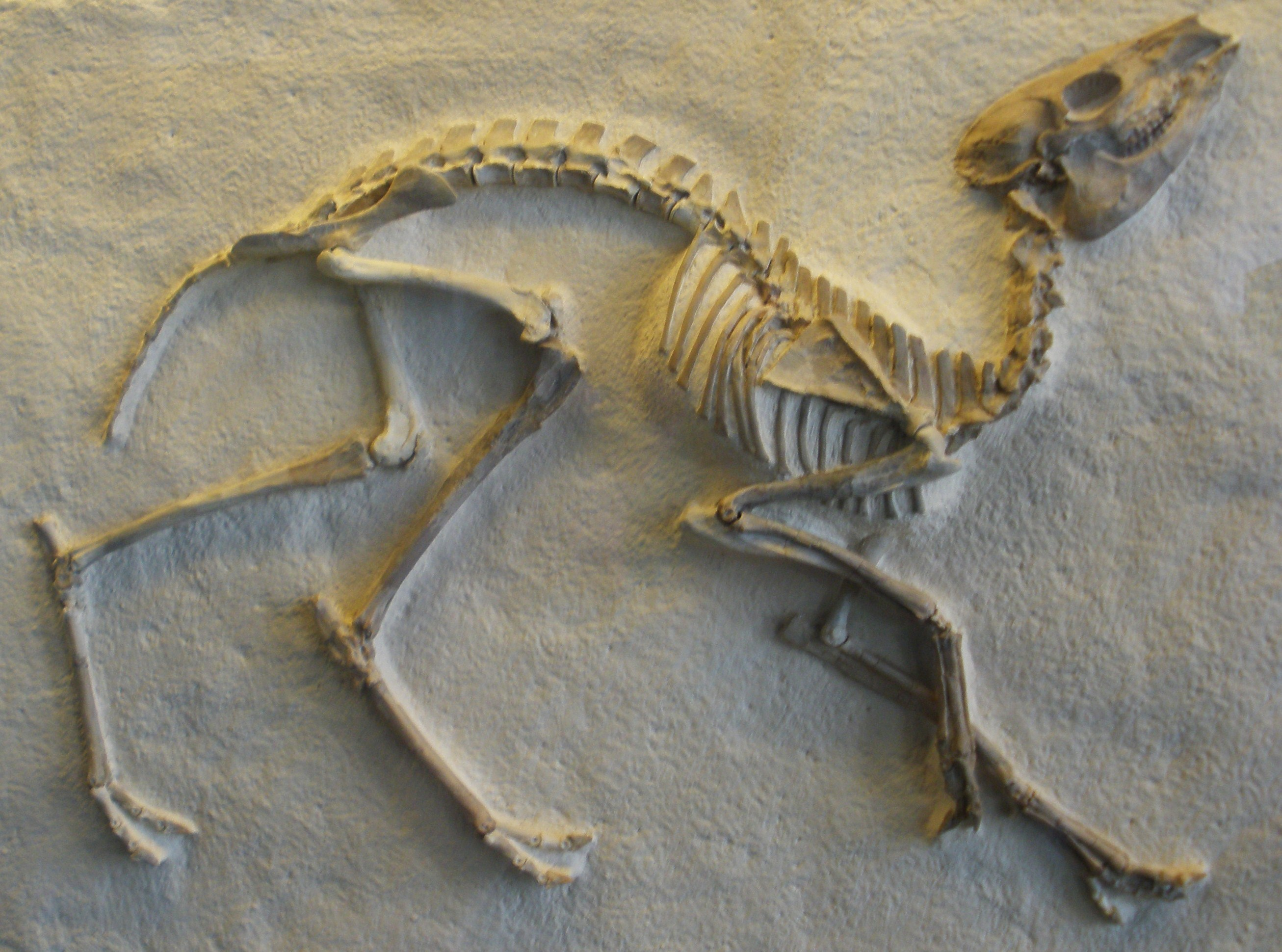
Leptomeryx

The formation of the Himalayas and the Alps brought about significant geographic changes. This was the chief reason behind the extensive diversification of deer-like forms and the emergence of cervids from the Oligocene to the early Pliocene. The latter half of the Oligocene (28–34 Mya) saw the appearance of the European Eumeryx and the North American Leptomeryx. The latter resembled modern-day bovids and cervids in dental morphology (for instance, it had brachyodont molars), while the former was more advanced. Other deer-like forms included the North American Blastomeryx and the European Dremotherium; these sabre-toothed animals are believed to have been the direct ancestors of all modern antlered deer, though they themselves lacked antlers. Another contemporaneous form was the four-horned protoceratid Protoceras, that was replaced by Syndyoceras in the Miocene; these animals were unique in having a horn on the nose. Late Eocene fossils dated approximately 35 million years ago, which were found in North America, show that Syndyoceras had bony skull outgrowths that resembled non-deciduous antlers.

=== Miocene ===
Fossil evidence suggests that the earliest members of the superfamily Cervoidea appeared in Eurasia in the Miocene. Dicrocerus, Euprox and Heteroprox were probably the first antlered cervids. Dicrocerus featured single-forked antlers that were shed regularly. Stephanocemas had more developed and diffuse ("crowned") antlers. Procervulus (Palaeomerycidae) also had antlers that were not shed. Contemporary forms such as the merycodontines eventually gave rise to the modern pronghorn.

The Cervinae emerged as the first group of extant cervids around 7–9 Mya, during the late Miocene in central Asia. The tribe Muntiacini made its appearance as † Muntiacus leilaoensis around 7–8 Mya; The early muntjacs varied in size–as small as hares or as large as fallow deer. They had tusks for fighting and antlers for defence. Capreolinae followed soon after; Alceini appeared 6.4–8.4 Mya. Around this period, the Tethys Ocean disappeared to give way to vast stretches of grassland; these provided the deer with abundant protein-rich vegetation that led to the development of ornamental antlers and allowed populations to flourish and colonise areas. As antlers had become pronounced, the canines were either lost or became poorly represented (as in elk), probably because diet was no longer browse-dominated and antlers were better display organs. In muntjac and tufted deer, the antlers as well as the canines are small. The tragulids have long canines to this day.

=== Pliocene ===
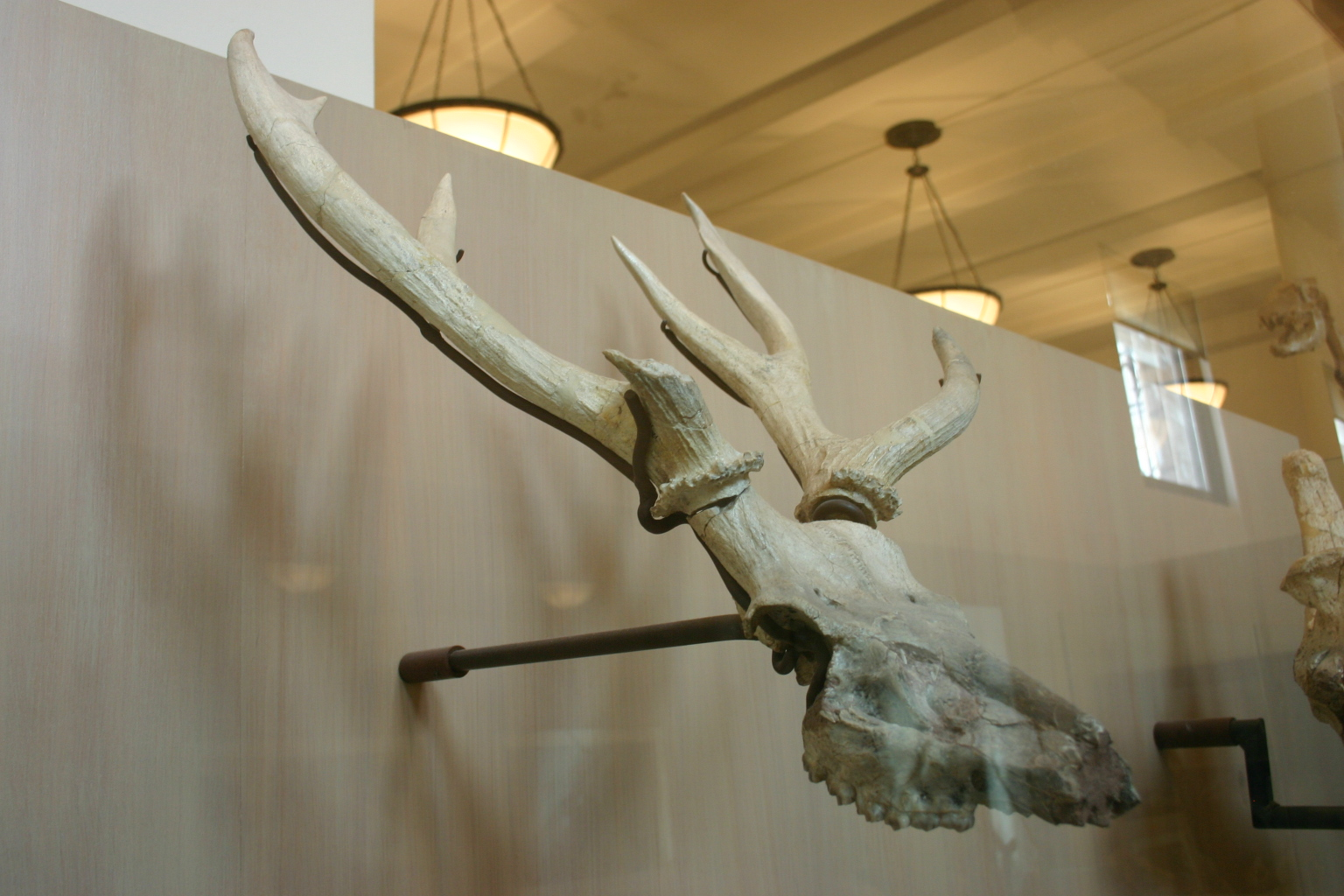
Cervocerus novorossiae

With the onset of the Pliocene, the global climate became cooler. A fall in the sea-level led to massive glaciation; consequently, grasslands abounded in nutritious forage. Thus a new spurt in deer populations ensued. The oldest member of Cervini, † Cervocerus novorossiae, appeared around the transition from Miocene to Pliocene (4.2–6 Mya) in Eurasia; cervine fossils from early Pliocene to as late as the Pleistocene have been excavated in China and the Himalayas. While Cervus and Dama appeared nearly 3 Mya, Axis emerged during the late Pliocene–Pleistocene. The tribes Capreolini and Rangiferini appeared around 4–7 Mya.

Around 5 Mya, the rangiferina † Bretzia and † Eocoileus were the first cervids to reach North America. This implies the Bering Strait could be crossed during the late Miocene–Pliocene; this appears highly probable as the camelids migrated into Asia from North America around the same time. Deer invaded South America in the late Pliocene (2.5–3 Mya) as part of the Great American Interchange, thanks to the recently formed Isthmus of Panama, and emerged successful due to the small number of competing ruminants in the continent.

=== Pleistocene ===
Large deer with impressive antlers evolved during the early Pleistocene, probably as a result of abundant resources to drive evolution. The early Pleistocene cervid † Eucladoceros was comparable in size to the modern elk. † Megaloceros (Pliocene–Pleistocene) featured the Irish elk (M. giganteus), one of the largest known cervids. The Irish elk reached 2 metres (6 1/2 ft) at the shoulder and had heavy antlers that spanned 3.6 metres (11 ft 10 in) from tip to tip. These large animals were traditionally thought to have faced extinction due to conflict between sexual selection for large antlers and body and natural selection for a smaller form, but a combination of anthropogenic and climatic pressures is now thought to be the most likely culprit. Meanwhile, the moose and reindeer radiated into North America from Siberia.

== Taxonomy and classification ==
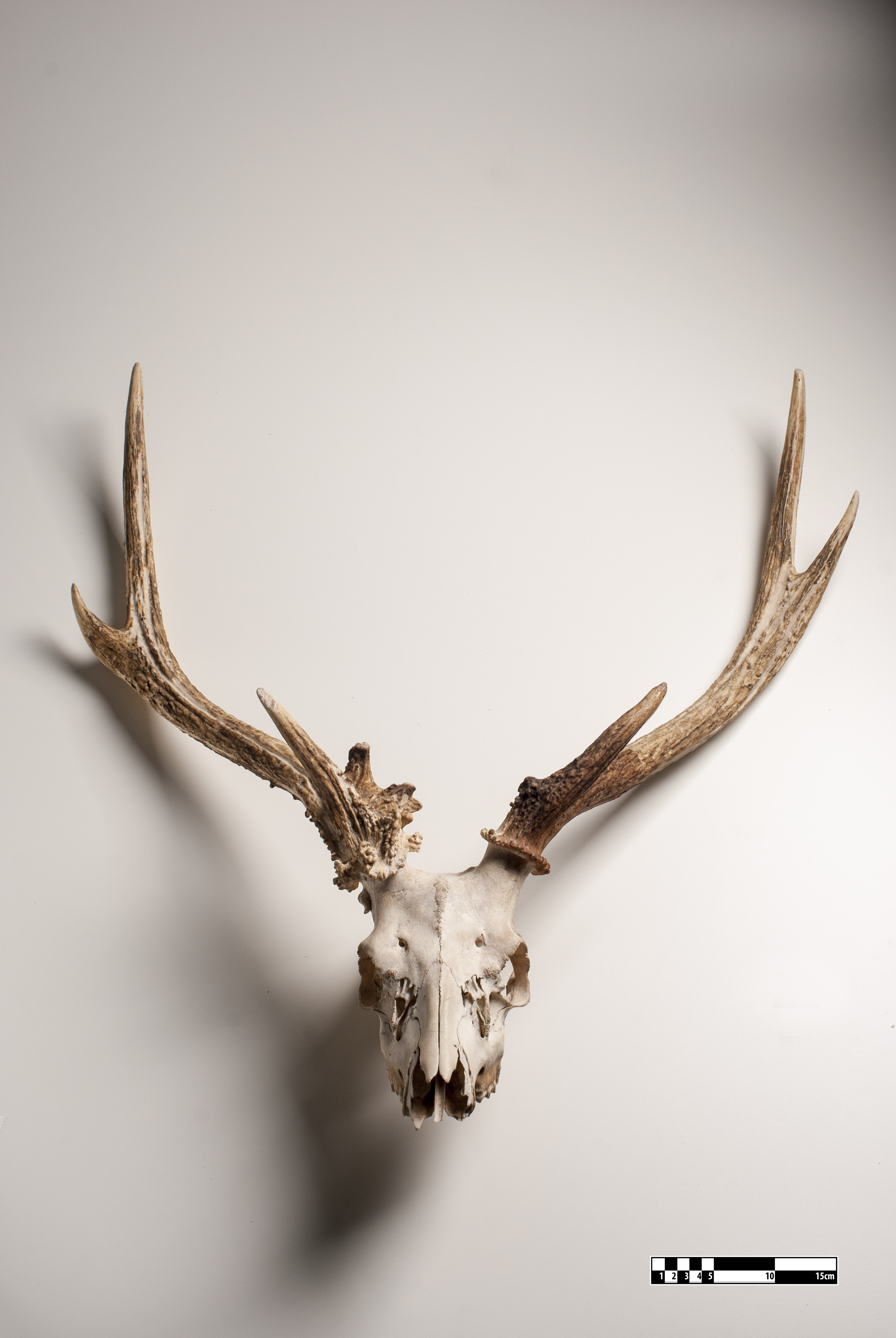
Cervid skull

Deer constitute the artiodactyl family Cervidae. This family was first described by German zoologist Georg August Goldfuss in Handbuch der Zoologie (1820). Three subfamilies were recognised: Capreolinae (first described by the English zoologist Joshua Brookes in 1828), Cervinae (described by Goldfuss) and Hydropotinae (first described by French zoologist Édouard Louis Trouessart in 1898).

Other attempts at the classification of deer have been based on morphological and genetic differences. The Anglo-Irish naturalist Victor Brooke suggested in 1878 that deer could be bifurcated into two classes on the according to the features of the second and fifth metacarpal bones of their forelimbs: Plesiometacarpalia (most Old World deer) and Telemetacarpalia (most New World deer). He treated the musk deer as a cervid, placing it under Telemetacarpalia. While the telemetacarpal deer showed only those elements located far from the joint, the plesiometacarpal deer retained the elements closer to the joint as well. Differentiation on the basis of diploid number of chromosomes in the late 20th century has been flawed by several inconsistencies.

In 1987, the zoologists Colin Groves and Peter Grubb identified three subfamilies: Cervinae, Hydropotinae and Odocoileinae; they noted that the hydropotines lack antlers, and the other two subfamilies differ in their skeletal morphology. They reverted from this classification in 2000.

Molecular phylogenetic analyses since the latter half of the 2000s all show that hydropotes is a sister taxon of Capreolus, and "Hydropotinae" became outdated subfamily.

=== External relationships ===
Until 2003, it was understood that the family Moschidae (musk deer) was sister to Cervidae. Then a phylogenetic study by Alexandre Hassanin (of National Museum of Natural History, France) and colleagues, based on mitochondrial and nuclear analyses, revealed that Moschidae and Bovidae form a clade sister to Cervidae. According to the study, Cervidae diverged from the Bovidae-Moschidae clade 27 to 28 million years ago. The following cladogram is based on the 2003 study.

- Ruminantia
  - Tragulina
    Tragulidae
  - Pecora
    - Antilocapridae
    - Giraffidae
    - - Cervidae
      - - Bovidae
        - Moschidae

=== Internal relationships ===
A 2006 phylogenetic study of the internal relationships in Cervidae by Clément Gilbert and colleagues divided the family into two major clades: Capreolinae (telemetacarpal or New World deer) and Cervinae (plesiometacarpal or Old World deer). Studies in the late 20th century suggested a similar bifurcation in the family. This as well as previous studies support monophyly in Cervinae, while Capreolinae appears paraphyletic. The 2006 study identified two lineages in Cervinae, Cervini (comprising the genera Axis, Cervus, Dama and Rucervus) and Muntiacini (Muntiacus and Elaphodus). Capreolinae featured three lineages, Alceini (Alces species), Capreolini (Capreolus and the subfamily Hydropotinae) and Odocoileini (Blastocerus, Hippocamelus, Mazama, Odocoileus, Pudu and Rangifer species). The following cladogram is based on the 2006 study.

- Cervidae
  - Cervinae (Old World deer)
    - Muntiacini
      - Reeves's muntjac
      - Tufted deer
    - Cervini
      - - - Common fallow deer
          - Persian fallow deer
        - - - - Rusa
              - Sambar
            - - Red deer
              - Thorold's deer
              - Sika deer
              - Elk (Wapiti)
          - - Eld's deer
            - Père David's deer
      - - Barasingha
        - - Indian hog deer
          - Chital
  - Capreolinae (New World deer)
    - Odocoileini
      - Reindeer (Caribou)
      - - - American red brocket
          - - White-tailed deer
            - Mule deer
        - - Marsh deer
          - Gray brocket
          - Southern pudu
          - Taruca
    - Capreolini
      - Roe deer
      - Water deer
    - Alceini
      Moose or Eurasian elk

== Human interaction ==
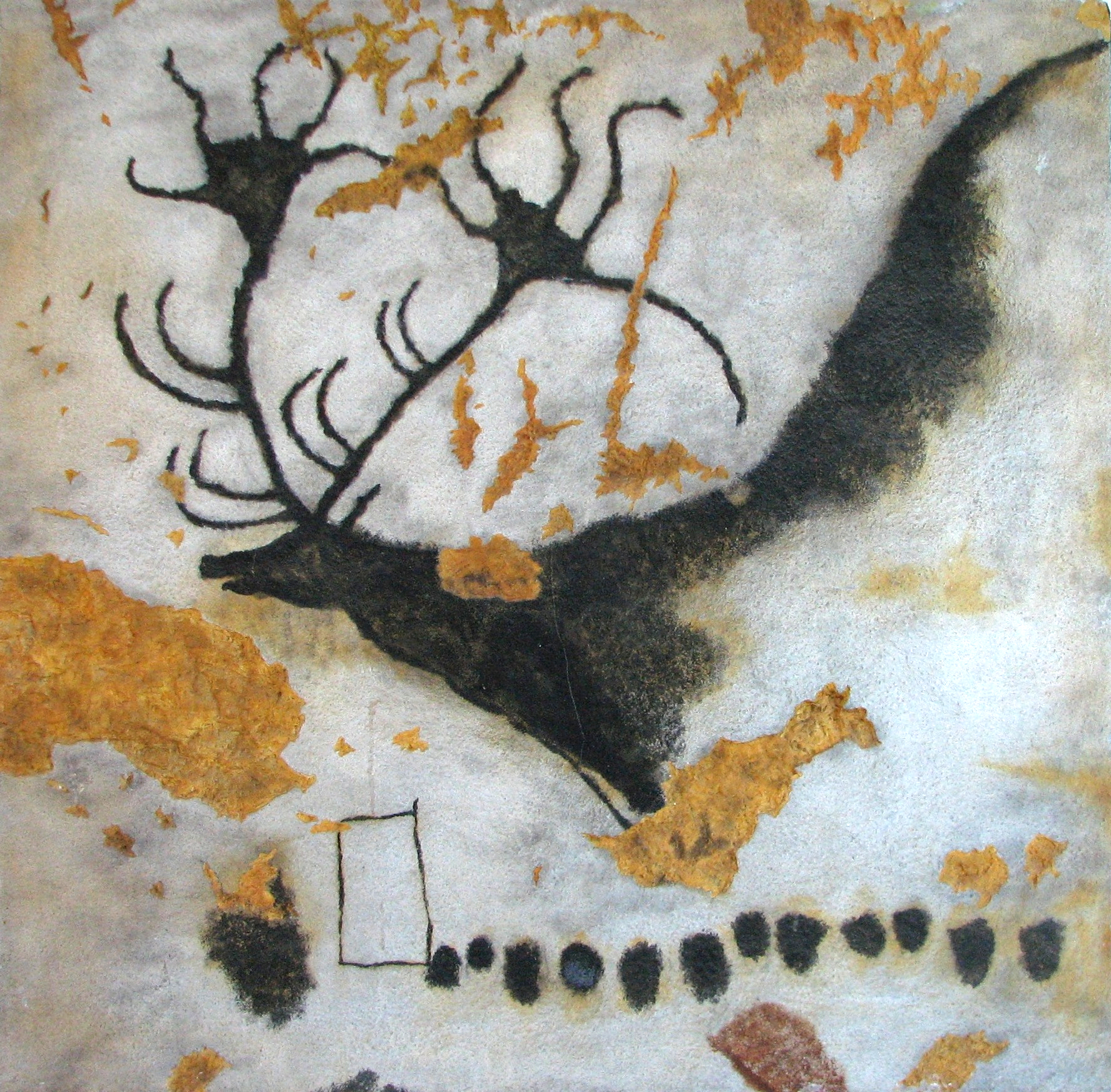
Upper Palaeolithic cave painting of a Megaloceros giant deer at Lascaux, 17,300 years old

=== Prehistoric ===
Deer were an important source of food for early hominids. In China, Homo erectus fed upon the sika deer, while the red deer was hunted in Germany. In the Upper Palaeolithic, the reindeer was the staple food for Cro-Magnon people, while the cave paintings at Lascaux in southwestern France include some 90 images of stags. In China, deer continued to be a main source of food for millennia even after people began farming, and it is possible that sika and other deer benefited from the frequently abandoned field sites.

=== Historic ===
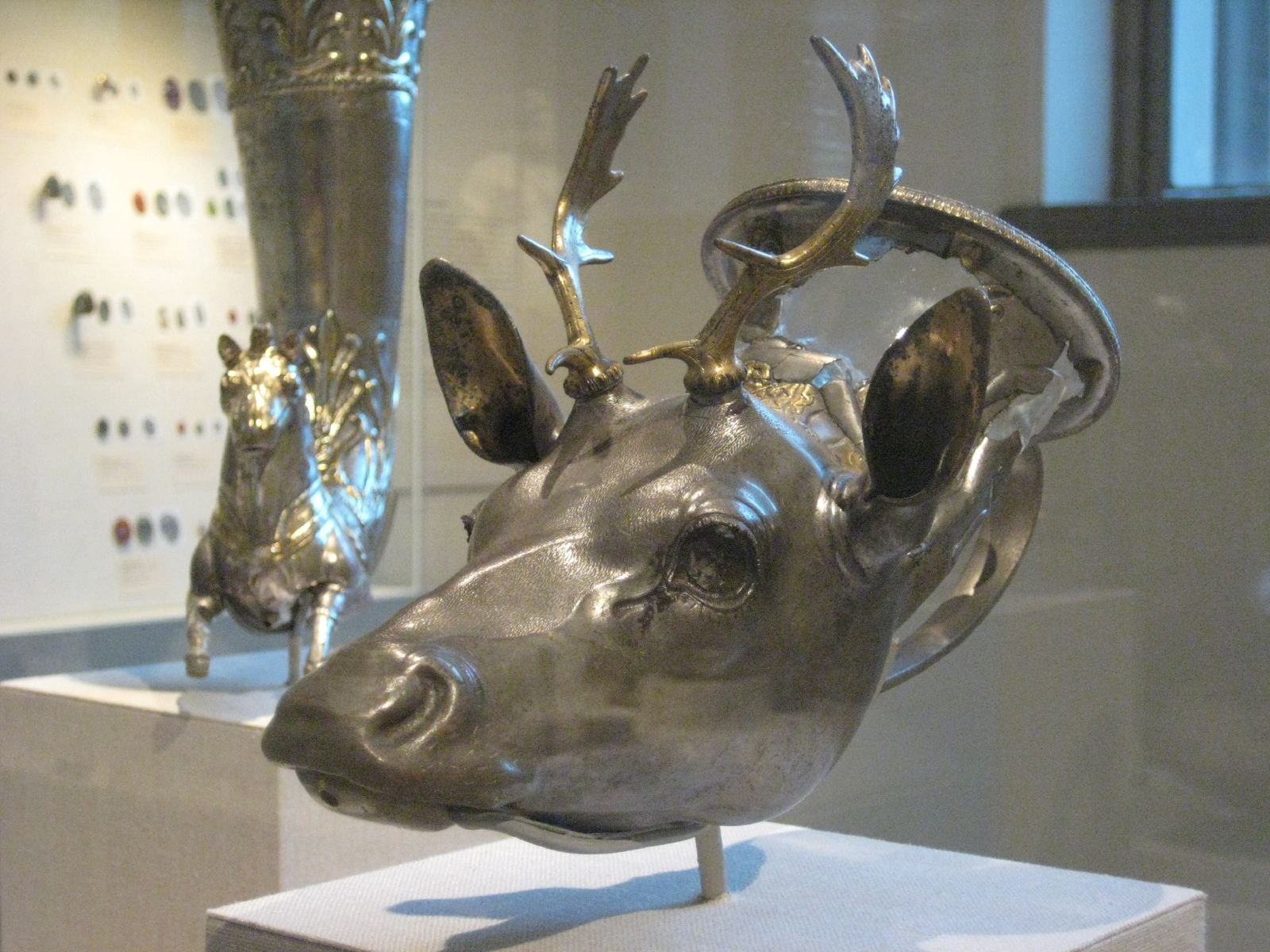
Ancient Greek gilt-silver rhyton, 4th century BC

Deer had a central role in the ancient art, culture and mythology of various peoples including the Hittites, the ancient Egyptians, the Celts, the ancient Greeks, and certain East Asian cultures. For instance, the Stag Hunt Mosaic of ancient Pella, under the Kingdom of Macedonia (4th century BC), possibly depicts Alexander the Great hunting a deer with Hephaestion. In Japanese Shintoism, the sika deer is believed to be a messenger to the gods. In China, deer are associated with great medicinal significance; deer penis is thought by some in China to have aphrodisiac properties. Spotted deer are believed in China to accompany the god of longevity. Deer was the principal sacrificial animal for the Huichal Indians of Mexico. In medieval Europe, deer appeared in hunting scenes and coats-of-arms. Deer are depicted in many materials by various pre-Hispanic civilizations in the Andes. The Shawnees believed that deer possessed souls.

The common male given name Oscar is taken from the Irish Language, where it is derived from two elements: the first, os, means "deer"; the second element, cara, means "friend". The name is borne by a famous hero of Irish mythology—Oscar, grandson of Fionn Mac Cumhail. The name was popularised in the 18th century by James Macpherson, creator of 'Ossianic poetry'.

=== Literary ===
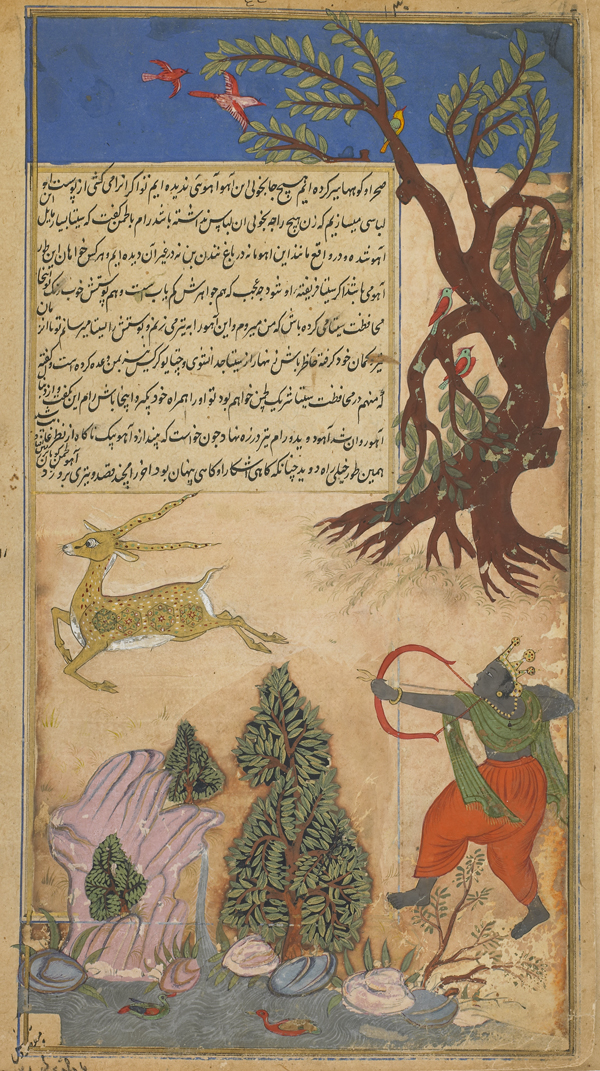
In the Indian epic Ramayana, Rama kills the illusional golden deer

Deer have been an integral part of fables and other literary works since the inception of writing. Stags were used as symbols in the latter Sumerian writings. For instance, the boat of Sumerian god Enki is named the Stag of Azbu. There are several mentions of the animal in the Rigveda as well as the Bible. In the Indian epic Ramayana, Sita is lured by a golden deer which Rama tries to catch. In the absence of both Rama and Lakshman, Ravana kidnaps Sita. Many of the allegorical Aesop's fables, such as "The Stag at the Pool", "The One-Eyed Doe" and "The Stag and a Lion", personify deer to give moral lessons. For instance, "The Sick Stag" gives the message that uncaring friends can do more harm than good. The Yaqui deer song accompanies the deer dance which is performed by a pascola [from the Spanish 'pascua', Easter] dancer (also known as a deer dancer). Pascolas would perform at religious and social functions many times of the year, especially during Lent and Easter.

In one of Rudolf Erich Raspe's 1785 stories of Baron Munchausen's Narrative of his Marvellous Travels and Campaigns in Russia, the baron encounters a stag while eating cherries and, without ammunition, fires the cherry-pits at the stag with his musket, but it escapes. The next year, the baron encounters a stag with a cherry tree growing from its head; presumably this is the animal he had shot at the previous year. In Christmas lore (such as in the narrative poem "A Visit from St. Nicholas"), reindeer are often depicted pulling the sleigh of Santa Claus. Marjorie Kinnan Rawlings's Pulitzer Prize-winning 1938 novel The Yearling was about a boy's relationship with a baby deer. The fiction book Fire Bringer is about a young fawn who goes on a quest to save the Herla, the deer kind. In the 1942 Walt Disney Pictures film, Bambi is a white-tailed deer, while in Felix Salten's original 1923 book Bambi, a Life in the Woods, he is a roe deer. In C. S. Lewis's 1950 fantasy novel The Lion, the Witch and the Wardrobe the adult Pevensies, now kings and queens of Narnia, chase the White Stag on a hunt, as the Stag is said to grant its captor a wish. The hunt is key in returning the Pevensies to their home in England. In the 1979 book The Animals of Farthing Wood, The Great White Stag is the leader of all the animals.

=== Heraldic ===
Arms of Raon-aux-Bois, France

Arms of Åland

Deer of various types appear frequently in European heraldry. In the British armory, the term "stag" is typically used to refer to antlered male red deer, while "buck" indicates an antlered male fallow deer. Stags and bucks appear in a number of attitudes, referred to as "lodged" when the deer is lying down, "trippant" when it has one leg raised, "courant" when it is running, "springing" when in the act of leaping, "statant" when it is standing with all hooves on the ground and looking ahead, and "at gaze" when otherwise statant but looking at the viewer. Stags' heads are also frequently used; these are typically portrayed without an attached neck and as facing the viewer, in which case they are termed "caboshed".

Examples of deer in coats of arms can be found in the arms of Hertfordshire, England, and its county town of Hertford; both are examples of canting arms. A deer appears on the arms of the Israeli Postal Authority. Coats of arms featuring deer include those of Baden-Württemberg, Dotternhausen, Thierachern, Friolzheim, Bauen, Albstadt, and Dassel in Germany; of the Earls Bathurst in England; of Balakhna, Gusev, Nizhny Novgorod, Odintsovo, Slavsk and Yamalo-Nenets in Russia; of Berezhany, Sambir in Ukraine; of Åland, Finland; of Gjemnes, Hitra, Hjartdal and Rendalen in Norway; of Jelenia Góra, Poland; of Umeå, Sweden; of Queensland, Australia; of Cervera, Catalonia; of Selonia and Semigallia in Latvia; and of Chile.

Other types of deer used in heraldry include the hind, portrayed much like the stag or buck but without antlers, as well as the reindeer and winged stags. Winged stags are used as supporters in the arms of the de Carteret family. The sea-stag, having the antlers, head, forelegs and upper body of a stag and the tail of a mermaid, is often found in German heraldry.

=== Economic ===
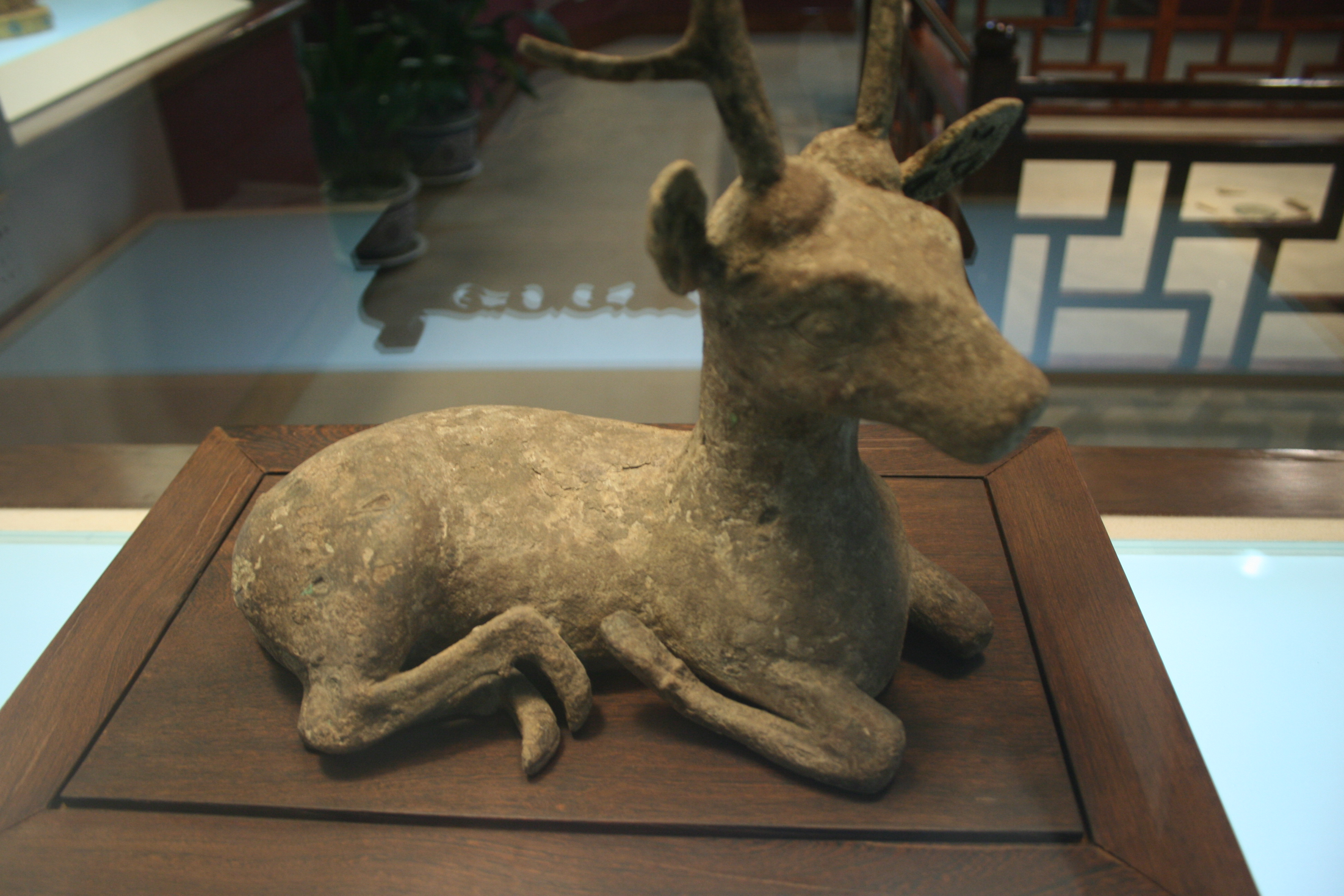
Bronze deer, Warring States period

Deer have long had economic significance to humans. Deer meat, known as venison, is highly nutritious. It can be obtained responsibly through the process of hunting deer in their natural habitat. Domestically, it is produced in small amounts compared to beef, but still represents a significant trade. Deer hunting is a popular activity in the U.S. that can provide the hunter's family with high quality meat and generates revenue for states and the federal government from the sales of licenses, permits and tags. The 2006 survey by the U.S. Fish and Wildlife Service estimates that license sales generate approximately $700 million annually. This revenue generally goes to support conservation efforts in the states where the licenses are purchased. Overall, the U.S. Fish and Wildlife Service estimates that big game hunting for deer and elk generates approximately $11.8 billion annually in hunting-related travel, equipment and related expenditures. Conservation laws prevent the sale of unlicensed wild game meat, although it may be donated.

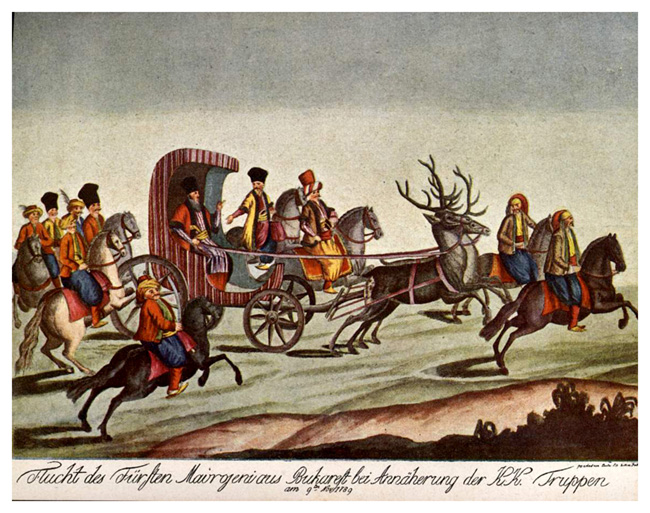
Nicholas Mavrogenes, Phanariote Prince of Wallachia, riding through Bucharest in a stag−drawn carriage. Late 1780s

Deer have often been bred in captivity as ornaments for parks, but only in the case of reindeer has thorough domestication succeeded. By 2012, some 25,000 tons of red deer were raised on farms in North America. The Sami of Scandinavia and the Kola Peninsula of Russia and other nomadic peoples of northern Asia use reindeer for food, clothing, and transport. Others are bred for hunting are selected based on the size of the antlers. The major deer-producing countries are New Zealand, the market leader, with Ireland, Great Britain and Germany. The trade earns over $100 million annually for these countries.

Automobile collisions with deer can impose a significant cost on the economy. In the U.S., about 1.5 million deer-vehicle collisions occur each year, according to the National Highway Traffic Safety Administration. Those accidents cause about 150 human deaths and $1.1 billion in property damage annually. In Scotland, several roads including the A82, the A87 and the A835 have had significant enough problems with deer vehicle collisions (DVCs) that sets of vehicle activated automatic warning signs have been installed along these roads.

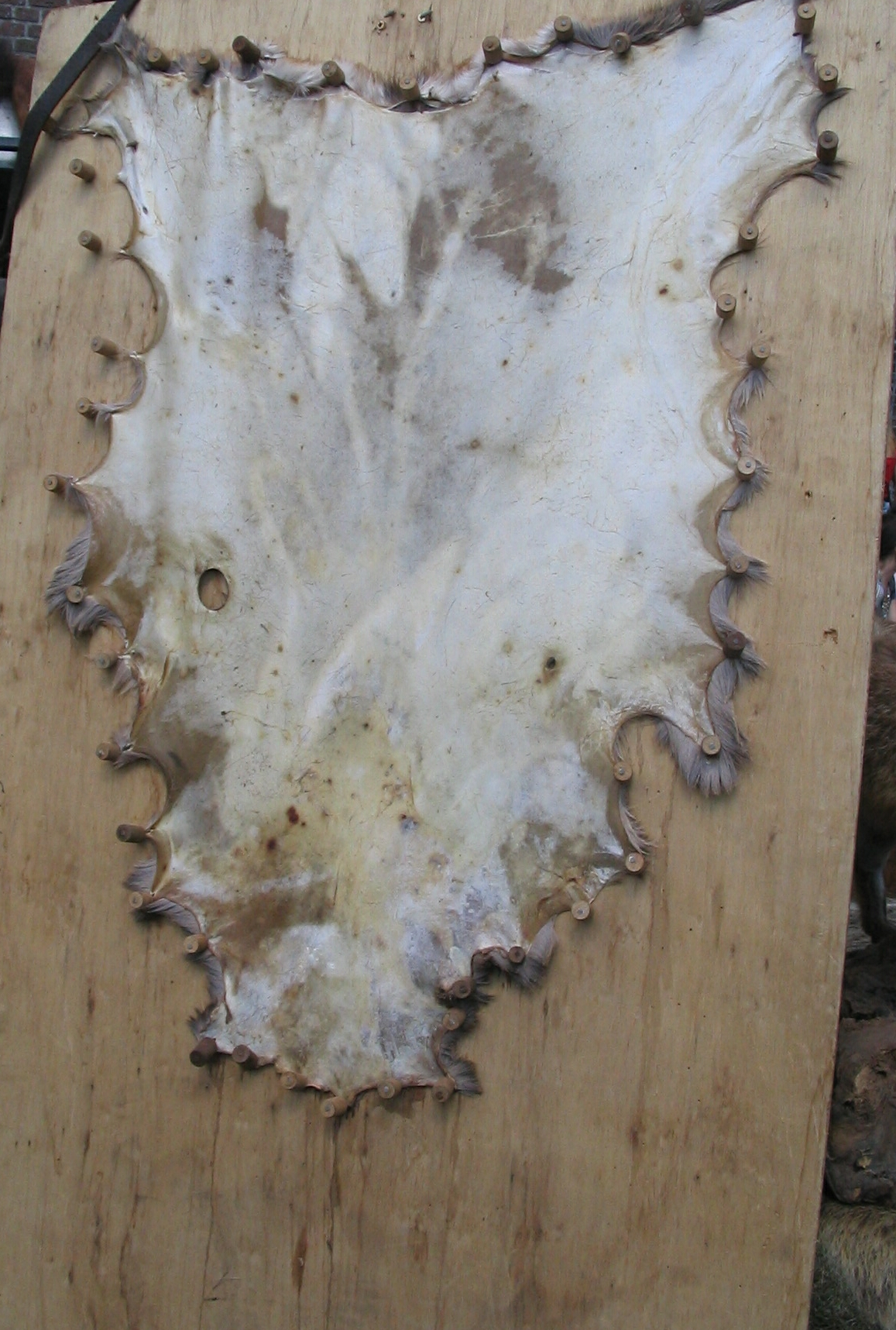
Leather side of a roe deer hide

The skins make a peculiarly strong, soft leather, known as buckskin. There is nothing special about skins with the fur still on since the hair is brittle and soon falls off. The hooves and antlers are used for ornamental purposes, especially the antlers of the roe deer, which are utilized for making umbrella handles, and for similar purposes; elk antlers is often employed in making knife handles. Among the Inuit, the traditional ulu women's knife was made with an antler or ivory handle. In China, a traditional chinese medicine is made from stag antler, and the antlers of certain species are eaten when "in the velvet". Antlers can also be boiled down to release the protein gelatin, which is used as a topical treatment for skin irritation and is also used in cooking.

Since the early 20th century, deer have become commonly thought of as pests in New Zealand due to a lack of predators on the island causing population numbers to increase and begin encroaching on more populated areas. They compete with livestock for resources, as well as cause excess erosion and wreak havoc on wild plant species and agriculture alike. They can also have an effect on the conservation efforts of other plant and animal species, as they can critically offset the balance within an environment by drastically depleting diversity within forests.

== See also ==
- Australian Deer Association
- Deer forest
- Deer management
- Largest cervids
- Reindeer hunting in Greenland
