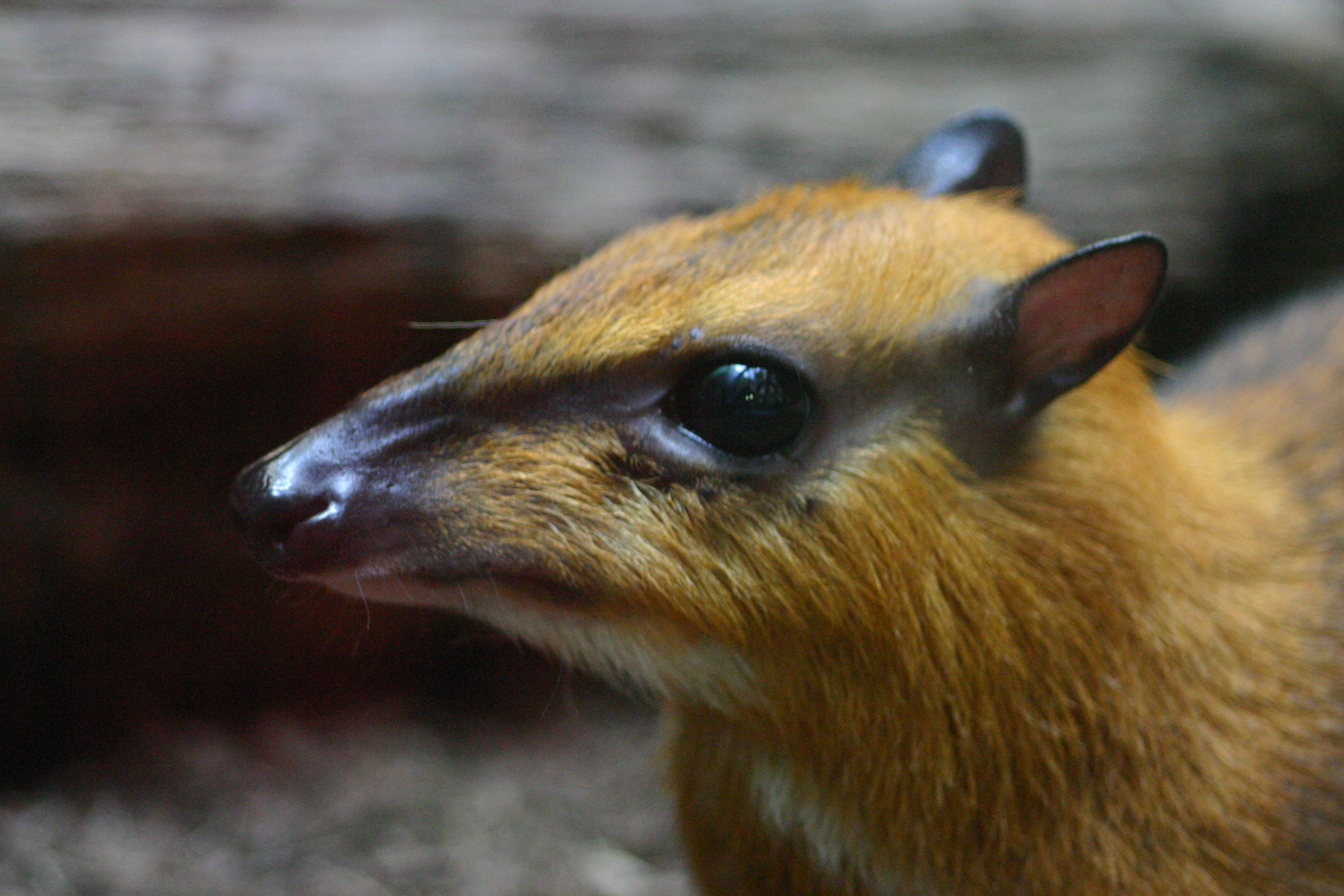
- Greater Mouse-deer (Tragulus napu)

Scientific classification
- Kingdom: Animalia
- Phylum: Chordata
- Class: Mammalia
- Infraclass: Placentalia
- Order: Artiodactyla
- Suborder: Ruminantia
- Infraorder: Tragulina; Flower, 1883

Families
- See text

= Tragulina =

Tragulina Temporal range: Early Eocene–Present

Infraorder of ungulates

Tragulina (also known as Traguliformes) is an infraorder of even-toed ungulates. Only the chevrotains survive to the present, including the genera Tragulus (the mouse deer) and Hyemoschus, all within the family Tragulidae.

== Taxonomy and classification ==
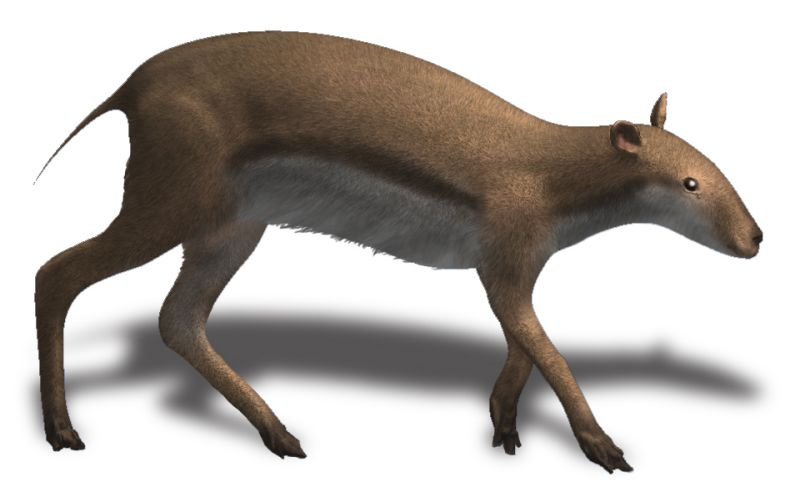
Leptomeryx

Tragulina is an infraorder within the larger suborder Ruminantia, and is the sister clade to the infraorder Pecora. Tragulina contains one extant (living) family, Tragulidae, as well as several extinct families, although the extinct members currently classified as within Tragulina causes it to be considered paraphyletic.

Tragulina's placement within Artiodactyla can be represented in the following cladogram:

- Artiodactyla
  - Tylopoda (camels)
  - Artiofabula
    - Suina (pigs)
    - Cetruminantia
      - Ruminantia (ruminants)
        - Tragulina
          Tragulidae (mouse deer)
        - Pecora (horn bearers)
      - Cetancodonta/Whippomorpha
        - Hippopotamidae (hippopotamuses)
        - Cetacea (whales)

The following is the taxonomy of the group Tragulina.

- Infrarorder Tragulina
  - Family †Praetragulidae
    - †Praetragulus
    - †Parvitragulus
    - †Simimeryx
  - Family †Archaeomerycidae
    - †Archaeomeryx
    - †Miomeryx
    - †Paukkaungmeryx
  - Family †Hypertragulidae
    - †Hypertragulus
    - †Nanotragulus
    - Subfamily †Hypisodontinae
      - †Hypisodus
  - Family †Leptomerycidae
    - †Hendryomeryx
    - †Leptomeryx
    - †Xinjiangmeryx
    - †Pseudomeryx
    - †Pseudoparablastomeryx
    - †Pronodens
  - Family †Lophiomerycidae
    - †Zhailimeryx
    - †Lophiomeryx
    - †Krabimeryx
  - Family †Gelocidae
  - Family †Bachitheriidae
    - †Bachitherium
  - Family Tragulidae – chevrotains or mouse-deer
    - Tragulus
    - Hyemoschus
    - Moschiola
    - †Dorcatherium
    - †Dorcabune
    - †Afrotragulus
    - †Siamotragulus
    - †Yunnanotherium
    - †Archaeotragulus
    - †Iberomeryx
    - †Nalameryx
