= Fanged deer =

Fanged deer may refer to several deer and deer-like ruminants with downward-pointing canine teeth or tusks, including:

- Cervidae (true deer)
  - Muntjacs (14 species, genus Muntiacus), native to South Asia and Southeast Asia; with the Reeves's muntjac an invasive species in the United Kingdom and Japan
  - Water deer (one species, Hydropotes inermis), native to China and Korea, and introduced to Europe
  - Tufted deer (one species, Elaphodus cephalophus), a close relative of the muntjacs native to central China and northeastern Myanmar
- Moschidae
  - Musk deer (seven species, genus Moschus), inhabiting South Asia, East Asia, and Siberia
- Tragulidae
  - Chevrotains or mouse-deer (10 species), native to primarily South and Southeast Asia; with the water chevrotain found in Central and West Africa
