= Vietnam mouse-deer =

Conservation status
- Data Deficient (IUCN 3.1)

Scientific classification
- Kingdom: Animalia
- Phylum: Chordata
- Class: Mammalia
- Order: Artiodactyla
- Family: Tragulidae
- Genus: Tragulus
- Species: T. versicolor

Binomial name
- Tragulus versicolor Thomas, 1910
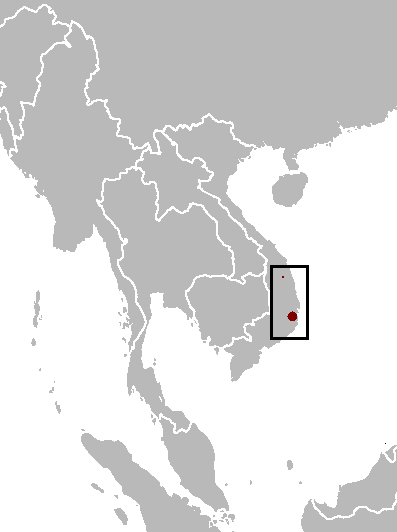
- Range of the Vietnam mouse deer (2008)

Species of deer

The Vietnam mouse-deer (Tragulus versicolor), also known as the silver-backed chevrotain, is an even-toed ungulate in the family Tragulidae known only from Vietnam. It was first described in 1910 by British zoologist Oldfield Thomas, who procured four specimens from Nha Trang in Annam. Little is known about its distribution and ecology. After 1910, the Vietnam mouse-deer was reported next in 1990 near Dak Rong and Buon Luoi in the Gia Lai Province. With increasing hunting pressure, habitat loss due to deforestation and no more reports of the species in the wild, the mouse-deer was feared to have gone extinct. The IUCN listed the species as Data Deficient in 2008. In 2019, a study confirmed the presence of the Vietnam mouse-deer in dry low-lying forests of southern Vietnam with camera trap evidence. The mouse-deer is characterised by a rough coat with a strange double-tone coloration unseen in other chevrotains; the front part of the body is reddish brown and contrasts strongly with the greyish posterior. It has big reddish brown ears, white and dark reddish brown marks on the throat.

== Taxonomy ==
The Vietnam mouse-deer was first described by British zoologist Oldfield Thomas in 1910 by the name Tragulus versicolor, who based his description of the species on four adult male specimens from Vietnam. Between 1910 and 2003 this mouse-deer was generally treated as a subspecies of the greater mouse-deer (T. napu), though it more closely resembles the lesser mouse-deer (T. kanchil). In a taxonomic revision in 2004, the Vietnam mouse-deer was identified as an independent species in Tragulus.

== Status and sightings ==
Information on the distribution and ecology of this mouse-deer is scarce; it is endemic to Vietnam and has been sighted only thrice in the wild. The four specimens obtained by Thomas were from Nha Trang (12°15′N 109°10′E) in Annam on the southern coast of Vietnam; this need not be the original location for the species, as the specimens could have been traded from elsewhere. The mouse-deer was not reported for another 80 years until a Vietnamese–Russian expedition in 1990 procured an adult male specimen from local hunters near Dak Rong and Buon Luoi in the Gia Lai Province. This specimen, initially assumed to be a Java mouse-deer (T. javanicus), was deposited in the Zoological Museum of Moscow University. A reexamination in 2004 identified the specimen as a Vietnam mouse-deer, noting its strange coloration compared to other chevrotains. Follow-up surveys indicated that heavy deforestation and hunting pressure had emerged as major threats to chevrotains in the area, but no significant measures were taken to assess the status of the Vietnam mouse-deer. With severe risks to its survival and no new specimens discovered, scientists feared the Vietnam mouse-deer might have gone extinct. The International Union for Conservation of Nature and Natural Resources (IUCN), in lack of survey data or ecological cues from which the status and population trend could be reliably assessed, listed the species as Data Deficient in 2008. The Vietnam mouse-deer was listed among the 25 "most wanted lost" species that are the focus of Global Wildlife Conservation's Search for Lost Species initiative.

Nearly 30 years after the last sighting, a study published in 2019 by researchers associated with the Global Wildlife Conservation confirmed the presence of Vietnam mouse-deer in dry low-lying forests on the southern coast of Vietnam. The researchers had begun with interviews of local people, some of whom suggested the presence of two types of chevrotain in the area; the descriptions indicated the two chevrotains could be the lesser mouse-deer and the Vietnam mouse-deer ('grey-coloured chevrotains'). All interviewees agreed that chevrotain populations had declined over the years in the region due to hunting. Camera traps were set up in areas from where grey chevrotains had been reported; the researchers were successful in capturing images of Vietnam mouse-deer, easily identifiable by their characteristic double-tone coloration and throat markings. The researchers said they aim to further study the size and stability of the populations.

== Physical description ==
In his 1910 account, Thomas described the Vietnam mouse-deer as having a rough coat, big reddish brown ears, and white and dark reddish brown marks on the throat. He noted the sharp contrast between the reddish brown colour of the front part of the body up to the shoulders, and the grey posterior separated by a line of buff from the white underparts—such stark variation is not observed in other chevrotains. The tail, grey in the upper part and white below, becomes more reddish brown toward the tip, which is white. Per his measurements, the head-and-body length is around 48 cm (19 in) and the tail is 5 cm (2 in) long. Examiners of the 1990 specimen noted its shabrack-like coat with dense fur on the back and white hair tips. A prominent silver line runs down the back, hence the name "silver-backed". The neck and shoulders are more brown with less dense fur; unlike the lesser mouse-deer the fur on the neck is coarser and less prickly. The Vietnam mouse-deer lacks the dark markings along the flanks and the middle portion of the underparts visible in the lesser mouse-deer.

== Ecology and habitat ==
The 2019 camera-trap evidence suggests that Vietnam mouse-deer are diurnal (active mainly during the day), and stay solitary or form pairs. The locality where the 1990 specimen was obtained was a low-lying area of semi-deciduous tropical forest; several lesser mouse-deer specimens were found in the same area, suggesting sympatry. The 2019 study observed the Vietnam mouse-deer in dry lowland forest near the southern coast of Vietnam.
