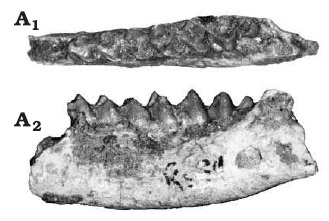
- A. moruorotensis mandible

Scientific classification
- Domain: Eukaryota
- Kingdom: Animalia
- Phylum: Chordata
- Class: Mammalia
- Order: Artiodactyla
- Family: Tragulidae
- Genus: †Afrotragulus; Sánchez et al., 2010

Species
- A. akhtari Sanchez et al. 2022; A. megalomilos Sanchez et al. 2022; A. moralesi Sanchez et al. 2022; A. moruorotensis Pickford et al., 2001 (type); A. parvus Withworth et al., 1958

Synonyms
- Dorcatherium moruorotensis Dorcatherium parvus

= Afrotragulus =

Afrotragulus Temporal range: Early Miocene

Extinct genus of mammals

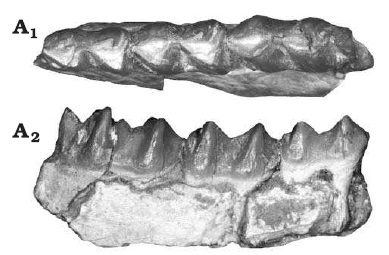
Mandible of A. moruorotensis

Afrotragulus is an extinct genus of tragulid ruminant which existed in Kenya and Pakistan during the early Miocene period. It contains the species Afrotragulus moruorotensis and Afrotragulus parvus, formerly classified in genus Dorcatherium, as well as A. akhtari, A. megalomilos, and A. moralesi.
