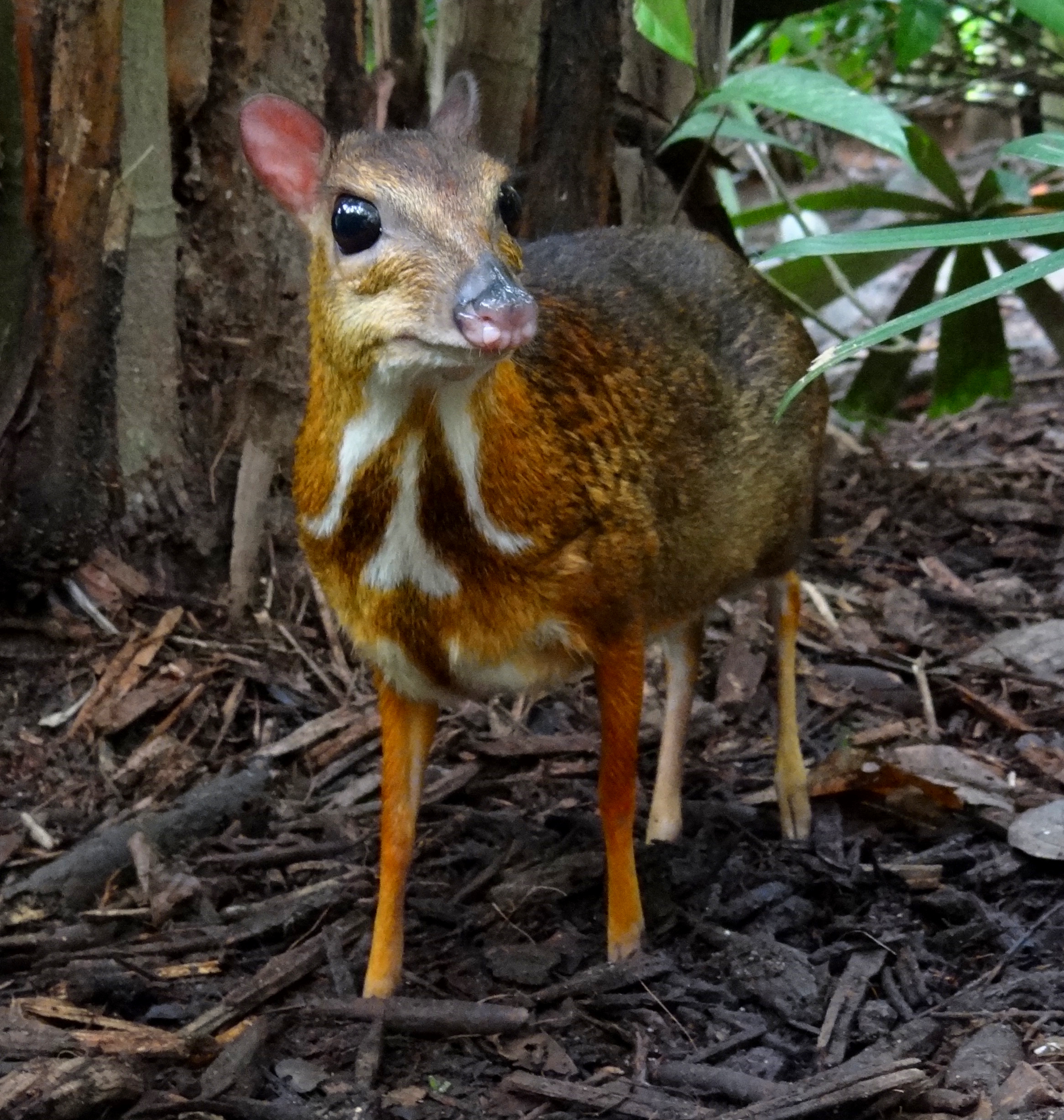
- Lesser mouse-deer (Tragulus kanchil)

Scientific classification
- Kingdom: Animalia
- Phylum: Chordata
- Class: Mammalia
- Order: Artiodactyla
- Suborder: Ruminantia
- Infraorder: Tragulina
- Family: Tragulidae; H. Milne-Edwards, 1864

Type genus
- Tragulus Brisson, 1762

Genera
- Hyemoschus; Moschiola; Tragulus
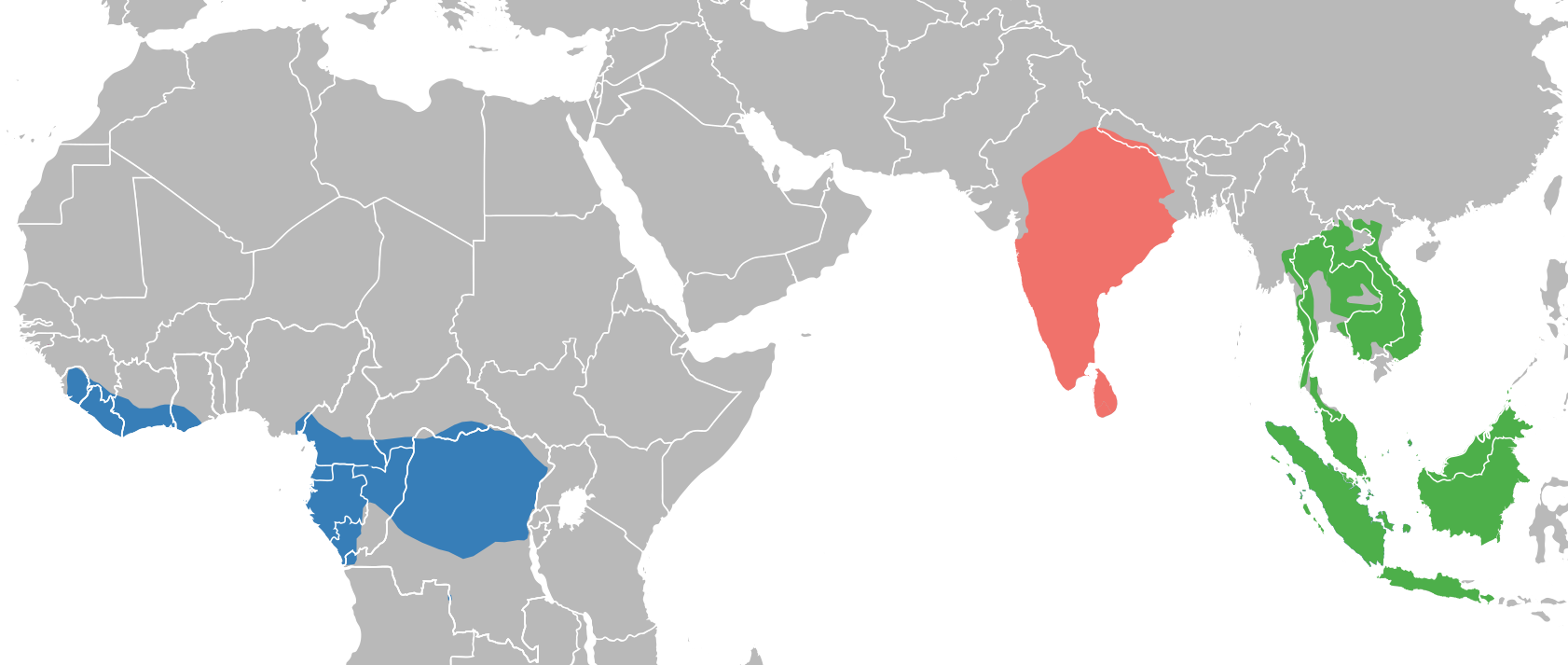
- Tragulidae distribution Hyemoschus in blue, Moschiola in red, and Tragulus in green

= Chevrotain =

Chevrotain Temporal range: Late Eocene – Present

Family of mammals belonging to even-toed ungulates

Chevrotains, or mouse-deer, are small, even-toed ungulates that make up the family Tragulidae, and are the only living members of the infraorder Tragulina. The 10 extant species are placed in three genera, but several species also are known only from fossils. The extant species are found in forests in South and Southeast Asia; a single species, the water chevrotain, is found in the rainforests of Central and West Africa. In November 2019, conservation scientists announced that they had photographed silver-backed chevrotains (Tragulus versicolor) in a Vietnamese forest for the first time since the last confirmed sightings in 1990.

They are solitary, or live in loose groupings or pairs, and feed almost exclusively on plant material. Chevrotains are the smallest hoofed mammals in the world. The Asian species weigh between 1–4 kg (2–9 lb), while the African chevrotain is considerably larger, at 7–16 kg (15–35 lb). With an average length of 45 cm (18 in) and an average height of 30 cm (12 in), the Java mouse-deer is the smallest surviving ungulate (hoofed) mammal, as well as the smallest artiodactyl (even-toed ungulate). Despite their common name of "mouse-deer", they are not closely related to true deer, hence the orthographic distinction by means of the hyphen.

== Etymology ==
The word "chevrotain" comes from the Middle French word chevrot (kid or fawn), derived from chèvre (goat).

The single African species is consistently known as "chevrotain". The names "chevrotain" and "mouse-deer" have been used interchangeably among the Asian species, though recent authorities typically have preferred chevrotain for the species in the genus Moschiola and mouse-deer for the species in the genus Tragulus. Consequently, all species with pale-spotted or -striped upper parts are known as "chevrotain" and without are known as "mouse-deer".

The Telugu name for the Indian spotted chevrotain is jarini pandi, which literally means "a deer and a pig". The Tamil term is சருகு மான் sarukumāṉ "leaf-pile deer". The Sinhala name meeminna roughly translates to "mouse-like deer". This was used in the scientific name of the Sri Lankan spotted chevrotain, M. meminna.

== Biology ==
The family was widespread and successful from the Oligocene (34 million years ago) through the Miocene (about 5 million years ago). Their basic morphology has changed little, though some species in the genus Dorcatherium were several times larger than any extant species. They have four-chambered stomachs to ferment tough plant foods, but the third chamber is poorly developed. Unlike other artiodactyls, they lack a carotid rete, and so cannot heat exchange cool blood entering their brains, a thermoregulatory innovation that allows other artiodactyls to exploit hot arid habitats. Though most species feed exclusively on plant material, the water chevrotain occasionally takes insects and crabs or scavenges meat and fish. Like other ruminants, they lack upper incisors. They give birth to only a single young.

In other respects, however, they have primitive features, closer to nonruminants such as pigs. All species in the family lack antlers and horns, but both sexes have elongated canine teeth. These are especially prominent in males, where they project out on either side of the lower jaw, and are used in fights. Their legs are short and thin, which leave them lacking in agility, but also helps to maintain a smaller profile to aid in running through the dense foliage of their environments. Other pig-like features include the presence of four toes on each foot, the absence of facial scent glands, premolars with sharp crowns, and the form of their sexual behaviour and copulation.

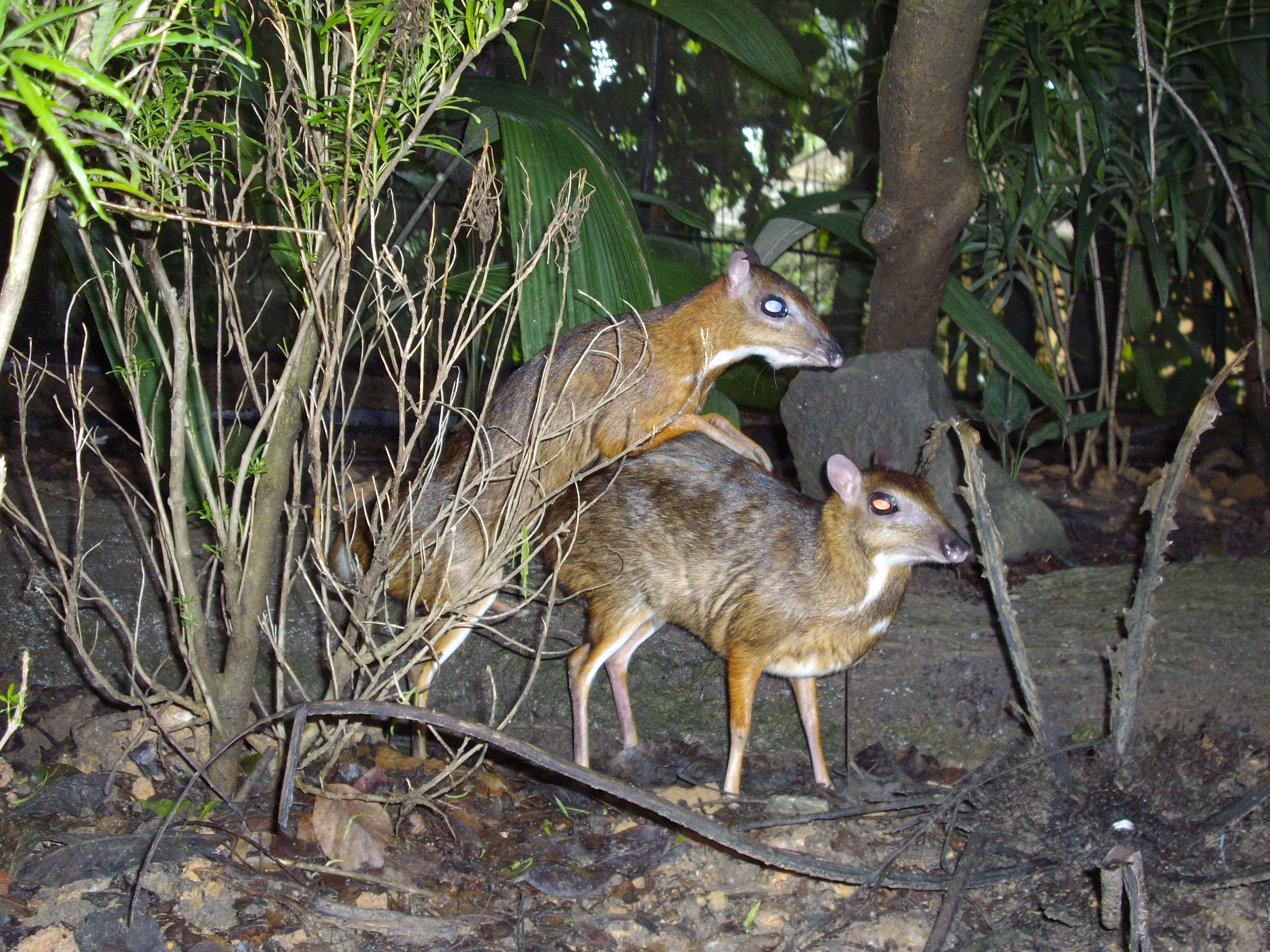
Mating mouse-deer

They are solitary or live in pairs. The young are weaned at three months of age, and reach sexual maturity between 5 and 10 months, depending on species. Parental care is relatively limited. Although they lack the types of scent glands found in most other ruminants, they do possess a chin gland for marking each other as mates or antagonists, and, in the case of the water chevrotain, anal and preputial glands for marking territory. Their territories are relatively small, on the order of 13–24 hectares (32–59 acres), but neighbors generally ignore each other, rather than compete aggressively.

Some of the species show a remarkable affinity with water, often remaining submerged for prolonged periods to evade predators or other unwelcome intrusions. This has also lent support to the idea that whales evolved from water-loving creatures that looked like small deer.

== Taxonomy ==
Tragulidae's placement within Artiodactyla can be represented in the following cladogram:

- Artiodactyla
  - Tylopoda (camels)
  - Artiofabula
    - Suina (pigs)
    - Cetruminantia
      - Ruminantia (ruminants)
        - Tragulidae (mouse-deer)
        - Pecora (horn bearers)
      - Cetancodonta/Whippomorpha
        - Hippopotamidae (hippopotamuses)
        - Cetacea (whales)

Traditionally, only four extant species were recognized in the family Tragulidae. In 2004, T. nigricans and T. versicolor were split from T. napu, and T. kanchil and T. williamsoni were split from T. javanicus. In 2005, M. indica and M. kathygre were split from M. meminna. With these changes, the 10 extant species are:

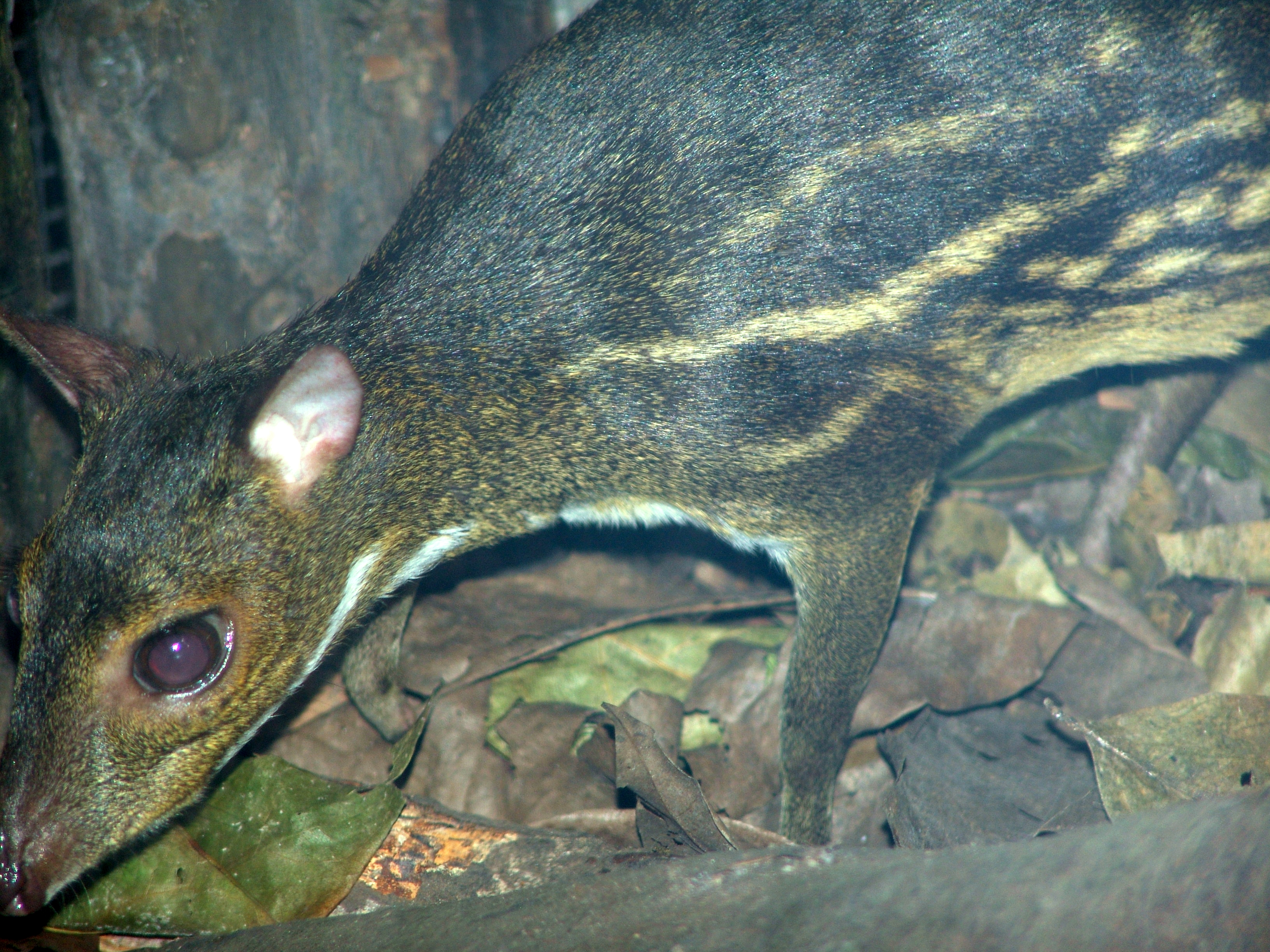
Indian spotted chevrotain

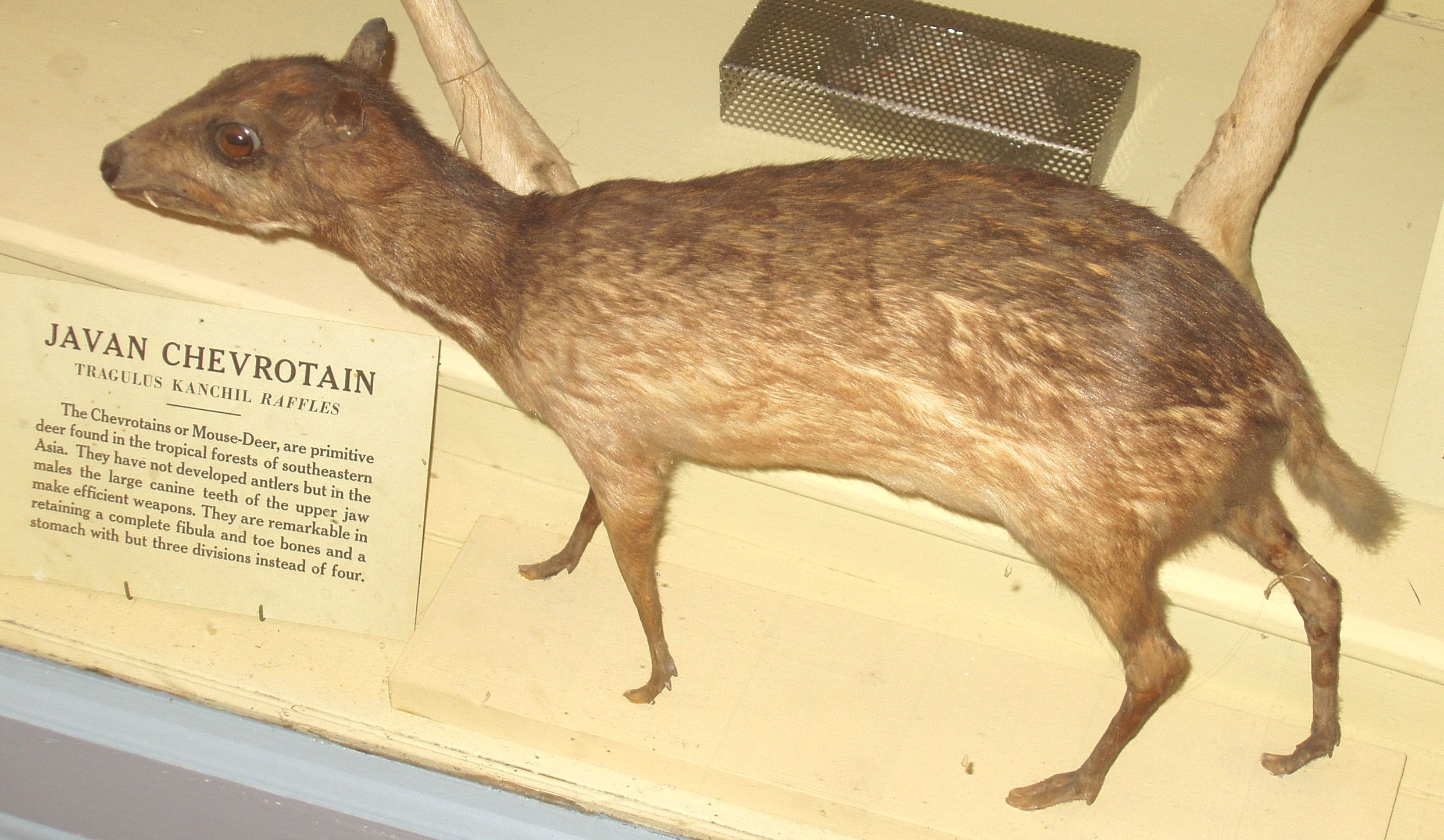
Tragulus sp. (Note: Changing taxonomy in the genus Tragulus make exact species identification uncertain, but either T. javanicus or T. kanchil. Note also the contradicting English and scientific names on the sign on the photo.)

- Family Tragulidae
  - Genus Hyemoschus
    - Water chevrotain, Hyemoschus aquaticus
  - Genus Moschiola
    - Indian spotted chevrotain, Moschiola indica
    - Sri Lankan spotted chevrotain, Moschiola meminna
    - Yellow-striped chevrotain, Moschiola kathygre
  - Genus Tragulus
    - Java mouse-deer, Tragulus javanicus
    - Lesser mouse-deer or kanchil, Tragulus kanchil
    - Greater mouse-deer, Tragulus napu
    - Philippine mouse-deer, Tragulus nigricans
    - Vietnam mouse-deer, Tragulus versicolor
    - Williamson's mouse-deer, Tragulus williamsoni

== Extinct chevrotains ==
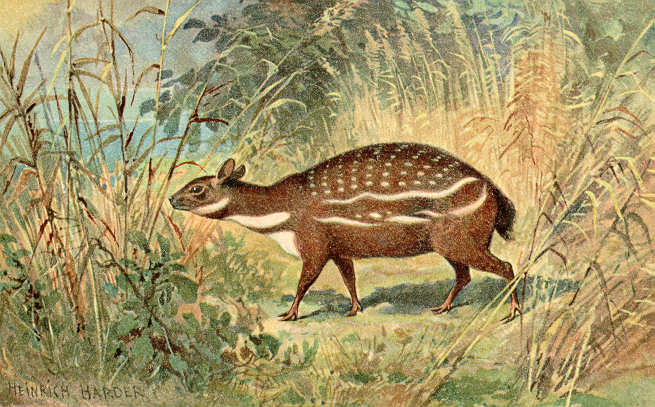
Reconstruction of Dorcatherium by Heinrich Harder.

The Hypertragulidae were closely related to the Tragulidae.

The six extinct chevrotain genera include:

- Genus Dorcatherium
  - Dorcatherium minus from Pakistan
  - Dorcatherium majus from Pakistan
  - Dorcatherium naui, from Central Europe
- Genus Dorcabune
  - Dorcabune anthracotherioides from Pakistan
  - Dorcabune nagrii from Pakistan
- Genus Afrotragulus Sánchez, Quiralte, Morales and Pickford, 2010
  - Afrotragulus moruorotensis (previously "Dorcatherium" moruorotensis Pickford, 2001) (early Miocene) from Moruorot, Kenya
  - Afrotragulus parvus (previously "D." parvus Withworth 1958) (early Miocene) from Rusinga Island, Kenya
- Genus Siamotragulus
  - Siamotragulus sanyathanai Thomas, Ginsburg, Hintong and Suteethorn, 1990 (middle Miocene) from Lampang, Thailand
  - Siamotragulus haripounchai Mein and Ginsburg, 1997 (Miocene) from Lamphun, Thailand
- Genus Yunnanotherium
- Genus Archaeotragulus
  - Archaeotragulus krabiensis Metais, Chaimanee, Jaeger and Ducrocq, 2001 (late Eocene) from Krabi, Thailand

The extinct chevrotains might also include

- Genus Krabitherium
  - Krabitherium waileki Metais, Chaimanee, Jaeger and Ducrocq, 2007 (late Eocene) from Krabi, Thailand
- Genus Nalameryx
  - Nalameryx savagei
  - Nalameryx sulaimani

== Mythology ==
The supporters of the coat of arms of Malacca are two mouse-deer, alluding to the founding legend of Malacca.

According to the Malay Annals, King Parameswara, seeking a place to found a new city, came to a place where he saw a mouse-deer (kancil in Malay) kicking his hunting dog into the river. He thought this boded well, remarking, "This place is excellent. Even the mouse deer is formidable. It is best that we establish a kingdom here". This became the Malacca Sultanate and Malacca its capital. In memory of this founding legend, the coat of arms of Malacca depicts two mouse-deer.

The mouse-deer or Sang Kancil is also a well-known trickster of Malay folklore.
