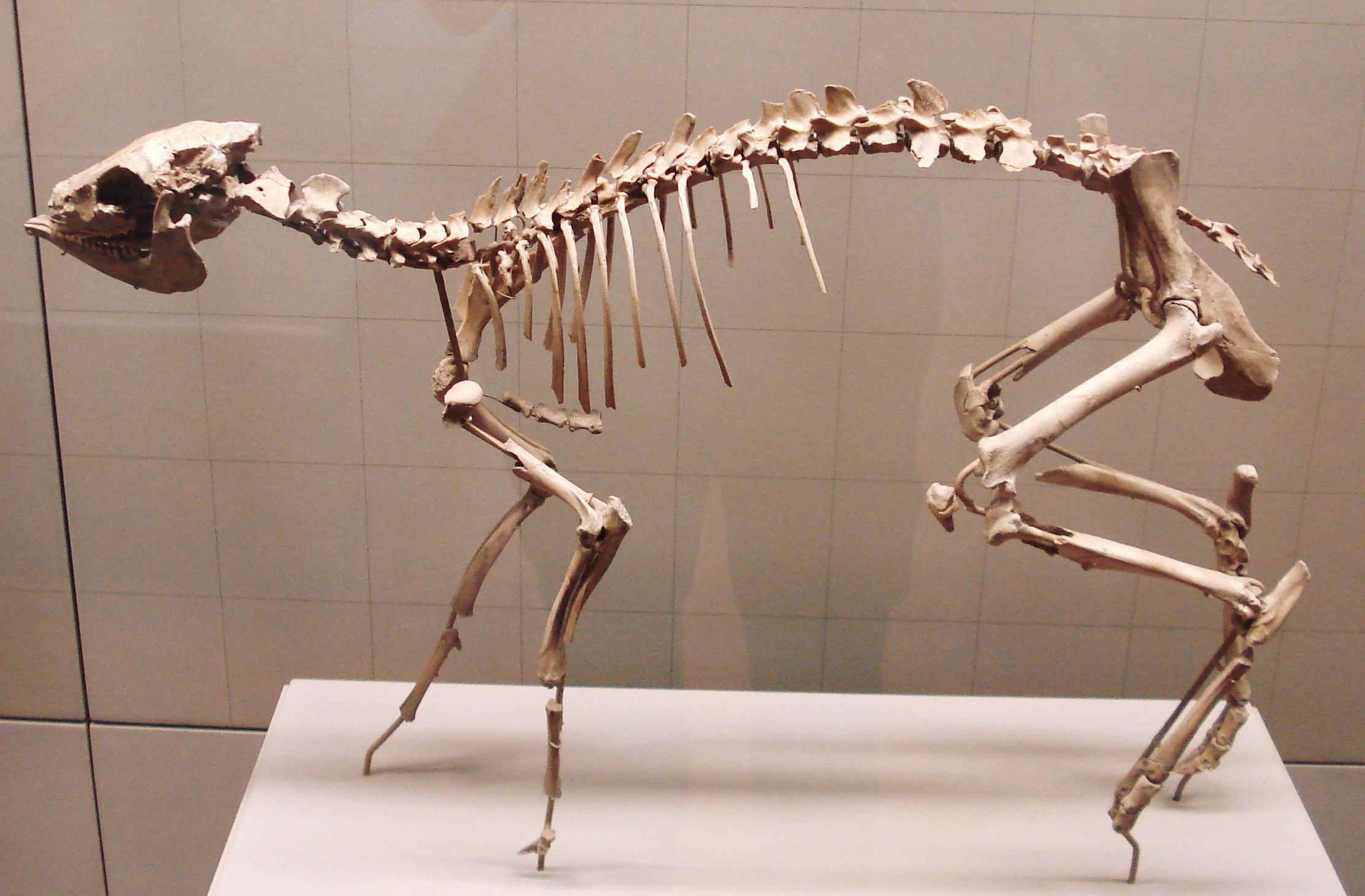
- Dorcatherium naui skeleton, Staatliches Museum für Naturkunde Stuttgart

Scientific classification
- Kingdom: Animalia
- Phylum: Chordata
- Class: Mammalia
- Order: Artiodactyla
- Family: Tragulidae
- Genus: †Dorcatherium; Johann Jakob Kaup, 1833

Type species
- †Dorcatherium naui Kaup & Scholl, 1834

Other species
- †Dorcatherium guntianum von Meyer, 1846; †Dorcatherium majus Lydekker, 1876; †Dorcatherium jourdani Déperet, 1887; †Dorcatherium puyhauberti Arambourg & Piveteau, 1929; †Dorcatherium pigotti Whitworth, 1958; †Dorcatherium bulgaricum? Bakalov & Nikolov, 1962; †Dorcatherium nagrii Prasad, 1970; †Dorcatherium libiensis Hamilton, 1973; †Dorcatherium minimus West, 1980; †Dorcatherium orientale Qiu Zhanxiang & Gu Yumin, 1991; †Dorcatherium maliki Kostopoulos & Sen, 2016; †Dorcatherium dehmi Guzmán, Sandoval & Rössner, 2021

= Dorcatherium =

Dorcatherium Temporal range: Miocene, Possibly Pliocene 23–5.3 Ma

Extinct genus of mammals

Dorcatherium is an extinct genus of tragulid ruminant which existed in Europe, East Africa, and the Siwaliks during the Miocene and possibly Pliocene.

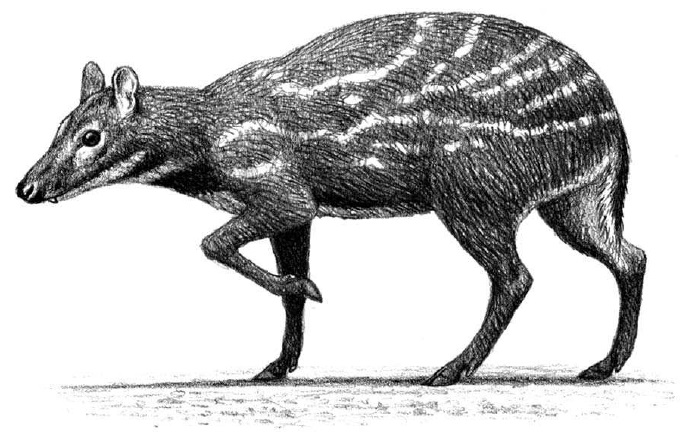
Dorcatherium sp. by Mauricio Anton

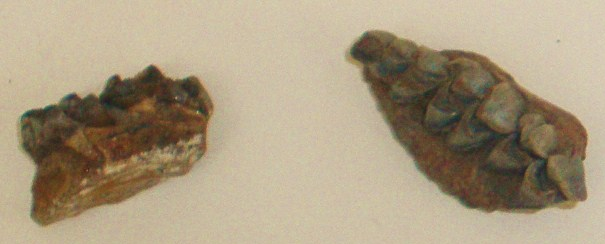
Dorcatherium minus jaw fragments, Natural History Museum, London

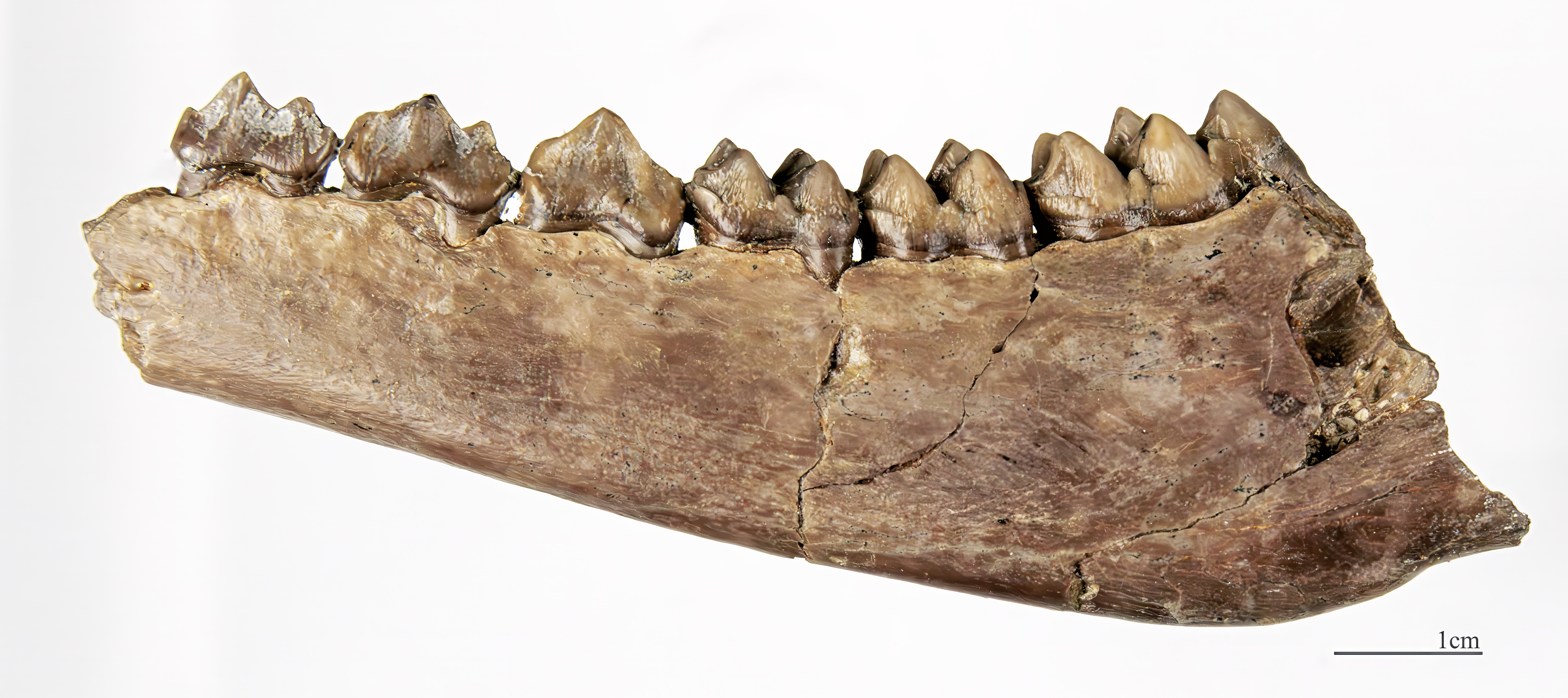
Dorcatherium crassum Left Hemi Mandible MHNT

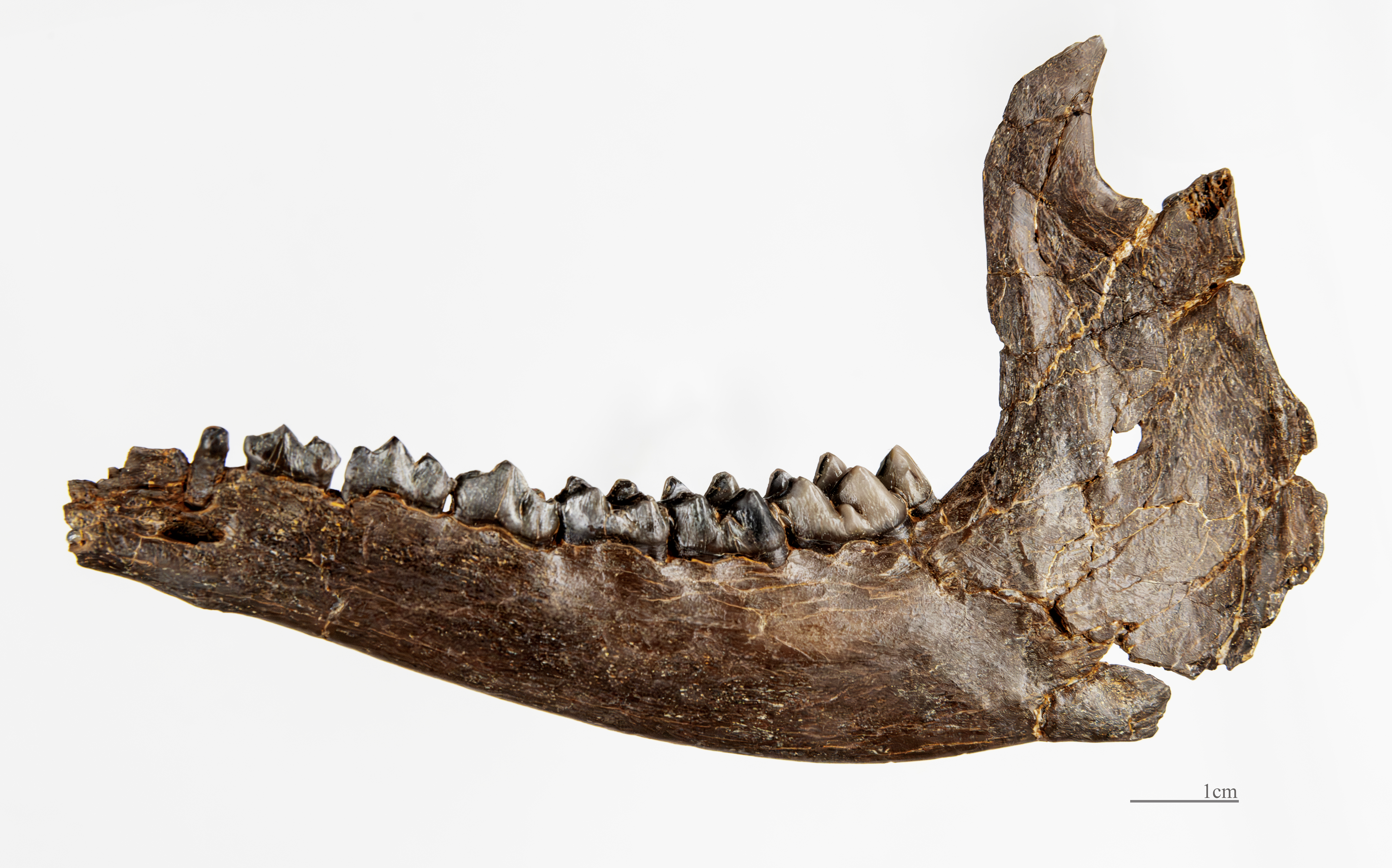
Dorcatherium guntianum Left Hemi Mandible MHNT

== Description ==
Dorcatherium is similar to the water chevrotain, but has longer, more gracile limbs than the latter. D. naui was sexually dimorphic, with one sex (probably males) having a frontoparietal bulge above the eyes.

== Palaeoecology ==
D. naui was partially frugivorous, the evidence for this being its dental enamel's ^{87}Sr/^{86}Sr, δ^{18}O_{CO3}, and δ^{13}C values. The dental microwear and mesowear of D. naui provides further evidence that it was a frugivorous browser. At the Middle Miocene site of Maboko in Kenya, D. pigotti displays relatively high δ^{13}C values, probably indicative of feeding in less wooded environments than modern tragulids, while the δ^{13}C values of D. chappuisi at the same site were even higher, suggesting a preference for even more open and arid habitats than D. pigotti.
