= Sang Kancil =

Character of traditional fables popular in Indonesia and Malaysia

- First appearance: c. 15th century
- Voiced by: Zainab Wahab (Hikayat Sang Kancil (1983)); Nini Razli (2024 film)

In-universe information
- Aliases: Si Kancil; Pelanduk Jenaka (Mischievous Mouse-deer)
- Species: Lesser mouse-deer
- Gender: Male
- Occupation: Trickster

The story of Sang Kancil (also known as Si Kancil) is a series of traditional fables about a clever mouse-deer. They are popular in Indonesia and Malaysia. A weak and small yet cunning figure, Sang Kancil uses his intelligence to triumph over beings more powerful than himself. The protagonist of these stories is Sang Kancil, a smart and sly mouse deer. He can fool the other animals to escape from trouble. This folk figure is similar to another folk figure, Br'er Rabbit.

== Appearances ==
Sang Kancil has appeared in several proses which involve him tricking other animals and gaining advantage against them with his smarts.

=== Sang Kancil and the Farmer ===
In this story, Sang Kancil tried to steal cucumbers from a farmer's field. The first time, he stole some cucumbers successfully. He then encountered a scarecrow, and mocked it because it could not scare him. He kicked the scarecrow with his front leg, but it got stuck in the scarecrow, which the farmer had filled with glue. Sang Kancil tried to pull out his leg, but in vain, as the glue was too strong for him. Later, the farmer came and laughed at Sang Kancil, who was trapped by the glue on the scarecrow. He then put him inside a cage for the rest of the day. Later that night, the farmer's dog came to see Sang Kancil. The dog mocked him and said he would be cooked the following morning, but Sang Kancil stayed calm and relaxed. The dog got confused and asked him why he was calm. Sang Kancil told him that he is going to be a prince, then marry the farmer's daughter, taking pity on them. The dog, who felt discriminated against by his own master, asked him to switch places. He thought that by switching places with Sang Kancil, he would become a prince instead. So, the dog opened the cage and let Sang Kancil free. The following day, the farmer was confused because he did not see Sang Kancil anywhere; instead, he saw his dog in the cage, wagging his tail.

=== Sang Kancil and the Elephant ===
Sang Kancil was trapped inside a hole made by some hunters. He screamed for help, but no one heard him. He thought it was hopeless for him to escape from the trap. He waited for a while until an elephant came. Then, he had an idea. He lied to them that sky is falling, to which the elephant foolishly followed Sang Kancil's order and jumped down into the hole. Sang Kancil fails to jump on the elephant's body. A tiger fell into the hole and was getting ready to feast on the elephant and Sang Kancil, then a thunderstorm came and frightened the tiger. Sang Kancil quickly climbed the elephant and got out of the hole. Sang Kancil quickly ran and left the elephant alone with the fierce tiger.

=== Sang Kancil and the Crocodiles ===
One day, Sang Kancil wanted to cross a river, but the river was infested with hungry crocodiles who might eat him. Eventually, the Sang Kancil had an idea, telling the crocodiles they cannot eat him unless they form a row for him to cross, promising to let them do so if they brought him to the island.

Believing what he said, the crocodiles followed his order and formed a row between the two sides of the river. He then quickly hopped from one crocodile to another until he reached the other side of the river, leaving the reptiles angry and far behind.

After that day, the crocodiles didn’t believe anything that Sang Kancil told them. But one day, Sang Kancil fooled them by telling the crocodiles that the king would throw a party and all the animals were invited. He said that he wanted to count the number of family members they have. The crocodiles lined up while Sang Kancil hopped onto their backs, counting, getting to the other side easily.

The persistence of Sang Kancil shows that even the smallest and seemingly weakest individual can overcome obstacles by using their intelligence and cunning. Sang Kancil's quick thinking and ability to manipulate the crocodiles' desires allowed him to escape danger and achieve his goal. The story also serves as a reminder that one should not underestimate the power of a sharp mind.

=== Sang Kancil and the Tiger ===
Sang Kancil was drinking at the river when a tiger who wanted to eat him suddenly arrived. Sang Kancil tried to escape, but the tiger was faster than he was. Cornered by the tiger, he thought of how to escape. He told the tiger his king is stronger than him. Feeling taunted, the tiger declared he would challenge this “king”. He led the tiger to the river and told him to look into it. The tiger looked into the river and thought he saw another tiger in the water. He growled, but the "king", his reflection, growled too. The tiger jumped into the water, believing there was another tiger there as Sang Kancil took the opportunity to escape. After fighting with the "king" in the river, the tiger realized it was only his reflection. Fooled by Sang Kancil, the tiger wanted revenge and continues to hunt him down to this day.
