= Williamson's mouse-deer =

Williamson's chevrotain

Conservation status
- Data Deficient (IUCN 3.1)

Scientific classification
- Kingdom: Animalia
- Phylum: Chordata
- Class: Mammalia
- Order: Artiodactyla
- Family: Tragulidae
- Genus: Tragulus
- Species: T. williamsoni

Binomial name
- Tragulus williamsoni Kloss, 1916
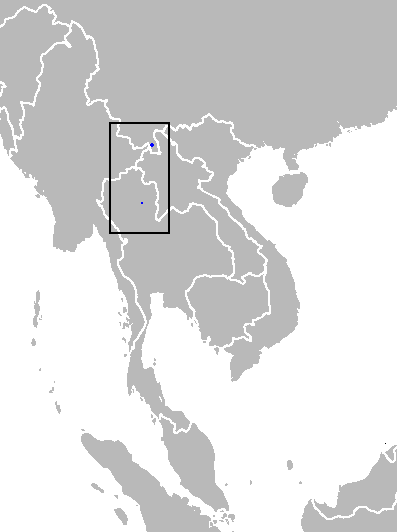

Species of mammal

Williamson's mouse-deer (Tragulus williamsoni), also called the northern mouse-deer and Williamson's chevrotain, is a species of even-toed ungulate in the family Tragulidae. It is found in Thailand and southern China. The species is named after the collector Walter James Franklin Williamson.

== Morphology ==
Williamson's mouse-deer is a tawny colored ungulate with a darker head and a white underbelly. It has a white triangular patch on the throat with a tawny border.

Williamson's mouse-deer measures around 0.47 m (1 ft 7 in) long and weighs around 3.5 kg (7.7 lb) making it significantly larger than most other mouse-deer.

== Habitat and ecology ==
Williamson's mouse-deer is found in Thailand and in the Yunnan province of southern China. It favors low-altitude habitats with dense foliage along the banks of rivers or streams. Williamson's mouse-deer demonstrates a preference for areas populated by fig trees, Burmese grapes, Alpinia kwangsiensis, and Phrynium capitatum.

Williamson's mouse-deer is crepuscular. This may enable it to avoid competition with larger herbivores such as boars, muntjacs, sambars, and serows, all of which are more active nocturnally than the mouse-deer.

== Description and taxonomy ==
Williamson's mouse-deer was described by the English zoologist C. Boden Kloss in 1916 as a subspecies of the lesser mouse-deer (Tragulus kanchil). The holotype specimen was collected by Walter James Franklin Williamson from the Me Song Forest in northern Thailand. It is held at Natural History Museum in London.

== Conservation status ==
The IUCN Red List lists Williamson's mouse-deer as data deficient. Based on its known range, it is presumed to be threatened by local hunting practices and by habitat loss due to logging, farming, rubber plantations, and urbanization.

Williamson's mouse-deer is listed as a first-class protected species in China.
