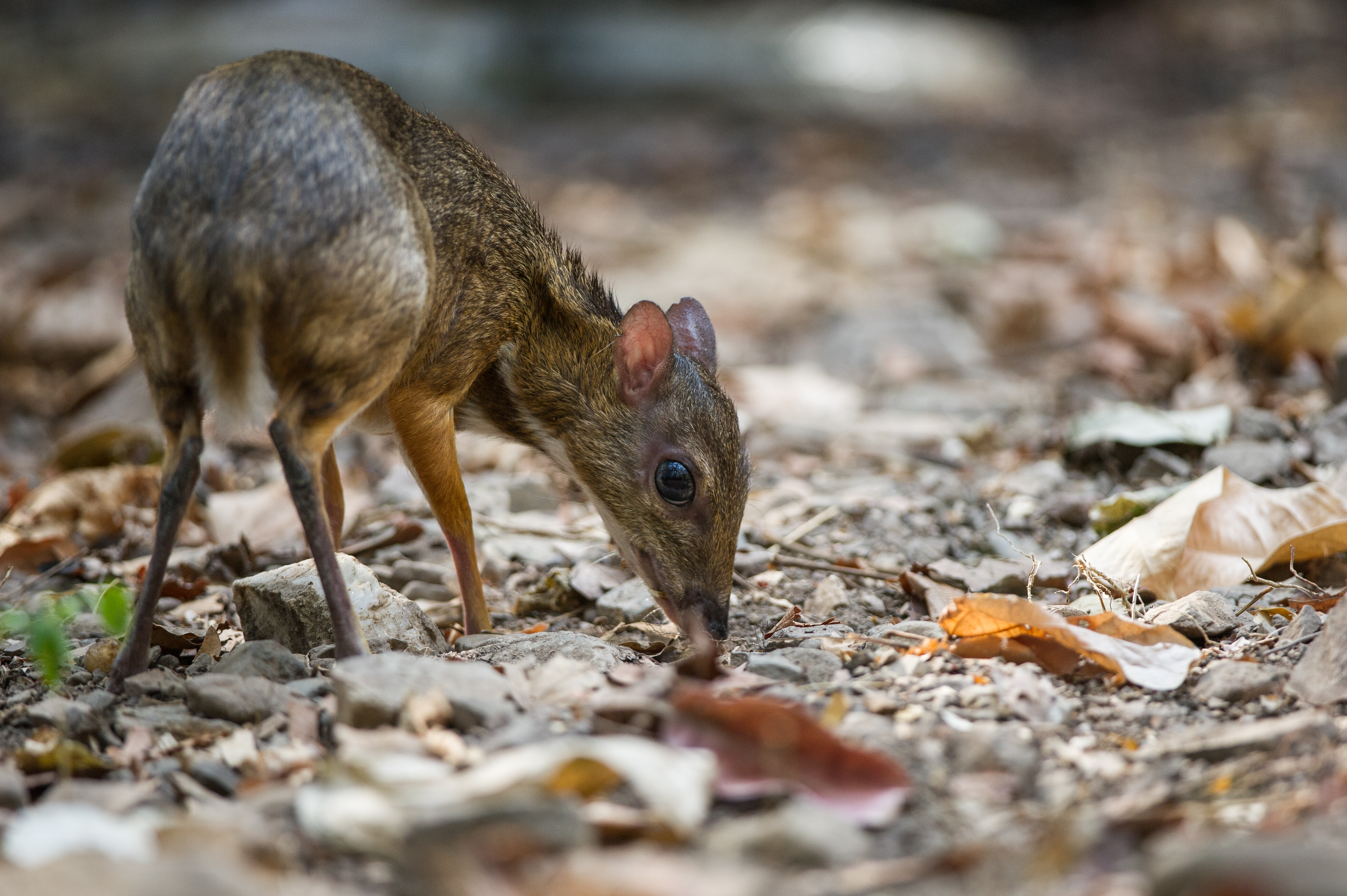

Scientific classification
- Kingdom: Animalia
- Phylum: Chordata
- Class: Mammalia
- Order: Artiodactyla
- Family: Tragulidae
- Genus: Tragulus; Brisson, 1762

Type species
- Cervus javanicus Osbeck, 1765
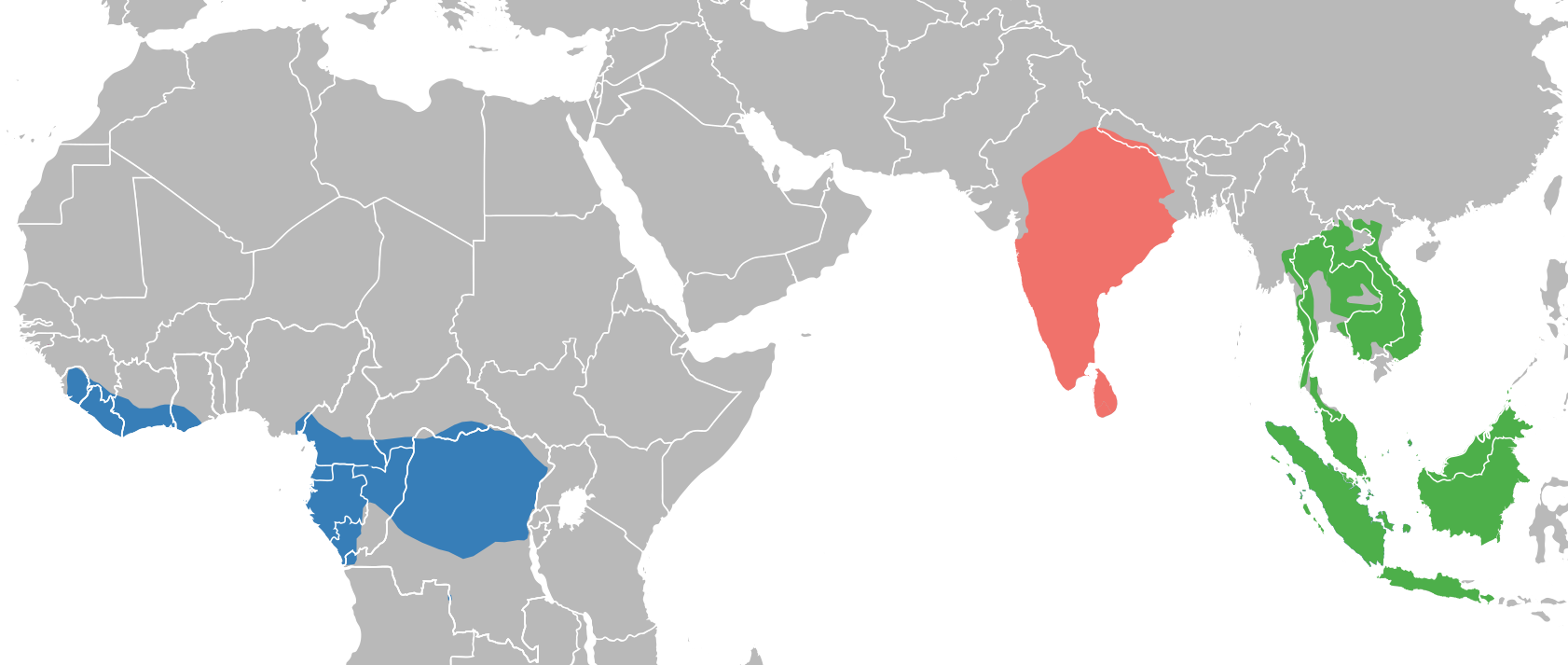
- Tragulidae distribution Tragulus in green

= Tragulus =

Genus of mammals

Tragulus is a genus of even-toed ungulates in the family Tragulidae that are known as mouse-deer. In Ancient Greek τράγος (tragos) means a male goat, while the Latin diminutive –ulus means 'tiny'. With a weight of 0.7–8.0 kg (1.5–17.6 lb) and a length of 40–75 cm (16–30 in), they are the smallest ungulates in the world, though the largest species of mouse-deer surpass some species of Neotragus antelopes in size. The mouse-deer are restricted to Southeast Asia from far Southern China (south Yunnan) to the Philippines (Balabac) and Java.

Following recent taxonomic changes, several of the species in this genus are poorly known, but all are believed to be mainly nocturnal and feed on leaves, fruits, grasses, and other vegetation in the dense forest undergrowth. They are solitary or live in pairs, and the males have elongated canine teeth (neither gender has horns or antlers) that are used in fights. Unlike other members of their family, the Tragulus mouse-deer lack obvious pale stripes/spots on their upper parts.

== Taxonomy ==
Traditionally, only two species of mouse-deer in the genus Tragulus have been recognized: The relatively large T. napu and the small T. javanicus. Following a review in 2004, T. nigricans and T. versicolor were split from T. napu, and T. kanchil and T. williamsoni were split from T. javanicus. With these changes, T. kanchil and T. napu are the most widespread species, while the remaining have far smaller distributions (though some uncertainty over the exact distribution limits of the various species in Indochina remain).

- Java mouse-deer (Tragulus javanicus)
- Lesser mouse-deer (Tragulus kanchil)
- Greater mouse-deer (Tragulus napu)
- Philippine mouse-deer (Tragulus nigricans)
- Vietnam mouse-deer (Tragulus versicolor)
- Williamson's mouse-deer (Tragulus williamsoni)
