= Siamotragulus =

Siamotragulus Temporal range: Miocene

Scientific classification
- Kingdom: Animalia
- Phylum: Chordata
- Class: Mammalia
- Infraclass: Placentalia
- Order: Artiodactyla
- Family: Tragulidae
- Genus: †Siamotragulus; Thomas et al., 1990

Extinct genus of tragulid

Siamotragulus is an extinct genus of tragulid that inhabited Afro-Eurasia during the Miocene epoch.

== Palaeoecology ==
S. sanyathanai and S. songhorensis possessed thin and lengthy metapodials that bore fused central metatarsi and metacarpi, implying that they were well adapted for cursoriality.
