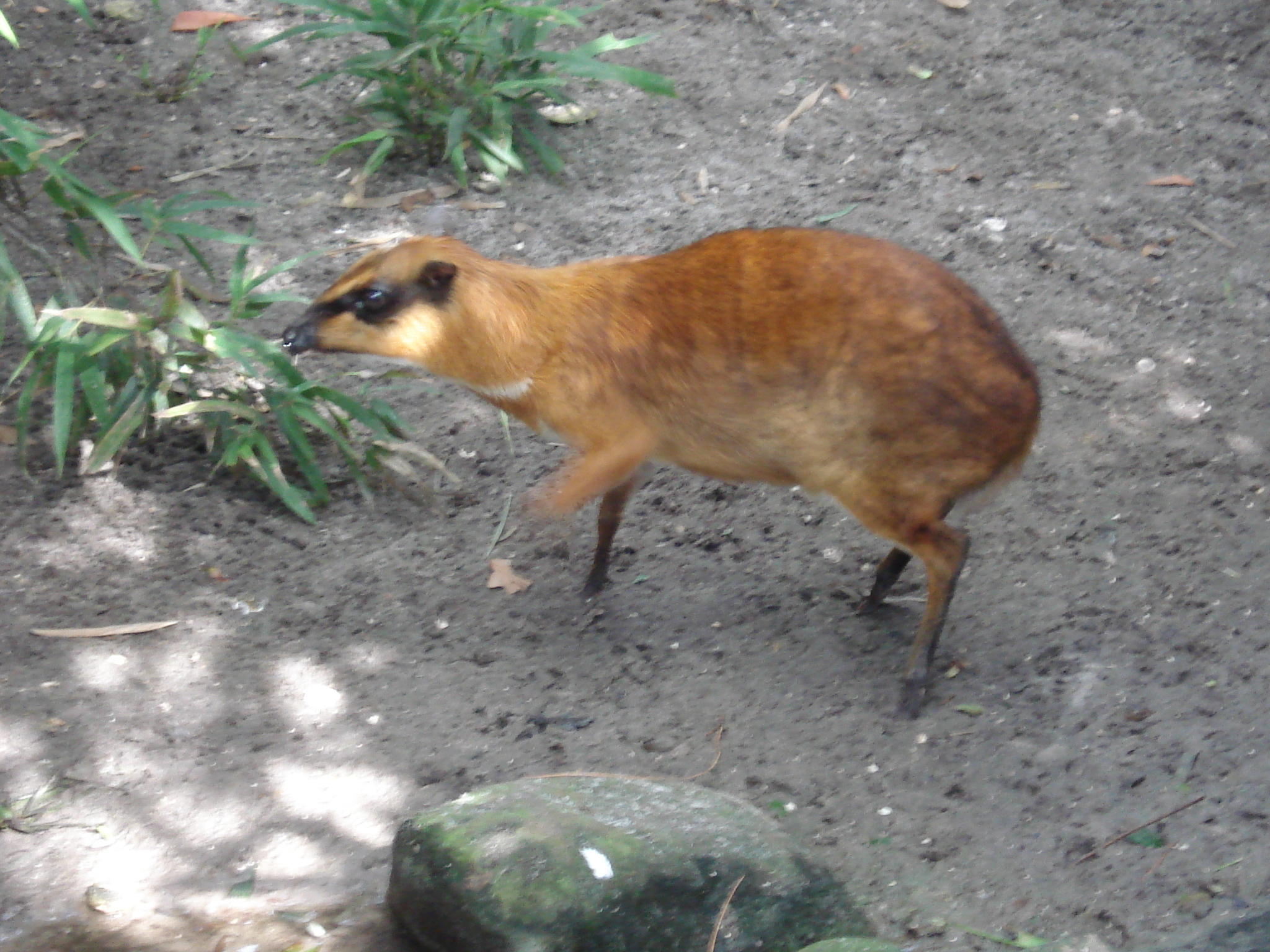
- At Palm Beach Zoo, Florida

Conservation status
- Least Concern (IUCN 3.1)

Scientific classification
- Kingdom: Animalia
- Phylum: Chordata
- Class: Mammalia
- Order: Artiodactyla
- Family: Tragulidae
- Genus: Tragulus
- Species: T. napu

Binomial name
- Tragulus napu (F. Cuvier, 1822)
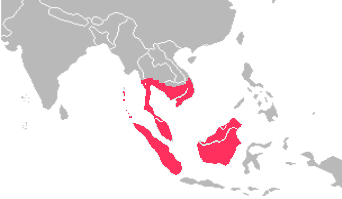

= Greater mouse-deer =

Species of mammal

The greater mouse-deer, greater Malay chevrotain, or napu (Tragulus napu) is a species of even-toed ungulate in the family Tragulidae found in Sumatra, Borneo, and smaller Malaysian and Indonesian islands, and in southern Myanmar, southern Thailand, and peninsular Malaysia. Its natural habitat is subtropical or tropical, moist, lowland forest.

== Etymology ==
Tragos is Greek for "goat" and -ulus in Latin means "tiny". Napu is a local name, from Malay napuh. The name "mouse-deer" refers to its small size and does not imply that it is a true deer. It is called "greater" because it is larger than other Tragulus species.

== Morphology ==
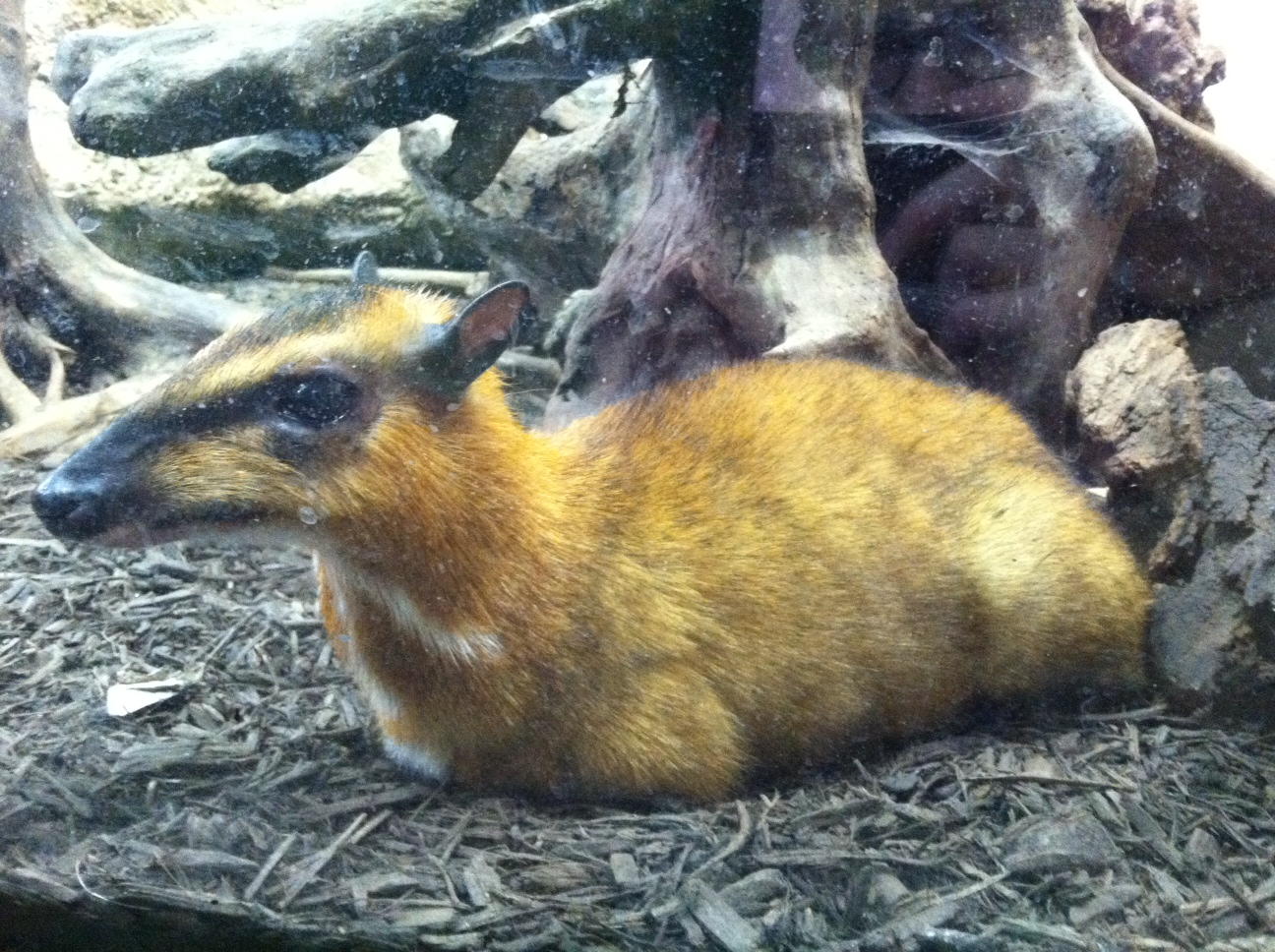
Greater mouse-deer at the Smithsonian National Zoological Park, Washington, DC

The greater mouse-deer is an even-toed ungulate. Although very small for an ungulate, the greater mouse-deer is one of the largest members of its genus. It is rivalled in size by Williamson's mouse-deer. It weighs 5 to 8 kg (11 to 18 lb). Its head-and-body length is 70 to 75 cm (2.30 to 2.46 ft) and its tail length is 8 to 10 cm (3.1 to 3.9 in). Its shoulder height is about 30 to 35 cm (12 to 14 in) It has a small, triangular head with a small, pointed, black nose and large eyes. Its long legs are as thin as a pencil. The hind legs are visibly longer than the front legs. The body is rounded. The fur on the upper part of its body is grey-buff to orange-buff. On the sides, the fur is quite pale, but darker along the midline. It is white underneath, more specifically on the neck, stomach, chest, and chin. The male has neither horns nor antlers, but has small "tusks" – elongated canines in the upper jaws.

== Distribution ==
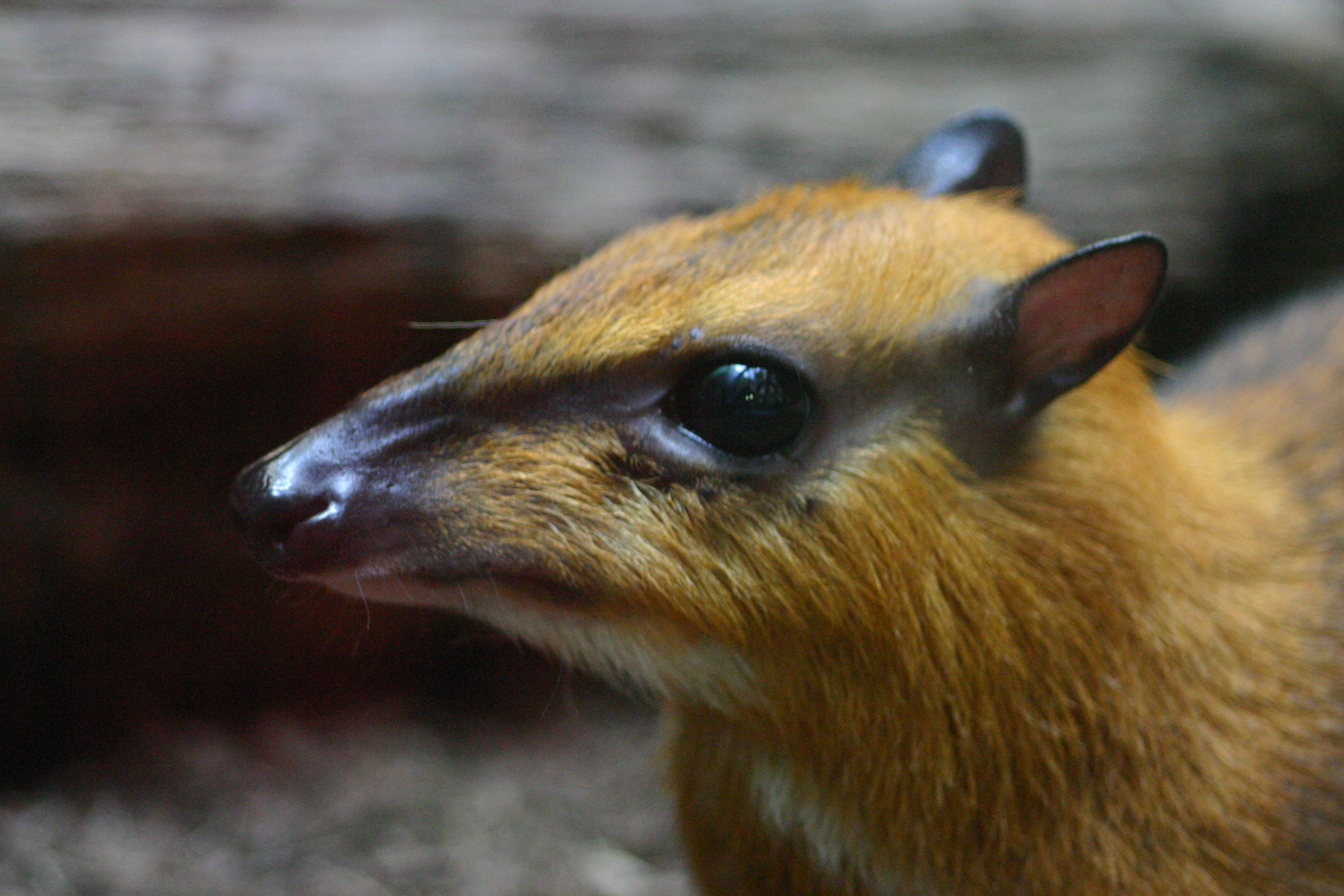
Head of greater mouse-deer

Greater mouse-deer are found in Sumatra, Borneo, and smaller Malaysian and Indonesian islands, and in southern Myanmar, southern Thailand, and peninsular Malaysia. They live near water, in tropical forests and mangrove thickets. Thought to be regionally extinct in Singapore, they were rediscovered on an offshore island in 2008. Reports of its occurrence elsewhere are probably incorrect. They are terrestrial, but spend time in wet, swampy areas.

== Behaviour ==
The greater mouse-deer is solitary and nocturnal. It uses small trails through thick brush in the forest. When the male is ready to mate, he rubs a large gland on his lower jaw against the female to determine whether she is ready to mate. If she is not ready, she responds by walking away. The male is very territorial, marking his territory with feces, urine, and secretions from the intermandibular gland under the chin. When angry, the male beats the ground with his hooves at a rate of four times per second.

They are rather trusting but delicate animals. They feed on fallen fruits, aquatic plants, buds, leaves, shrubs and grasses.

== Reproduction ==
Greater mouse-deer breed throughout the year; the female spends most of her adult life pregnant. They usually produce one young per birth, after a gestation of 152–155 days. Newborn animals are well-developed and immediately able to stand; they are fully active after 30 minutes. The young stand on three legs while nursing. Both male and female become mature at age 4 1/2 months. Their lifespan is up to 14 years.

== Ecology and conservation ==
The major threats to T. napu are overhunting by humans and loss of habitat through rapid deforestation.

A study on Pulau Ubin, Singapore found that the greater mouse-deer population density spiked to 293 individuals per square kilometre, the highest ever recorded for the species. This population boom followed a 2023 African swine fever (ASF) outbreak that eliminated over 98% of the island's wild boar population, leading to an "ecological release" from competition and possible predation pressures. While the population was already growing due to forest restoration, the ASF event dramatically accelerated this trend, causing an over four-fold density increase in just five years.
