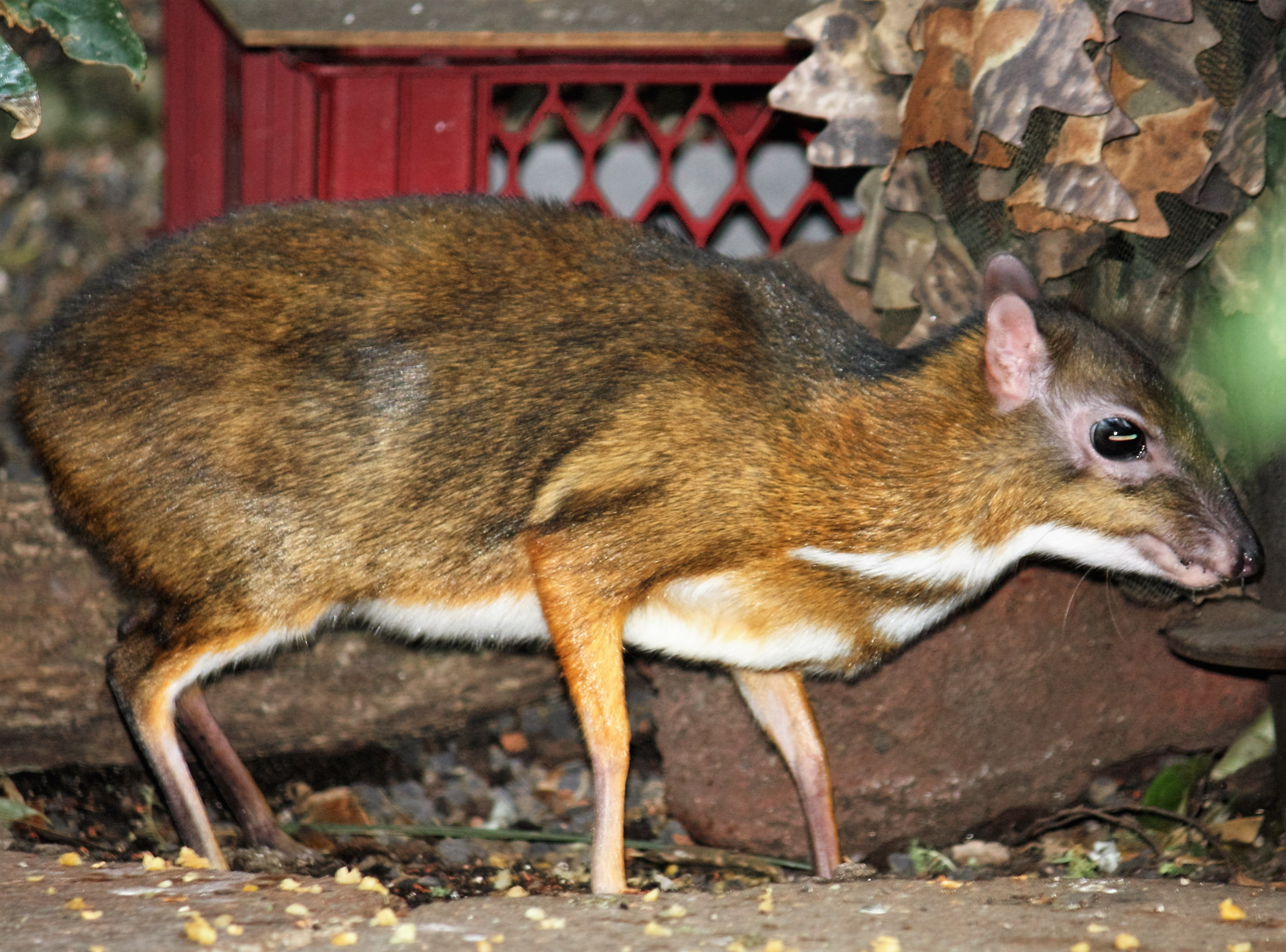
- At Tierpark Hellabrunn

Conservation status
- Least Concern (IUCN 3.1)

Scientific classification
- Kingdom: Animalia
- Phylum: Chordata
- Class: Mammalia
- Order: Artiodactyla
- Family: Tragulidae
- Genus: Tragulus
- Species: T. kanchil

Binomial name
- Tragulus kanchil Raffles, 1821
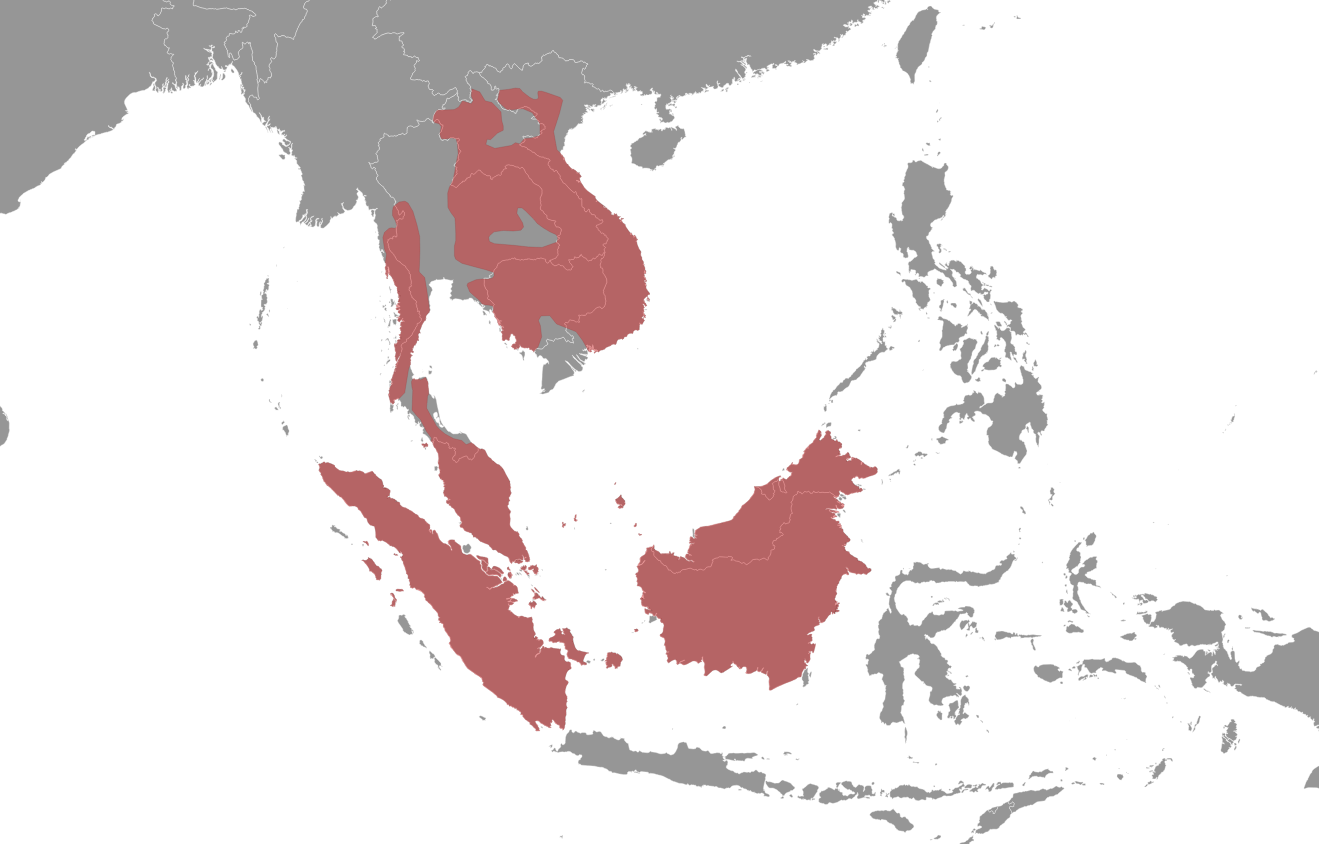

= Lesser mouse-deer =

Species of mammal

The lesser mouse-deer, lesser oriental chevrotain, lesser Malay chevrotain, or kanchil (Tragulus kanchil) is a species of even-toed ungulate in the family Tragulidae.

== Distribution ==
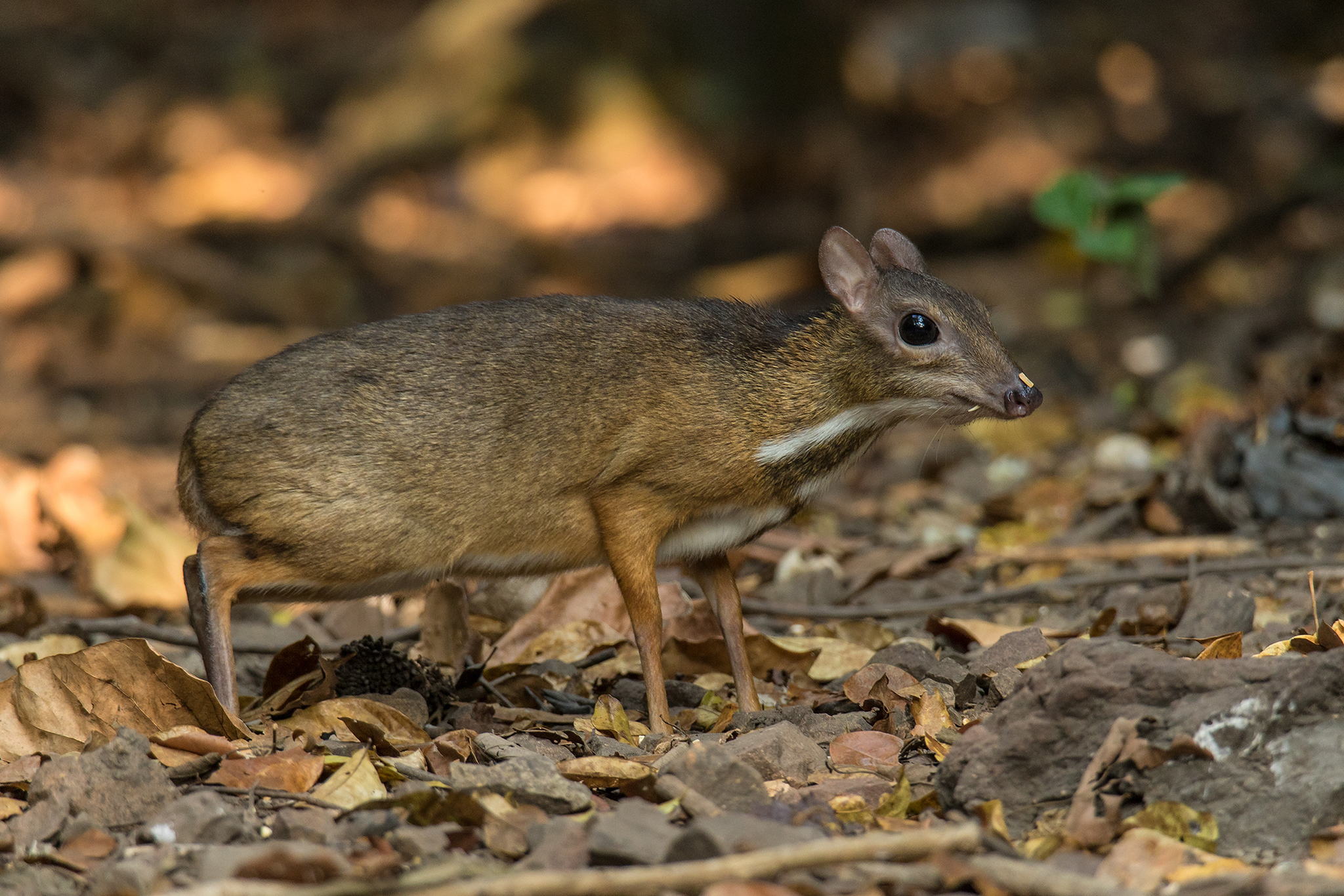
In Thailand

The lesser mouse-deer is found widely across Southeast Asia in Indochina, Myanmar (Kra Isthmus), Brunei, Cambodia, China (Southern Yunnan), Indonesia (Kalimantan, Sumatra and many other small islands), Laos, Malaysia (Peninsular Malaysia, Sarawak and many other small islands), Singapore, Thailand, and Vietnam.

== Description ==
It is one of the smallest known hoofed mammals, its mature size being as little as 45 cm (18 in) and 2 kg (4.4 lb) and related to the even smaller Java mouse-deer. It is threatened by predation by feral dogs.

== Behavior ==
Research revealed that this species which was initially believed to be nocturnal actually conduct their activities during the day. Also, though many births occur in May, November or December, the females are able to reproduce throughout the year.

Males stamp their feet to communicate—possibly as a signal of dominance or resource holding potential.

== Folklore and literature ==
In Indonesian and Malaysian folklore, the mouse-deer Sang Kancil is a cunning trickster similar to Br'er Rabbit from the Uncle Remus tales, even sharing some story plots. For instance, they both trick enemies pretending to be dead or inanimate, and both lose a race to slower opponents.
