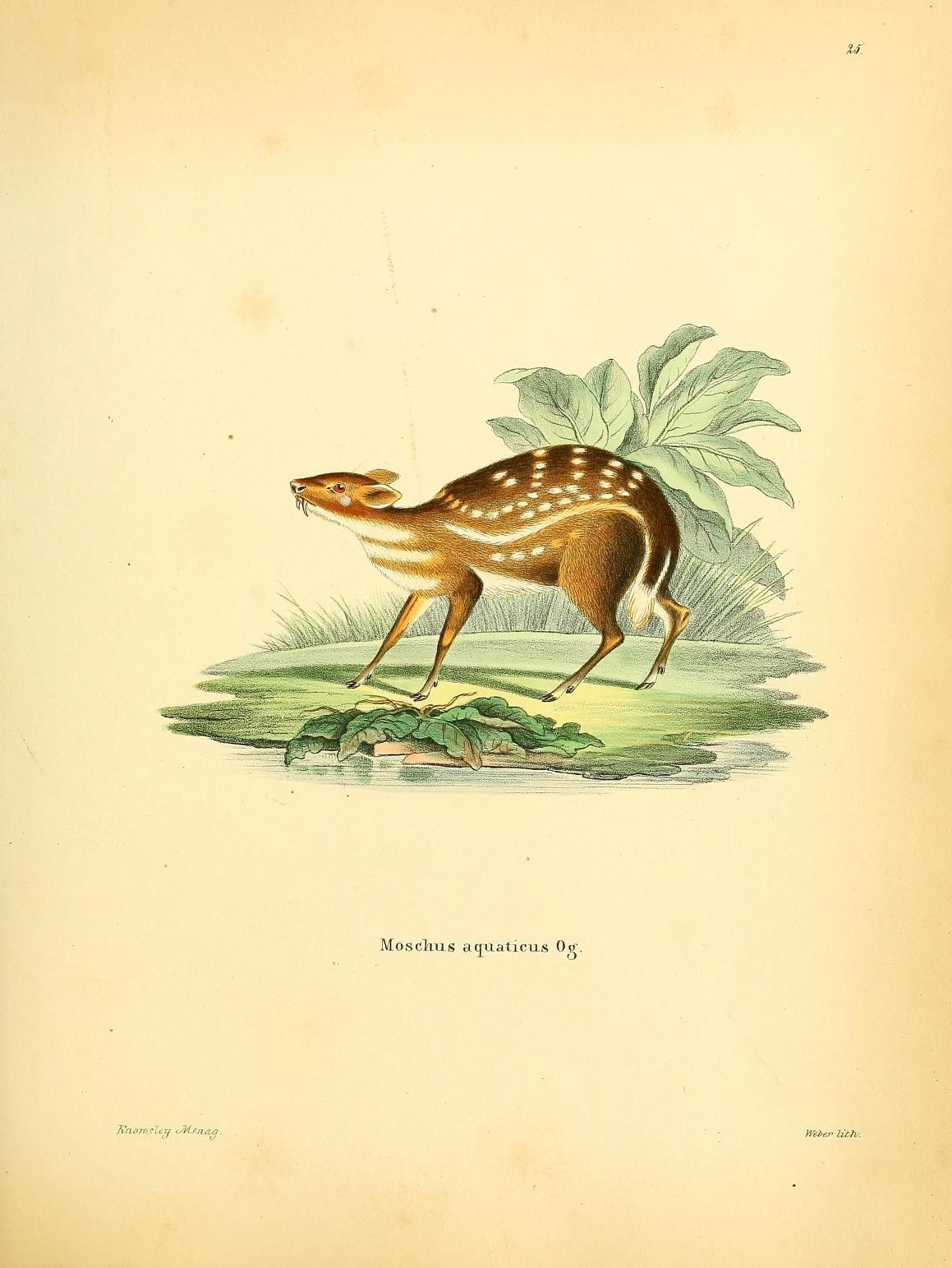
- Illustration of a water chevrotain

Conservation status
- Least Concern (IUCN 3.1)

Scientific classification
- Kingdom: Animalia
- Phylum: Chordata
- Class: Mammalia
- Order: Artiodactyla
- Family: Tragulidae
- Genus: Hyemoschus; Gray, 1845
- Species: H. aquaticus

Binomial name
- Hyemoschus aquaticus Ogilby, 1841
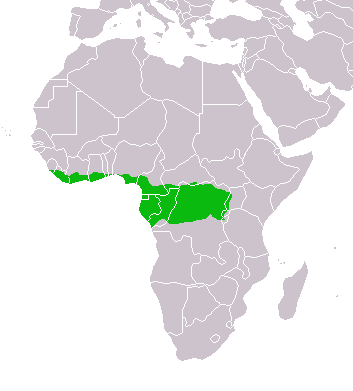
- Water chevrotain range

= Water chevrotain =

Species of mammal

The water chevrotain (Hyemoschus aquaticus), also known as the fanged deer, is a small ruminant found in tropical Africa. This is the only species in the genus Hyemoschus. It is the largest of the 10 species of chevrotains, basal even-toed ungulates which are visually similar to deer, but are barely larger than small dogs.

== Description ==
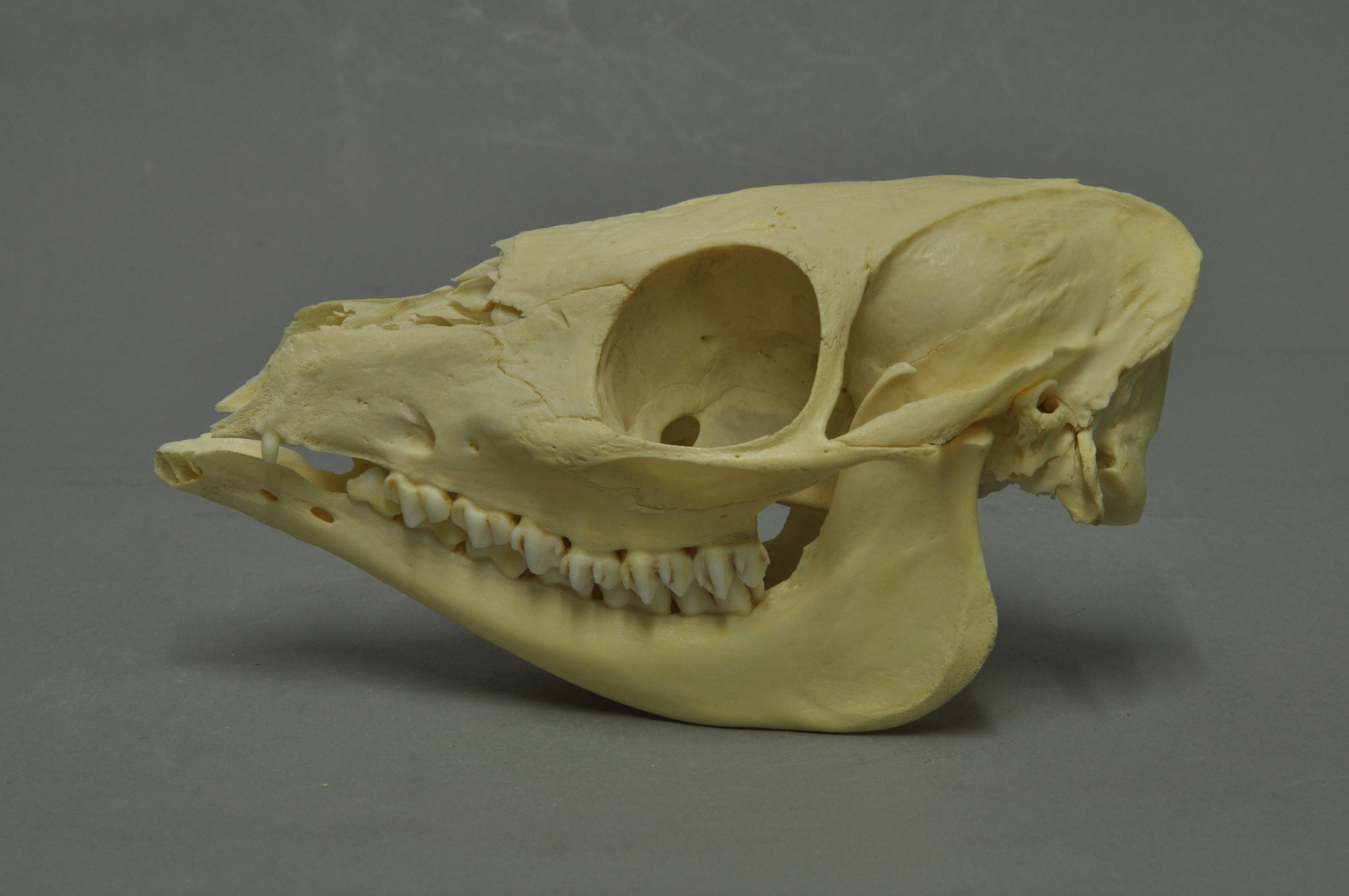
Skull of a water chevrotain

Unusually for most mammals, female water chevrotains are larger than males. On average, they weigh over 2 kg more than the 10-kg males. Their body length is about 85 cm, and their shoulder height is around 35 cm. Water chevrotains have a rich, sleek, red-brown coat on top, and the underside of the coat is white. On the body is a pattern of white stripes that runs horizontally from the shoulder to the tail, with vertical rows of white stripes in the back. The chin, throat, and chest are covered in very coarse hair with a pattern of white V shapes. The back end of the water chevrotain has many powerful muscles and is higher than the shoulders, which makes the body slope down toward the front. The head is held down toward the ground while walking, which allows the water chevrotain to navigate easily through thickets of dense brush. A layer of thick, reinforced skin is on the dorsal surface, which protects the back from injuries caused by the thick brush. The legs look short and thin compared to the bulky body, and the hooves are similar to a pig's. The tail is short with a fluffy white underside that resembles a cotton ball.

== Distribution and habitat ==
The water chevrotain is endemic to the tropical regions of Africa. While it primarily lives in the coastal regions, the species can be found from Sierra Leone to western Uganda. They can be found in closed-canopy, moist, tropical lowland forest, and within this habitat, they only occupy areas within close range to streams or rivers. The area is rarely inhabited by the species if it is further than 250 m away from water. During the day, chevrotains cannot be found outside of the dense forest, but at night, they can be observed in exposed clearings and open river banks.

== Behavior ==
The water chevrotain is exclusively nocturnal, and forages for food in clearings at night. Fallen fruits, such as figs, palm nuts, and breadfruit make up the majority of the water chevrotain's diet, although it has also been known to feed on insects, crabs, and scavenged meat and fish, and is the only species of chevrotain known to do so. It relies on its sense of smell to locate food. During the day, the water chevrotain hides in the dense cover of the African brush. The resting postures of the species include lying down and sitting up. Because they are such a solitary species, the interactions between water chevrotains are only antagonistic and reproductive encounters. Males fight other males, mainly over territory. Their fights are typically short, and in them the two competing males run at each other, mouths open. They poke each other with their muzzles and bite. These aggressive fights are thought to be the reason that mature males normally live no closer than several kilometers apart. The water chevrotain makes several different noises, which include a scream when injured/wounded and an alarm bark. When females fight, they make a high-pitched chattering noise, and when pursuing a female, a male makes a noise through a closed mouth.

== Conservation status ==
The total population of the water chevrotain species estimated to be around 278,000. The ICUN Red List has given the status least concern to the water chevrotain. Because of its solitary nature, very little about its population in each individual country is known, but recent evidence shows the population is declining in some areas.
