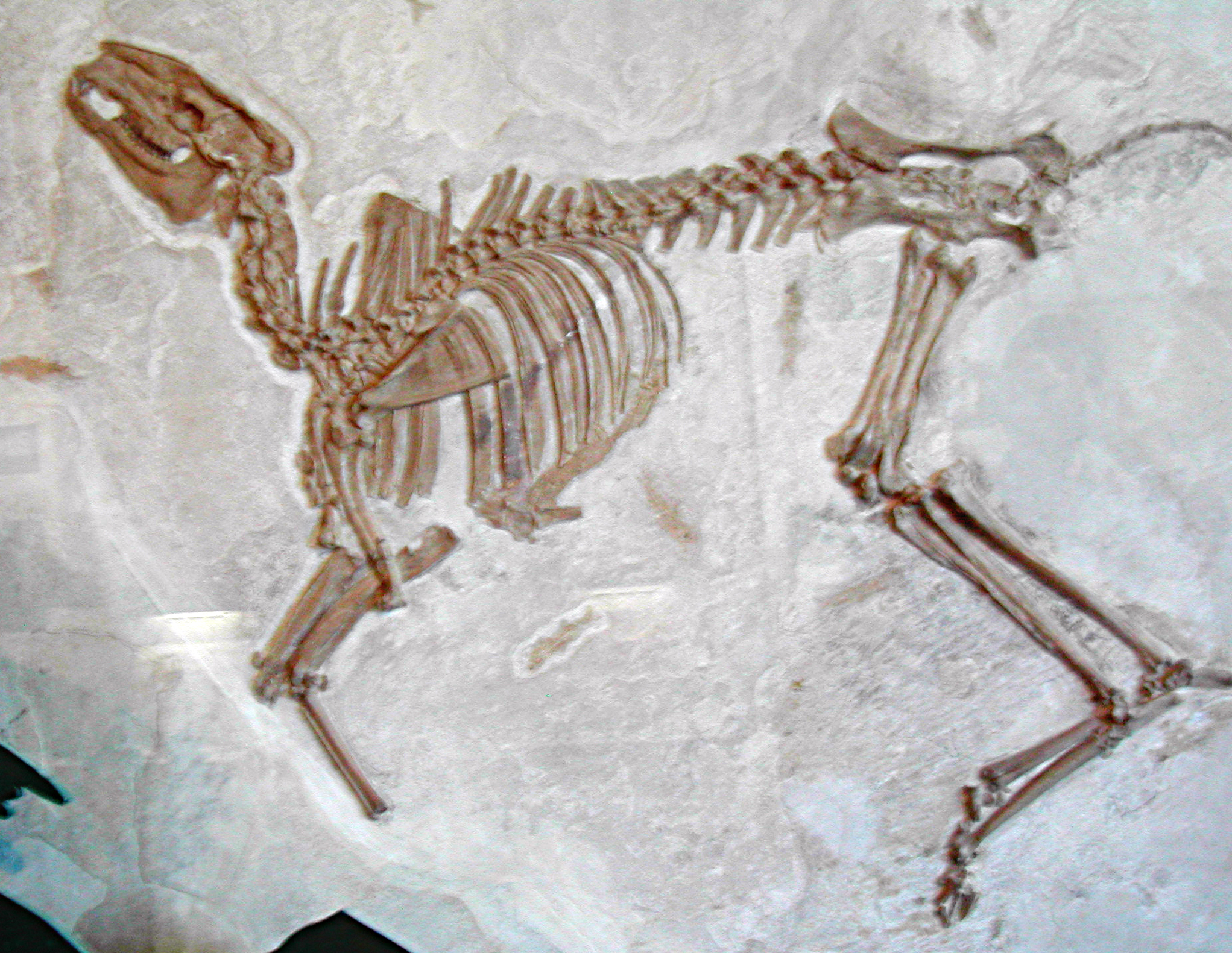
- Bachitherium cf. insigne skeleton, Pierre Martel Museum of Vachères

Scientific classification
- Kingdom: Animalia
- Phylum: Chordata
- Class: Mammalia
- Order: Artiodactyla
- Suborder: Ruminantia
- Infraorder: Tragulina
- Family: †Bachitheriidae; Janis, 1987
- Genus: †Bachitherium; Filhol, 1882

Type species
- †Gelocus curtus (= †Bachitherium curtum) Filhol, 1877

Other species
- †Bachitherium insigne Filhol, 1877; †Bachitherium vireti Sudre, 1986; †Bachitherium lavocati Sudre, 1986; †Bachitherium guirounetensis Sudre, 1995; †Bachitherium thraciensis Mennecart et al., 2018; Species pending reassessment: †Bachitherium sardus van der Made, 2008

Synonyms
- Synonyms of B. curtum: Gelocus curtus Filhol, 1877; Bachitherium medium Filhol, 1882; Synonyms of B. insigne: Gelocus insignis Filhol, 1877

= Bachitherium =

Bachitherium Temporal range: Late Eocene to Late Oligocene, 37.71–24 Ma

Extinct genus of mammals

Bachitherium is an extinct genus of Paleogene ruminants that lived in Europe from the late Eocene to the late Oligocene. The genus was erected in 1882 by Henri Filhol based on fossil remains found in the Quercy Phosphorites Formation. Bachitherium curtum was defined the type species, and another species called B. insigne; five more species have since been named although one, B. sardus, is currently pending reassessment. The genus name derives from "Bach", the French locality where its first fossils were found, and the Greek θήρ/therium meaning "beast". Bachitherium has historically been assigned to various families within the ruminant infrorder Tragulina, but was reclassified to its own monotypic family Bachitheriidae by Christine Janis in 1987.

For much of its taxonomic history, Bachitherium was only known from incomplete remains, making assessments difficult. However, a nearly complete skeleton of B. cf. insigne was uncovered in the commune of Céreste in France in 1981, which helped palaeontologists understand its morphology compared to other ruminants. The complete fossil revealed that Bachitherium had cursorial limb builds unlike typical tragulines and like smaller-sized members of the infraorder Pecora. In addition, its dentition differs from other traguline families such as the Tragulidae, Hypertragulidae, and Leptomerycidae by a combination of a tusklike but reduced bottom first incisor, strong upper canine, caniniform first bottom premolar, and other evolutionarily derived traits unique to the genus.

Based on its dental and limb morphologies, B. curtum, weighing 7 kg (15 lb) to 8 kg (18 lb), was well-adapted to closed forest environments and ate a mix of leaves, fruit, and herbages. In comparison, the larger B. insigne, weighing up to 36 kg (79 lb), was more cursorial and therefore built for more open forested environments and a diet consisting mainly of leaves. The morphological differences between the species, combined with their frequent appearances in the same fossil deposits, imply niche partitioning based on their different ecological niches. The last species B. lavocati probably evolved from B. curtum and was likely better adapted to open forested environments than other species of its genus, coinciding with major climatic and faunal restructurings.

Bachitherium is the earliest-known ruminant to have appeared in the European fossil record, originating in eastern Europe during the late Eocene and migrating to western Europe by the early Oligocene after major seaway barriers fell. The genus remained endemic to the continent and survived several waves of climatic changes of the Oligocene without evolving into a new genus. The Microbunodon Event in the late Oligocene, however, led to its extinction as it faced a combination of a warming climate plus subsequent habitat turnover and competition from a new wave of migrating species.

== Taxonomy ==
=== Early history ===
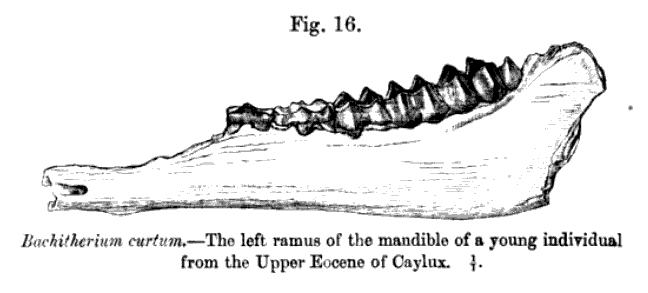
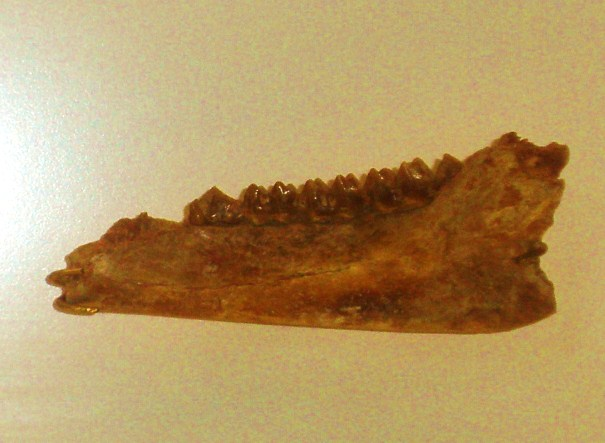
Sketch of a Bachitherium curtum left ramus of a mandible in an 1885 fossil mammals catalogue for the British Museum of Natural History (left) and a photo of a Bachitherium curtum mandible at the same museum (right).

The French palaeontologist Henri Filhol described two fossil artiodactyl genera from the lime phosphate deposits of the French province of Quercy that he thought indicated the Eocene epoch in 1882. He thought that the first genus belonged to the Moschidae family and must be closely affiliated with Gelocus. According to Filhol, the lower dental formula of the genus was 3:1:3:3, and the genus was characterized by its compressed lower premolars, with the posterior edge extending as a deep furrow. It was therefore differentiated from Gelocus in that the newer genus had all compressed lower premolars whereas only the last premolar of Gelocus, which has four premolars total, was compressed. The incisors, he observed, were quite small, while the canine immediately following them was strong. Based on these traits, Filhol erected the genus name Bachitherium, basing its etymology on "Bach," a location of phosphorite deposits. The first species, B. insigne, was determined to be a large animal while B. medium was much smaller than B. insigne but larger than the smallest species B. minus.

In 1885, the English naturalist Richard Lydekker placed Bachitherium provisionally in the family Tragulidae (chevrotains/mouse-deer/tragulids) and listed the species Bachitherium curtum, for which he made "Gelocus curtum" and "Bachitherium medium" synonyms of because the specimens appeared to have belonged to the same species (notably, Filhol described the species "Gelocus curtus" and "Gelocus insignis" in 1877 prior to the erection of Bachitherium). Lydekker stated that Bachitherium was known only by some portions of the mandible and maxilla, that it was said to be closely allied to Gelocus but differed by its first lower premolar. He stated that the dental formula of Bachitherium was ?.?.3.33.1.3.3, that the upper cheek of the genus closely resemble that of Prodremotherium. Additionally, he also confirmed B. insigne as a valid species.

In 1886, the German palaeontologist Max Schlosser erected the genus Cryptomeryx for which he made Lophiomeryx gaudryi, as described by Filhol in 1877, and Bachitherium minus synonyms of the species Cryptomeryx gaudryi. In 1986, however, Geneviève Bouvrain, Denis Geraads and Jean Sudre revised Cryptomeryx as a synonym of Lophiomeryx.

In 1957, the palaeontologist Friedlinde A. Obergfell erected a newer species of Bachitherium named B. serum from the German locality of Wintershof-West. He said that it resembled B. insigne from the phosphorite sites of Quercy based on the entoconid being connected to the metaconid on both the P_{3} and P_{4} teeth, leaving a valley on the tip from the protoconid to the entostylid. In 1971, Léonard Ginsburg created a genus named Andegameryx, of which A. andegaviensis is the type species. He acknowledged the similarities between B. insigne and "B. serum" but noticed that unlike Bachitherium, the tooth valley of "B. serum" is not, at least on the P_{4}, closed on the rear; it instead turns inward and opens at the posterior lingual angle of the tooth. Because of this and other dental traits of the species, the taxon was reclassified to Andegameryx as the species A. serum.

As a result of the perceived closeness of the genus to Gelocus, Bachitherium was normally placed within the Gelocidae, although the palaeontologist René Lavocat placed it in the Hypertragulidae in 1946 based on the bachitheriid's tusk-like P_{1} (premolar) teeth, and in 1980, S. David Webb and Beryl E. Taylor placed it in the Leptomerycidae by diagnosis of a large mastoid fissure of the temporal bone and enlarged I_{1} (incisor) teeth.

=== Modern revisions of Paleogene ruminants ===
Genevieve Bouvrain and Denis Geraads reviewed Bachitherium as a genus in 1984, examining the cast of a sub-complete skeleton from the Oligocene limestone locality of Cereste, France in addition to previously collected Quercy materials. The skeleton was referred to as a Bachitherium species of large size (Bachitherium cf. insigne), and until then, it only had jaws for fossil remains. The researchers discussed Webb and Taylor's 1980 placement of Bachitherium in the Leptomerycidae. They first reviewed the basic diagnosis of the hypertragulids, a primitive ruminant family with numerous characteristics distinct from other ruminants such as sharp cutting premolars and loss of the mesostyle in the molars. In comparison, the only dental trait the hypertragulids shared with Bachitherium is the caniniform P_{1}, validating the previous reassignment from the Hypertragulidae. However, Bouvrain and Garaads also observed that although it shared I_{1} being developed into a tusk similar to leptomerycids, it was very reduced unlike them, therefore not belonging to the family due to the lack of autapomorphy shared with them. Furthermore, the C^{1} is reduced and the P_{1} tooth is small and separated by the diastema of the canine as with the P_{2} in early leptomerycids like Leptomeryx, the later leptomerycids such as Pseudoparablastomeryx losing their P_{1}. These traits strongly contrast with Bachitherium, which has a strong C^{1} and a caniniform P_{1} tooth.

By 1986, Jean Sudre conducted a close study of Bachitherium, which then had just two species in its name and were reported additionally in Italy, Switzerland, and Germany. Bachitherium was considered to have characterized the middle Oligocene (Stampian), although the specimens from southern Germany were thought to characterize the lower Oligocene. In the palaeontological locality of Itardies in Quercy, two species were determined by Sudre to have characterized the 19th-century Quercy collections of the site: the abundant B. curtum and the newer species B. vireti, which was much rarer. At the Pech Desse locality in Quercy (the most recent site at the former province at the time), a second new species, B. lavocati was recognized by the palaeontologist, differing from B. curtum by the size of the diastema between the P^{1} and P^{2}. He also reviewed the systematics of the genus, confirming that B. curtum (Filhol 1877) was the type species.

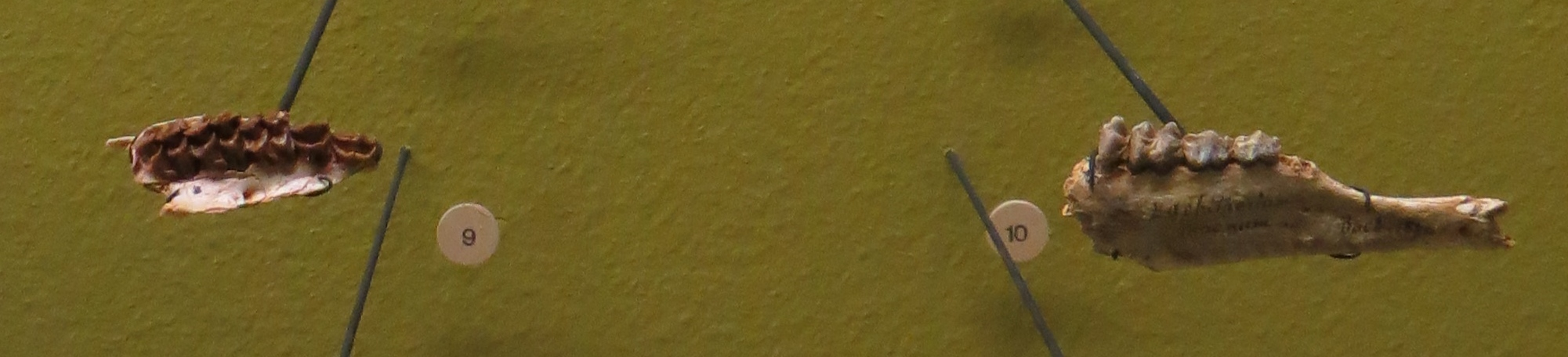
Bachitherium insigne mandible remains, Natural History Museum of Basel

In 1987, the British palaeontologist Christine Marie Janis wrote a journal questioning and revising traguline clades such as Bachitherium, in which the recent discovery of the complete skeleton of the genus and her investigation of the European dental material of it could enable a reassessment of the ruminant. Janis verified Bachitherium not belonging to the Hypertragulidae in that despite the tusk-like caniniform P_{1}, the former was more advanced based on dental and postcranial evidence. Bachitherium, the palaeontologist argued, could be excluded from the Tragulidae and Hypertragulidae families because of a combination of features of its limb anatomy. Nonetheless, Bachitherium's caniniform P_{1} was more similar to hypertragulids than those of the Leptomerycidae which was characterized by their more conical P_{1} teeth. Janis said that the hypothesis that a caniniform P_{1} is a primitive ruminant character would entail the loss of the character twice within the evolution of ruminants in the Tragulidae and Pecora, which she felt was less likely than the alternate hypothesis that it is a derived character state, which would involve three independent evolutions of the character in the Hypertragulidae, the Leptomerycidae, and Bachitherium.

Bachitherium was discerned to have a mixture of primitive and derived dental characteristics, the lower molars retaining the "Dorcatherium" fold ("fold on the posterolingual face of the metaconid") and the posterior lower premolars possessing primitive ruminant conditions of elongated, posteriorly directed metaconids. The hypoconulid of the M_{3} is narrow and somewhat "pinched" in appearance similar to Lophiomeryx. However, Bachitherium was thought to be separate from the leptomerycids based on derived characteristics more similar to "gelocids" and its lack of derived features with the leptomerycids. Unlike the leptomerycids, the I_{1} is small, the "Dorcatherium fold" is retained in the lower molars, and the internal cingulum is retained in the upper molars. Bachitherium is also excluded from the Pecora by the presence of a caniniform P_{1} tooth and the possession of a traguloid type of astragalus (also known as the talus bone or ankle bone). As a result, Christine Janis suggested that the it should be placed as a monotypic genus within the Tragulina, for which she named the family "Bachitheriidae."

Jean Sudre wrote a research article chapter on the Oligocene artiodactyls of the Quercy collections of France in 1995, including the Bachitheriidae. He said that recent diagnoses of many Bachitherium remains supporting the criteria on which the species were based (dental dimensions and diastemas of the P^{1}-P^{2}) were not variable and did not reflect any dimorphism in between species, thereby supporting the distinction between the smaller B. curtum and the larger B. insigne. After reviewing the previous species, Sudre ascertained that another species of Bachitherium could be erected from the Quercy Phosphorites Formation from the locality of Le Garouillas in France, Bachitherium guirounetensis, differing from other species by a few astragali whose dimensions are between those of B. curtum and B. guirounetensis. He also mentioned a Bachitherium sp., which was also known from Le Garouillas based on six astragali and probably a mandible of the P_{4}-M_{3} series. The mandible fragment was referred to the species with some reservation based on its slightly smaller size compared to those attributed to B. guirounetensis. Its P_{4} stood out to Sudre, the paraconid being offset lingually and close to the protoconid, but the palaeontologist speculated that the slight difference is not significant enough for a certain allocation to a different species since it could be interpreted as a variation in the more common B. guirounetensis, found in the same deposit as Bachitherium sp.

In 2008, Jan van der Made reviewed the Oschiri fauna from the Mediterranean island of Sardinia, which dates back to MN3 (the early Miocene, or within the Burdigalian), or some 20 Ma. It is the oldest-recognized instance of island endemism within the region (fossils dating to the Eocene are known although rare, but the faunas do not display endemism since the landmass had not separated from the European plate yet). In his previous 1999 list of the large mammals of the early Miocene of Sardinia, he listed Bachitherium?, in which he would eventually erect the species Bachitherium sardus, basing the species etymology on the island. He based it off of postcranial remains that have the general morphologies of primitive ruminants and sizes intermediate to Tragulus and Hyemoschus.

=== Increased role of biostratigraphy ===
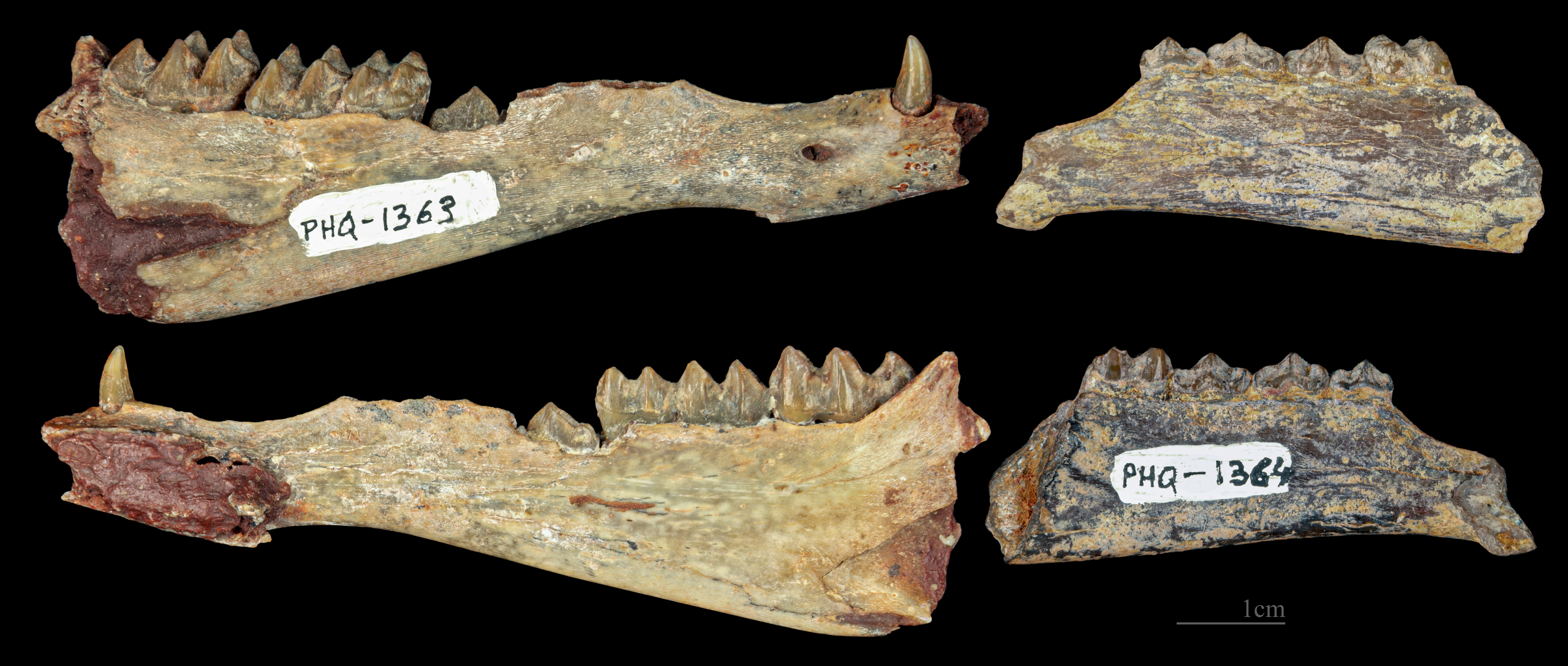
Bachitherium curtum maxillae originally from Tarn-et-Garonne, France dating to the Oligocene, now stored at the Muséum de Toulouse.

Bastien Mennecart reviewed the post-Grande Coupure artiodactyls of Europe in his 2012 PhD thesis, including all known species of Bachitherium from previous decades. He documented the biostratigraphical distribution of western European ruminants during the early-middle Oligocene by Mammal Paleogene zones. In the distribution chart, he listed B. curtum as ranging from MP22-MP27, B. insigne from MP23-27, B. vireti in MP23, B. guirounetensis from MP25, B. lavocati from MP28, and Bachitherium sp. from MP25-26. According to Mennecart, Bachitherium sp. was first reported in 1986 by Jean Sudre at Le Garouillas in France and has since been found in multiple sites in France and Italy. He also defined the etymology of the genus, the prefix "Bach" referring to the old collections of the Quercy site and the suffix "therium" meaning "wild beast or animal." He also defined the etymologies of the species names, "curtum" and "insigne" translating in Latin to "shortened" and "distinguished" respectively, "vireti" being in honor of Jean Viret, "guirounetensis" being unknown, and "lavocati" being in honor of Lavocati for studying the lower dentition of Bachitherium and thereby advancing knowledge of the genus.

Additionally, Mennecart made a brief mention of the Sardinian artiodactyl B. sardus per van der Made in 2008, stating that the species is based only on postcranial remains and that the association of characteristics does not allow for a strict attribution of the remains to Bachitherium. The shape of the postcranial remains resembling those of primitive ruminants could potentially be due to insular effects similar to the Pleistocene-Holocene bovid Myotragus. In 2017, Mennecart et al. said that the islands of Sardinia and Corsica separated from the mainland by the early Miocene, in which then the Sandinian insular Neogene fossils represented the oldest case of endemism in the Mediterranean Sea. However, they also warned that except for Sardomeryx oschiriensis, the assigned names are to be taken with caution since the materials are generally fragmented and mainly based on postcranial remains, which most often are prone to insular adaptations from the now-extinct animals.

In June 2018, Bastien Mennecart et al. described the earliest known European ruminant from the Thrace Basin, which is located mostly within the European area of Turkey as well as Bulgaria and Greece. The area is known for having three Paleogene formations that were found during extensive geographical mapping by drilling. The basal breccia-conglomerate-sandstone formation's exact age, although known to be of Eocene age, has an unknown exact age that cannot be possible to deduce because of factors such as a lack of biostratigraphically useful fossils. Since the terrestrial formation is overlain by two marine formations of Priabonian age, however, the basal formation could be estimated to date from the latest Bartonian or early Priabonian (late Eocene). Within the locality, Mennecart et al. reported the oldest Paleogene ruminant from Europe as well as the earliest one known from outside Asia and North America, dating well before the Grande Coupure faunal event in western Europe which dated back to the Eocene-Oligocene transition. The researchers decided that the fossil material belongs to a new species for which they named Bachitherium thraciensis. The holotype and only specimen is a right mandible with P_{2}-M_{3}, which was found south of the Bulgarian village of Sladun near the border of Bulgaria and Turkey. The species was described as small and differing from other Bachitherium species by the structure of its P_{3} being similar to that of P_{2}.

The researchers also reviewed reports of the supposed previously oldest Bachitheriidae from the German localities of Herrlingen1, Möhren13, Ronheim1, and Weinheim (Palaeontological Museum, Munich) that date back to 32.5 Ma (MP22). The German ruminant fossils were reclassified to the gelocid species Gelocus villebramarensis and Gelocus communis because they have bifurcated and shortened postentocristids that are close to the diagnosis of Gelocus and not Bachitherium. The fossils also have upper molars that possess a strong cingulum that surrounds the protocone, whereas in Bachitherium, the cingulum is only more emergent. Therefore, the actual oldest record of the Bachitheriidae in western Europe is ca. 31 Ma (MP23).

=== Classification ===
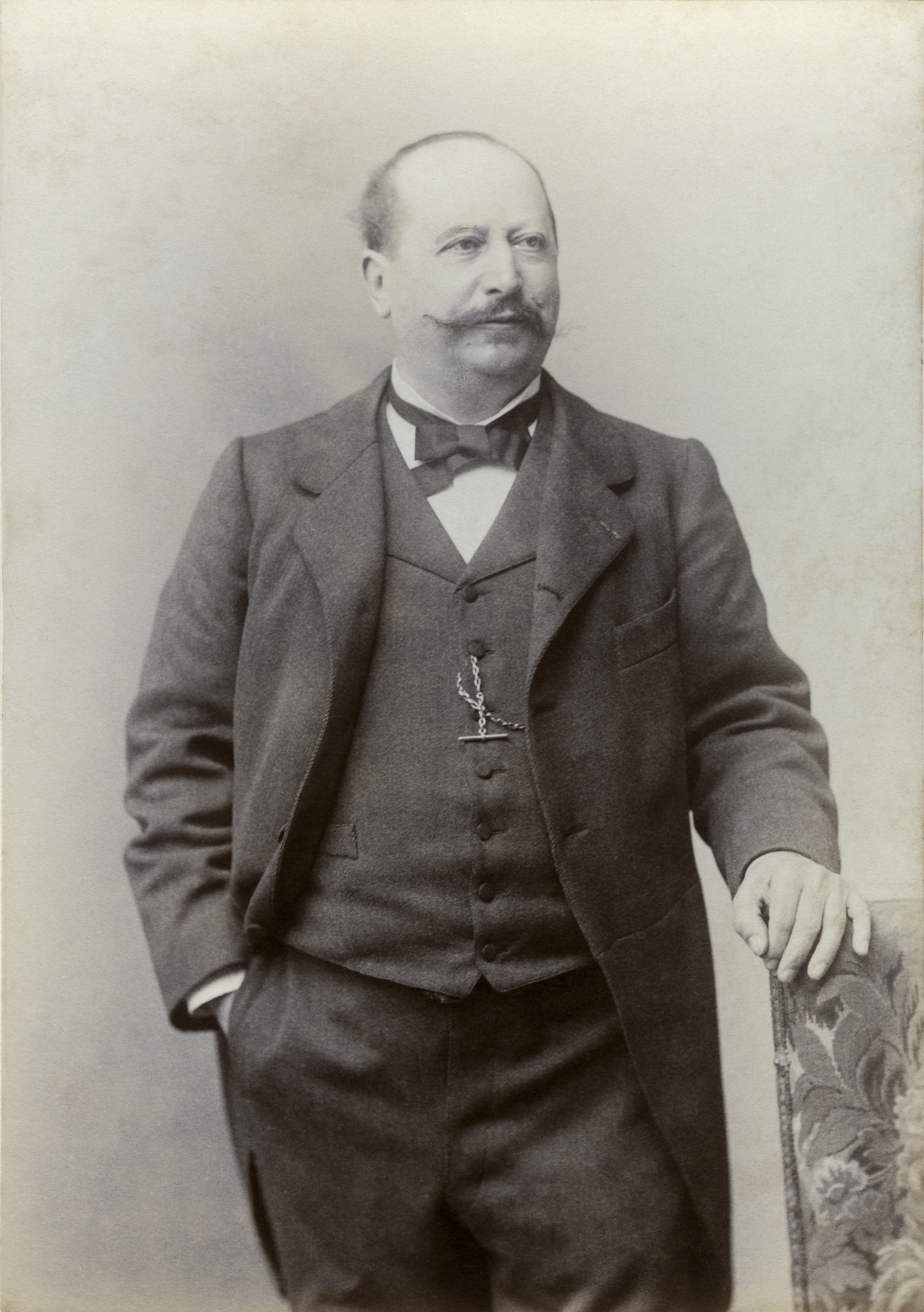
Portrait of Henri Filhol, who erected the genus Bachitherium.

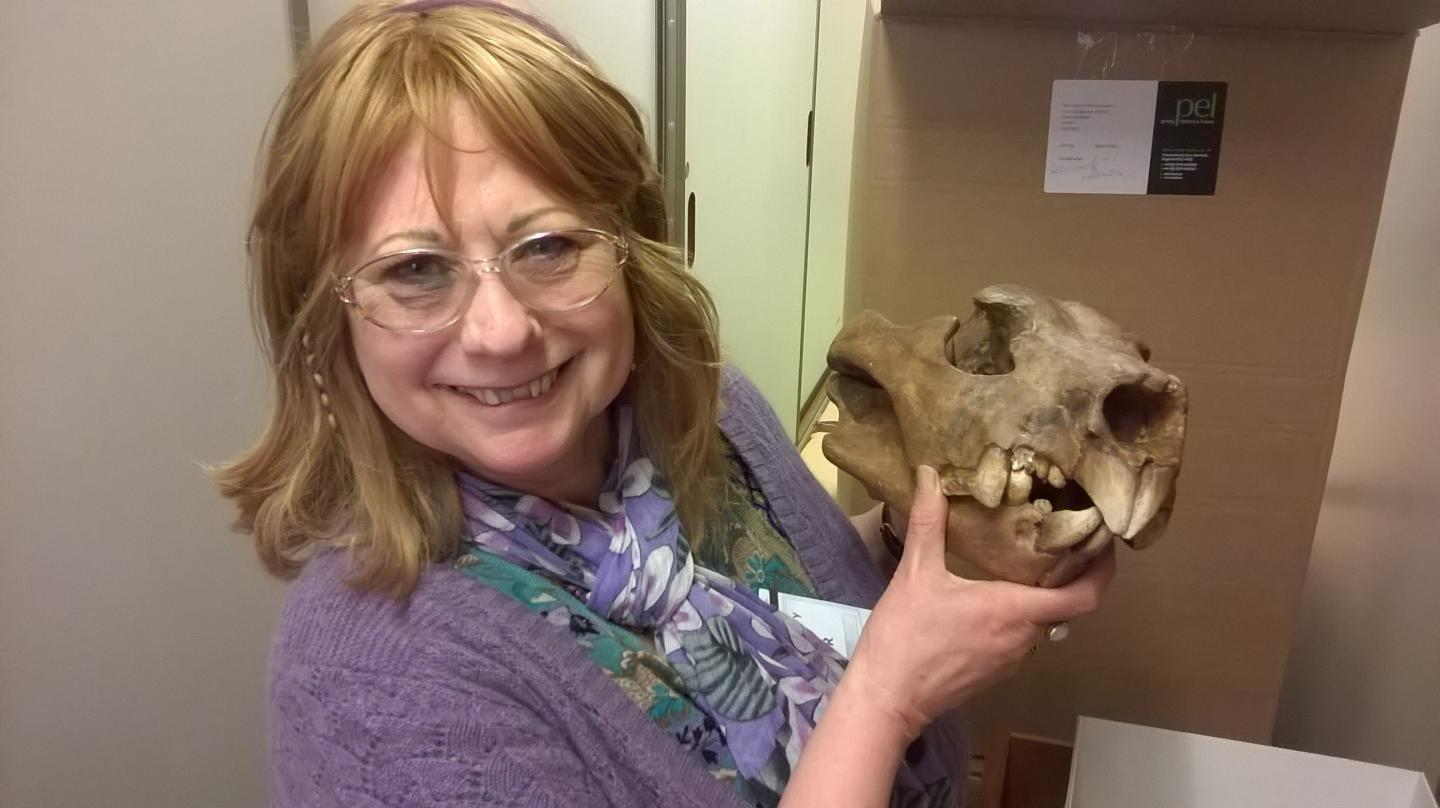
Picture of Christine Janis, who created the family Bachitheriidae.

Bachitherium is the type and only genus of the family Bachitheriidae within the infraorder Tragulina in the artiodactyl suborder Ruminantia. Tragulina is more basal than Pecora and is characterized by doglike astragalus trochleas, a lack of posterolingual cristids on P_{4} teeth, a Dorcatherium fold (or similar cuspid structures) on the lower molars, and bunoselenodont dentition on the molars. The Tragulidae (its members commonly known as "chevrotains" or "mouse deer") is the only extant family of the infraorder and are, as a result, considered living fossils, since they had changed little in the evolutionary record. Bachitherium is technically considered a mammal of Asian origin based on its geographical origins being that of eastern Europe as opposed to the Eocene landmass Balkanatolia or western Europe, which became isolated from North America and Greenland by the later early Eocene and thereby had faunas that evolved in the form of distinct endemism compared to the rest of Eurasia (Bachitherium is not found in Asia). This is especially evident after the abrupt Grande Coupure extinction event within the MP20-MP21 boundary (which includes the Eocene-Oligocene boundary), which marks the base of the Rupelian at 33.9 Ma. The first true ruminants to appear in western Europe, the Gelocidae and Lophiomerycidae, were immigrant taxa that dispersed from Asia while most mammal lineages of western Europe, most of which were endemic to the continent, disappeared.

Several researchers such as Innessa Anatolevna Vislobokova have considered the two superfamilies within the infraorder, the Traguloidea (Tragulidae, Gelocidae, Leptomerycidae, Archaeomerycidae, Lophiomerycidae, Bachitheriidae) and Hypertraguloidea (Hypertragulidae, Praetragulidae), to be valid. The superfamily Traguloidea is sometimes used in systemic palaeontological diagnoses, plus Janis and Jessica M. Theodor defined Hypertraguloidea as a valid superfamily consisting of the Hypertragulidae and Praetragulidae based on the fusion of the magnum and trapezoid bones in the carpus, a trait unseen in other artiodactyls. The two superfamilies are not often mentioned in research papers on members of the Tragulina, however.

In 2015, Bastien Mennecart and Grégoire Métais created a hypothesis on the phylogenetic relationships of Oligocene ruminants by compiling a matrix of 40 dental, cranial, and postcranial features known from them. The taxa included in the analysis are 20 ruminant species representative of the European and Asian "Gelocidae" (a known wastebasket family), Bachitheriidae, late Oligocene or early Miocene Pecora of ambiguous affinities, Lophiomerycidae, Tragulidae, Leptomerycidae, Archaeomerycidae, and Hypertragulidae. Below are two phylogenetic trees of the defined Oligocene ruminants, the first based on a 50% majority consensus and the second based on a strict consensus:

- - Archaeomeryx optatus
  - - Miomeryx altaicus
    - - Leptomeryx evansi
      - Hypertragulus calcaratus
    - - Lophiomeryx chalaniati
      - - Gelocidae
          Gelocus communis
        - Crown Ruminantia
          - Tragulidae
            - Archaeotragulus krabiensis
            - Iberomeryx minor
          - - Notomeryx besensis
            - Indomeryx cotteri
          - - Bachitherium curtum
            - Bachitherium insigne
          - - Gobiomeryx dubius
            - - Mosaicomeryx quercyi
              - Prodremotherium elongatum
              - Pseudomeryx gobiensis
              - - Amphitragulus elegans
                - Amphitragulus quercyi
                - Crown Pecora
                  - Dremotherium guthi
                  - Dremotherium feignouxi

- - Archaeomeryx optatus
  - - - Leptomeryx evansi
      - Hypertragulus calcaratus
    - - - Notomeryx besensis
        - Indomeryx cotteri
        - Miomeryx altaicus
      - - Lophiomeryx chalaniati
        - - Gelocidae
            Gelocus communis
          - Crown Ruminantia
            - Tragulidae
              - Archaeotragulus krabiensis
              - Iberomeryx minor
            - - - Bachitherium curtum
                - Bachitherium insigne
              - - Gobiomeryx dubius
                - - Mosaicomeryx quercyi
                  - Prodremotherium elongatum
                  - - Amphitragulus elegans
                    - Amphitragulus quercyi
                    - - Dremotherium guthi
                      - Dremotherium feignouxi
                      - Pseudomeryx gobiensis

Mennecart and Métais stated that the systematic position of the monogeneric family Bachitheriidae is somewhat problematic since the uncertain phylogenetic position of the Bachitheriidae with other Oligocene ruminants is due to its postcranial and dental features being similar to other ruminant lineages. Bachitherium is phylogenetically related to other tragulines based on its caniniform P_{1} and traguloid-shaped astragali, but the selenodont molars and fusion of the carpal bones were probably a result of parallel evolution. The convergent traits, the researchers suggested, caused misinterpretations of the phylogenetic relations of Bachitherium in various phylogenetic trees of Paleogene ruminants, most of which were done by hand. Despite having a complete skeleton, the phylogenetic position of the Bachitheriidae with respect to the "crown" Ruminantia (i.e. below or above the Tragulidae) remained unstable. They suggested that basicranial morphological analyses will provide key features to better understanding the evolutionary history of bachitheriids.

In 2021, Bastien Mennecart et al. reused the morphological matrix of some 40 characters from 2015 by Mennecart and Métais (as explained above) to produce a hypothesis regarding the phylogenetic affinities of the Oligocene tragulid Nalameryx using additional remains from the genus. Similar to the research article from 2015, Amphirhagatherium weigelti and Merycoidodon culbertsoni are classified as outgroups within the Artiodactyla due to not falling within the Ruminantia suborder. However, the 2021 phylogenetic tree also adds the enigmatic artiodactyl Stenomeryx, which is typically considered to be either next to the outgroup Amphirhagatherium or as sister taxa of the Bachitheriidae, favouring the former hypothesis over the latter. The Bachitheriidae are considered the sister family to the Tragulidae and are thus phylogenetically within the crown Ruminantia, seemingly supported in part thanks to the Eocene-aged remains recently described from the Balkans. Below is an updated tree based on the 2015 phylogenetic trees by Mennecart and Métais resulting from the cladistic analysis of 41 dental, cranial, and postcranial specimens:

- Ruminantia
  - Archaeomeryx optatus
  - - - Leptomeryx evansi
      - Hypertragulus calcaratus
    - - Lophiomeryx chalaniati
      - - Gelocus communis
        - Crown Ruminantia
          - - - Bachitherium curtum
              - Bachitherium insigne
            - Tragulidae
              - - Nalameryx savagei
                - Nalameryx sulaimani
              - - Archaeotragulus krabiensis
                - Iberomeryx minor
          - Pecora
            - - Notomeryx besensis
              - Indomeryx cotteri
            - - Mosaicomeryx quercyi
              - - Prodremotherium elongatum
                - - Pseudomeryx gobiensis
                  - - Dremotherium feignouxi
                    - - Dremotherium guthi
                      - - Amphitragulus elegans
                        - Amphitragulus quercyi

== Description ==
Although Bachitherium and most other Paleogene ruminants are typically known mostly or only from jaw remains, Bachitherium is also known by a complete skeleton from the limestone deposits of Cereste, France that is attributed to Bachitherium cf. insigne, allowing for more thorough diagnoses for the Bachitheriidae. Unfortunately, the skeleton is strongly flattened transversely, limiting observations of it to only its left side. The sutures of the skull, as a result, are little or cannot be observed. Nonetheless, the complete skeleton and various other remains of Bachitherium allow for distinguishing it as a distinct family compared to other members of the Tragulina infraorder such as the Gelocidae, Lophiomerycidae, Hypertragulidae, Leptomerycidae, and Tragulidae.

Since B. curtum is commonly confused with B. insigne, the major differences between the two species are the former species' smaller teeth, diastema, and postcranial bones compared to the latter.

=== Skull ===
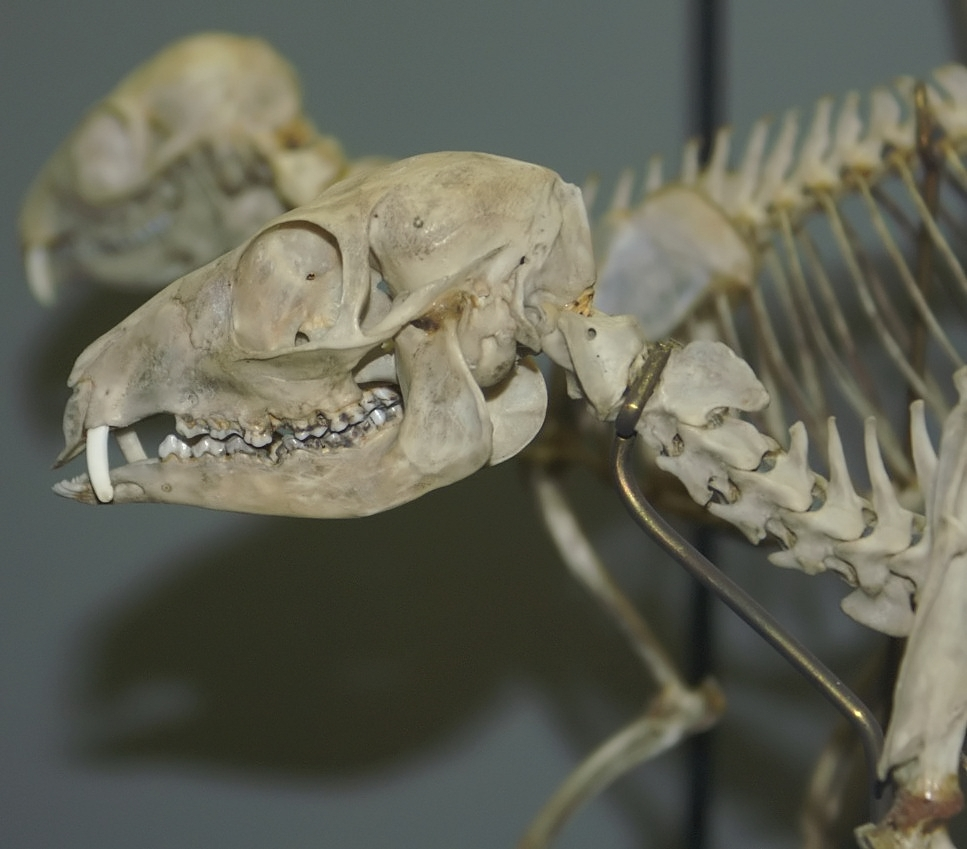
Skeleton of Tragulus javanicus at the Smithsonian National Museum of Natural History in a close-up view of the skull.

A unique trait of Bachitherium is the great development of its face, as the anterior edge of the orbit, although just slightly above the M^{2}, is as far from the anterior edge of the premaxilla as it is from the occipital crest. The premaxillary, being edentulous (lacking teeth), upright, and short, comes into contact with long nasals, broadened behind and ending towards the front. There is a small gap in the ethmoid bone probably bordered by the nasal, maxillary, frontal, and lacrimal bones. The lacrimal fossa appears to be absent from the skull, the lacrimal hole instead opening inside the orbit which is small and closed posteriorly by a complete and robust postorbital bar. The back of the skull, which is slightly inclined with respect to the face, is surmounted by a strong sagittal crest protruding above the occipital face. Forward of the nuchal lines is the auditory hole, separated from a strong paramastoid (or near the mastoid) apophysis (normal developmental outgrowth of a bone) by a mastoid of unknown size. The squamosal suture, visible for a short distance, is oblique forwards and backwards and is pierced by several small foramina.

The horizontal region of the mandible increases in height towards the back, the lower edge having two concavities. Of the two concavities, one is in front of P_{2} while the other is behind M_{3}. The upward angular region of the mandible is wide, its posterior edge connecting to the neck of the condyle in a condyloid process similar to camelids.

Cranial lengths (mm & in) of the Bachitherium cf. insigne skeleton from Cereste, France
Front of premaxilla to occipital condyle	Front of premaxilla to top of occipital crest	Front of nasals to top of occipital crest
183 mm (7.2 in)	208 mm (8.2 in)	197 mm (7.8 in)

=== Dentition ===
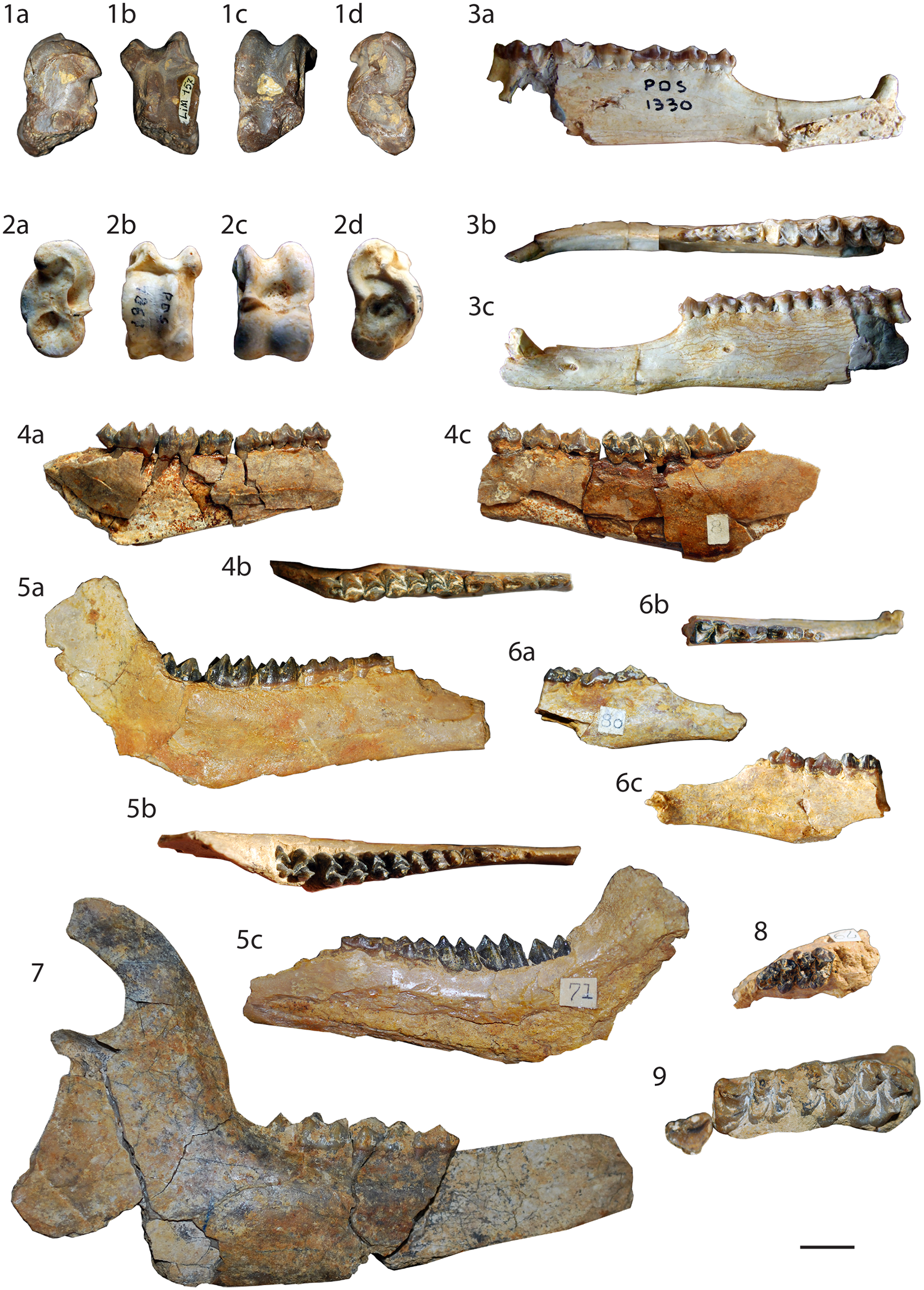
The various specimens of Bachitherium cf. lavocati from Mailhat, France (Specimen 1) and B. lavocati from Pech Desse, France (2-3) and Gaimersheim, Germany (4-9).

Bachitherium is distinguished by its dentition that is closer to the Tragulina than other artiodactyls but are distinct enough to justify it belonging to its own family. The dental formula of the genus is 0.1.3.33.1.4.3, where the P^{1} is evolutionarily lost, thus explaining why it has one less premolar in its upper jaw than its lower jaw. There are also no upper incisors recorded from the skeleton or other related specimens, typical of ruminant traits. The upper canine is curved in a hook-like manner and strong but relatively short since it does not exceed the height of the upper edge of the mandible. The lower canine is also short similar to the upper canine and the lower incisors but is incisiform in shape. In terms of occlusion, the C^{1} is lodged between the caniniform P_{1} of similar size for wearing and the frontal teeth. The diastemas of C^{1}-P^{2} and P_{1}-P_{2} are recorded to be lengthy. The complex of front teeth being very distant from the cheekbones, probably in relation to the strengthening of the adductor musculature, constitutes the main autapomorphy of Bachitherium.

The Bachitheriidae is defined as a traguline family that possesses a narrow and "pinched" hypoconulid on M_{3}, a strong presence of a distally isolated posterolabial cristid on P_{3} and P_{4}, and a strong "Dorcatherium" fold on the molars. It is also different from other traguline genera by the straight outline of the lower mandible and the elongated diastema being highly constricted just after P_{2}. The European Tragulidae (including Iberomeryx of the Paleogene and Dorcatherium of the Neogene) and Bachitheriidae are defined by special traguline-shaped lower premolars that feature a lack of metaconids and two elongated parallel cristids forming the edges of the back valley of the cusp. The lower molars are derived, having relatively selenodont cusps, typical of most ruminants, as well as possessing no cingulum. The upper molars of the Bachitheriidae do not possess any aligned paracone and metacone. Some more recently described dental autapomorphies of the Bachitheriidae are the diastema between P_{1}-P_{2} being longer than that of P_{2}-P_{4} and a shallow external postprotocristid that is not linked to the prehypocristid.

Dental lengths (mm & in) of the Bachitherium cf. insigne skeleton from Cereste, France
C^{1}-P^{2} diastema	P^{2}-P^{4}	M^{1}-M^{3}	P^{2}-M^{3}	C_{1}-P_{1} diastema	P_{1}-P_{2} diastema	P_{2}-P_{4}	M_{1}-M_{3}	P_{2}-M_{3}
41 mm (1.6 in)	25.7 mm (1.01 in)	30.2 mm (1.19 in)	56.5 mm (2.22 in)	7.8 mm (0.31 in)	27.2 mm (1.07 in)	27.7 mm (1.09 in)	33.4 mm (1.31 in)	62.5 mm (2.46 in)

Measurements (mm & in) of the teeth and diastemas of Bachitherium species holotypes
Species	Holotype	Type Locality	Age	Diastema P_{1}-P_{2}	P_{2}-M_{3}	P_{2}-P_{4}	M_{1}-M_{3}
B. thraciensis	NMNHS FM3320	Sladun, Bulgaria	Late Eocene	>14 mm (0.55 in)	_	18 mm (0.71 in)	_
B. vireti	UCBL FSL9672	Nassiet (Landes, France)	Early Oligocene (MP23)	10 mm (0.39 in) - 15 mm (0.59 in)	40 mm (1.6 in) - 42 mm (1.7 in)	18 mm (0.71 in) - 18.2 mm (0.72 in)	23 mm (0.91 in) - 25.2 mm (0.99 in)
B. insigne	MNHN QU4258	Old collections of Quercy, France	Oligocene (MP23-MP27)	38 mm (1.5 in)	63 mm (2.5 in)	25 mm (0.98 in)	37 mm (1.5 in)
B. curtum	MNHN Qu3917	Old collections of Quercy, France	Oligocene (MP23-MP27)	19.5 mm (0.77 in) - 22 mm (0.87 in)	50.5 mm (1.99 in) - 51 mm (2.0 in)	20 mm (0.79 in) - 22 mm (0.87 in)	26.5 mm (1.04 in) - 28 mm (1.1 in)
B. guirounetensis	UM GAR441	Le Garouillas, France	Middle Oligocene (MP25)	27.5 mm (1.08 in)	57.6 mm (2.27 in)	26 mm (1.0 in) - 28 mm (1.1 in)	30.5 mm (1.20 in) - 35.7 mm (1.41 in)
B. lavocati	UM PDS1330	Pech Desse (Lot, France)	Late Oligocene (MP28)	32 mm (1.3 in) - 34 mm (1.3 in)	51 mm (2.0 in) - 52 mm (2.0 in)	20.4 mm (0.80 in) - 22.5 mm (0.89 in)	26 mm (1.0 in) - 32.4 mm (1.28 in)

=== Vertebrae and ribs ===
The cervical vertebrae of the Bachitherium skeleton is short and robust, its total length measuring less than that of the head. On the scapula (or shoulder blade), the spine ends in a strong, hooked acromion, reaching the glenoid fossa. The atlas, also known in the anatomy of the neck vertebrae as C1, possesses wide, rounded anatomical processes (or "wings") that terminate posteriorly at a point exceeding the level of articulation with the axis of the cervical vertebrae (C2). The joints of the atlas reach dorsally almost to the top of the neural canal, of which the anterior member is much shorter than the posterior one. The axis's body is short, but the axis itself is noted to be remarkable for the vertical and especially caudal extension of its high spinous process which reaches the level of C4. The unusual traits of the cervical vertebrae could be connected with the strong development of the large oblique muscles of the head.

The spinal processes are short on C3 and C4 but lengthen from C5 to D1. The lengths of the spinal processes are more or less constant up to D7. The spine is slightly curved backwards from vertebrae C7-D2, then straight on D3-D4, and finally slightly inclined forward until D9. In the spine, there are 13 dorsal vertebrae, 7 lumbar vertebrae (probably sacral), and 17 caudal vertebrae. The sacrum is short because it does not exceed the cavities of the acetabulum. The first ribs of the bachitheriid are wide, short, and straight, contrasting with the later ribs that are thin, long, and curved. The number of sternebrae is not determinable because of the transversely flattened state of the sub-complete skeleton.

=== Limbs ===
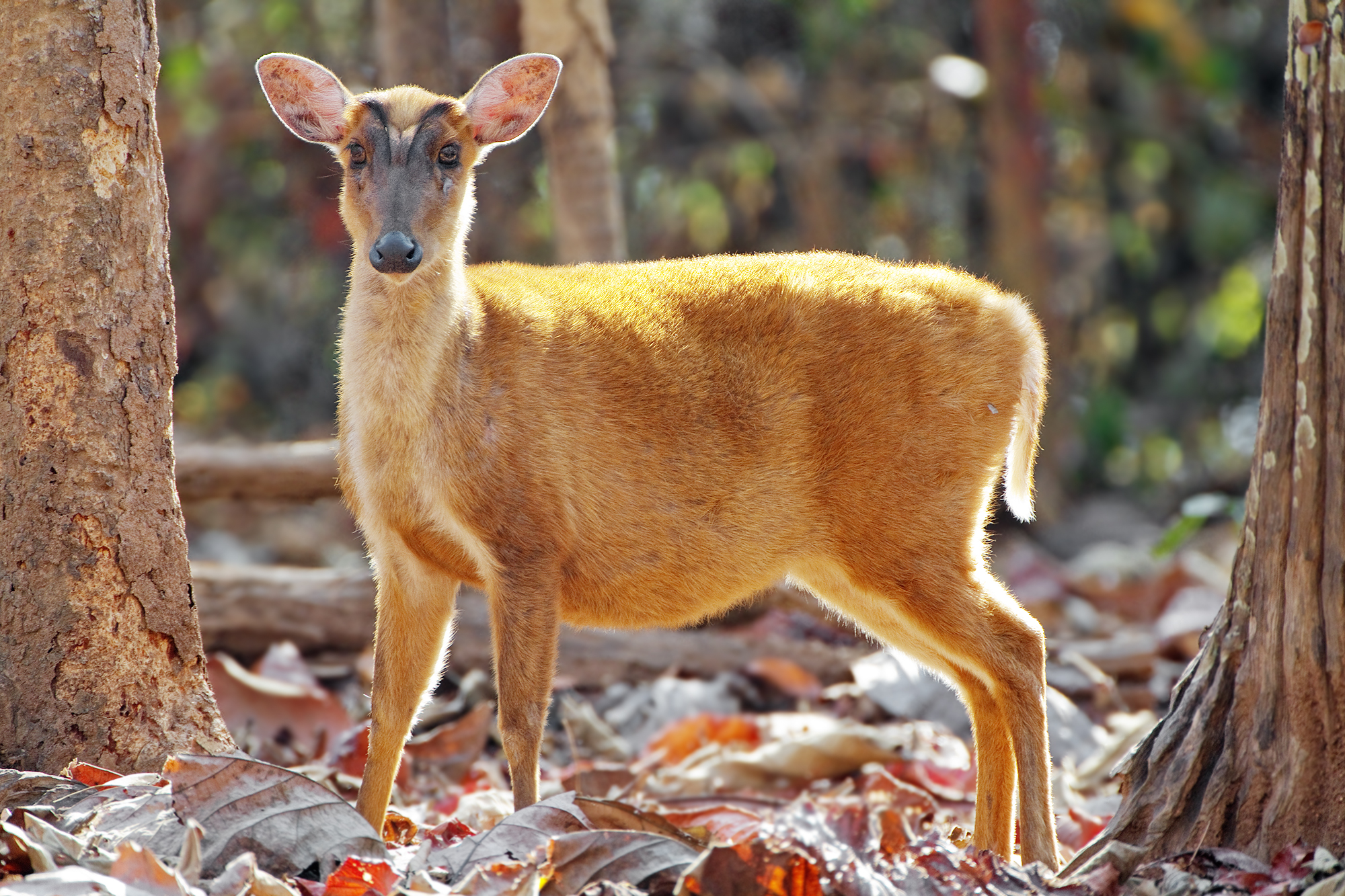
A southern red muntjac (Muntiacus muntjak), a deer species whose cursorial limb proportions Bachitherium is suggested to be similar to.

In bachitheriids, the neck of the humerus is slightly marked, and the tuberosity (prominence where muscles and connective tissues attach) of the tendon of the infraspinatus muscle is strong and oval. There is neither any triceps curve nor deltoid tuberosity present within the humerus. In the distal area of the humerus, the diameter of the condyle is lower than that of the trochlea. The ulna, or one type of long bone found in the forearm, is separated from the radius (the other type of long bone found in the forearm) along its entire length. The olecranon of the ulna is wide and located in the axis of the diaphysis. The pelvis does not have any peculiar traits except for the elongation of the acetabular portion of the hip bone compared to the ilium, although it is still shorter than that of the Tragulidae. The trochanter of the femur is moderately elevated compared to the femoral head. The calcaneus is robust but is shorter than that of camelids.

The forelimbs of Bachitherium are shorter than the hind limbs, but the difference is smaller than in tragulids. The limb proportions are similar to the musk deer (Moschus) or small deer (Muntiacus, Hyelaphus), although the distal limbs in Bachitherium are a little less elongated. The metatarsal bones II and IV (or long bones of the feet) are partially fused (fused except at their distal extremities without a groove (or furrow) on the anterior face) while the metacarpal bones III and IV (or long bones of the hands coming after wrist bones) are unfused. The lateral metacarpals appear to be absent and all of the front phalanges are missing, the former trait being suggested as an autapomorphy of the Bachitheriidae since the skeleton specimen is excellently preserved that the bones being missing could not have been an accident. The first phalanges of the back feet are short compared to the second, while the third are very long with an articular surface being almost perpendicular to the body of the bone. The fusions of the bones appear to be an advanced trait since it is also present in pecoran evolution while the fusions are not always represented in the Tragulidae. Because of this, the Bachitheriidae are considered "advanced" in phylogenetic traits compared to similar tragulines but more "primitive" than early pecorans or their predecessors.

=== Body mass ===
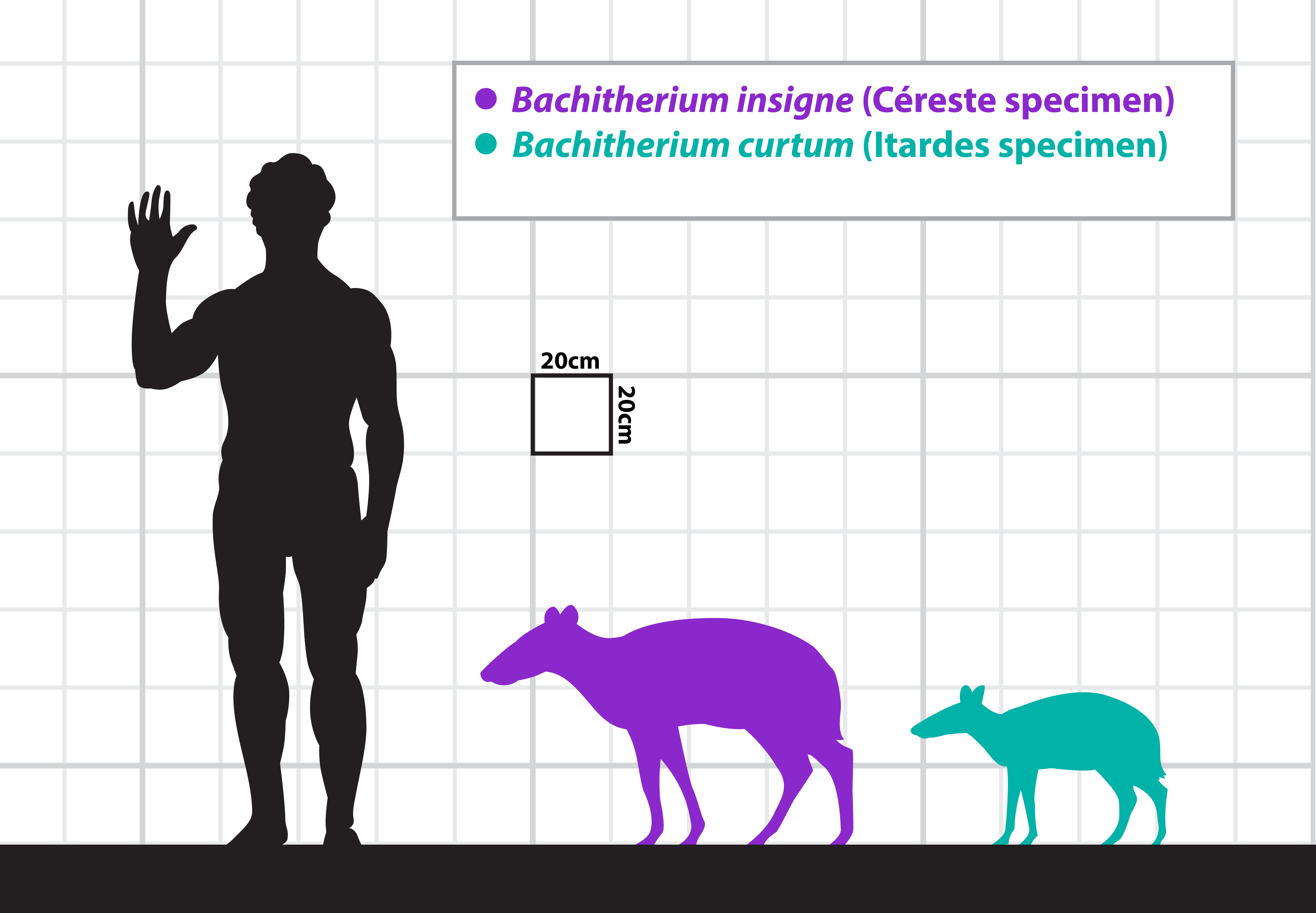
Size estimates of B. curtum and B. insigne

In September 1995, prior to Sudre's publication on B. guirounetensis, he and Jean-Noël Martinez used the dimensions of the astragali of Paleogene artiodactyls to estimate their body masses, since the astragalus is the most frequently postcranial bone in fossil assemblages from its reduction of vulnerability to fragmentation due to its stocky shape and compact structure. Four known Bachitherium species, B. vireti, B. curtum, B. insigne, and B. nov. sp. (the last of which would later be known as B. guirounetensis) were analyzed using two different methods of medial weight estimations: the astragalus size and the M_{1} area, both results shown in the below table:

Comparisons (g and oz) of medial weight estimates from the astragalus size and the M_{1} area
Species	M_{1} Area Weight Estimate	Astragalus Size Weight Estimate	Weight Limit Values
Bachitherium vireti	4,736 g (167.1 oz)	4,553 g (160.6 oz)	4,089 g (144.2 oz) - 5,229 g (184.4 oz)
Bachitherium curtum	6,905 g (243.6 oz)	6,114 g (215.7 oz)	4,772 g (168.3 oz) - 6,959 g (245.5 oz)
Bachitherium lavocati	6,905 g (243.6 oz)	7,722 g (272.4 oz)	4,906 g (173.1 oz) - 12,202 g (430.4 oz)
Bachitherium nov. sp.	12,913 g (455.5 oz)	18,647 g (657.8 oz)	14,104 g (497.5 oz) - 23,808 g (839.8 oz)

In 2014, Takehisa Tsubamoto reexamined the relationship between astragalus size and estimated body mass based on extensive studies of extant terrestrial mammals, reapplying the methods to Paleogene artiodactyls previously tested by Sudre and Martinez. The researcher used linear measurements and their products with adjusted correction factors. The recalculations resulted in somewhat lower estimates compared to the 1995 results (with the exception of the anoplotheriid Diplobune minor, which as a shorter astragalus proportion than most other artiodactyls), displayed in the below graph:

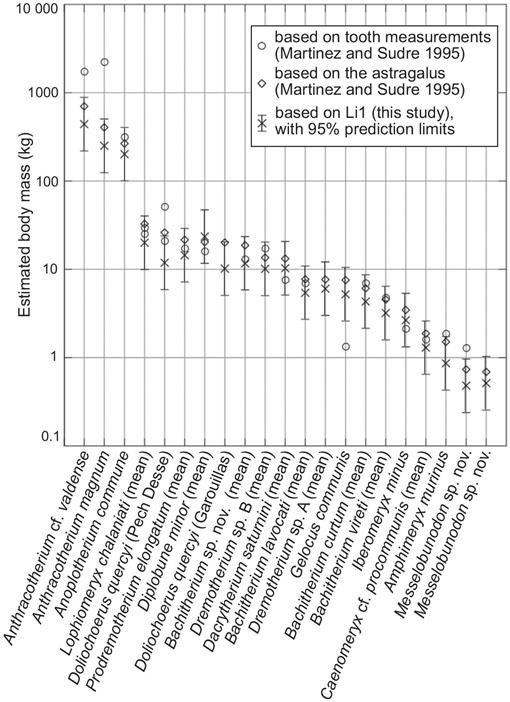
Estimated body masses (kg) of Paleogene artiodactyls based on recalculated trochlear widths (Li1) in comparison to estimates from Martinez and Sudre (1995)

B. lavocati, according to its dental traits, was barely larger as a species than B. curtum, the latter species considered to be the potential ancestor of the former. There is no evidence that B. lavocati, a common species at the Pech Desse locality in France, had any dimorphism, indicating that it was homogenous in nature. Both B. lavocati and B. curtum have been estimated to weigh 7 kg (15 lb) - 8 kg (18 lb), consistent with the idea of similar weights. B. insigne, however, was unusually large in comparison to not just other bachitheriid species but also other Paleogene tragulines, being estimated to weigh up to 36 kg (79 lb). B. insigne overlapping in the MP zones with other species such as B. curtum and B. guirounetensis offers hints of different ecological niches being filled by them within the European continent, as the larger size of B. insigne likely means that it lived in a different habitat and had slightly different eating habits compared to them.

== Palaeobiology ==
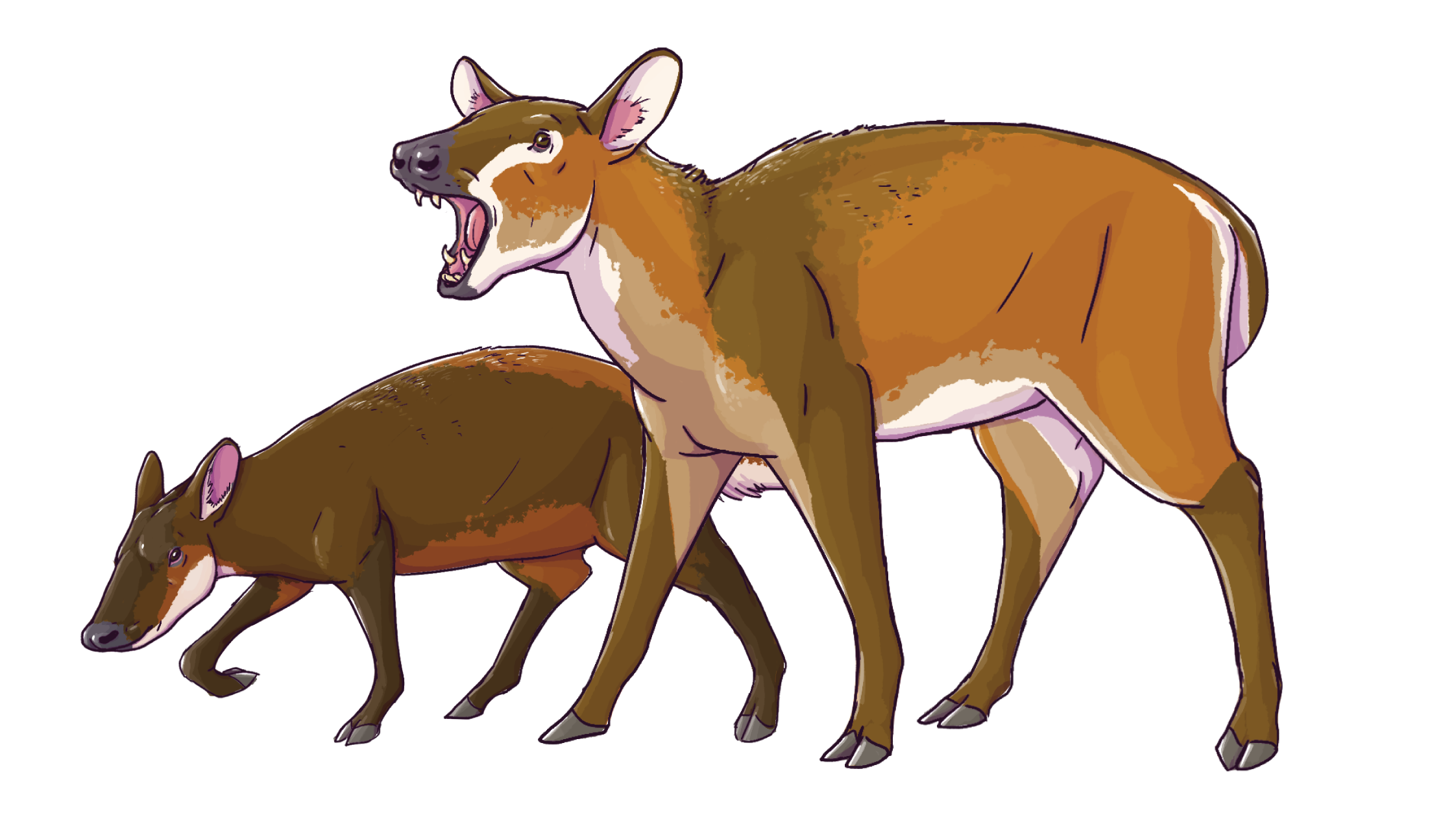
Restorations of B. curtum (left) and B. insigne (right). B. insigne was larger and more cursorial based on limb proportions than B. curtum, making the former adapted to more open habitats and the latter to closed habitats.

Although artiodactyls of the Paleogene are not as popular in palaeobiological research as their Neogene counterparts, there has been efforts in recent decades to contextualize the palaeobiologies of Paleogene ruminants in relation to those of Neogene and modern ruminants. The relatively abundant fossil evidence of different Bachitherium species indicates that virtually none display any signs of sexual dimorphism, although it is unknown whether Bachitherium sp. represents a distinct species from B. guirounetensis. Therefore, the different sizes of the fossil specimens can be explained as belonging to different species that fill different palaeoecological niches from each other and the many other artiodactyls that coexisted with them.

During the Oligocene, B. curtum, a small-sized species, would have lived in warm, humid environments that were either wooded or semi-aquatic in characteristics, evident by its shorter limb proportions. Therefore, its palaeobiogical niches would have been equvivalent to modern-day chevrotains or duikers (tribe Cephalophini/subfamily Cephalophinae), both of which live in humid wooded habitats in Africa and/or southern Asia with freshwater bank sources. Based on dental microwear analysis, the diet of B. curtum was closest to those of selective browsers, consuming leaves, fruits, and dicotyledonous herbages that would have been common in humid forested environments. B. insigne would have been a counterpart to B. curtum since B. insigne was the largest species and likely lived in light forested habitats, where it would have had a more folivorous diet consisting mostly of leaves. B. lavocati, the last surviving species of the Bachitheriidae, likely lived in more open environments than preceding species based on the significant elongation of the metacarpals for locomotion, coinciding with the large transition from forested environments to more open environments by MP28, correlated with major climatic and faunal events. All species of Bachitherium seem, regardless of their preferred habitats, to be cursorial and thereby more adaptable for semi-open habitats as indicated by their elongated cannon bones relative to their metacarpal bones.

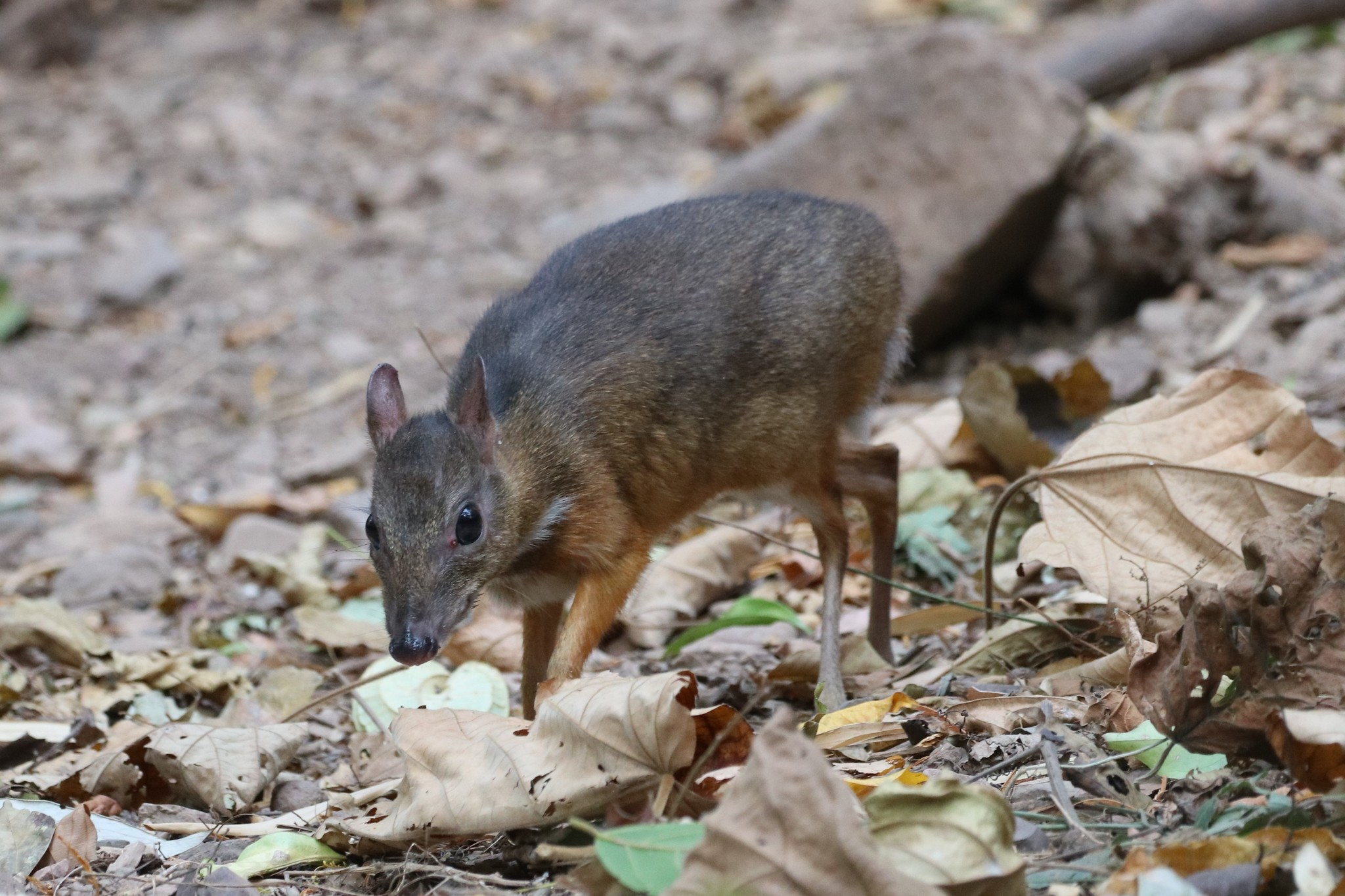
A lesser mouse-deer (Tragulus kanchil) foraging.

The primitive natures of modern chevrotains also provide clues to early ruminant behaviour. The modern water chevrotain (Hyemoschus aquaticus) lives in tropical African habitats including swampy habitats and riparian habitats. When alarmed, the species is reported to rush to the nearest river and submerge, swimming upstream, and coming to the surface beneath water banks or overhanging vegetation. Although not as often observed, this behaviour is also reported in Moschiola and Tragulus, which engage in aquatic escape behaviours from predators by running into a water source and swimming. They can swim with only the upper half of their heads out of the water and can even completely submerge, although the behaviours prove to be exhaustive for the small ruminants. In comparison, this behaviour is not as common in pecorans, supporting the hypothesis that the Tragulidae retains such rare escape behaviours because they diverged within the Ruminantia at an early stage. The oldest tragulid, known from the Krabi Basin of southern Thailand as Archaeotragulus, dates back to the late Eocene, further supporting the Tragulidae being the most basal extant ruminant family.

== Palaeoecology ==
=== Pre-Grande Coupure Europe ===
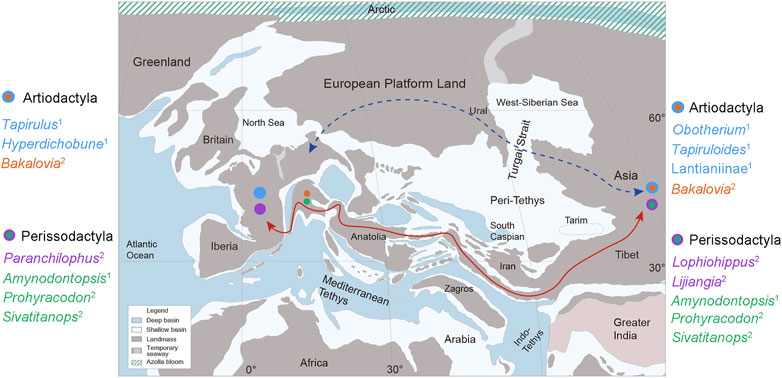
Palaeogeography of Europe and Asia during the middle Eocene with possible artiodactyl and perissodactyl dispersal routes.

For much of the Eocene, a hothouse climate with humid, tropical environments with consistently high precipitations prevailed. Modern mammalian orders including the Perissodactyla, Artiodactyla, and Primates (or the suborder Euprimates) appeared already by the early Eocene, diversifying rapidly and developing dentitions specialized for folivory. The omnivorous forms mostly either switched to folivorous diets or went extinct by the middle Eocene (47 - 37 Ma) along with the archaic "condylarths." By the late Eocene (approx. 37 - 33 Ma), most of the ungulate form dentitions shifted from bunodont cusps to cutting ridges (i.e. lophs) for folivorous diets.

Land-based connections to the north of the developing Atlantic Ocean were interrupted around 53 Ma, meaning that North America and Greenland were no longer well-connected to western Europe. From the early Eocene up until the Grande Coupure extinction event (56 Ma - 33.9 Ma), the western Eurasian continent was separated into three landmasses, the former two of which were isolated by seaways: western Europe (an archipelago), Balkanatolia, and eastern Eurasia (Balkanatolia was in between the Paratethys Sea of the north and the Neotethys Ocean of the south). The Holarctic mammalian faunas of western Europe were therefore mostly isolated from other continents including Greenland, Africa, and eastern Eurasia, allowing for endemism to occur within western Europe. The European mammals of the late Eocene (MP17 - MP20) were mostly descendants of endemic middle Eocene groups as a result.

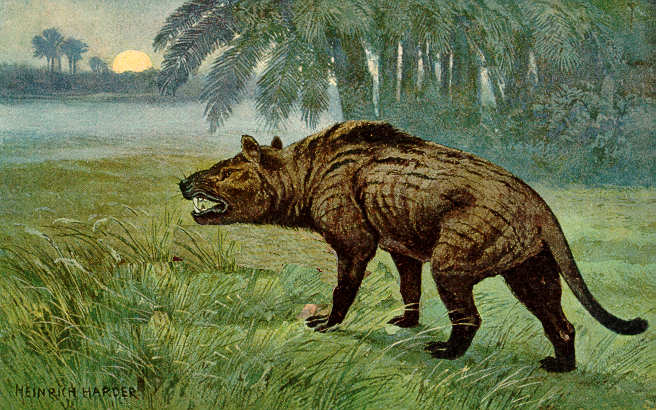
Old restoration of Hyaenodon in a subtropical environment. Hyaenodon appeared in Europe by the late Eocene (MP17a) and existed there for up to the earliest Miocene (MP30).

Although Paleogene mammals are incomplete in the fossil record in eastern Europe compared to western Europe, there is enough fossil evidence indicating which mammals likely coexisted with Bachitherium thraciensis, the first ruminant to appear in eastern Europe, in regions like modern-day Bulgaria during the middle-late Eocene. Fossil evidence indicates that the late Eocene mammals of eastern Europe during the Priabonian age include the palaeothere Plagiolophus, the anthracotheres Bakalovia and Prominatherium, the brontotheres Sivatitanops? and Brachydiastematerium, the paraceratheriid Forstercooperia, the hyracodont Prohyracodon, and the amynodonts Amynodon and Cadurcodon. The Muridae, Cricetidae, Erinaceidae, and the marsupial Peratherium are also typical Eocene faunas of typically Asian origins that are present in eastern Europe prior to the Grande Coupure, although the exact ages of the formations that they appeared in are not well-established due to the difficulties in estimating them in eastern European formations. These faunas contrast strongly with western Europe due to the stronger endemism in the western landmass and great difficulties for mammals of Asian affinities in crossing to the landmass prior to the latest Eocene-early Oligocene.

=== The Grande Coupure ===
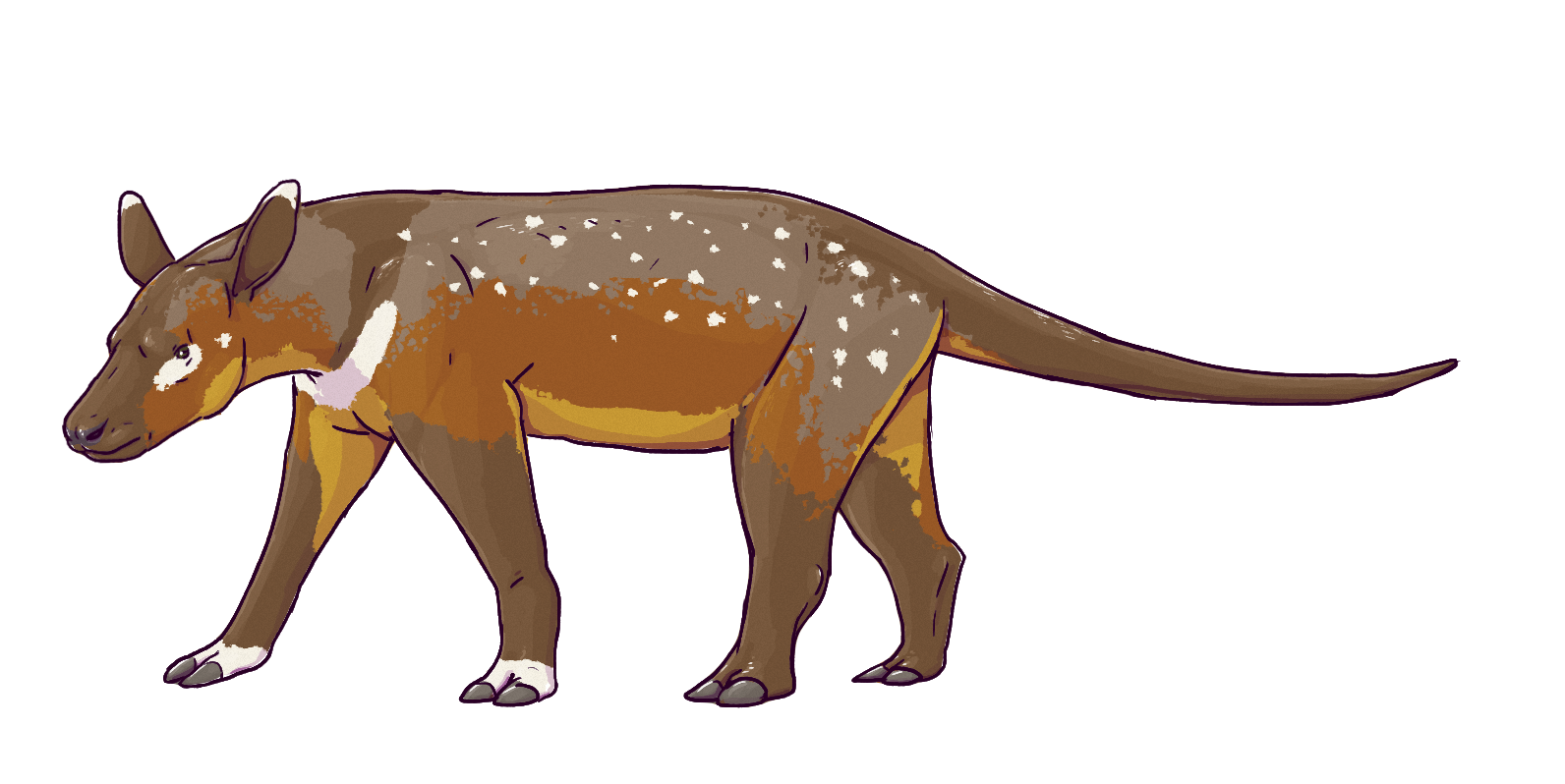
Anoplotherium, an iconic genus of the Western European endemic fauna from the late Eocene to the early Oligocene. It died out by the Eocene-Oligocene transition due to the Grande Coupure extinction event.

The Grande Coupure, translating in French to "the great break," is one of the largest extinction and faunal turnover events in the Cenozoic palaeontological record, occurring in Europe within MP20-MP21 as a result of climate forcing and other factors causing a 60% extinction rate of western European mammalian lineages while Asian faunal immigrants replaced them. The Grande Coupure is often marked by palaeontologists as part of the Eocene-Oligocene boundary as a result at 33.9 Ma, although some estimate that the event began 33.6-33.4 Ma. The event correlates directly with or after the Eocene-Oligocene transition, an abrupt shift from a greenhouse world characterizing much of the Paleogene to a coolhouse/icehouse world of the early Oligocene onwards. The massive drop in temperatures stems from the first major expansion of the Antarctic ice sheets that caused drastic pCO_{2} decreases and an estimated drop of ~70 m (230 ft) in sea level. Alexis Licht et al. suggested that the Grande Coupure could have possibly been synchronous with the Oi-1 glaciation (33.5 Ma), which records a decline in atmospheric CO_{2}, boosting the Antarctic glaciation that already started by the Eocene-Oligocene transition.

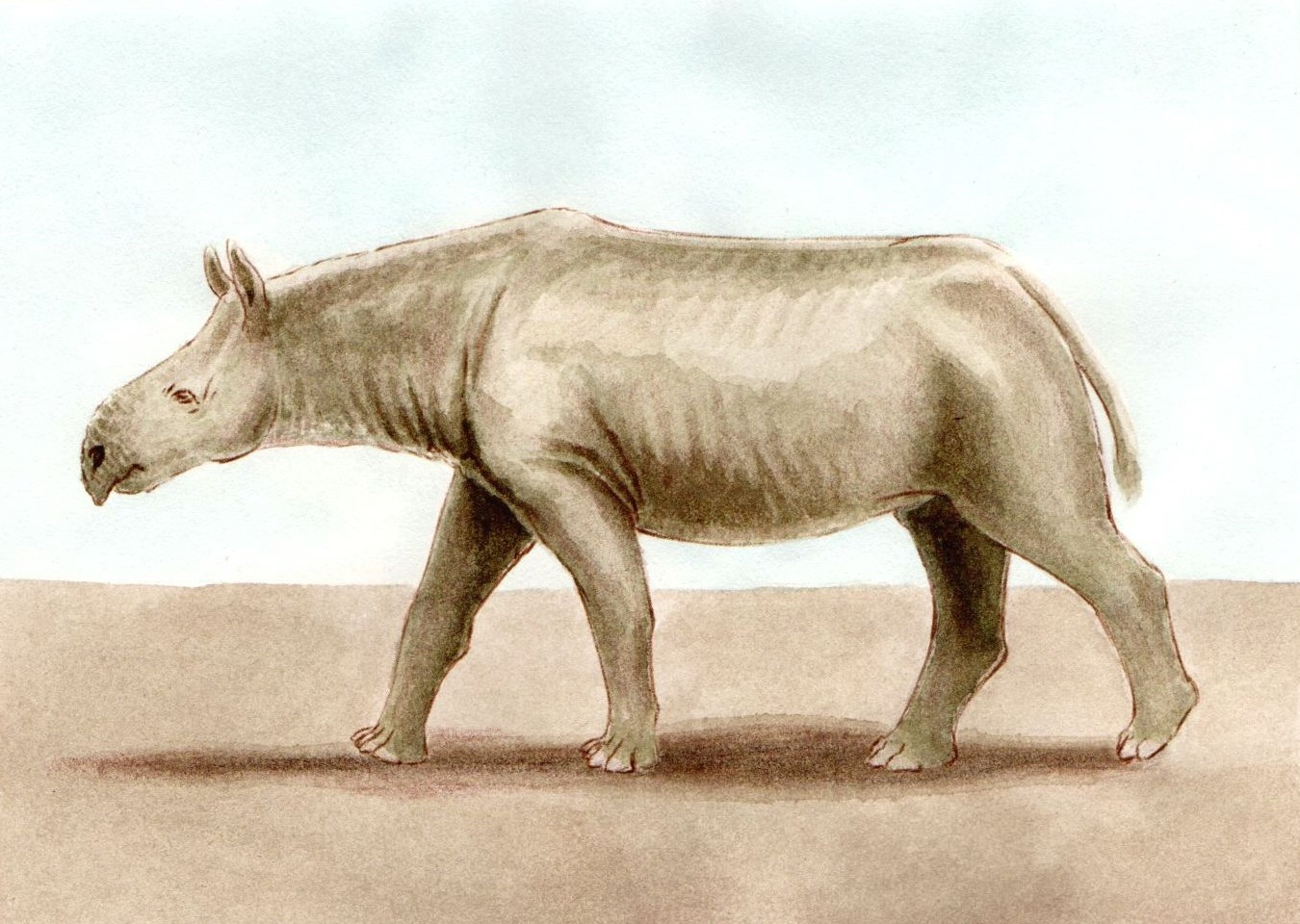
Ronzotherium, a rhinocerotid that appeared in Europe during the Grande Coupure extinction-faunal turnover event and lived there for most of the Oligocene.

The Eocene-Oligocene transition of western Europe, as a result of the global climatic conditions, is marked by a transition from tropical and subtropical forests to more open, temperate or mixed deciduous habitats with adaptations to increased seasonality. The extinction event also marks a coincident faunal turnover in western Europe, in which faunal immigrants from Asia disperse there as a result of the closing of seaways previously separating western Europe from the rest of Eurasia. The Grande Coupure also marks the first European appearances of the later anthracotheres, gelocids, lophiomerycids, and rhinocerotoids (rhinocerotids, eggysodonts, and amynodonts). Rodents (Eomyidae, Cricetidae, and Castoridae) as well as eulipotyphlans (Erinaceidae) were also Grande Coupure arrivals of Asian origins. Carnivorans representing the Amphicynodontidae, Nimravidae, Amphicyonidae, and Ursidae have all entered the European continent during the Grande Coupure, abruptly making carnivorans the dominant carnivorous group.

The causes of the abrupt extinctions are debated, with suggested causes being climatic and environmental deterioration following late Eocene-early Oligocene glaciations, intensified competition from Asian faunas resulting from seaways previously separating western Europe from other landmasses closing, or some combination of the two. Either way, the post-Grande Coupure faunas of Europe had few endemic representatives, the Asian faunal immigrants that were better-adapted for the Oligocene becoming the dominant faunal assemblages.

The site locality Detan of the Doupov Mountains of the region of Bohemia in the Czech Republic, dating to MP21 or MP22, indicates the co-existence of Bachitherium cf. curtum with the marsupial Amphiperatherium, rodents (Pseudocricetodon, Paracricetodon), gelocid Gelocus, lophiomerycid Lophiomeryx, cainothere Paroxacron, suoid Doliochoerus, entelodont Entelodon, anthracotheres Anthracotherium and Elomeryx, rhinocerotid Ronzotherium, ursid Cephalogale, amphicyonid Pseudocyonopsis, and hyaenodont Hyaenodon. The faunas of this locality are consistent enough with those representative of the post-Grande Coupure deposits.

=== Bachitherium Dispersal Event ===
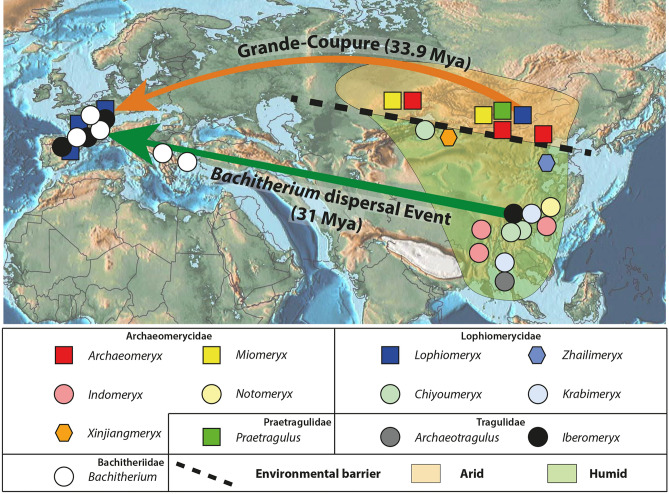
Palaeobiogeography of eastern Eurasian ruminants during the late Eocene-early Oligocene with dispersal routes to western Europe during the Grande Coupure (33.9 Ma) and Bachitherium Dispersal Event (31 Ma).

During the Grande Coupure, Bachitherium and associated rodents coexisting with it (Pseudocricetodon, Paracricetodon, Melissodontinae) were unable to fully disperse to western Europe (modern-day Spain, France, Germany, Belgium, and England) from eastern Europe because of deep water barriers resulting from the Northern Alpine water basin connecting to the Carpathian Basin and Greater Caucasus Basin, thus separating southeastern Europe from western Europe. It was not until ~31 Ma (ca. MP23) that the Paratethys Sea branch of the Tethys Ocean became shallower and eventually disappeared. The disappearance of the seaway barrier allowed Bachitherium and rodents associated with it to disperse from southeastern Europe into the western European region. The tragulid Iberomeryx, known first in the Eocene of eastern Asia, dispersed into southwestern Asia (modern-day Turkey and Georgia) and also arrived at western Europe where it took the same southern route as Bachitherium.

The Itardies locality of France is dated to MP23, after the Bachitherium Dispersal Event, and has fossil evidence of B. curtum and B. vireti. The two species were found in the same locality as the marsupial Amphiperatherium (multiple species), nyctitheriid Darbonetus, erinaceid Tetracus, bats, rodents (theridomyids, sciurids, eomyids, cricetids, murids, and glirids), hyaenodonts Hyaenodon and Thereutherium, amphicynodont Amphicynodon, enigmatic feliforms (Stenogale, Stenoplesictis, Palaeogale), nimravid Nimravus, palaeothere Plagiolophus, rhinocerotid Ronzotherium, anoplotheriid Diplobune, cainotheres Plesiomeryx and Caenomeryx, and the tragulid Iberomeryx.

=== Europe in the Oligocene ===
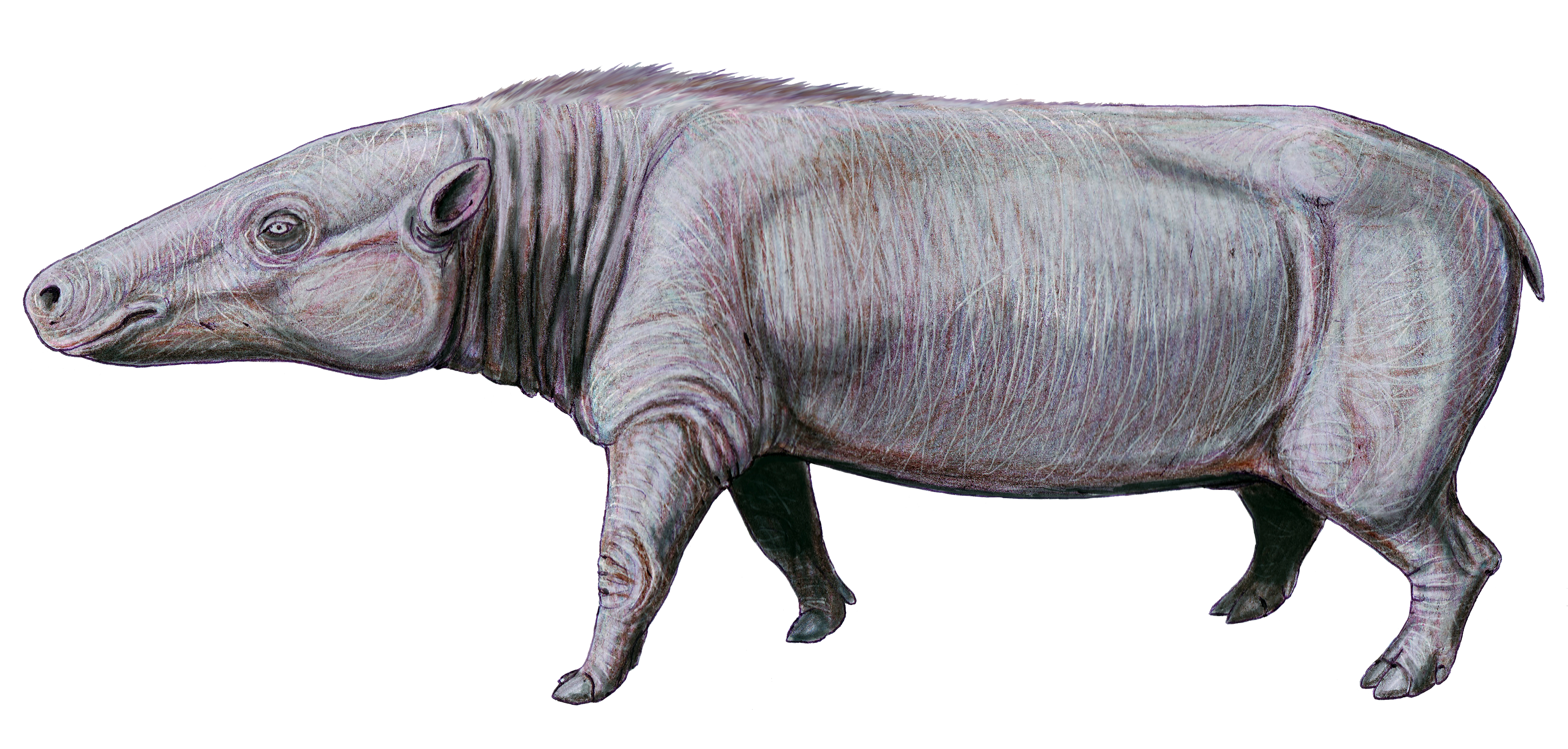
Restoration of Anthracotherium magnum. Anthracotheres, rhinocerotoids, and ruminants were the dominant assemblages of Eurasia in the Oligocene.

Although the Eocene-Oligocene transition marked long-term drastic cooling global climates, western Eurasia was still dominated by humid climates, albeit with dry winter seasons in the Oligocene. Europe during the Oligocene had environments largely adapted to winter-dry seasons and humid seasons that were composed of three separate vegetational belts by latitude, with temperate needleleaf-broadleaved or purely broadleaved deciduous forests aligning with the northernmost belt between 40°N and 50°N, the middle belt of warmth-adapted mixed mesophytic and evergreen broadleaved forests aligning between 40°N and 30°N, and the last belt containing tropical vegetation aligning below 30°N.

By MP24, a faunal turnover event occurred, likely caused by environmental changes resulting from the Oi-2 glaciation and European sea regressions. The extinction event resulted in the extinctions of the rhinocerotid Epiaceratherium and ruminants Gelocus and Iberomeryx. The two other ruminants Bachitherium and Lophiomeryx both survived the event and speciated along with all other rhinocerotoids and anthracotheres. MP24 also involves the first appearances of the stem pecorans Mosaicomeryx and Prodremotherium, anthracothere Paenanthracotherium, and rhinocerotid Molassitherium. Notably, B. curtum was able to cross through the turnover event.

The Le Garouillas locality in France, dating to MP25, contains two, possibly three, species of Bachitherium, namely B. curtum, B. guirounetensis, and B. sp. The locality has also recorded multiple nimravids (Quercylurus, Nimravus, Dinailurictis), the feliform Stenoplesictis, palaeothere Plagiolophus, rhinocerotoids (Ronzotherium, Eggysodon, Cadurcotherium), chalicothere Schizotherium, suoid Doliochoerus, dichobunid Metriotherium, cainothere Caenomeryx, anthracothere Anthracotherium, and the lophiomerycid Lophiomeryx. Notably, Schizotherium in Europe existed only in this locality, suggesting just a short period of existence there.

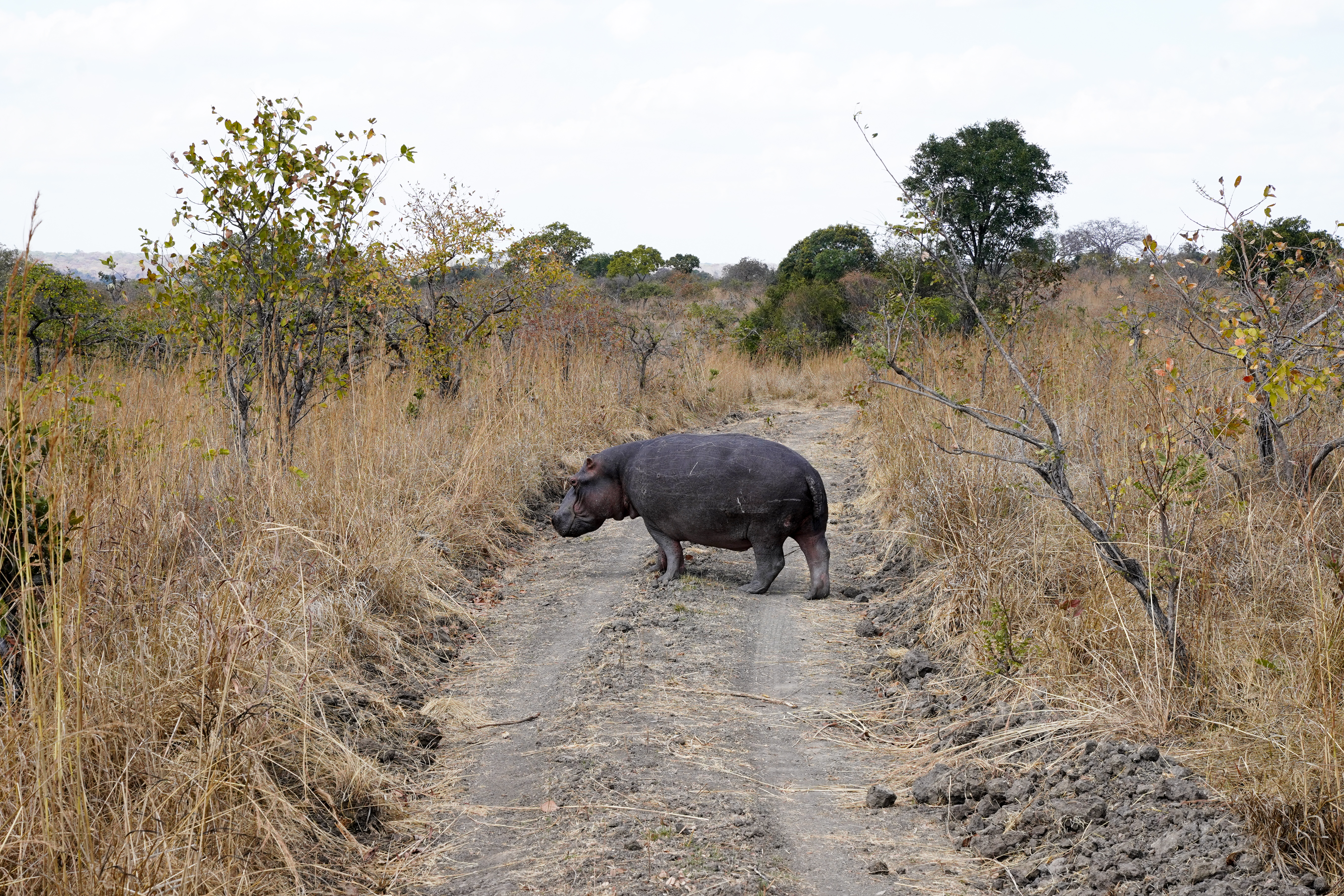
Africa today largely consists of tropical savannahs with dry conditions, making it slightly similar to Europe during the middle-late Oligocene.

MP25 (middle Oligocene) records the last appearances of the entelodont Entelodon, amynodont Cadurcotherium, palaeothere Plagiolophus, and all Paleogene European nimravids, the latter of which are suggested to have gone extinct by 28 Ma. These faunal changes brought an end to the dominance of feliforms in Europe in favor of caniforms (amphicyonids and ursids), the complete extinction of the palaeotheres, and the extirpations of the entelodonts and amynodonts from Europe, potentially correlating with increased aridity in Europe.

The faunas of MP26 were similar to preceding units, with B. curtum, B. insigne, and most other typical Oligocene European faunas, with additional amphicyonids (Cynelos, Brachycyon) making their first appearances within the continent. The faunas of this time suggest woodland-savannah environments with forested areas and tree-shrub savannahs.

B. curtum and B insigne, after long periods of existence in Europe, finally disappeared by the end of MP27, where they were replaced by B. lavocati by MP28. The speciation changes coincide in part with the Late Oligocene Warming, a period lasting ~26 to 24 Ma (MP26 and MP28), which caused a reversal of climates towards warmer surface temperatures similar to those observed in the late Eocene. This is evident in part by a 2 °C (36 °F) to 4 °C (39 °F) increase in marine temperature. Unlike its two predecessors, B. lavocati only existed for one unit, MP28. The French locality of Pech Desse, an MP28-dated location with B. lavocati, also has fossil remains of the lophiomerycid Lophiomeryx, anthracothere Paenanthracotherium, pecorans Prodremotherium and "Amphitragulus" quercyi, cainotheres Plesiomeryx and Caenomeryx, hyaenodont Hyaenodon, and the ursid Cyonarctos.

== Extinction ==
By the late Oligocene, B. lavocati was the last bachitheriid species to exist in Europe. Its near-exclusivity to the MP28 zonation unit means that the species was short-lived, existing for only ~300,000 years. The Late Oligocene Warming event, which marks large increases in surface temperatures, not only marked the final speciation of Bachitherium but eventually its extinction. In part, the event brought changes in vegetation towards more open habitats like savannahs that were adjusted to drier and more seasonal climates. Although postcranial remains of B. lavocati suggest that it was better-adapted towards open habitats compared to its predecessors, it may have been unable to adapt to further changes in vegetation.

MP28 marks a faunal turnover event known as the "Microbunodon Event", which occurred between 24.8 and 24 Ma and marks the appearances of the small anthracothere Microbunodon and pecorans of uncertain affinities: "Amphitragulus" quercyi, Dremotherium, and Babameryx, all of which were Asiatic immigrants. Additional carnivorans appear during this time as well, namely the ursids Phoberogale and Cyonarctos and the ailurid Amphictis. The immigrant pecorans were able to live in the arid and open habitats because they were better-adapted to mixed feeding diets and cursoriality compared to the European tragulines. The complete extinctions of Bachitherium, Lophiomeryx, and Prodremotherium could therefore also potentially be the result of competition with the "advanced" pecorans.

Other typical Oligocene faunas would eventually join Lophiomeryx and Bachitherium in the short but gradual extinction process as a result of the Mi-1 Glaciation event, an immediate event occurring after the Late Oligocene Warming that marked a reversal to colder climates and aridification from the latest Oligocene to the earliest Miocene (why aridification occurred in both events remains unknown, however). Ronzotherium and Paenanthracotherium became extinct by MP29 while Microbunodon, Anthracotherium, "Amphitragulus" quercyi, Babameryx, and Hyaenodon followed by MP30. The last Oligocene-spanning artiodactyls and perissodactyls Eggysodon and Elomeryx died out by MN1. The Paleogene ursids of the Cephalogalini tribe were replaced by similar hemicyonines of the Hemicyonini tribe by MN2, thus bringing the end of the post-Grande Coupure faunas. The tragulines were completely absent from Europe as a result of the extinctions of Bachitherium and Lophiomeryx since MP29 until the appearances of the Neogene tragulids Dorcatherium and Dorcabune by MN4.

== Palaeontological significance ==
=== Bachitherium cf. insigne exhibition ===
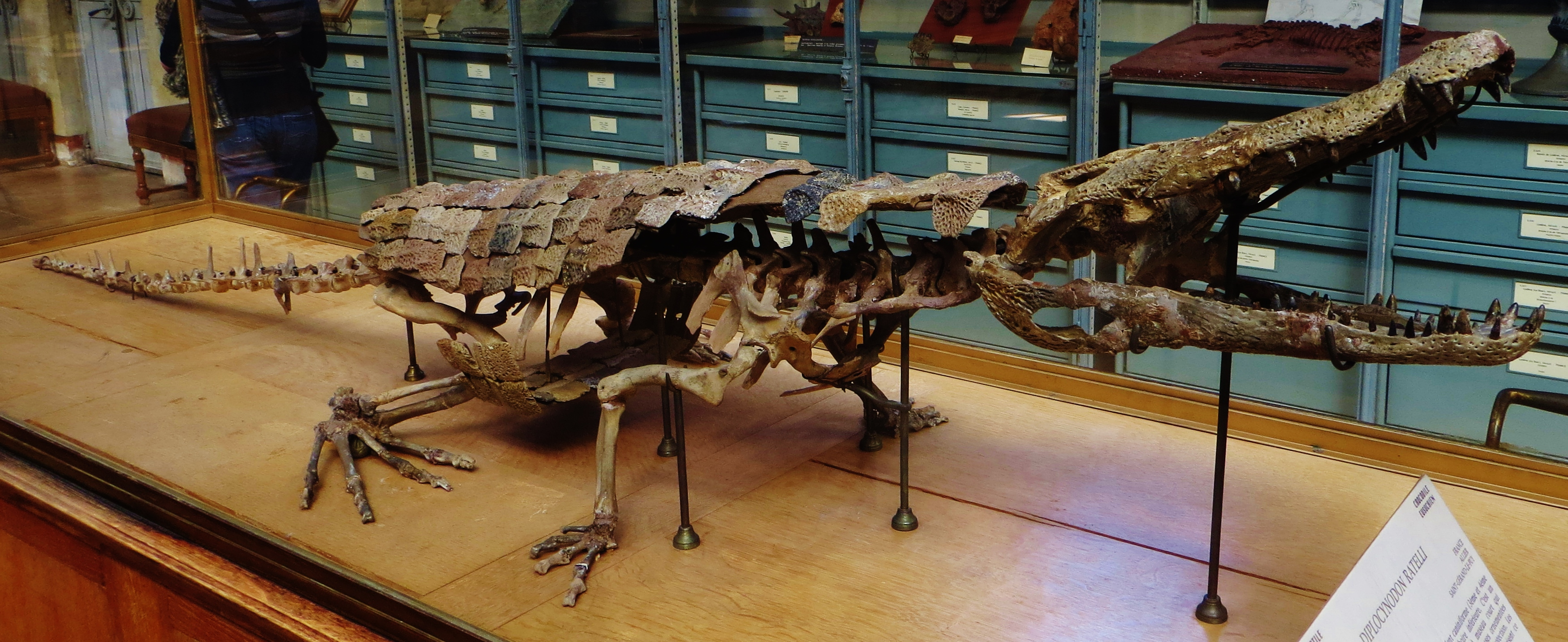
Diplocynodon ratelii skeleton, National Museum of Natural History, France. The skeleton was found in the same area as the B. cf. insigne skeleton, indicating co-existence by the early Oligocene.

The skeleton of Bachitherium cf. insigne was found in the commune of Céreste in the French region of Luberon, a palaeontological site for terrestrial communities dating to the early Oligocene that is considered a Konservat-Lagerstätte site for its well-preserved flora and fauna fossils. The site contains hundreds of species of fossil plants, fossil fish a skeletal remain of a ranid frog, a complete but currently undescribed shell of a turtle with associated skeletal remains, an almost complete skull and postcranial skeleton of the alligatoroid Diplocynodon rateli, fossil remains of birds that could be identified as trogons, hummingbirds, and passerines, and fossil insects. Mammal fossils are rare within the site, however, making the discovery of the only Bachitherium skeleton significant. It was first discovered by a private collector in 1981 within the locality of Pichovet. The specimen was sold to a German collector in 1984 who held on to it before selling it to the Luberon Regional Nature Park in 1991. The park management, intending to allow the skeleton to be displayed for public display and education, gave the ownership of the fossil to the Luberon UGGp Geology Museum. In 1995, the regional Pierre Martel Museum of Vachères, located in the village of Vachères, was renovated and was chosen to house the Bachitherium skeleton, where it is considered a significantly unique piece.

=== "Mon village, mon fossile" ===
Bachitherium is also a focus of further recent efforts within France to promote palaeontological heritage, including as a representation of the post-Grande Coupure faunas of the Quercy fossil record. More specifically, the Causses du Quercy Geopark's management sought to promote conservation of the Oligocene-aged phosphorite deposits in part by educating nearby inhabitants to understand the generally niche palaeontological heritage in their areas to become the locality's future guarantors. In 2021, the Geopark's management commissioned the sculptor Patrick Médéric to create seven sculptures of Eocene-Oligocene animals whose genus/species names or synonymized names derive from a particular village as mascots of the locations. B. guirounetensis was selected to represent the village of Bach in the program, which was known as "Mon village, mon fossile" ("My village, my fossil"). The other animals chosen to represent other areas were the chalicothere Schizotherium ("Limognitherium"), marsupial Peratherium, amphimerycid Pseudamphimeryx, tody Palaeotodus, and two bats of the genus Vaylatsia. The mayors of the villages approved of the commissioned statues to represent the locations. In addition to serving as palaeontological icons for village inhabitants, the sculptures are intended to interest visitors in the geological histories surrounding the areas.

The installation of the Bachitherium sculpture in front of the village's town hall was completed on November 12, 2022. By that time, the village mayor Patrick Valette, Causses du Quercy Geopark president Catherine Marlas, and Patrick Médéric held an inauguration there to celebrate its completion.
