= Mon village, mon fossile =

Sculpture set of prehistoric animals in France

- Artist: Patrick Médéric
- Year: 2021 - 2023
- Medium: Medium-format sculptures
- Dimensions: 80 m × 100 m × 200 m (260 ft × 330 ft × 660 ft)
- Weight: 100 kg (220 lb)
- Website: https://www.patrick-mederic.com/marches-publics

Mon village, mon fossile (English: My village, my fossil) is a set of seven statues of prehistoric animals from the Quercy fossil deposits that are located in seven villages in the different communes of France. The Causses de Quercy UNESCO Global Geopark commissioned the sculptor Patrick Médéric to work on the seven different sculptures, which represent six species total; the genera represented by the sculpture set are Bachitherium, Schizotherium, Peratherium, Pseudamphimeryx, Palaeotodus, and Vaylatsia. Made of rebar and steel metals, the statues were associated with different villages based on the localities that the individual species were named after with the intention of serving as local mascots and enhancing palaeontological heritage and pride by making local residents aware of the historical associations of their locations with palaeontology.

Médéric began the project in 2021 and worked on it until 2022, being initially inaugurated where the sculptures were created at the commune Bouziès where his art studio was. The sculptures were then installed into their respective communes in 2022 and 2023, where they received their own inaugurations.

== Description and history ==
Mon village, mon fossile (translating in English to "My village, my fossil") is a statue set of seven prehistoric animals from Quercy fossil deposits, dating back to the Palaeogene period (specifically the Eocene and Oligocene epochs), that were each implemented in seven different villages in France. The seven sculptures were created in a project by the Causses de Quercy UNESCO Global Geopark in collaboration with the municipal staff of the villages. Each animal representative was chosen based on the village location that they were found in, has explanatory labels describing them and the time that they lived in, and was placed strategically in different areas like "village squares, parking lots and churches". Their statuses as mascots for the villages allow them to be recognizable to the local residents, who typically would never have recognized the individual species. More specifically, each species representative has its scientific name derived from the locations of their respective villages, such as Bachitherium guirountensis in the commune of Bach. The prehistoric animal representatives of the villages have had their fossils discovered in the areas in much older times, thus obscuring the species themselves for most of the local residents. The statues are meant to expand palaeontological heritage and pride to the public perception within the local areas and have events organized around them.

There are a total of seven statues of the Mon village, mon fossile set in seven different French communes, representing six unique species (each of a different genus) and accounting for five mammal species and one bird species. While the placements of some species as mascots of certain villages are based on their species names, other placements have been based more on their genus names. The six species of the statue set are the ruminant Bachitherium guirountensis in Bach, perissodactyl "Limognitherium" (= Schizotherium) priscum in Limogne-en-Quercy, metatherian Peratherium lavergnense in Concots, artiodactyl Pseudamphimeryx salesmei in Larnagol, tody Palaeotodus escampiensis in Escamps, and the bat Vaylatsia cregolensis in Vaylats and Crégols (making Vaylatsia the only genus to be representative of two localities rather than just one). Of note is that the name "Limognitherium" is used in reference to the Limogne-en-Quercy locality despite "Schizotherium" taxonomically taking priority as the senior synonym and valid genus name. Additionally, rather than Larnagol, Pseudamphimeryx salesmei was named after a specific locality named "Salesmes", located within the heights of the commune. The name Peratherium lavergnense is derived from the district of Lavergne within Concots.

=== History ===
The Mon village, mon fossile project began in early 2021 and is one of several programs started by the geopark to educate local inhabitants about their locations' palaeontological heritages. The seven statues were all sculpted by the French artist and Bouziès resident Patrick Médéric, who was commissioned by the geopark. Certain statues had their proportional sizes changed from those of the animal species they represented, such as when one of Pseudamphimeryx, estimated to be about 20 cm (7.9 in) tall, was multiplied by five. According to Médéric, the seven sculptures each weighed 100 kg (220 lb) and measured 200 cm (79 in) long, 100 cm (39 in) wide, and 80 cm (31 in) high. He closely collaborated with local palaeontologists while constructing the sculptures. Also involved in the project were a selection committee of the represented municipalities and Maison des arts Georges et Claude Pompidou. Residents of the municipalities for the upcoming statues were able to visit his studio to view his progress on them. The sculptor used rebar and steel metals for the statues and assembled the works via welding them. It took nine months for Médéric to complete his commissions, the set being inaugurated beginning in August 2022 at Bouziès with geopark president Catherine Marlas and the town's mayor present for the event. The total cost of the production of the sculpture set was €76,623.86, with each of the seven sculptures costing €10,000. The explanatory labels costed €4,141 and the engineering work €2,482.86. Additional financing plans for the parks costed about €36,780 total.

Afterward the initial inauguration at Bouziès, the statues were then to be installed within their representative locations. The sculpture of Palaeotodus in the village of Escamps was inaugurated on 24 September 2022, with Marlas and Médéric attending. On 2 November 2022, the "Limognitherium" sculpture was inaugurated at a parking lot at the centre of the village at Limogne-en-Quercy, with Catherine Marlas, the village mayor Jean-Claude Vialette, and several other officials attending. Retired geologist Thierry Pélissier, who was the former curator of a nature reserve called "La Réserve naturelle d'intérêt géologique du Lot", gave a speech to explain what Schizotherium was; at the event, Marlas gave him a gift on behalf of the Causses de Quercy UNESCO Global Geopark. The Bachitherium statue was inaugurated on the main road of Bach on the opposite side of the town hall on 12 November 2022. Among the people present at the public ceremony were Patrick Médéric, Catherine Marlas, the village mayor Patrick Valette, and numerous local officials. The Pseudamphimeryx statue at Laragnol was inaugurated on 18 March 2023 with several local park officials and politicians present. A bike riding event for the seven sculptures from Concots to the six other villages was held on 8 October 2022.
