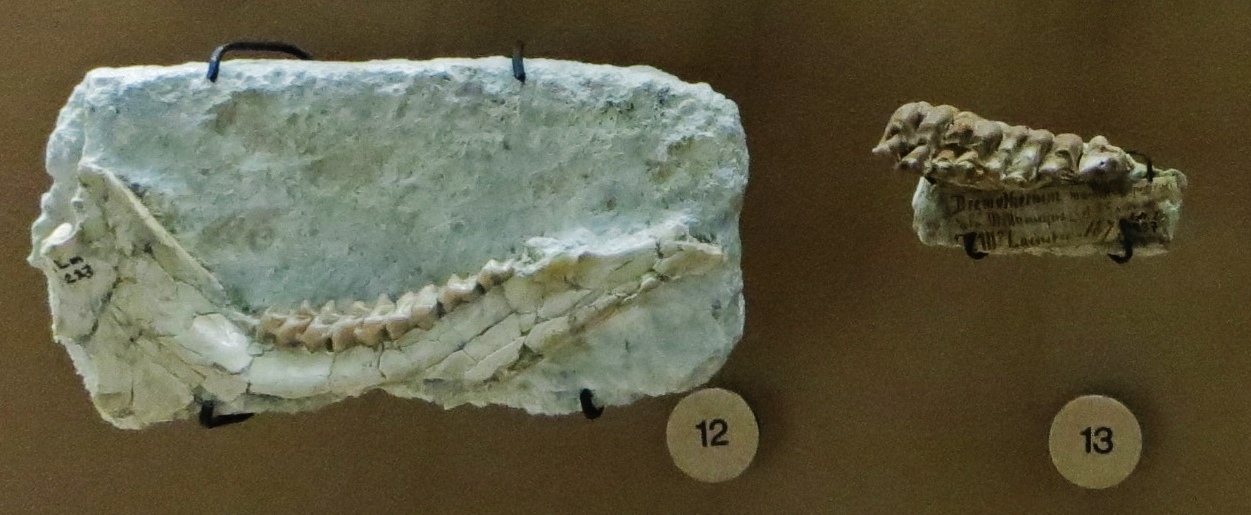
- Mandible and upper teeth of Dremotherium

Scientific classification
- Kingdom: Animalia
- Phylum: Chordata
- Class: Mammalia
- Order: Artiodactyla
- Family: Moschidae
- Genus: †Dremotherium; Geoffroy, 1833

Type species
- †D. feignouxi

Other species
- †D. guthi; †D. quercyi; †D. cetinensis

= Dremotherium =

Dremotherium Temporal range: Late Oligocene to Early Miocene ~24–20 Ma

Genus of Oligocene-Miocene musk deer

Dremotherium is an extinct genus of musk deer that lived from the late Oligocene to the early Miocene. Four species have been described based on fossils found across the Holarctic realm, specifically France, Germany, Spain and Mongolia. Numerous cranial remains and parts of the postcranial skeleton of Dremotherium have been found.

== Description ==
In life, Dremotherium would have resembled extant musk deer of the genus Moschus, possessing elongated upper canine teeth and lacking horns. It was a small, long-legged ruminant with a long snout. The elongated canines had open roots (indicating continuous growth) and were embedded deep in the skull and maxilla along the border of the nasal bones, extending almost to the orbits. The orbital cavity was located in the center of the skull, and it had a single lacrimal foramen, with well-developed lacrimal pits positioned anterior to the orbits. The teeth of Dremotherium were quite evolved, with the first lower premolar being absent. The cervical vertebrae were elongated, the basioccipital region was extended, and the occipital region was especially tall.

== Classification ==
Dremotherium was first described by Étienne Geoffroy Saint-Hilaire in 1833, based on fossil remains found in Early Miocene deposits at Saint-Gérand-le-Puy, France. The type species is D. feignouxi. Other species attributed to this genus include D. guthi and D. quercyi from the Late Oligocene, discovered in France and Germany as well as in Mongolia, in addition to D. cetinensis from the Early Miocene of Spain. D. quercyi is sometimes assigned to the related genus Amphitragulus.

D. cetinensis appears to be the most derived species of the genus, having evolved specialized hypsodont dentition.

Dremotherium and its close relatives (such as Micromeryx) are part of an evolutionary radiation of primitive moschids, whose only extant relatives are the musk deer. The genus Dremotherium has often been confused with Amphitragulus, and in some collections, cranial material has been attributed to the latter while postcranial material has been assigned to the former. However, the two genera appear to be distinct. Dremotherium had a different cranial morphology, with a much more elongated snout, whereas Amphitragulus possessed certain traits reminiscent of the family Palaeomerycidae, to which it may belong.

== Palaeoecology ==
Dremotherium coexisted with various herbivores such as the rhinoceros Mesaceratherium and the anthracotheriid Microbunodon. Dental microwear analyses of Dremotherium and related genera from the Late Oligocene deposits of La Milloque, France provide evidence of the species having evolved different diets. The larger D. guthi was a grazer that likely preferred open areas where grass was more plentiful, which would represent the oldest known evidence of brachydont ruminants grazing. The environment at La Milloque was likely a mixed habitat of forests and more open areas akin to grasslands. The dental wear of the smaller species, D. quercyi, was similar to that of the extant harnessed bushbuck, suggesting that it lived in more forested areas and fed on leaves and occasionally fruits.

The Miocene species D. feignouxi had an elongated neck, which, combined with the shape of its occipital and basioccipital regions, suggests that it may have stood on its hind legs to browse from tall trees, similar to the modern gerenuk. D. cetinensis, on the other hand, developed a dentition with hypsodont molars similar to those of certain species of deer, an adaptation indicative of a diet of tough vegetation.
