= Nalameryx =

Nalameryx Temporal range: Middle Oligocene

Scientific classification
- Kingdom: Animalia
- Phylum: Chordata
- Class: Mammalia
- Order: Artiodactyla
- Family: Tragulidae
- Genus: †Nalameryx; Métais et al., 2009

Species
- N. savagei Nanda & Sahni, 1990 (type); N. sulaimani Métais et al., 2009

Synonyms
- Iberomeryx savagei

Extinct genus of mammals

Nalameryx is an extinct genus of tragulid which lived in Kargil Formation of India and in Chitarwata Formation of Pakistan during Oligocene. and It was first named by Grégoire Métais, Jean-Loup Welcomme and Stéphane Ducrocq in 2009 and the type species is Nalameryx savagei. Nalameryx savagei is one of the rare mammals found during the Oligocene. Five dental remains composed the originally found material, described in 1990.

The first phylogenetic hypothesis proposed Nalameryx to be closely related to the basal ruminant Lophiomerycidae. The description of new specimens from the type bed K/7b from the Kargil Formation (late Oligocene, India), led to a reinterpretation of the phylogenetic position of Nalameryx and of the early evolutionary history of the Tragulidae. Based on the phylogenetic hypothesis, Nalameryx is nested within the living Tragulidae, making it one of the oldest known tragulid.
