= Thrace Basin =

Sedimentary basin in northern Turkey

The Thrace Basin is the largest and thickest Cenozoic sedimentary basin in Turkey. Most of the basin lies in the European side of the country, northwest of Istanbul, with portions extending into Greece and Bulgaria. It is triangular shaped, trends WNW-ESE and was formed in late Middle Eocene to latest Oligocene times. The basin is the location of gas and oil wells.

== Structure ==
About 9,000 meters of Eocene-Miocene marine clastics and continental sediments were deposited. Several basement faults were reactivated and underwent strike-slip motion in late Miocene times where the North Anatolian Fault bounds the southern part of the basin. The Cenozoic sedimentary succession, overlying Paleozoic to Mesozoic metamorphic basement, comprises interbedded fine to coarse grained clastics from a variety of depositional environments, turbidite, muddy carbonates with local reef developments, river channels and tuffs.

== Reserves ==
More than 600 wells have been drilled; 14 gas and four oil fields were discovered and all of them are producing. Main gas productions zones are between Eocene- Oligocene deposits; Hamitabat (turbiditic sandstones), Ceylan (tuffs), Sogucak (reefal limestone), and Osmancik (deltaic sandstone) formations. Shales of Hamitabat and Mezardere formations have good source potentials.
