= Andegameryx =

Andegameryx Temporal range: Early Miocene

Scientific classification
- Kingdom: Animalia
- Phylum: Chordata
- Class: Mammalia
- Order: Artiodactyla
- Infraorder: Pecora
- Genus: †Andegameryx; Ginsburg (1971)

Extinct genus of mammals

Andegameryx is an extinct genus of artiodactyl belonging to the infraorder Pecora, endemic to Europe during the Miocene, living 22.4—20 Ma, existing for approximately 2.4 million years.

Andegameryx were primitive and ancient ruminants, resembling small deer or musk deer, although they were more closely related to modern chevrotains. Its diet is stated to be that of a frugivore. The only known fossil was found in Zaragoza, Spain.

== Taxonomy ==
Andegameryx was named by Ginsburg (1971).
