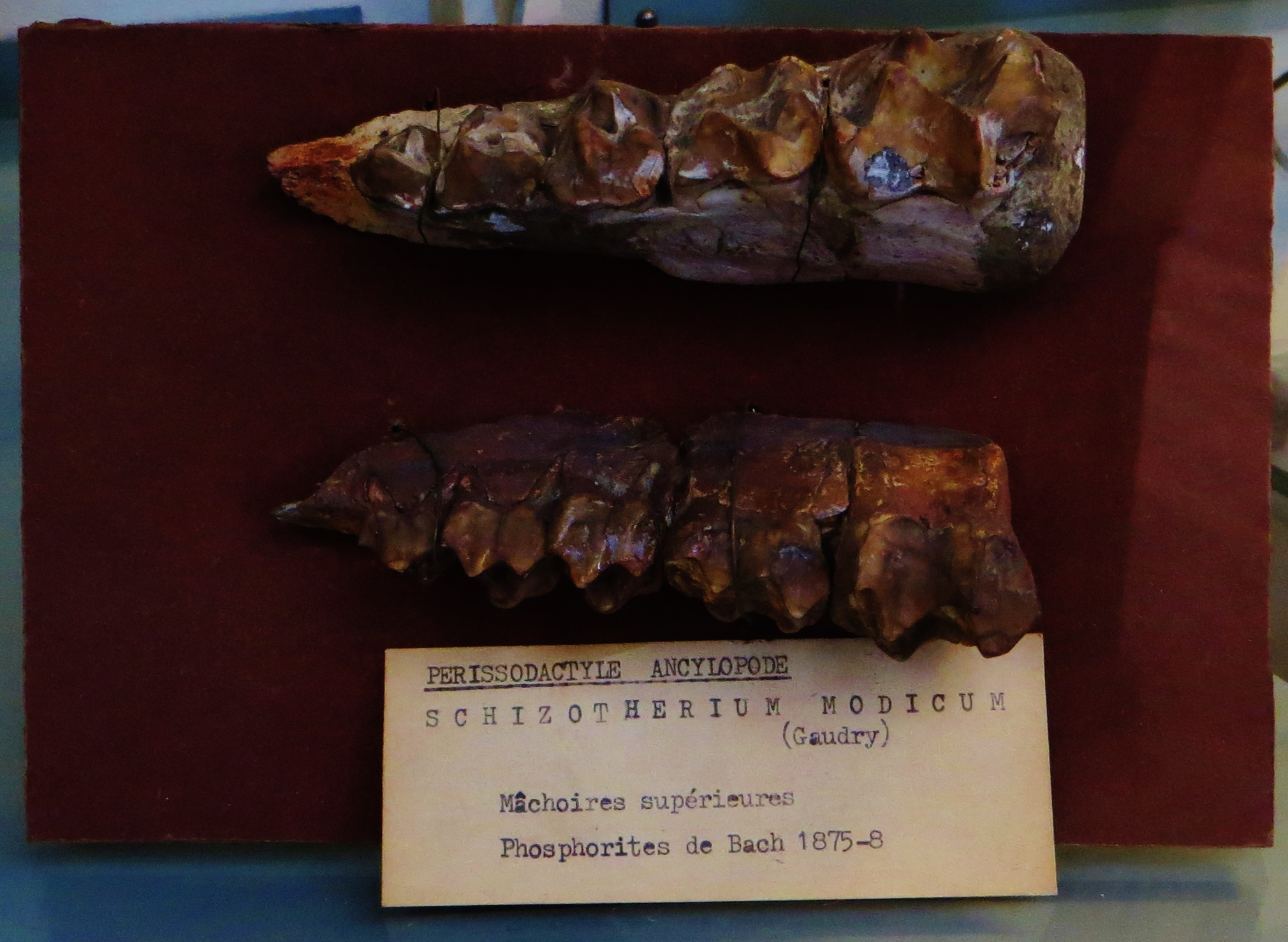
- S. priscum jaws, National Museum of Natural History, France

Scientific classification
- Kingdom: Animalia
- Phylum: Chordata
- Class: Mammalia
- Order: Perissodactyla
- Family: †Chalicotheriidae
- Subfamily: †Schizotheriinae
- Genus: †Schizotherium; Gervais, 1876

Type species
- †Schizotherium priscum Gervais, 1876

Other species
- †S. turgaicum Borissiak, 1920; †S. avitum Matthew and Granger, 1923; †S.chucuae Gabunia, 1951; †S. ordosium Hu, 1959; †S. nabanensis Zhang, 1976

Synonyms
- Limognitherium Gervais, 1880

= Schizotherium =

Schizotherium Temporal range: Oligocene

Extinct genus of mammals

Schizotherium is an extinct genus of schizotheriine chalicothere known from the Oligocene of Europe and Asia.

'Schizotherium modicum' - Mandibule - Musée Victor Brun Montauban, France
