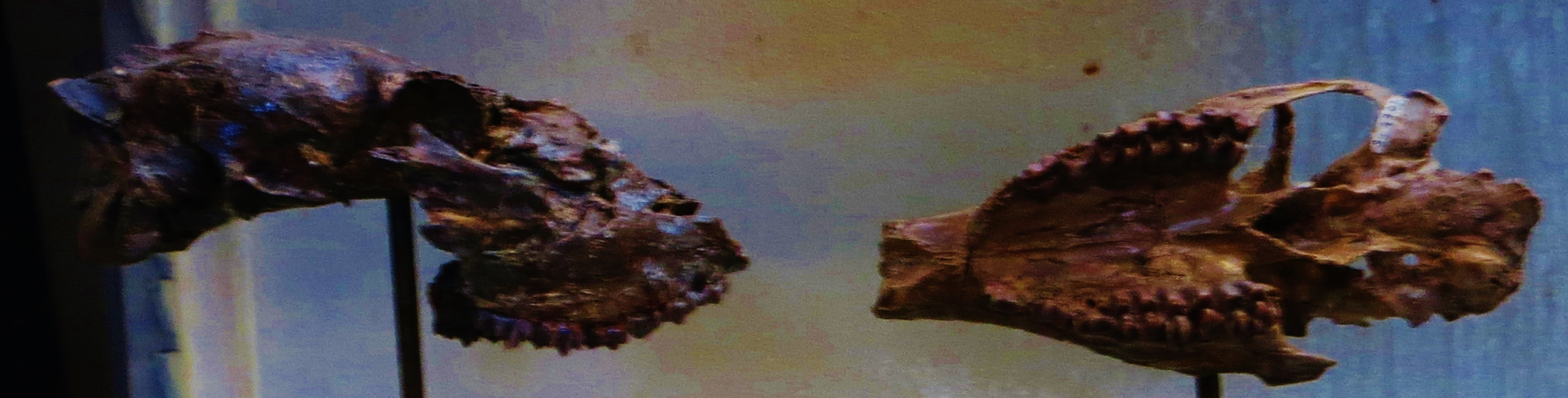
- Skulls of A. lemanensis, Museum Histoire Naturelle, Paris

Scientific classification
- Domain: Eukaryota
- Kingdom: Animalia
- Phylum: Chordata
- Class: Mammalia
- Order: Artiodactyla
- Infraorder: Pecora
- Genus: †Amphitragulus; Pomel, 1847

= Amphitragulus =

Amphitragulus Temporal range: Late Oligocene to Early Miocene

Extinct genus of mammals

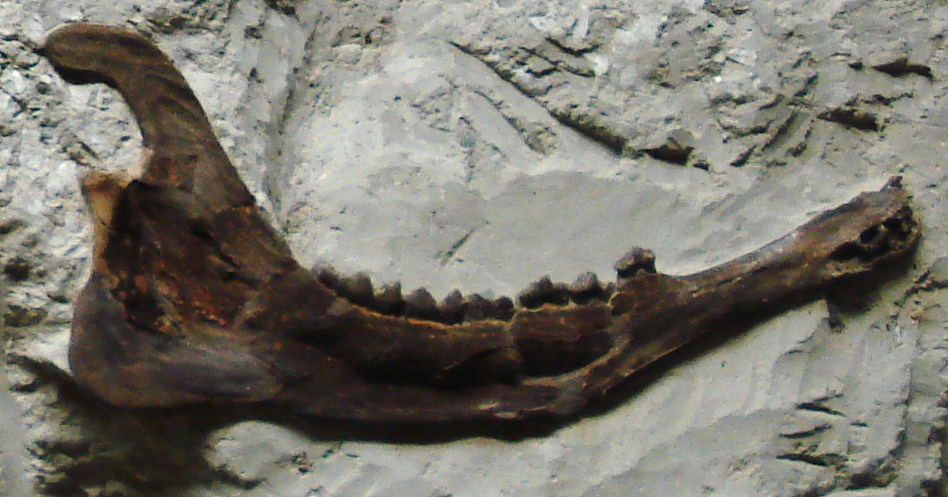
Jaw, Staatliches Museum für Naturkunde Stuttgart

Amphitragulus is an extinct genus of Artiodactyla, endemic to Europe during the early Miocene. It has been found in Aragon (Spain), Ronheim (Germany), Sardinia (Italy), France and Kazakhstan and range from 33 - 15.97 million years old.
