= Iberomeryx =

Iberomeryx Temporal range: Eocene–Oligocene

Scientific classification
- Kingdom: Animalia
- Phylum: Chordata
- Class: Mammalia
- Order: Artiodactyla
- Family: Tragulidae
- Genus: †Iberomeryx; Gabunia, 1964

Type species
- Iberomeryx parvus Gabunia, 1964

Other species
- Iberomeryx miaoi Mennecart et al., 2021; Iberomeryx minor Filhol, 1882

Extinct genus of tragulid

Iberomeryx is an extinct genus of tragulid that lived in Europe, Balkanatolia, and East Asia during the Eocene and Oligocene epochs.

Iberomeryx minor was a selective browser that would have fed on fruits and dicot leaves, although may have occasionally consumed animal matter on rare occasions and not have been exclusively herbivorous.
