= Jarman–Bell principle =

Ecological concept linking an herbivore's diet and size

The Jarman–Bell principle is a concept in ecology that the food quality of a herbivore's intake decreases as the size of the herbivore increases, but the amount of such food increases to counteract the low quality foods. It operates by observing the allometric (non- linear scaling) properties of herbivores. The principle was coined by P.J Jarman (1968.) and R.H.V Bell (1971).

Large herbivores can subsist on low quality food. Their gut size is larger than smaller herbivores. The increased size allows for better digestive efficiency, and thus allow viable consumption of low quality food. Small herbivores require more energy per unit of body mass compared to large herbivores. A smaller size, thus smaller gut size and lower efficiency, imply that these animals need to select high quality food to function. Their small gut limits the amount of space for food, so they eat low quantities of high quality diet. Some animals practice coprophagy, where they ingest fecal matter to recycle untapped/undigested nutrients.

However, the Jarman–Bell principle is not without exception. Small herbivorous members of mammals, birds and reptiles were observed to be inconsistent with the trend of small body mass being linked with high-quality food. There have also been disputes over the mechanism behind the Jarman–Bell principle; that larger body sizes does not increase digestive efficiency.

The implications of larger herbivores ably subsisting on poor quality food compared to smaller herbivores mean that the Jarman–Bell principle may contribute evidence for Cope's rule. Furthermore, the Jarman–Bell principle is also important by providing evidence for the ecological framework of "resource partitioning, competition, habitat use and species packing in environments" and has been applied in several studies.

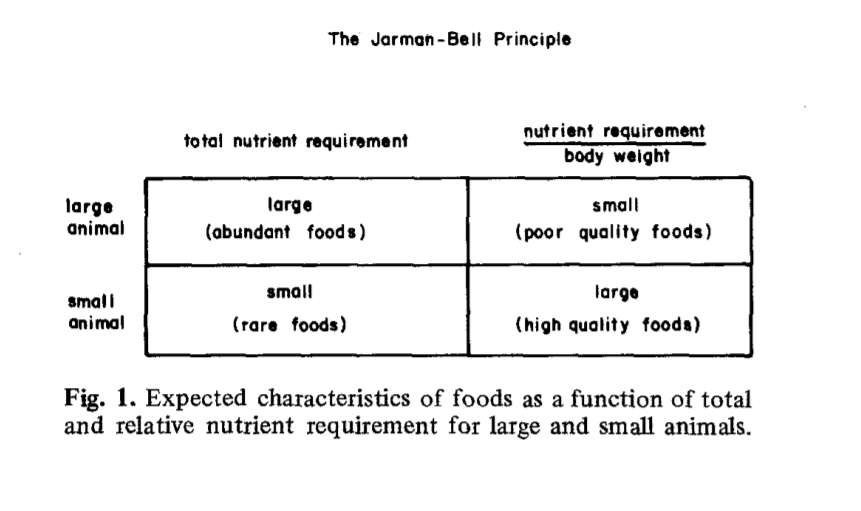
Expected characteristics in large and small animals tabulated according to the Jarman- Bell principle. Image by Steven J. C. Gaulin.

== Links with allometry ==
Allometry refers to the non-linear scaling factor of one variable with respect to another. The relationship between such variables is expressed as a power law, where the exponent is a value not equal to 1 (thereby implying a non-linear relationship).

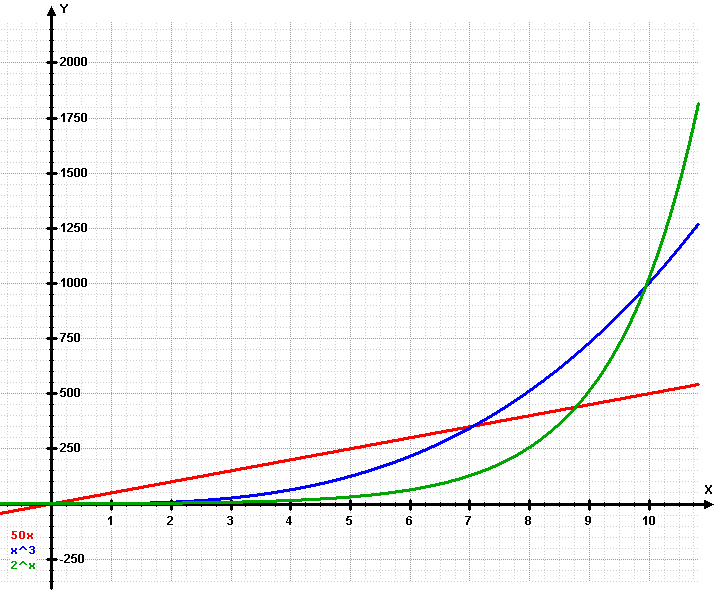
Assuming conventional (x, y) axis,Red line: Straight, imply linear relationship between (x) and (y) axis. Blue and green: Curved, imply non-linear relationship or a logarithmic relationship.

Allometric relationships can be mathematically expressed as follow:

$y = aBM^b, b \neq 1$ (BM = body mass)

=== Kleiber's law ===
Kleiber's law describes how larger animals use less energy relative to small animals. Max Kleiber developed a formula that estimates this phenomenon (the exact values are not always consistent).

$MR = 70*W^{0.75}$ Where MR = metabolic rate (kcal/day), W = weight/body mass (Kg)

Gut capacity scales linearly with body size (gut capacity = BM^{1.0}) but maintenance metabolism (energy required to maintain homeostasis) scales fractionally ( = BM^{0.75}). Both of these factors are linked through the MR/GC (metabolic requirement to gut capacity ratio). If body mass increases, then the observed ratio demonstrates how large bodies display a lower MR/GC ratio relative to a small body. That is, smaller herbivores require more metabolic energy per unit of body mass than a large one.

=== Retention time ===
The allometric scaling of retention time (the time that food remains inside the digestive system) with respect to body mass:

$T_r = 7.67*D*W^{0.346}$ Where T_{r} = retention time (hours), D = digestibility of the food, W = weight/body mass (Kg).

This formula was refined from a previous iteration because the previous formula took into account the entire gut, rather than focusing on the fermentation site where cellulose (the fibrous substance) is broken down.

== Explanation ==
=== Food intake ===
The energy gained food depends on the rate of digestion, retention time and the digestible content of the food.

As herbivores, food intake is achieved through three main steps: ingestion, digestion, and absorption.

Plant- based food is hard to digest and is done so with the help of symbiotic microbes in the gut of the herbivore. When food is passed through the digestive system (including multiple stomach chambers), it breaks down further through symbiotic microbes at fermentation site(s).

There exists different types of stomach plans:

1. Ruminants: 4 chambered stomach animals with fermentation occurring in the rumen (first stomach).
2. Pseudoruminants: ruminants but with 3 chambered stomach
3. Monogastric: one stomach, but fermentation can occur in multiple places depending on the animal. Places include the foregut, colon, caecum and hindgut.

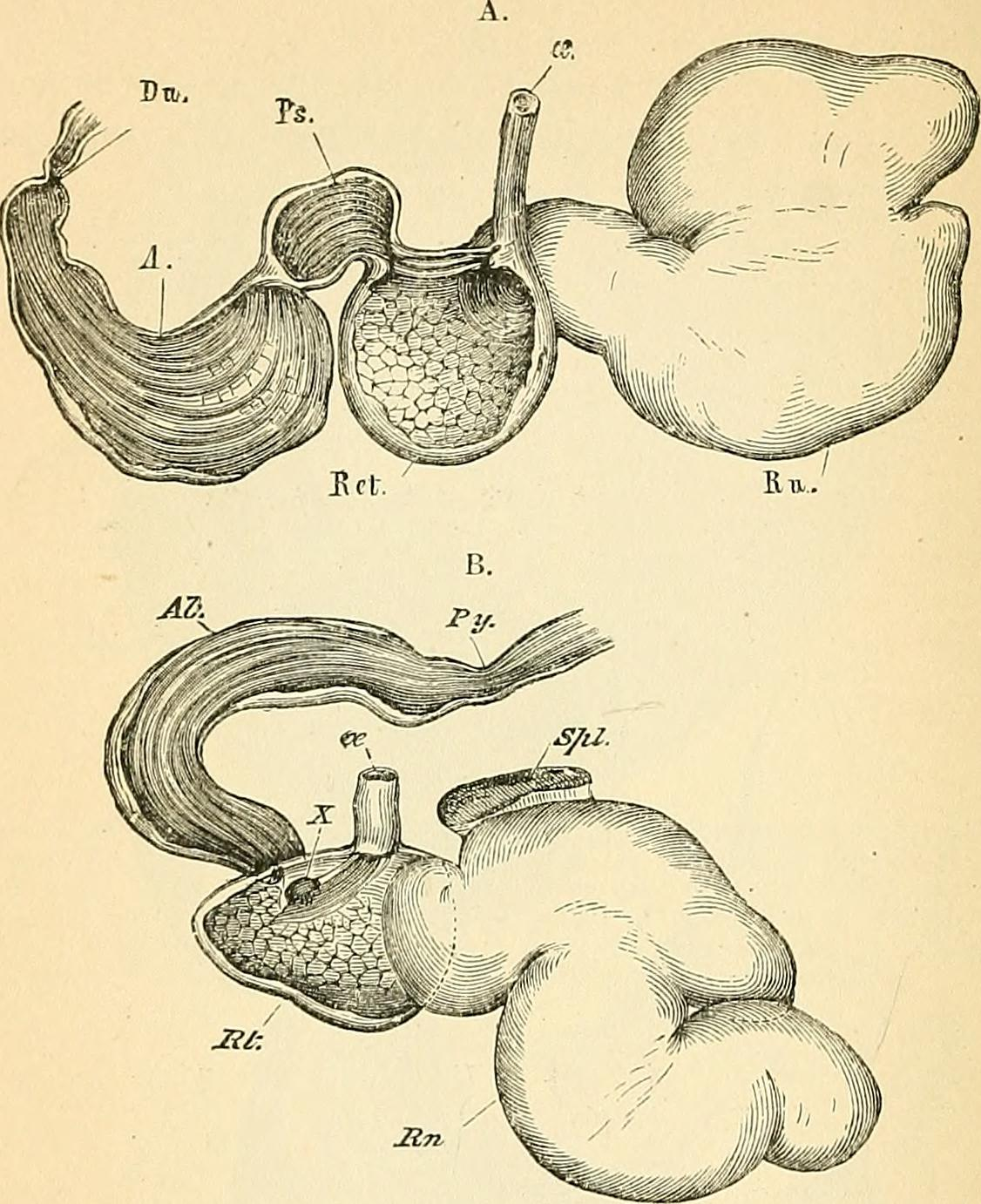
Top image (A): stomach of a sheep. Bottom image (B): stomach of a musk-deer | Both herbivores with the presence of multiple chambered stomachs, implying the presence of a rumen.

In order, the stomach plans represent the general level of efficiency when digesting plant-based food; ruminants are better compared to pseudoruminants and monogastrics. The development of the rumen not only allows a site for fermentation but also decrease the food digestion (increase retention time). However, a body mass ranging from 600 to 1200 kg is enough to cause sufficient digestion regardless of stomach plan.

=== Link to the Jarman–Bell principle ===
The Jarman–Bell Principle implies that the food quality a herbivore consumes is inversely proportional to the size of the herbivore, but the quantity of such food is proportional. The principle relies on the allometric (non-linear) scaling of size and energy requirement.

The metabolic rate per unit of body mass of large animals is slow enough to subside on a consistent flow of low-quality food. However, in small animals, the rate is higher and they cannot draw sufficient energy from low-quality food to live on.

The length of the digestive tract scales proportionally to the size of the animal. A longer digestive tract allows for more retention time and hence increases the efficiency of digestion and absorption.

==== Larger body mass ====
Poorer quality food selects animals to grow larger in size, and hence develop an increased digestive efficiency compared to smaller animals. Larger sized animals have a larger/longer digestive tract, allowing for more quantities of low quality food to be processed (retention time). Although herbivores can consume high quality food, the relative abundance of low quality food and other ecological factors such as resource competition and predator presence influence foraging behavior of the animal to primarily consume low quality food. Other factors include the size of the mouth constraining the selective ability of foraging, and the absolute energy large animals require compared to small (though smaller animals require higher energy per unit body mass).

==== Smaller body mass ====
Smaller animals have a limited digestive tract relative to larger animals. As such, they have a shorter retention time of food and cannot digest and absorb food to the same degree as larger animals. To counteract this disadvantage, high-quality food is selected, with quantity being limited by the animals gut size. Another method to counteract this is to practice coprophagy, where re-ingestion of fecal matter recycles untapped/undigested nutrients.

However, there are also reports of larger animals, including primates and horses (under dietary restrictions), practicing coprophagy.

Through the extra flexibility of subsisting on low-quality food, the Jarman–Bell Principle suggests an evolutionary advantage of larger animals and hence provides evidence for Cope's rule.

Schematic diagram of a monogastric animal (Homo sapiens). The cecum is highlighted in orange. In herbivores, the cecum is enlarged.

=== Exceptions ===
The Jarman–Bell Principle has some notable exceptions. Small herbivorous members of class Mammalia, Aves and Reptilia were observed to be inconsistent with the trend of small body mass being linked with high quality food. This discrepancy could be due to ecological factors which apply pressure and encourage an adaptive approach to the given environment, rather than taking on an optimal form of digestive physiology.

Small rodents subjected to low quality diet were observed to increase food intake and increase the size of their cecum and intestine, counteracting their low quality diet by allowing viable consumption of such food and hence refuting the link between diet quality and body size.

== Refuting the mechanism of the Jarman–Bell principle ==
Although the pattern of low food quality and body size appears consistent across multiple species, the explanation behind the principle (bigger size allowed better digestion via more retention time) has been disputed.

M. Clauss et al. argues that retention time is not proportional to body mass above 500 grams. That is, smaller species (that are above 500 grams but not too large) have been observed to rival larger species in their mean retention time.

Retention time being proportional to food intake was only observed in non-ruminant animals, not ruminants. Clauss et al. suggests that this is due to the diverse adaptations that support the rumen such that the digestive efficiency of ruminants remain consistent and independent of body size and food intake.

== Applications and examples ==
In addition to providing evidence for ecological frameworks such as "resource partitioning, competition, habitat use and species packing in environment" and Cope's rule, the Jarman–Bell Principle has been applied to model primate behaviours and explain sexual segregation in ungulates.

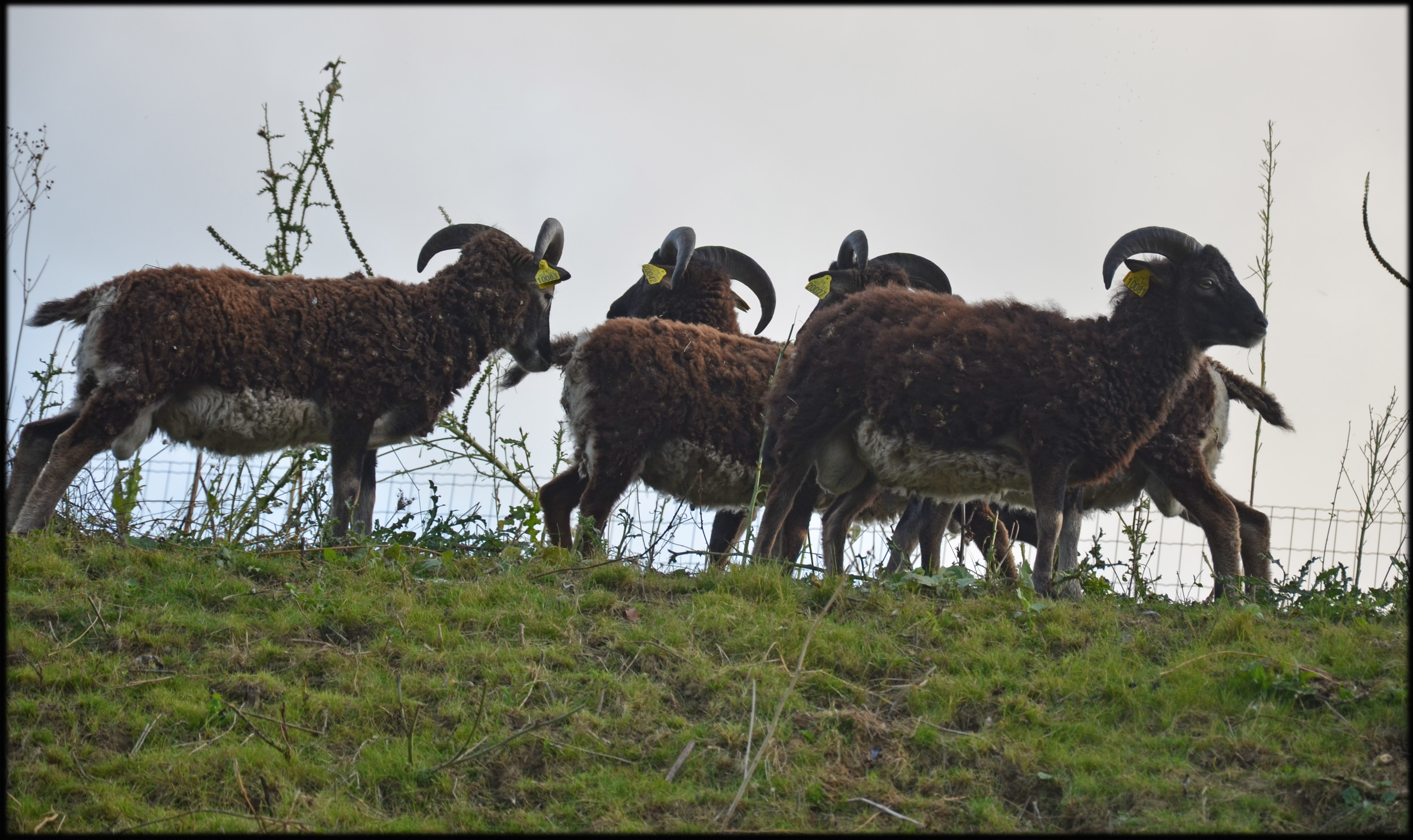
Soay sheep grazing. Morphologically similar horn type implies sexual segregation present in this flock. This image was sourced from wikicommons, and so it is unclear if the segregation was influenced by man or nature.

=== Sexual segregation in polygynous ungulates ===
Sexual segregation in Soay sheep (Ovis aries) has been observed. Soay sheep are polygynous in nature; males have multiple partners (opposed to polygynandry). Two main hypotheses have been proposed to explain the observed phenomena.

==== Sexual dimorphism-body size hypothesis ====
Male soay sheep are morphologically larger than females. Larger overall size implies larger gut size, and hence digestive efficiency. As males are larger they can subsist on lower quality food. This leads to resource partitioning of males and females and thus sexual segregation on an intraspecies level.

==== Activity budget hypothesis ====
The time taken to process food depends on the food quality; poorer/high fibre food requires more time to process and ruminate. This extra time influences behaviour and, over a group of ungulates, lead to segregation via food quality. Since males are larger and can handle low quality food, their feeding and ruminating activity will differ from females.

==== The digestive efficiency between both sexes of Soay sheep ====
Pérez-Barbería F. J., et al. (2008) tested the proposed hypothesis by feeding Soay sheep grass hay and observing the digestive efficiency between both sexes via their faecal output. Given that the supplied food is the same, more faecal matter implies less digestion and thus lower digestive effectiveness. Male Soay sheep produced less faecal matter than females. Although this result is consistent with the Jarman–Bell principle in that it observes the relationship between size and food quality, it does not adequately explain the proposed hypotheses.

For hypothesis (1), the sheep were kept in an environment where the food abundance and quality were controlled. There was no need for resources to be partitioned and segregation to occur.

For hypothesis (2), there are many external factors which may influence behavioural changes in males, enough to induce sexual segregation, that are not explored in Pérez-Barbería F. J, et al. experiment. In the experiment, the sheep were kept in a controlled environment with a controlled diet (monitoring for digestive efficiency only). Males consume more food than females, thereby having a greater allowance of energy to expend. Activities such as predator lookout, migration or simply standing all use energy, and since males have more energy, there could be enough leeway to induce sexual segregation. However, the cost:benefit ratio of segregating from a group remains equivocal and hard to test.

==== Size induced sexual segregation threshold ====
By observing effective food digestibility in Soay sheep, the Jarman–Bell principle seems to apply at an intraspecific level. The threshold at which this occurs was tested at 30%, but other studies (Ruckstuhl and Neuhaus 2002) have shown the threshold to be close to 20%

=== Modelling primate behavior ===
Primates are very diverse in their dietary range, general morphological and physiological adaptations. The Jarman–Bell principle was used to help organise these variables. It expects a negative trend between body size and food quality. This trend is supported by observed primate adaptations and how they help them survive in their environment. It can also be used to hypothesis the general diet of newly discovered/mysterious primates that have not been researched by taking into account the animal's body size. For example, information about pygmy chimpanzees was scarce around 1980s. However, it was expected to have a fruity diet.

Steven J. C. Gaulin examined 102 primate species (from various scientific literature) for links between size and diet, and hence the Jarman–Bell principle. Omnivorous primates seemed inconsistent with the trend, likely due to the diversity of their diet.

==== Carnivorous diets ====
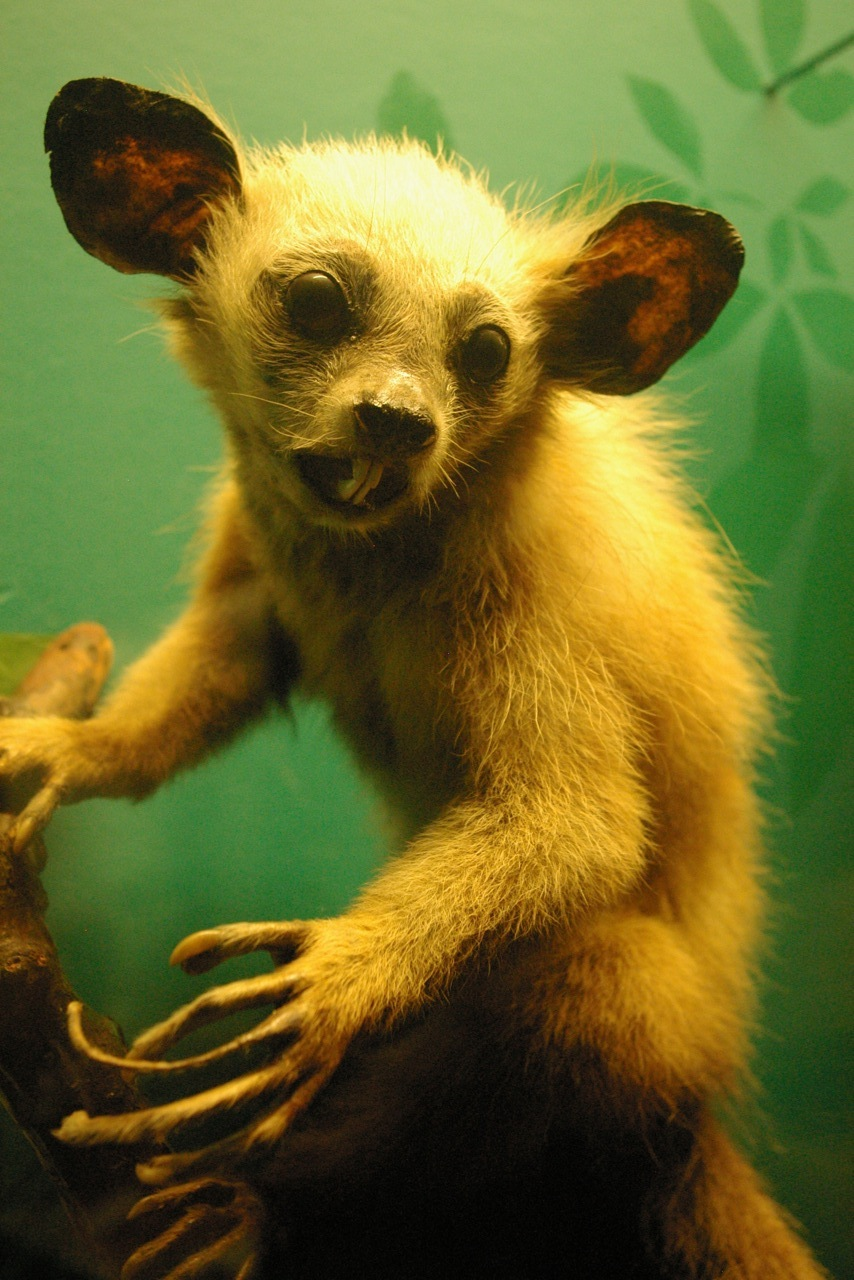
Aye-aye. Note the elongated fingers for echo-locating prey.

- The aye-aye is a large primate for its nearly exclusive insectivorous diet. This seems inconsistent with the Jarman–Bell principle. However, specialised adaptations, such as large ears and elongated fingers for echolocating larvae, allow the aye-aye to subside on such diet. This supports the idea that the Jarman- Bell Principle is not universal, and that depending on the circumstances (in this case, specialised adaptations), the expected trend is not followed.

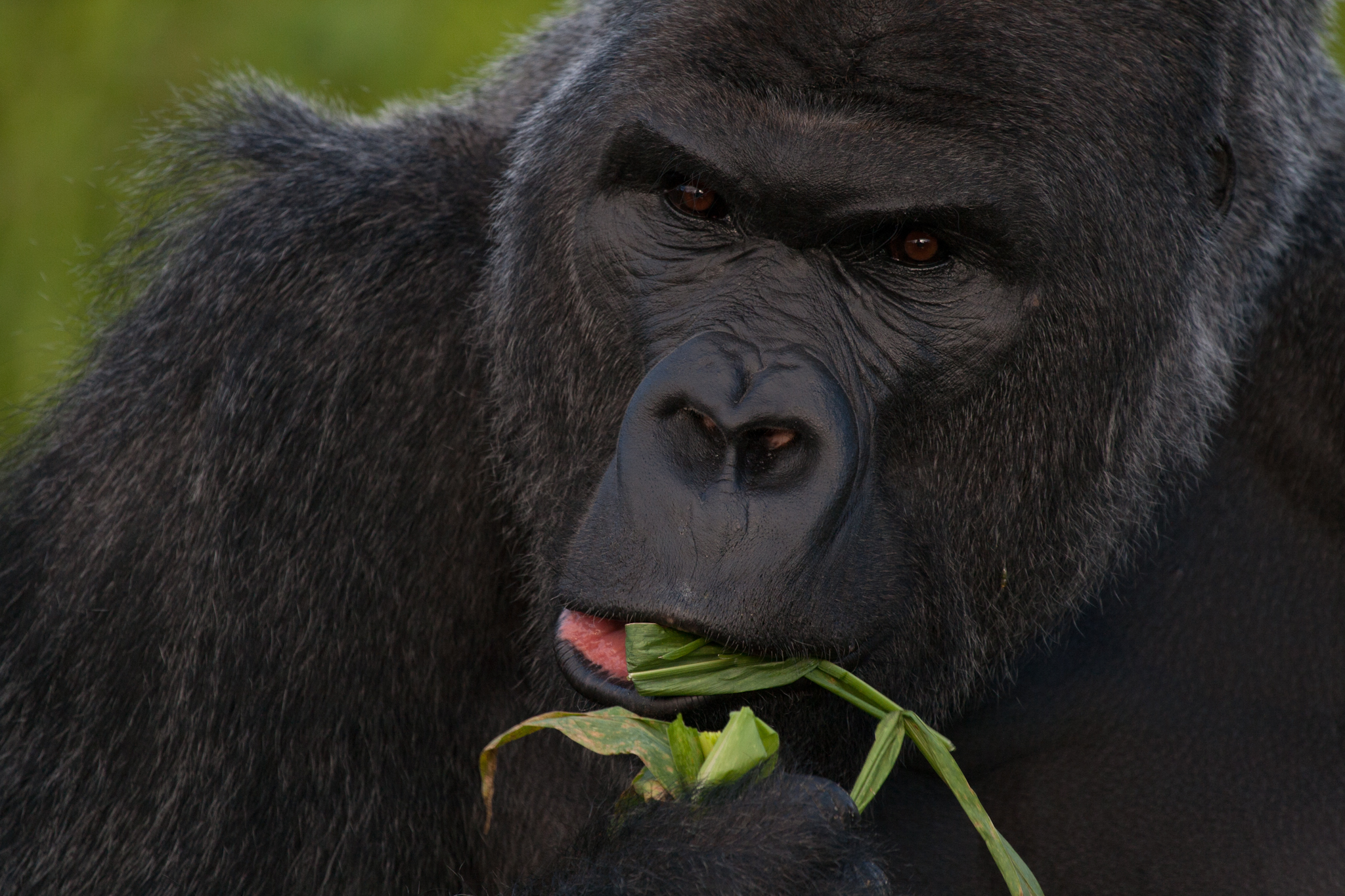
A western lowland gorilla eating herbivorous food

==== Herbivorous diets ====
- Colobines which feed heavily on low- quality food display ruminant like qualities such as digestion via symbiotic microbes in a separate forestomach.
- Weasel sportive lemurs are extremely small folivores. They practice coprophagy to maximise nutrient extraction.
- The Western gorilla is large and highly herbivorous; its diet contains 90% herbivorous food.

==== Omnivorous diets ====
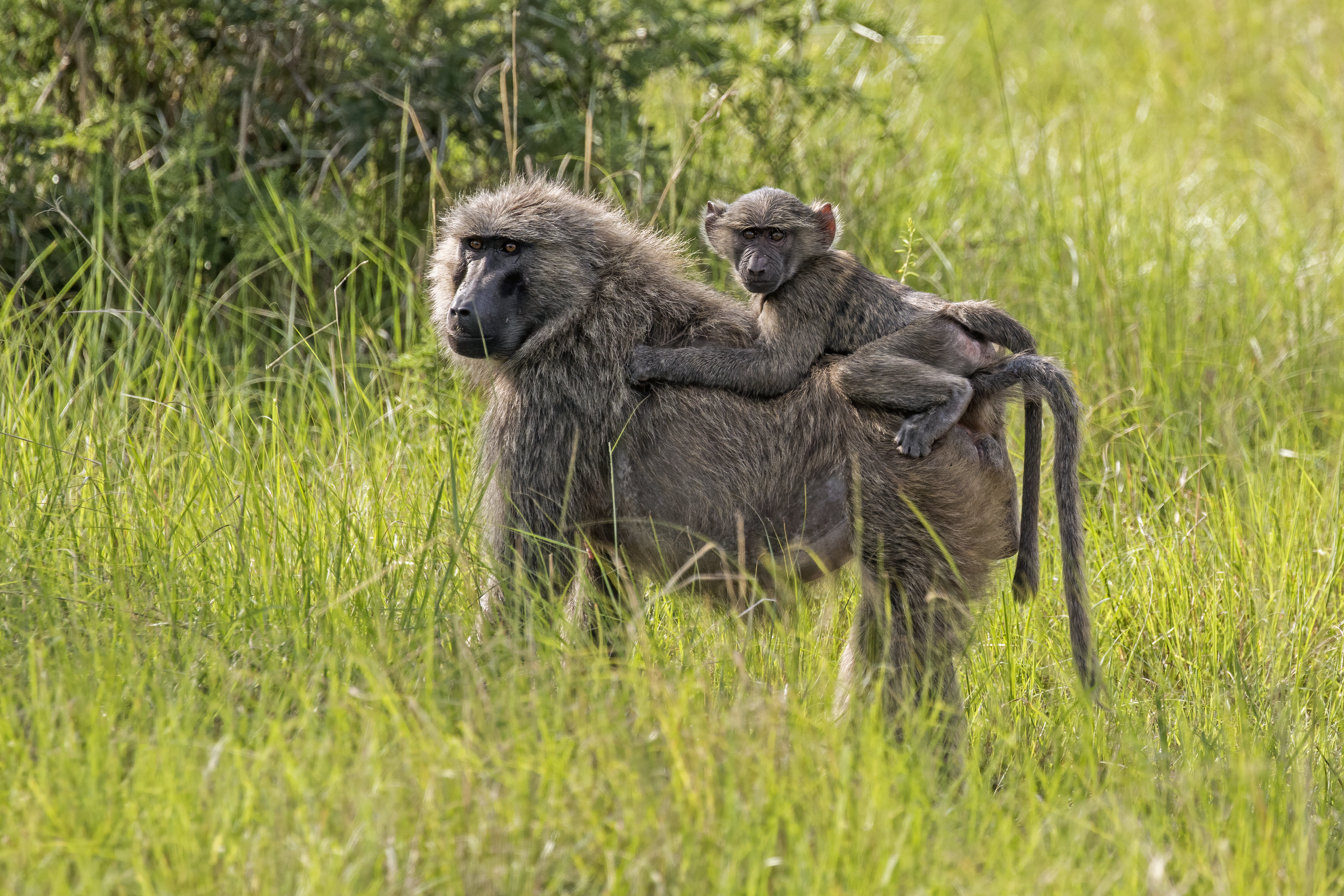
Baboon out in the open country biome

- Omnivorous cercopithecoids such as baboons and the patas monkey display the second largest average body mass.
- Humans feature such a diverse range of diet that they do not rely on one particular food group.

Both of the above omnivores and the majority of primate omnivores live in open ranges, particularly ecotonal regions (where two biomes meet). In these environments, food abundance is comparatively lower than forest biomes. The diet would shift to a mixture of low amounts of high-quality food, and high amounts of low-quality food to maximise forage and energy.

==== The universality of the Jarman–Bell principle ====
Deviations from the expected trend question the universality of the principle. Steven J. C. Gaulin notes that, when the principle is applied to offer any type of explanation, it is subjected to numerous other phenomena that occur at the same time. For example, the habitat range constrains the size of an organism; large primates are too heavy to live on tree tops. Or perhaps the use of adaptations or even tools were enough to allow viable consumption of food quality that would not otherwise be sufficient.

=== Gigantism in dinosaurs ===
Extinct dinosaurs, particularly the large sauropods, can be imagined primarily through two methods. Method one involves fossil records; bones and dentition. Method two involves drawing ideas from extant animals and how their body mass is linked with their diet.

==== Comparing digestion in extant, herbivorous reptiles and mammals and relating this to Sauropod gigantism ====
Reptiles generally have a shorter retention time than mammals. However, this loss of digestive efficiency is offset by their ability to process food into smaller particles for digestion. Smaller particles are easier to digest and ferment.

As sauropods are reptiles, it would be expected that they have a similar retention time to extant reptiles. However, the lack of particle reduction mechanisms (e.g. gastric mills, chewing teeth) challenges this expectation. Marcus Clauss et al. hypothesised that sauropods have a very enlarged gut capacity to account for this. Retention time is inversely proportional to intake amount. Therefore, an enlarged gut cavity allows increased intake, and thus shorter retention time similar to other herbivorous reptiles.

==== Nutrient constraints ====
D. M. Wilkinson and G. D. Ruxton considered the available nutrients as a driving factor for sauropod gigantism. Sauropods appeared during the late triassic period and became extinct at the end of the cretaceous period. During this time period, herbivorous plant matter such as conifers, ginkgos, cycads, ferns and horsetails may have been the dietary choice of sauropods. These plants have a high carbon/nitrogen content. Large amounts of these plant matter would be consumed to meet the bodily nitrogen requirement. Hence, more carbon content is consumed than required.

Clauss Hummel et al. (2005), cited in D. M. Wilkinson and G. D. Ruxton's paper, argues that larger sizes does not necessarily improve digestive efficiency. Rather, it allows nutrient prioritisation. For example, if there exists a diet with high carbon but low nitrogen content, then meeting the nitrogen dietary requirement suggests consuming a high level of carbon diet. Since gut volume scales linearly with body mass, larger animals have more capacity to digests food.
