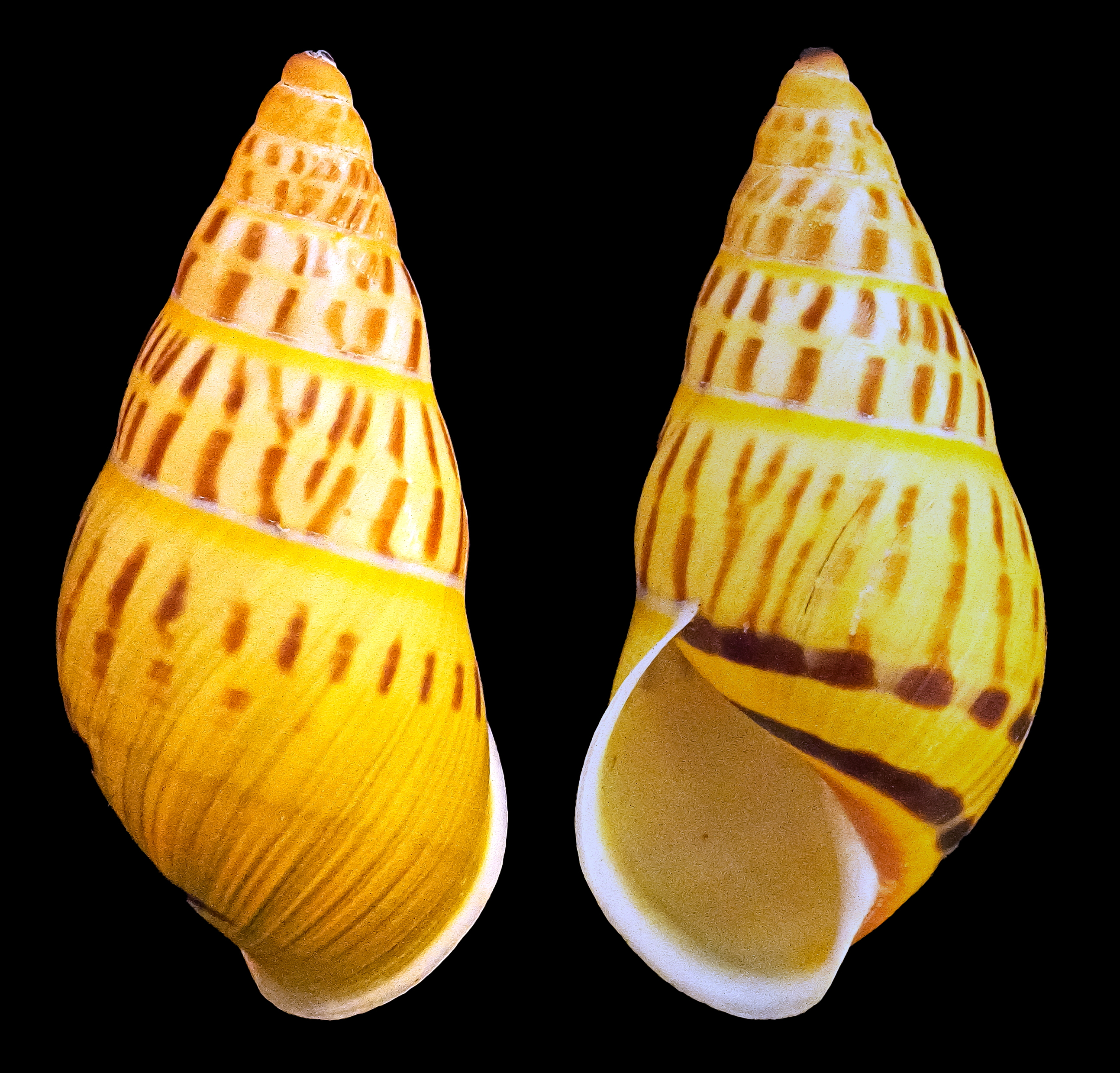
- Shell of Amphidromus maryae (holotype at the MNHN, Paris)

Scientific classification
- Kingdom: Animalia
- Phylum: Mollusca
- Class: Gastropoda
- Order: Stylommatophora
- Family: Camaenidae
- Genus: Amphidromus
- Species: A. maryae

Binomial name
- Amphidromus maryae Thach, 2021

= Amphidromus maryae =

Species of tree snail

Amphidromus maryae is a species of air-breathing tree snail, an arboreal, detritivorous, and grazing gastropod mollusk in the family Camaenidae.

== Description ==
The length of this sinistral shell attains 29.4 mm.

== Distribution ==
This species is endemic to Vietnam.
