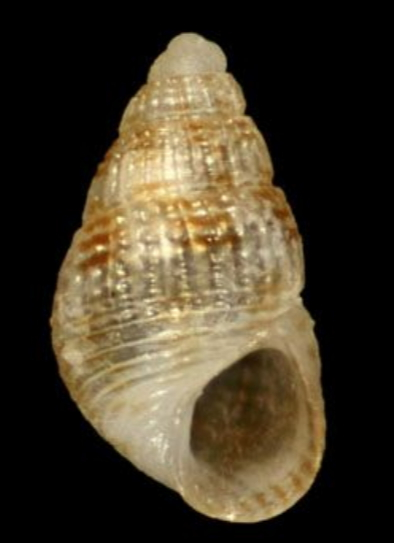
- Shell of Alvania nicolauensis (specimen at Natural History Museum, Rotterdam)

Scientific classification
- Kingdom: Animalia
- Phylum: Mollusca
- Class: Gastropoda
- Subclass: Caenogastropoda
- Order: Littorinimorpha
- Family: Rissoidae
- Genus: Alvania
- Species: A. nicolauensis

Binomial name
- Alvania nicolauensis Moolenbeek & Rolán, 1988

= Alvania nicolauensis =

Species of gastropod

Alvania nicolauensis is a species of small sea snail, a marine gastropod mollusk or micromollusk in the family Rissoidae.

The species is endemic to the Cape Verde Archipelago. The species name refers to the island of São Nicolau, but it has been found near the coasts of other Cape Verde islands as well.

== Description ==
Alvania nicolauensis is a grazer who feeds on detritus on the ocean floor. Specimens are usually brown or white in color. The shell has four large whorls taking up most of its size. It has a small parietal wall. There is a crossed pattern of indentations across the shell, giving it a textured look. The shell length can be up to 2.7mm.
