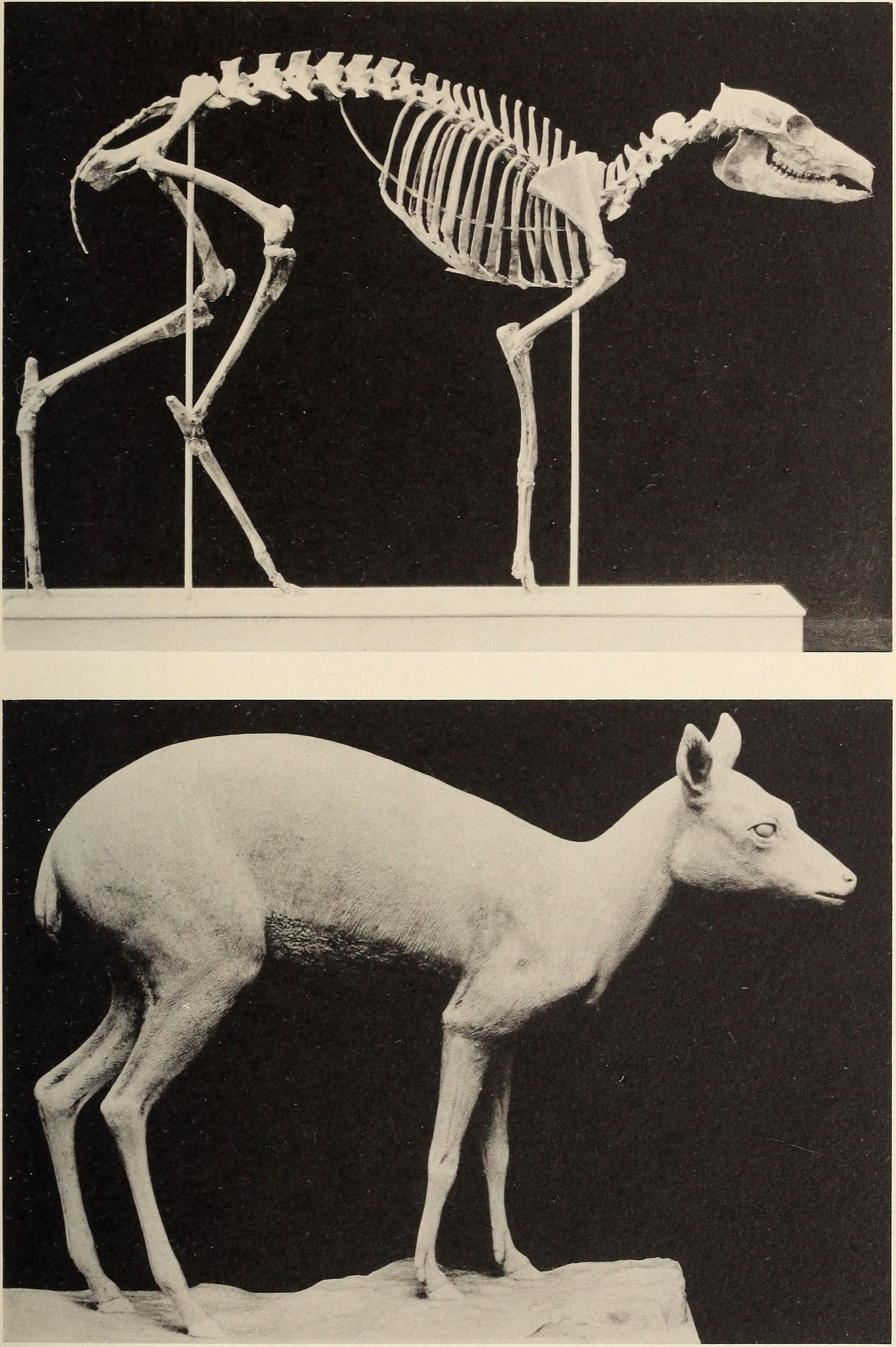
- A mount and restoration of Leptomeryx

Scientific classification
- Kingdom: Animalia
- Phylum: Chordata
- Class: Mammalia
- Order: Artiodactyla
- Suborder: Ruminantia
- Family: †Leptomerycidae; Zittel, 1893

Genera
- †Hendryomeryx; †Hidrosotherium; †Leptomeryx; †Pipestoneia (?); †Pronodens; †Pseudoparablastomeryx; †Santuccimeryx

= Leptomerycidae =

Leptomerycidae Temporal range: Middle Eocene–Middle Miocene

Extinct family of mammals

Leptomerycidae is an extinct family of ruminants endemic to North America during the middle Eocene to middle Miocene, making it the longest-living group of ruminants on the continent. Members of the group are medium sized mammals similar in shape to the modern mouse deer, a group which it has been suggested to have been related to, but there were a number of differences. These would mostly be present in the skull with these animals heavily reducing their canines, in contrast to the large canines seen in their relatives. Similar to their overall body shape, members of the family are generally compared to mouse deer in ecology with them also being suggested to be small nocturnal browsers.

== History and Classification ==
The type genus, Leptomeryx, was one of the first paleogene ruminants to be described in North America with it being described by Zittel in 1893 with the clade being recognized as a subfamily of Tragulidae. The first paper to use the clade at family level would be Scott in 1897 though a number of taxa included in the family in this publication would be a mix of current members along with hypertragulids and protoceratids. This would be dismissed by other researchers with it usually being considered a subfamily of Hypertragulidae until Gazin would note a number of traits differentiating the groups in 1955. Similar to those placed in the family by Scott in 1897, this publication would place a number of taxa into the family that are now understood to be early protoceratids and camelids. Another paper would be published in 1976 by Taylor and Webb in support of this family level designation. Along with this, the publication would also extend the range of the group to the middle miocene along with starting to use the more current definition of the family. The main difference between the understanding of the group of now and at the publication of the 1976 paper would be the inclusion of Archaomerycidae which was a subfamily of Leptomeycidae at the time. This group would later be elevated to family level in 2000 by Vislobokova and Trofimov, causing members of the group to be only known from North America.

The exact placement of the family within Pecora has been inconsistent with in generally being placed within Traguloidea by papers such as the one published by Métais and Vislobokova in 2007. This is in contrast to one published in 2009 by Spaulding et al. which placed the group as sister to Moschidae which this potentially coming from the lack of other more basal hornless ruminants in the phylogeny. Most more recent papers largely consider the family to be at least close to Tragulidae, being placed within Traguliodia. Below is the phylogeny in Métais and Vislobokova showing the family's close relation to the extant family Tragulidae.

- - †Lophiomerycidae
  - †Archaeomerycidae
  - - †Praetragulidae
    - †Hypertragulidae
  - - Tragulidae
    - †Leptomerycidae
    - - †Bachitheriidae
      - †Gelocidae

This is in contrast to when Leptomeryx itself is included in much larger phylogenies which place the genus further away from tragulidae, instead forming a clade with Hypertragulus. This grouping is seen in a number of more recent papers such as the one used in the 2021 paper by Mennecart et al. which used a set of characters from the 2015 by Mennecart and Métais. This classification would place the family outside of crown group Ruminants. Below is the tree mentioned.

- Ruminantia
  - Archaeomeryx optatus
  - - - Leptomeryx evansi
      - Hypertragulus calcaratus
    - - Lophiomeryx chalaniati
      - - Gelocus communis
        - Crown Ruminantia
          - - - Bachitherium curtum
              - Bachitherium insigne
            - Tragulidae
              - - Nalameryx savagei
                - Nalameryx sulaimani
              - - Archaeotragulus krabiensis
                - Iberomeryx minor
          - Pecora
            - - Notomeryx besensis
              - Indomeryx cotteri
            - - Mosaicomeryx quercyi
              - - Prodremotherium elongatum
                - - Pseudomeryx gobiensis
                  - - Dremotherium feignouxi
                    - - Dremotherium guthi
                      - - Amphitragulus elegans
                        - Amphitragulus quercyi

== Description ==
=== Skull ===
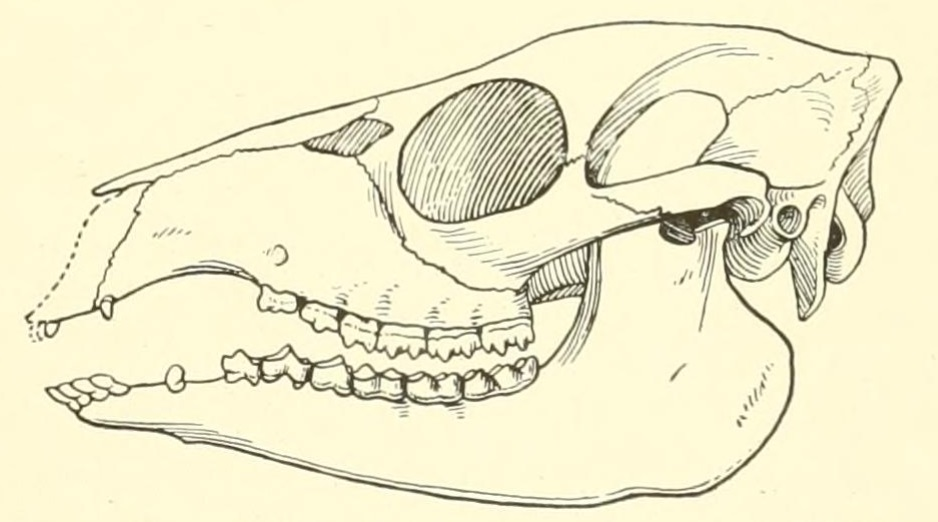
The skull Leptomeryx evansi

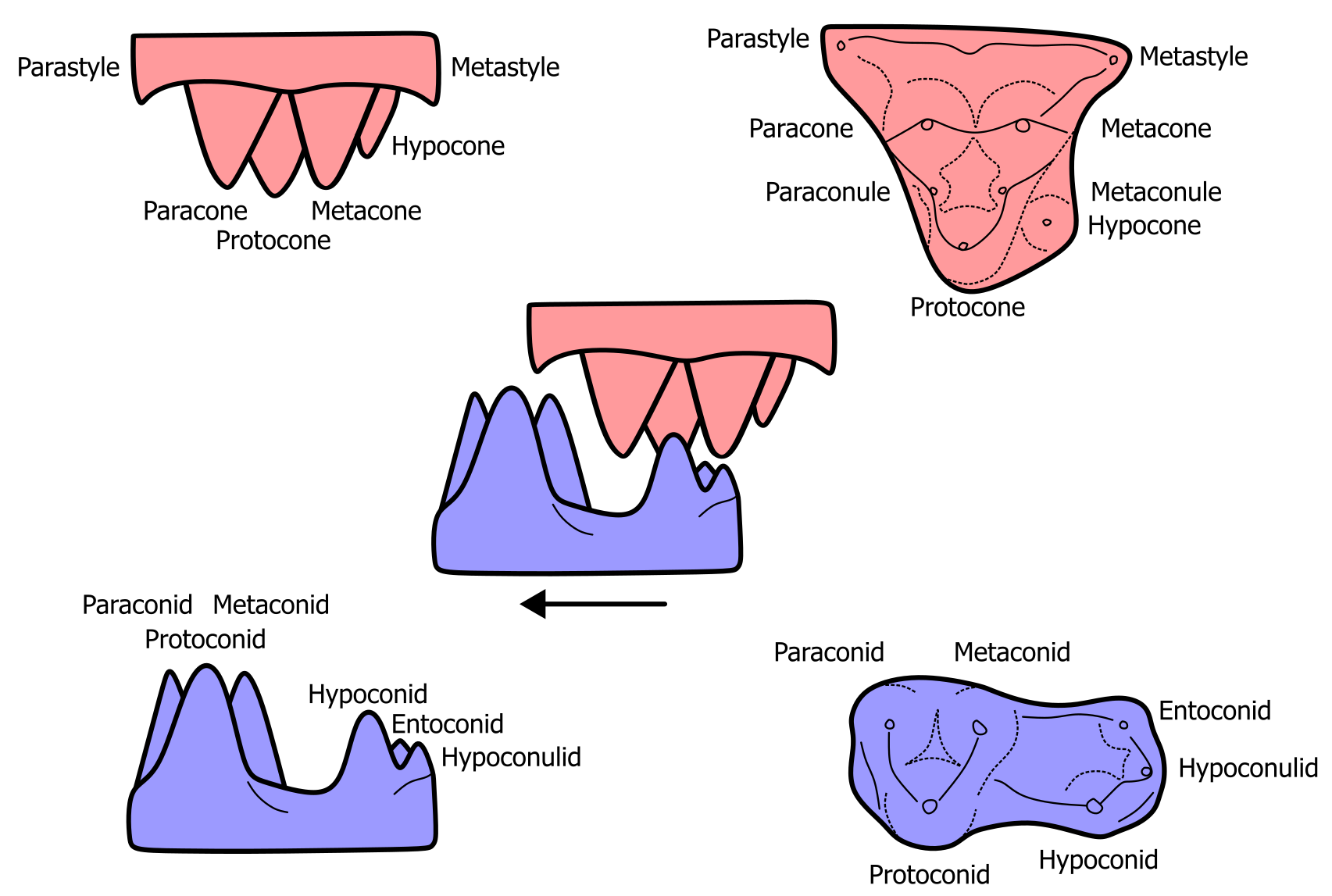
A diagram of tribosphenic molar teeth showing the terminology of certain parts of the teeth

The skull of leptomerycids was generally similar to other early ruminant groups such as Hypertragulidae, though with a more elongated rostrum. The orbits, as in other early ruminants, are placed near the center of the skull but are closed towards the back by the postorbital bar. The cranium is known from almost every genus traditionally accepted to be placed within the family. The skull of the basal-most member Hendryomeryx is different from other taxa due to features such as a more sloped cranium. The cranial morphology of the more derived members of the group does not differ as much, though Leptomeryx does have a longer rostrum than Pseudoblastomeryx, which has a much shorter, brachycephalic skull.

Similar to many other artiodactyls, members of the family lost the upper incisors but kept them on the lower jaw. The first lower incisors of members of the group would have been procumbent, similar to those of rodents, with this being pushed furthest in the genus Pronodens, whose first incisors are commonly described as being tusk-like. Unlike those of groups where the canines occlude one another, the upper canine of leptomercids occludes with a caniniform first premolar. This is also seen in other ungulate groups such as oreodonts and protoceratids. This small premolar is far away from any other teeth in the mandible, having large diastemas towards the front and back. The actual lower canine is located closer to the incisors and is generally much closer in morphology to the mentioned teeth. The other premolars are more similar to what one would expect, with the p2 lacking a paraconid, in contrast to the developed paraconids on the p3 and p4. Similar to the loss of incisors, the upper jaw of leptomerycids either has an extremely reduced or completely absent first premolar. The upper premolars that are present possess a protocone with it being crescent-shaped on the P4 and lingual in P2 and P3.

=== Postcranium ===
Members of Leptomerycidae are generally considered to be medium-sized ruminants with the type genus being estimated to have a mass of 3 kilograms (6.6 lb) Like other early ruminants, the postcranium of these animals superficially resembled that of the modern mouse deer, though with some differences. The morphology of the limbs is one of the most important postcranial features of the animals. As in other ungulate groups, digits 2 and 5 on the forelimbs are reduced, with the first digit being completely lost. Similarly, digits 2 and 5 on the hindlimb have been reduced, with digits 3 and 4 being fused together. Overall, the digit reduction is comparable to, but greater than what is seen in the earlier family Hypertragulidae. A reduction in the forelimbs is also seen, with them being proportionally shorter in leptomerycids than hypertragulids. Outside of the reduction in digits, the main defining feature of the limbs of the group is the large reduction of the fibula that is not fused to the tibia.

== Paleobiology ==
One of the most notable things about Leptomeycidae is the temporal range of the group with it ranging from the middle Eocene to middle Miocene. This extremely long range compared to a number of other groups in North America make it the longest-living group of ruminants on the continent. The diet of the group has been analyzed in multiple publications with members of the group such as Pseudoparablastomeryx and Leptomeryx being suggested to be browsers based on dentition with Leptomeryx being compared to the extant Pudu along with mouse deer. In a study by Zanazzi and Kohn published in 2008 would look at isotopes found in the molars of animals from the White River Group, Leptomeryx itself was one of the animals included with it being compared. This showed that the animal would have fed on specifically C3 plants in the Eocene, though this would change in the Oligocene when this diet would be replaced by one high in C4 plants. Along with this, the animal's dependence on water was looked at with the authors coming to the conclusion that the animal either lacked foregut fermentation or had it but was very water dependent. Another suggestion by the authors for higher water dependency is that the animal could have been nocturnal, similar to its modern relatives.
