= Hindgut fermentation =

Digestive process seen in herbivores

Hindgut fermentation is a digestive process seen in monogastric herbivores (animals with a simple, single-chambered stomach). Cellulose is digested with the aid of symbiotic microbes including bacteria, archaea, and eukaryotes. The microbial fermentation occurs in the digestive organs that follow the small intestine: the cecum and large intestine. Examples of hindgut fermenters include proboscideans and large odd-toed ungulates such as horses and rhinos, as well as small animals such as rodents, rabbits and koalas.

In contrast, foregut fermentation is the form of cellulose digestion seen in ruminants such as cattle which have a four-chambered stomach, as well as in sloths, macropodids, some monkeys, and one bird, the hoatzin.

While hindgut fermentation is typically studied as a primary digestive mechanism in specialized herbivores, a scaled-down version of the process occurs in other single-chambered stomach systems. Certain colonic monogastrics, such as humans and pigs, rely on hindgut fermentation as a supplementary metabolic pathway rather than a primary engine for survival. Unlike specialized cecal fermenters, their microbial fermentation is shifted downstream, occurring primarily within a developed large intestine (colon) rather than an enlarged cecum, and they do not produce or reingest cecotropes.

== Cecum ==
Hindgut fermenters generally have a cecum and large intestine that are much larger and more complex than those of a foregut fermenter. Research on small cecal fermenters such as flying squirrels, rabbits and lemurs has revealed these mammals to have a GI tract about 10-13 times the length of their body. This is due to the high intake of fiber and other minimally digestible compounds that are characteristic to the diet of monogastric herbivores.

Easily digestible food is processed in the gastrointestinal tract & expelled as regular feces. But in order to get nutrients out of hard to digest fiber, some smaller hindgut fermenters, like lagomorphs (rabbits, hares, pikas), ferment fiber in the cecum (at the small and large intestine junction) and then expel the contents as cecotropes, which are reingested (cecotrophy). The cecotropes are then absorbed in the small intestine to utilize the nutrients.

This process is also beneficial in allowing for restoration of the microflora population, or gut flora. These microbes are found in the gastrointestinal tract and can act as protective agents that strengthen the immune system. Small hindgut fermenters have the ability to expel their microflora, which is useful during the acts of hibernation, estivation and torpor.

== Efficiency ==
While foregut fermentation is generally considered more efficient, and monogastric animals cannot digest cellulose as efficiently as ruminants, hindgut fermentation allows animals to consume small amounts of low-quality forage all day long and thus survive in conditions where ruminants might not be able to obtain nutrition adequate for their needs. While ruminants require a good deal of time resting between meals, hindgut fermenters are able to take in smaller meals more frequently, allowing them to eat and move more readily. The large hindgut fermenters are bulk feeders: they ingest large quantities of low-nutrient food, which they process more rapidly than would be possible for a similarly sized foregut fermenter. The main food in that category is grass, and grassland grazers move over long distances to take advantage of the growth phases of grass in different regions.

== Speed ==
The ability to process food more rapidly than foregut fermenters gives hindgut fermenters an advantage at very large body size, as they are able to accommodate significantly larger food intakes. The largest extant and prehistoric megaherbivores, elephants and indricotheres (a type of rhino), respectively, have been hindgut fermenters. Study of the rates of evolution of larger maximum body mass in different terrestrial mammalian groups has shown that the fastest growth in body mass over time occurred in hindgut fermenters (perissodactyls, rodents and proboscids).

== Types ==
Hindgut fermenters are subdivided into two groups based on the relative size of various digestive organs in relationship to the rest of the system: colonic fermenters tend to be larger species such as horses, and cecal fermenters are smaller animals such as rabbits and rodents. However, in spite of the terminology, colonic fermenters such as horses make extensive use of the cecum to break down cellulose. Also, colonic fermenters typically have a proportionally longer large intestine than small intestine, whereas cecal fermenters have a considerably enlarged cecum compared to the rest of the digestive tract.

== Swine ==
Among mammals, pigs are classified as hindgut fermenters. They possess a relatively large cecum, which provides substantial space for fermentation. This fermentation occurs through interactions between the cecal digesta and the cecal microbiota. The composition of the cecal digesta reflects dietary composition, because the residues that reach the cecum are those that were not digested in the ileum and subsequently passed into the cecum.

The major components of cecal digesta are typically fibers that cannot be digested by the pig's endogenous enzymes, although some other nutrients also remain. Similarly, the composition of the cecal microbiota is largely influenced by the dietary composition. Briefly, when pigs consume a high-protein diet, the amount of undigested protein entering the cecum increases, which can elevate the abundance of ammonia-producing bacteria. In contrast, when pigs consume high-fiber diets, more fiber reaches the cecum, resulting in an increased relative abundance of fiber-degrading bacteria.

The major metabolites produced by cecal bacteria are short-chain fatty acids and ammonia. The short-chain fatty acids are primarily generated from the fermentation of dietary fiber, whereas ammonia is produced through the fermentation of protein and amino acids. Short-chain fatty acids can serve as an energy source for enterocytes and help prevent the proliferation of pathogenic bacteria by lowering the cecal pH. In contrast, ammonia can increase the luminal pH and promote the growth of pathogenic bacteria, which may cause intestinal inflammation.

== Insects ==
In addition to mammals, several insects are also hindgut fermenters, the best studied of which are the termites, which are characterised by an enlarged "paunch" of the hindgut that also houses the bulk of the gut microbiota. Digestion of wood particles in lower termites is accomplished inside the phagosomes of gut flagellates, but in the flagellate-free higher termites, this appears to be accomplished by fibre-associated bacteria.

== See also ==
- Foregut fermentation
- Pseudoruminants
- Ruminants
- Cecotrope
