= Grazing (behaviour) =

Method of feeding in herbivores, eating grasses and other plants

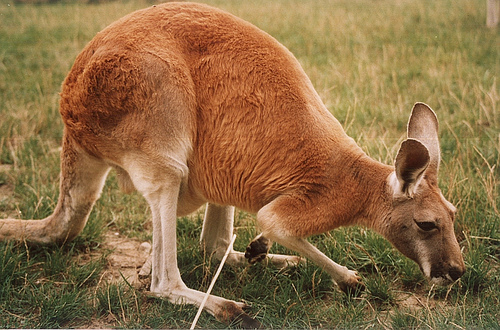
Red kangaroo grazing

Grazing is a method of foraging in which a herbivorous animal spends significant time feeding on low-growing herbaceous plants (groundcovers) such as grasses, ferns and mosses, as well as other sessile, autotrophic organisms such as algae and lichen. Many species of terrestrial and aquatic animals can be said to be grazers, from large mammals such as hippopotamuses and manatees to small aquatic snails and slugs.

Grazing behaviour is a type of feeding strategy within the ecology of a species. Specific grazing strategies include graminivory (eating grasses) and algivory (feeding on non-embryophyte autotrophs such as seaweed). Due to the relative toughness of the plant material ingested compared to other foliages, grazing animals typically evolved wear-resistant dentitions such as hypsodonty (e.g. equines and bovids) and/or continuously growing teeth (e.g. rabbits), and unorthodox digestive behaviors such as cecophagy (producing partly digested fecal pellets which are reingested), rumination (repeatedly regurgitating and re-chewing the cud) and pseudorumination (having a multi-chambered stomach but not re-chewing the cud).

Grazing's ecological effects can include redistributing nutrients, keeping grasslands open or favouring a particular species over another.

== Ecology ==
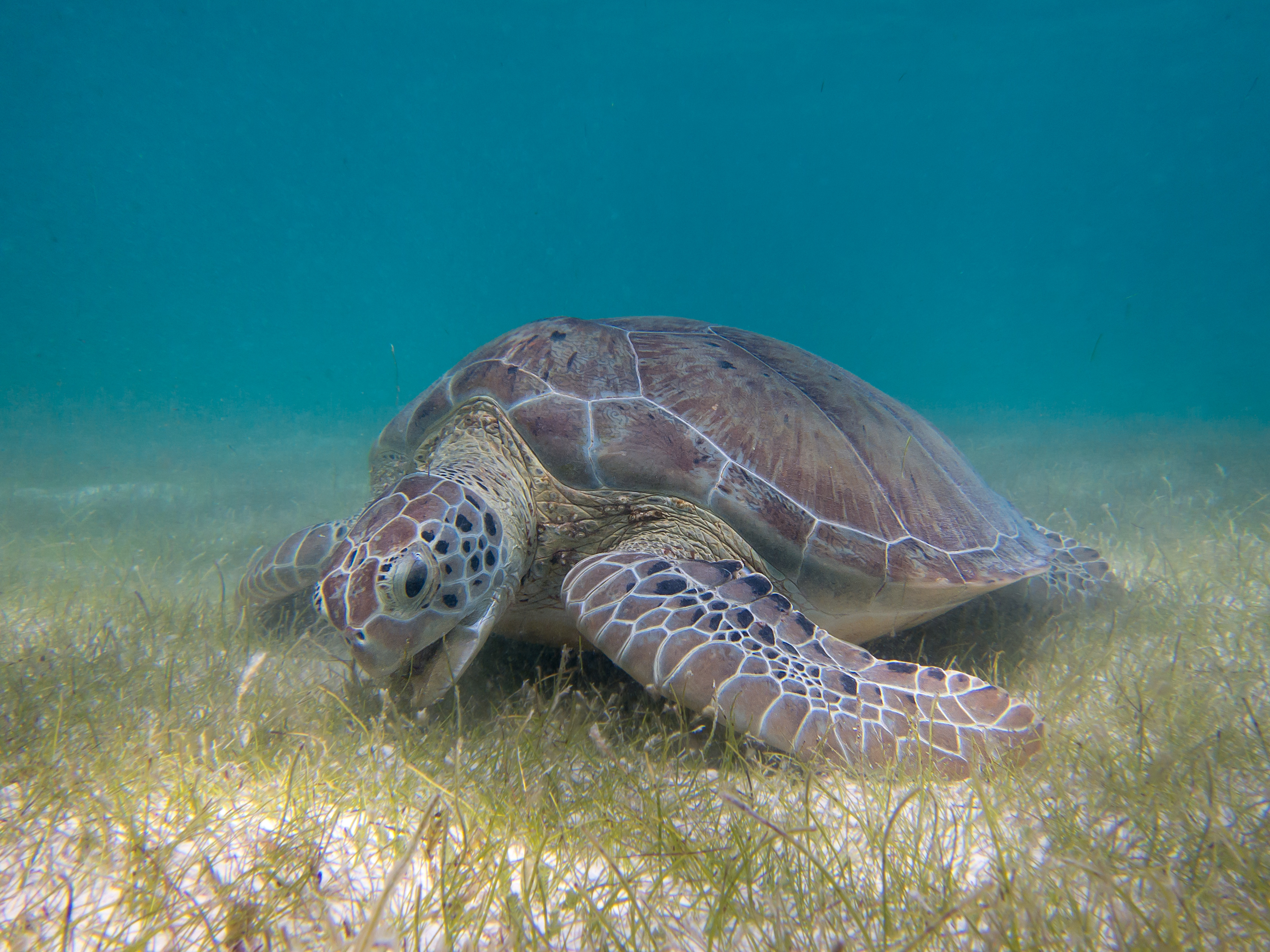
Green sea turtle grazing on seagrass

Many small selective herbivores follow larger grazers which skim off the highest, tough growth of grasses, exposing tender shoots. For terrestrial animals, grazing is normally distinguished from browsing in that grazing is eating grass or forbs, whereas browsing is eating woody twigs and leaves from trees and shrubs. Grazing differs from predation because the organism being grazed upon may not be killed. It differs from parasitism because the two organisms live together in a constant state of physical externality (i.e., low intimacy). Water animals that feed by rasping algae and other micro-organisms from stones are called grazers–scrapers.

=== Graminivory ===
Graminivory is a form of grazing involving feeding primarily on grass (specifically "true" grasses in the Poaceae). Horses, cattle, capybara, hippopotamuses, grasshoppers, geese, and giant pandas are graminivores. Giant pandas (Ailuropoda melanoleuca) are obligate bamboo grazers, 99% of their diet consisting of sub-alpine bamboo species.

=== Cecotrophy ===
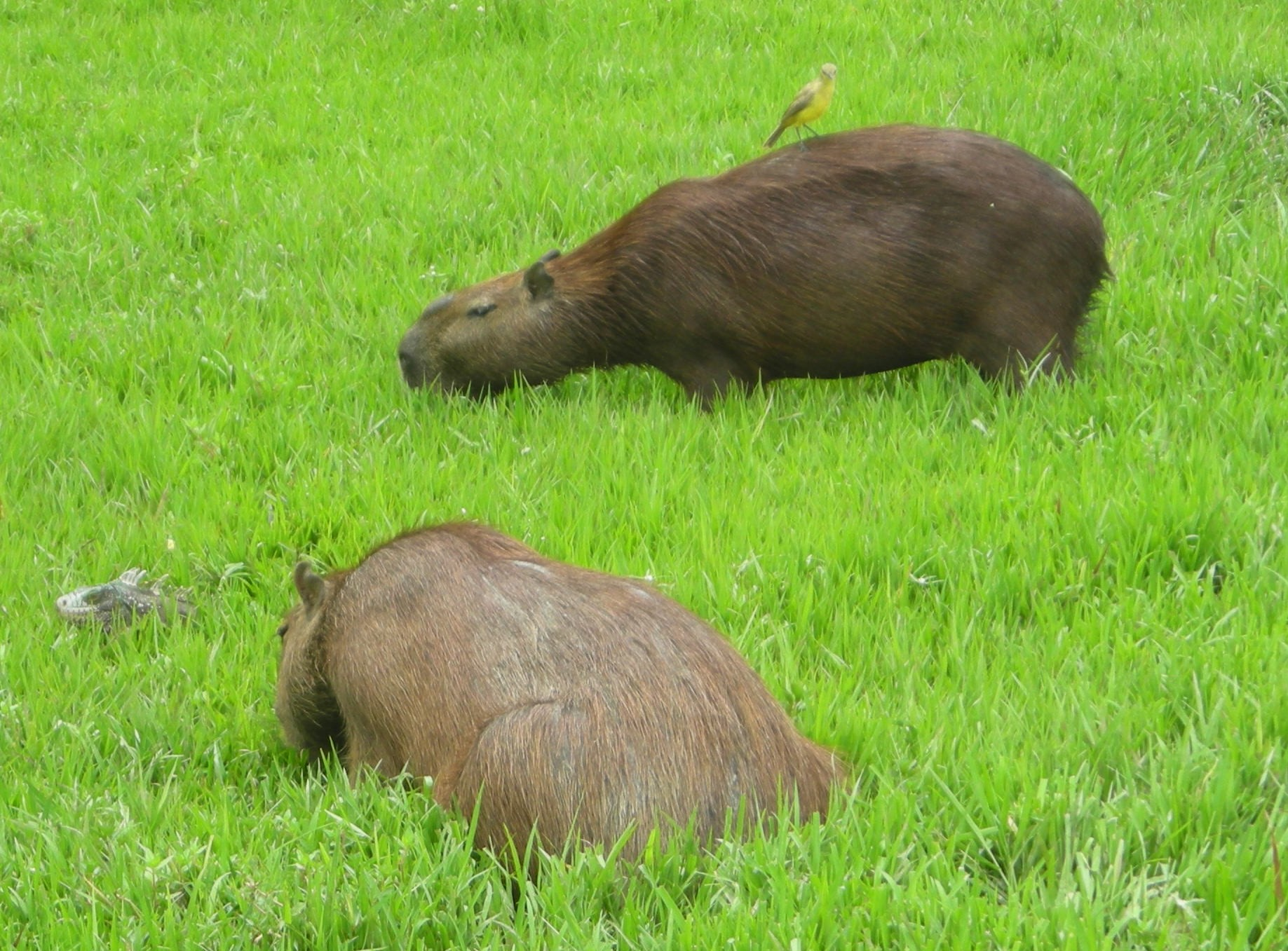
The capybara is one of several herbivores that practice cecotrophy.

For lagomorphs (rabbits, hares, pikas), easily digestible food is processed in the gastrointestinal tract & expelled as regular feces. But to get nutrients out of hard-to-digest fiber, lagomorphs ferment fiber in the cecum (in the GI tract) and then expel the contents as cecotropes, which are reingested (cecotrophy). The cecotropes are then absorbed in the small intestine to utilize the nutrients. This process is different from cows chewing their cud but with similar results.

Capybara (Hydrochoerus hydrochaeris) are herbivores that graze mainly on grasses and aquatic plants, as well as fruit and tree bark. As with other grazers, they can be very selective, feeding on the leaves of one species and disregarding other species surrounding it. They eat a greater variety of plants during the dry season, as fewer plants are available. While they eat grass during the wet season, they have to switch to more abundant reeds during the dry season. The capybara's jaw hinge is not perpendicular; hence, it chews food by grinding back-and-forth rather than side-to-side.

Like lagomorphs, capybara create, expel & eat cecotropes (cecotrophy) to get more nutrition from their food. They may also regurgitate food to masticate again, similar to cud-chewing by a cow. As with other rodents, the front teeth of capybara grow continually to compensate for the constant wear from eating grasses. Their cheek teeth also grow continuously.

=== Pseudoruminant ===
The hippopotamus is a large, semi-aquatic mammal inhabiting rivers, lakes, and mangrove swamps. During the day, they remain cool by staying in the water or mud; reproduction and childbirth occur in water. They emerge at dusk to graze on grasses. While hippopotamuses rest near each other in the water, grazing is solitary. Their incisors can be as long as 40 cm (16 in) and the canines (tusks) up to 50 cm (20 in); however, the canines and incisors are used for combat, and play no role in feeding. Hippos rely on their broad, horny lips to grasp and pull grasses which are then ground by the molars. The hippo is considered to be a pseudoruminant; it has a complex three- or four-chambered stomach but does not "chew cud".

=== Non-grass grazing ===
Although grazing is typically associated with mammals feeding on grasslands, ecologists sometimes use the word in a broader sense to include any organism that feeds on any other species without ending the life of the prey organism. Use of the term "grazing" varies further; for example, a marine biologist may describe herbivorous sea urchins that feed on kelp as grazers, even when they kill the organism by cutting the plant at the base. Malacologists sometimes apply the word to aquatic snails that feed by consuming the microscopic film of algae, diatoms and detritus—a biofilm—that covers the substrate and other surfaces underwater. In marine ecosystems, grazing by mesograzers such as some crustaceans maintains habitat structure by preventing algal overgrowth, especially in coral reefs.

== Benefits ==
=== Environmental ===
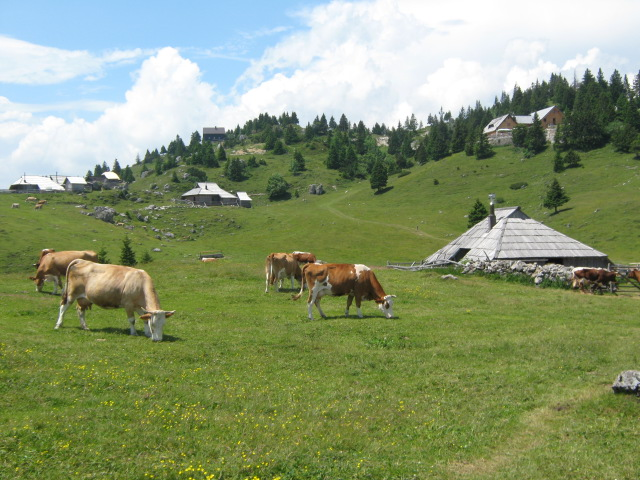
Cattle grazing in a high-elevation environment at the Big Pasture Plateau, Slovenia

Grazer urine and feces "recycle nitrogen, phosphorus, potassium and other plant nutrients and return them to the soil". Grazing can allow for the accumulation of organic matter which may help to combat soil erosion. This acts as nutrition for insects and organisms found within the soil. These organisms "aid in carbon sequestration and water filtration".

=== Biodiversity ===
When grass is grazed, dead litter grass is reduced which is advantageous for birds such as waterfowl. Grazing can increase biodiversity. Without grazing, many of the same grasses grow, for example brome and bluegrass, consequently producing a monoculture.

In North American tallgrass prairies, diversity and productivity are controlled to a large extent by nitrogen availability ... Nitrogen availability in prairies was driven by interactions between frequency of fires and grazing by large herbivores ... Spring fires enhance growth of certain grasses, and herbivores such as bison preferentially graze these grasses, keeping a system of checks and balances working properly, and allowing many plant species to flourish.
