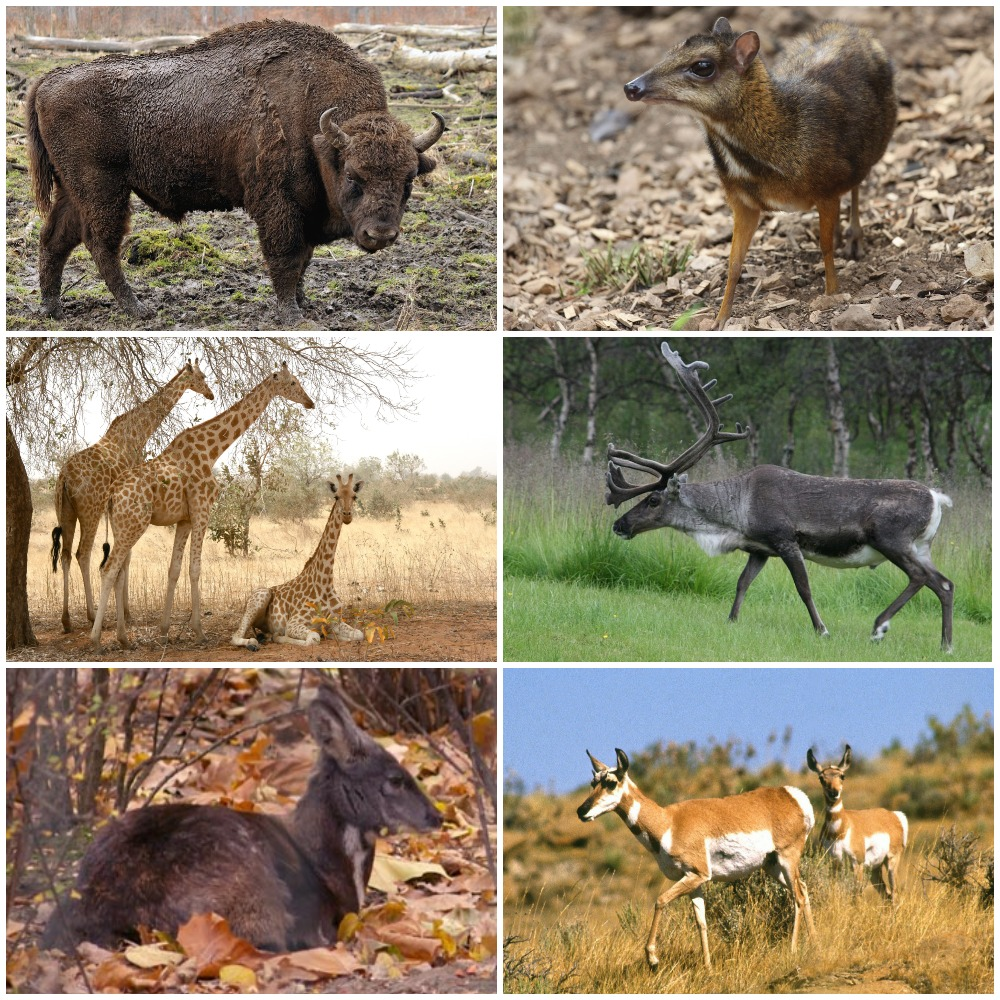

Scientific classification
- Kingdom: Animalia
- Phylum: Chordata
- Class: Mammalia
- Order: Artiodactyla
- Clade: Cetruminantia
- Clade: Ruminantiamorpha; Spaulding et al., 2009
- Suborder: Ruminantia; Scopoli, 1777

Infraorders
- "Tragulina"; Pecora

= Ruminant =

Ruminants Temporal range: Early Eocene – present

Hoofed herbivorous grazing or browsing mammals

Most deer, such as axis deer, are both grazers and browsers.

Ruminants are herbivorous grazing or browsing artiodactyls belonging to the suborder Ruminantia that are able to easily acquire nutrients from plant-based fibers (such as cellulose) by fermenting it in a specialized stomach prior to digestion, principally through microbial actions. The process, which takes place in the front part of the digestive system and therefore is called foregut fermentation, typically requires the fermented ingesta (known as cud) to be regurgitated and chewed again. The process of rechewing the ingesta to further break down plant matter and stimulate digestion is called rumination or chewing the cud.

The roughly 200 species of ruminants include both domestic and wild species. Ruminating mammals include cattle, all domesticated and wild bovines, goats, sheep, giraffes, deer, gazelles, and antelopes. It has also been suggested that notoungulates also relied on rumination, as opposed to other atlantogenatans that rely on the more typical hindgut fermentation, though this is not entirely certain.

Ruminants represent the most diverse group of living ungulates. The suborder Ruminantia includes six different families: Tragulidae, Giraffidae, Antilocapridae, Cervidae, Moschidae, and Bovidae.

== Etymology ==
The word ruminant comes from Latin rūminārī, "to ruminate", from rūmen, the first stomach. The manner in which food is regurgitated and rechewed is called rumination.

== Taxonomy and evolution ==
The first fossil ruminants appeared in the Early Eocene and were small, likely omnivorous, forest-dwellers. Artiodactyls with cranial appendages first occur in the early Miocene.

=== Phylogeny ===
Ruminantia is a crown group of ruminants within the order Artiodactyla, cladistically defined by Spaulding et al. as "the least inclusive clade that includes Bos taurus (cow) and Tragulus napu (mouse deer)". Ruminantiamorpha is a higher-level clade of artiodactyls, cladistically defined by Spaulding et al. as "Ruminantia plus all extinct taxa more closely related to extant members of Ruminantia than to any other living species." This is a stem-based definition for Ruminantiamorpha, and is more inclusive than the crown group Ruminantia. As a crown group, Ruminantia only includes the last common ancestor of all extant (living) ruminants and their descendants (living or extinct), whereas Ruminantiamorpha, as a stem group, also includes more basal extinct ruminant ancestors that are more closely related to living ruminants than to other members of Artiodactyla. When considering only living taxa (neontology), this makes Ruminantiamorpha and Ruminantia synonymous, and only Ruminantia is used. Thus, Ruminantiamorpha is only used in the context of paleontology. Accordingly, Spaulding grouped some genera of the extinct family Anthracotheriidae within Ruminantiamorpha (but not in Ruminantia), but placed others within Ruminantiamorpha's sister clade, Cetancodontamorpha.

Ruminantia's placement within Artiodactyla can be represented in the following cladogram:

- Artiodactyla
  - Tylopoda (camels)
  - Artiofabula
    - Suina (pigs)
    - Cetruminantia
      - Ruminantia (ruminants)
        - Tragulidae (mouse deer)
        - Pecora (horn bearers)
      - Cetancodonta/Whippomorpha
        - Hippopotamidae (hippopotamuses)
        - Cetacea (whales)

Within Ruminantia, the Tragulidae (mouse-deer) are considered the most basal family, with the remaining ruminants classified as belonging to the infraorder Pecora. Until the beginning of the 21st century, it was understood that the family Moschidae (musk deer) was sister to Cervidae. However, a 2003 phylogenetic study by Alexandre Hassanin (of National Museum of Natural History, France) and colleagues, based on mitochondrial and nuclear analyses, revealed that Moschidae and Bovidae form a clade sister to Cervidae. According to the study, Cervidae diverged from the Bovidae-Moschidae clade 27 to 28 million years ago. The following cladogram is based on a large-scale genome ruminant genome sequence study from 2019:

- Ruminantia
  - Tragulina
    Tragulidae
  - Pecora
    - - Antilocapridae
      - Giraffidae
    - - Cervidae
      - - Bovidae
        - Moschidae

(Video) An impala swallowing and then regurgitating food – a behaviour known as "chewing the cud"

=== Classification ===
- Order Artiodactyla
  - Suborder Tylopoda: camels and llamas, 7 living species in 3 genera
  - Suborder Suina: pigs and peccaries
  - Suborder Cetruminantia: ruminants, whales and hippos
    - Clade Ruminantia
      - Infraorder Tragulina (paraphyletic)
        - Family †Leptomerycidae
        - Family †Hypertragulidae
        - Family †Praetragulidae
        - Family †Gelocidae
        - Family †Bachitheriidae
        - Family Tragulidae: chevrotains, 6 living species in 4 genera
        - Family †Archaeomerycidae
        - Family †Lophiomerycidae
      - Infraorder Pecora
        - Family Cervidae: deer and moose, 49 living species in 16 genera
        - Family †Palaeomerycidae
        - Family †Dromomerycidae
        - Family †Hoplitomerycidae
        - Family †Climacoceratidae
        - Family Giraffidae: giraffe and okapi, 2 living species in 2 genera
        - Family Antilocapridae: pronghorn, one living species in one genus
        - Family Moschidae: musk deer, 4 living species in one genus
        - Family Bovidae: cattle, goats, sheep, and antelope, 143 living species in 53 genera

== Digestive system of ruminants ==
Hofmann and Stewart divided ruminants into three major categories based on their feed type and feeding habits: concentrate selectors, intermediate types, and grass/roughage eaters, with the assumption that feeding habits in ruminants cause morphological differences in their digestive systems, including salivary glands, rumen size, and rumen papillae. However, Woodall found that there is little correlation between the fiber content of a ruminant's diet and morphological characteristics, meaning that the categorical divisions of ruminants by Hofmann and Stewart warrant further research.

Also, some mammals are pseudoruminants, which have a three-compartment stomach instead of four like ruminants. The Hippopotamidae (comprising hippopotamuses) are well-known examples. Pseudoruminants, like traditional ruminants, are foregut fermentors and most ruminate or chew cud. However, their anatomy and method of digestion differs significantly from that of a four-chambered ruminant.

Monogastric herbivores, such as rhinoceroses, horses, guinea pigs, and rabbits, are not ruminants, as they have a simple single-chambered stomach. Being hindgut fermenters, these animals ferment cellulose in an enlarged cecum. In smaller hindgut fermenters of the order Lagomorpha (rabbits, hares, and pikas), and Caviomorph rodents (Guinea pigs, capybaras, etc.), material from the cecum is formed into cecotropes, passed through the large intestine, expelled and subsequently reingested to absorb nutrients in the cecotropes. In contrast, colonic monogastrics such as humans and pigs possess a simple, single-chambered stomach but utilize hindgut fermentation as a supplementary metabolic pathway. Unlike specialized cecal fermenters, their microbial fermentation occurs primarily within a developed large intestine (colon) rather than an enlarged cecum, and they do not produce or reingest cecotropes.

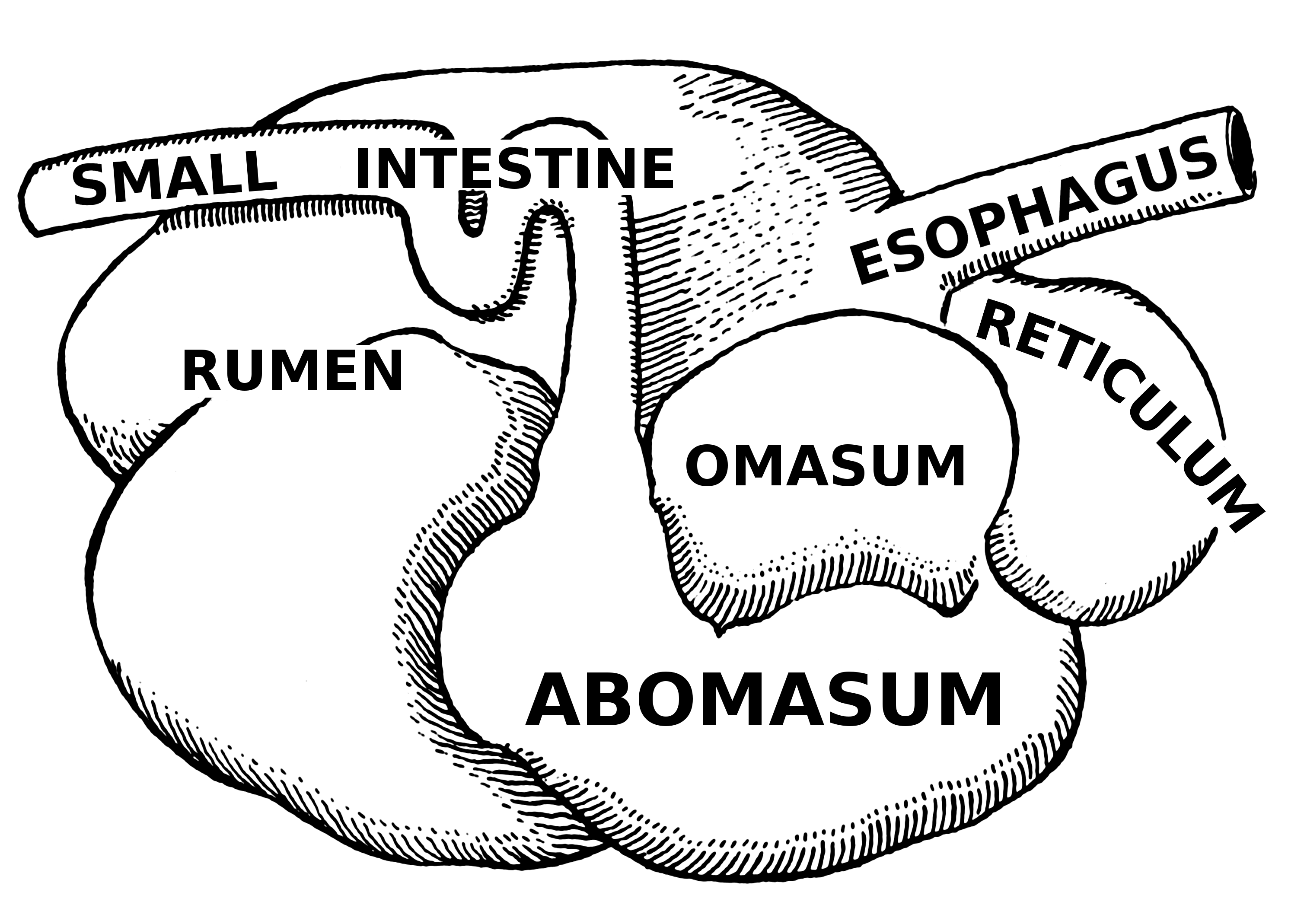
Stylised illustration of a ruminant digestive system

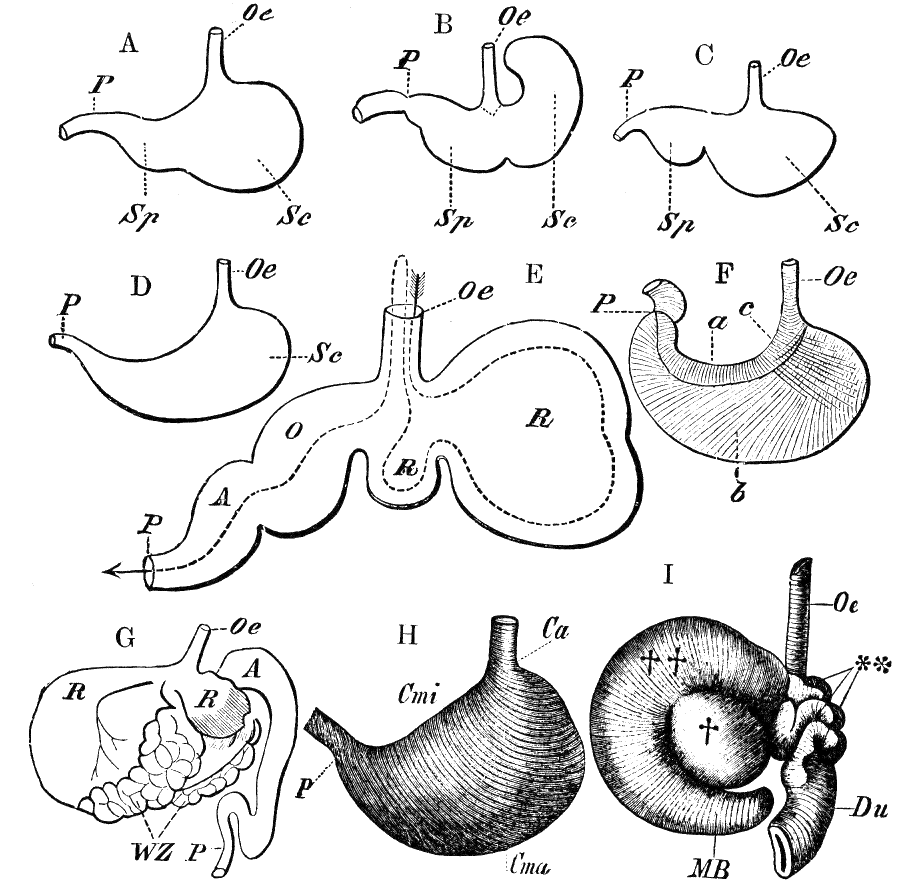
Different forms of the stomach in mammals. A, dog; B, Mus decumanus; C, Mus musculus; D, weasel; E, scheme of the ruminant stomach, the arrow with the dotted line showing the course taken by the food; F, human stomach. a, minor curvature; b, major curvature; c, cardiac end G, camel; H, Echidna aculeata. Cma, major curvature; Cmi, minor curvature. I, Bradypus tridactylus Du, duodenum; MB, coecal diverticulum; **, outgrowths of duodenum; †, reticulum; ††, rumen. A (in E and G), abomasum; Ca, cardiac division; O, psalterium; Oe, oesophagus; P, pylorus; R (to the right in E and to the left in G), rumen; R (to the left in E and to the right in G), reticulum; Sc, cardiac division; Sp, pyloric division; WZ, water-cells. (from Wiedersheim's Comparative Anatomy)

Food digestion in the simple stomach of nonruminant animals versus ruminants

The primary difference between ruminants and nonruminants is that ruminants' stomachs have four compartments:

1. rumen—primary site of microbial fermentation
2. reticulum
3. omasum—receives chewed cud, and absorbs volatile fatty acids
4. abomasum—true stomach

The first two chambers are the rumen and the reticulum. These two compartments make up the fermentation vat and are the major site of microbial activity. Fermentation is crucial to digestion because it breaks down complex carbohydrates, such as cellulose, and enables the animal to use them. Microbes function best in a warm, moist, anaerobic environment with a temperature range of 37.7 to 42.2 °C (99.9 to 108.0 °F) and a pH between 6.0 and 6.4. Without the help of microbes, ruminants would not be able to use nutrients from forages. The food is mixed with saliva and separates into layers of solid and liquid material. Solids clump together to form the cud or bolus.

The cud is then regurgitated and chewed to completely mix it with saliva and to break down the particle size. Smaller particle size allows for increased nutrient absorption. Fiber, especially cellulose and hemicellulose, is primarily broken down in these chambers by microbes (mostly bacteria, as well as some protozoa, fungi, and yeast) into the three volatile fatty acids (VFAs): acetic acid, propionic acid, and butyric acid. Protein and nonstructural carbohydrate (pectin, sugars, and starches) are also fermented. Saliva is very important because it provides liquid for the microbial population, recirculates nitrogen and minerals, and acts as a buffer for the rumen pH. The type of feed the animal consumes affects the amount of saliva that is produced.

Though the rumen and reticulum have different names, they have very similar tissue layers and textures, making it difficult to visually separate them. They also perform similar tasks. Together, these chambers are called the reticulorumen. The degraded digesta, which is now in the lower liquid part of the reticulorumen, then passes into the next chamber, the omasum. This chamber controls what is able to pass into the abomasum. It keeps the particle size as small as possible in order to pass into the abomasum. The omasum also absorbs volatile fatty acids and ammonia.

After this, the digesta is moved to the true stomach, the abomasum. This is the gastric compartment of the ruminant stomach. The abomasum is the direct equivalent of the monogastric stomach, and digesta is digested here in much the same way. This compartment releases acids and enzymes that further digest the material passing through. This is also where the ruminant digests the microbes produced in the rumen. Digesta is finally moved into the small intestine, where the digestion and absorption of nutrients occurs. The small intestine is the main site of nutrient absorption. The surface area of the digesta is greatly increased here because of the villi that are in the small intestine. This increased surface area allows for greater nutrient absorption. Microbes produced in the reticulorumen are also digested in the small intestine. After the small intestine is the large intestine. The major roles here are breaking down mainly fiber by fermentation with microbes, absorption of water (ions and minerals) and other fermented products, and also expelling waste. Fermentation continues in the large intestine in the same way as in the reticulorumen.

Only small amounts of glucose are absorbed from dietary carbohydrates. Most dietary carbohydrates are fermented into VFAs in the rumen. The glucose needed as energy for the brain and for lactose and milk fat in milk production, as well as other uses, comes from nonsugar sources, such as the VFA propionate, glycerol, lactate, and protein. The VFA propionate is used for around 70% of the glucose and glycogen produced and protein for another 20% (50% under starvation conditions).

== Abundance, distribution, and domestication ==
Wild ruminants number at least 75 million and are native to all continents except Antarctica and Australia. Nearly 90% of all species are found in Eurasia and Africa. Species inhabit a wide range of climates (from tropic to arctic) and habitats (from open plains to forests).

The population of domestic ruminants is greater than 3.5 billion, with cattle, sheep, and goats accounting for about 95% of the total population. Goats were domesticated in the Near East c. 8000 BC. Most other species were domesticated by 2500 BC., either in the Near East or southern Asia.

== Ruminant physiology ==
Ruminating animals have various physiological features that enable them to survive in nature. One feature of ruminants is their continuously growing teeth. During grazing, the silica content in forage causes abrasion of the teeth. This is compensated for by continuous tooth growth throughout the ruminant's life, as opposed to humans or other nonruminants, whose teeth stop growing after a particular age. Most ruminants do not have upper incisors; instead, they have a thick dental pad to thoroughly chew plant-based food. Another feature of ruminants is the large ruminal storage capacity that gives them the ability to consume feed rapidly and complete the chewing process later. This is known as rumination, which consists of the regurgitation of feed, rechewing, resalivation, and reswallowing. Rumination reduces particle size, which enhances microbial function and allows the digesta to pass more easily through the digestive tract.

Unlike camelids, ruminants copulate in a standing position and are not induced ovulators.

== Rumen microbiology ==
Vertebrates lack the ability to hydrolyse the beta [1–4] glycosidic bond of plant cellulose due to the lack of the enzyme cellulase. Thus, ruminants completely depend on the microbial flora present in the rumen (within the foregut), or to a lesser degree the hindgut, to digest cellulose. Digestion of food in the rumen is primarily carried out by the rumen microflora, which contains dense populations of several species of bacteria, protozoa, sometimes yeasts and other fungi – 1 ml of rumen is estimated to contain 10–50 billion bacteria and 1 million protozoa, as well as several yeasts and fungi.

Since the environment inside a rumen is anaerobic, most of these microbial species are obligate or facultative anaerobes that can decompose complex plant material, such as cellulose, hemicellulose, starch, and proteins. The hydrolysis of cellulose results in sugars, which are further fermented to acetate, lactate, propionate, butyrate, carbon dioxide, and methane.

As bacteria conduct fermentation in the rumen, they consume about 10% of the carbon, 60% of the phosphorus, and 80% of the nitrogen that the ruminant ingests. To reclaim these nutrients, the ruminant then digests the bacteria in the abomasum. The enzyme lysozyme has adapted to facilitate digestion of bacteria in the ruminant abomasum. Pancreatic ribonuclease also degrades bacterial RNA in the ruminant small intestine as a source of nitrogen.

During grazing, ruminants produce large amounts of saliva – estimates range from 100 to 150 litres of saliva per day for a cow. The role of saliva is to provide ample fluid for rumen fermentation and to act as a buffering agent. Rumen fermentation produces large amounts of organic acids, thus maintaining the appropriate pH of rumen fluids is a critical factor in rumen fermentation. After digesta passes through the rumen, the omasum absorbs excess fluid so that digestive enzymes and acid in the abomasum are not diluted.

== Tannin toxicity in ruminant animals ==
Tannins are phenolic compounds that are commonly found in plants. Found in the leaf, bud, seed, root, and stem tissues, tannins are widely distributed in many different species of plants. Tannins are separated into two classes: hydrolysable tannins and condensed tannins. Depending on their concentration and nature, either class can have adverse or beneficial effects. Tannins can be beneficial, having been shown to increase milk production, wool growth, ovulation rate, and lambing percentage, as well as reducing bloat risk and reducing internal parasite burdens.

Tannins can be toxic to ruminants, in that they precipitate proteins, making them unavailable for digestion, and they inhibit the absorption of nutrients by reducing the populations of proteolytic rumen bacteria. Very high levels of tannin intake can produce toxicity that can even cause death. Animals that normally consume tannin-rich plants can develop defensive mechanisms against tannins, such as the strategic deployment of lipids and extracellular polysaccharides that have a high affinity to binding to tannins. Some ruminants (goats, deer, elk, moose) are able to consume food high in tannins (leaves, twigs, bark) due to the presence in their saliva of tannin-binding proteins.

== Religious importance ==
The Law of Moses in the Bible allowed the eating of some mammals that had cloven hooves (i.e. members of the order Artiodactyla) and "that chew the cud", a stipulation preserved to this day in Jewish and Samaritan dietary laws, and of Christian denominations that follow the same dietary laws, such as the Ethiopian Orthodox Tewahado Church, the Seventh Day Adventists, the Sacred Name movements, the Philadelphia Church of God, and some other denominations.

== Other uses ==
The verb 'to ruminate' has been extended metaphorically to mean to ponder thoughtfully or to meditate on some topic. Similarly, ideas may be 'chewed on' or 'digested'. 'Chew the cud', or 'Chew one's cud', is to reflect or meditate. In psychology, "rumination" refers to a pattern of thinking, and is unrelated to digestive physiology.

== Ruminants and climate change ==
Methane is a strong greenhouse gas with a global warming potential of 86 compared to CO_{2} over a 20-year period. The rumen is the major site of methane production in ruminants. Methanogens within the rumen combine hydrogen and CO_{2} molecules to form methane, which is released into the atmosphere via belching.

Livestock production accounts for approximately 14.5% of total global anthropogenic greenhouse gas emissions, with cattle accounting for approximately 61.7% of these emissions. Enteric methane emissions globally have risen approximately 14% between 1990 and 2022, mainly due to increases in the number of cattle and growing demand for meat and dairy products. The meat from domestically raised ruminants has a higher carbon equivalent footprint than other meats or vegetarian sources of protein based on a global meta-analysis of lifecycle assessment studies. Methane production by meat animals, principally ruminants, is estimated 15–20% global production of methane, unless the animals were hunted in the wild. The current U.S. domestic beef and dairy cattle population is around 90 million head, approximately 50% higher than the peak wild population of American bison of 60 million head in the 1700s, which primarily roamed the part of North America that now makes up the United States.

== See also ==
- Monogastric
- Pseudoruminant
