= Foregut fermentation =

Form of digestion

Foregut fermentation is a form of digestion that occurs in the foregut of some animals such as the hamster rat, langur monkey, and the hippopotamus. It has evolved independently in several groups of mammals, and also in the hoatzin, a bird species.

Foregut fermentation is employed by ruminants and pseudoruminants, some rodents and some marsupials. It has also evolved in colobine monkeys and in sloths.

== See also ==
- Ruminant foregut fermentation
- Hindgut fermentation
- Enteric fermentation
