= Cecotrope =

Package created in the gastrointestinal tract by animals

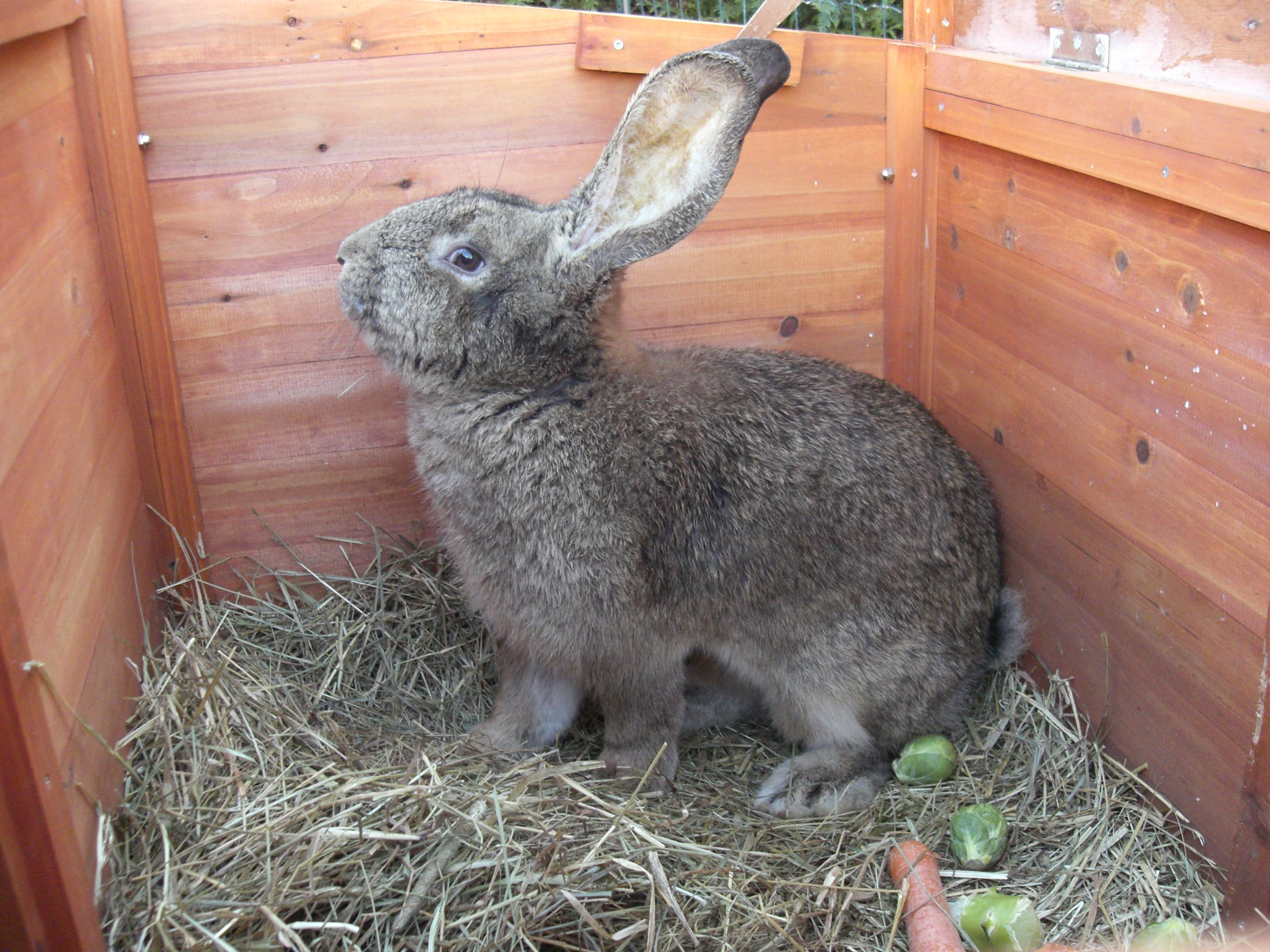

Cecotropes (also caecotropes, cecotrophs, caecotrophs, cecal pellets, soft feces, or night feces) are nutrient-filled packages created in the gastrointestinal (GI) tract that are expelled and eaten by many animals (such as rabbits, guinea pigs, mice, hamsters, and chinchillas) to obtain more nutrients from their food. Cecotropes are distinct from feces, which are composed primarily of indigestible components.

When food passes through the GI tract the first time, the stomach and the small intestine digest the food material, absorbing simple sugars, fats, and amino acids. As the undigested material moves into the colon, the food particles are sorted by size. The smaller particles of fiber are moved into the cecum where they are fermented by microbes. This creates nutrients which are generally not absorbed well in the colon, but are stored and expelled in cecotropes, including short-chain fatty acids, vitamin B, sodium, potassium, and amino acids. The nutrients from the ingested cecotropes are absorbed in the small intestine.

Lagomorphs (a group including rabbits, hares, and pikas) are perhaps the most well-known for producing and eating cecotropes, but other monogastric fermenters, such as rodents, also produce cecotropes. Rodents including beavers, guinea pigs, mice, hamsters, and chinchillas are known cecotrophs. Other animals also eat cecotropes, such as the common ringtail possum and the coppery ringtail possum.

The act of eating cecotropes is referred to as cecotrophy, which is distinct from coprophagy, which is the eating of feces proper. Similarly, cecotropes are not fecal material, so terms such as "soft feces" and "night feces" are technically incorrect. Though cecotropes are sometimes called "night feces," they are produced throughout the day and night.

== Description ==
A cecotrope is a group of small balls clumped together that looks like a thin blackberry, which exits the anus all at once. Cecotropes are dark, odorous, sticky and full of nutrition. They differ from regular feces which are larger, exit the anus one at a time, smell only slightly, have very little moisture, and are a waste product.

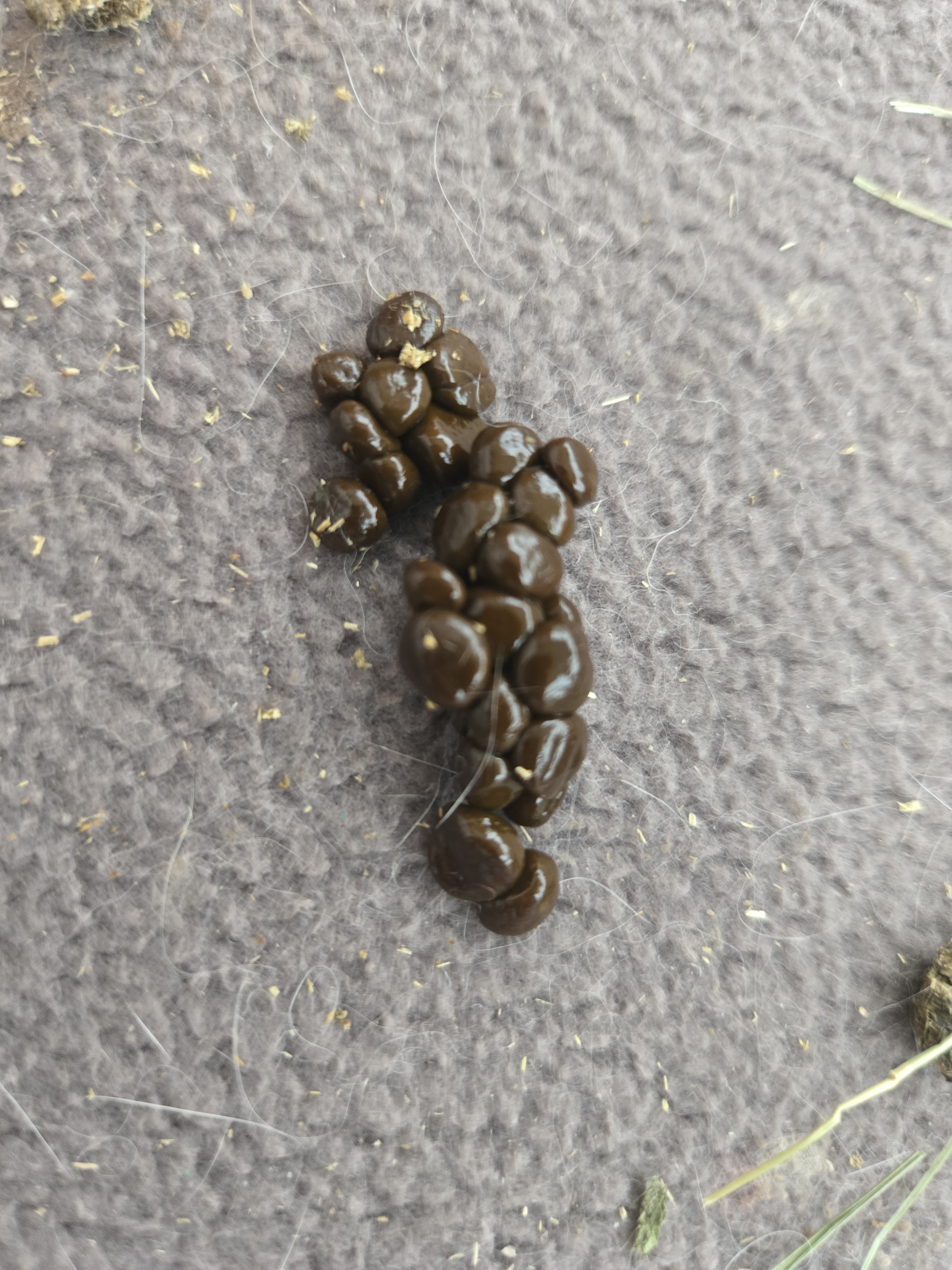
Cecotrope

== Development of cecotropes ==
Many cecotrophs, such as rabbits, are monogastric digesters and herbivores. The majority of food absorption occurs in the small intestine, which makes up roughly 12% of the GI tract in rabbits. Any material not yet digested enters the proximal colon. In lagomorphs, a unique structure called the fusus coli separates the proximal and distal colon and regulates the separation of food material. Food particles greater than 0.3 to 0.5 millimeters (mm) are pushed down the colon through peristalsis. These larger particles consist of mostly non-fermentable materials. Meanwhile particles less than 0.3 to 0.5 mm, which predominantly consist of fermentable fibers and proteins, are moved back into the colon and cecum through retrograde peristalsis. The ileocecal valve located at the end of the small intestine ensures the material goes to the cecum and not the small intestine.

Mammalian enzymes cannot break down fiber. However, microbes in the cecum have enzymes that are capable of breaking down fiber. The microbes in a rabbit's gut include bacteria (such as the genera Bacteroides, Bifidobacterium, Clostridium, Streptococcus, and Enterobacter, among others) protozoa, and yeasts.

The anaerobic fermentation in the cecum breaks down the fiber into useable food for the animal. It is also used as food for the proliferating microbes. The results of the fermentation are volatile fatty acids (VFAs), all of the B vitamins, vitamin K, microbial proteins, essential amino acids and minerals.

Some of the other nutrients are also absorbed by the cecum and the colon. Four to nine hours after a meal, the cecum empties and the contents, which containing the results of fermentation along with microbes, continue down the colon.

The material from the cecum is formed into cecotropes in the fusus coli, where it contracts more gently than when forming regular feces. Goblet cells in the fusus coli secrete mucus which covers the cecotropes, protecting them from the acidity of the stomach. The enzyme lysozyme also aids in the digestion of microbial proteins. Cecotropes continue through the colon and rectum and are expelled through the anus about eight hours after eating.

== Reingestion ==
Cecotropes are eaten directly from the anus. They usually do not touch the ground. They are not chewed; instead, they are swallowed whole so the mucus is not disturbed. They are held in the fundic region of the stomach for 3 to 6 hours, where they continue to ferment. Once that is complete, they move into the small intestine where the nutrients are absorbed, about 17 hours after the original meal.

== Benefits of cecotrophy ==
=== Nutrient reabsorption ===
Many herbivores have a diet that is low in nutrition and high in fiber (which is a non-starch polysaccharide carbohydrate). Fiber can be either soluble (pectins and gums) or insoluble (cellulose, hemicellulose and lignocellulose). A simple gastrointestinal tract is not capable of extracting enough nutrients for these animals.

One strategy to get the needed nutrition is used by ruminants, in which they chew cud in order to process their food a second time. Another strategy used by horses is to have an elongated colon to increase the time spent during digestion and absorption. Both of these strategies add substantial bulk to the animal.

Since the rabbit is a prey animal, it must be nimble to outrun its many predators. Creating and consuming cecotropes is a way to get more nutrients out of their food without adding a lot of bulk to their GI tract (which is 10% - 20% of their body weight). Since their colons do not absorb the nutrients in the cecotropes, they reingest them so they can be absorbed in the small intestine.

=== Obtaining gut microbiota ===
The process of cecotrophy begins when a rabbit is a newborn. Since the gastrointestinal tract of newborn rabbits is sterile and contains no microbes, the kits consume their mothers' cecotropes and feces to obtain microbes needed to build their cecum's microbial community. Once the kit is around 20 days of age, they begin to consume their own cecotropes.

== Disorder ==
It is essential to maintain a balanced microbiome in the gastrointestinal tract, especially the cecum. If beneficial microbes decrease and harmful microbes proliferate, the microbiome becomes unbalanced, which is called dysbiosis. The cause of this includes a diet too high in carbohydrates and/or too low in indigestible fiber; toxins; some medications such as antibiotics; dehydration; extreme stress; dental disease and other systemic diseases (e.g., liver or kidney disease). If the balance is not maintained, there can be multiple health issues, including GI stasis, which can lead to pain, stress and death.

A few cecotropes left on the ground of the living area of the animal is not cause for concern. However, if a large amount is found on the ground or stuck to the fur, a veterinarian should be consulted. Possible causes are poor diet, dental issues, arthritis, very large dewlap, obesity, or too-long fur in the anal region.

If the cecotropes are similar to pudding in consistency, it is called intermittent soft cecotropes (ISC). This is different from true diarrhea, which has no form, is completely watery and is very serious. If regular feces are also produced, it is not diarrhea.

ISC will stick to the hindquarters and feet of the animal and to places in the living area. Causes are a poor diet (too many carbohydrates, too little fiber) or inappropriate antibiotics. Treatment is to feed unlimited grass hay, greens and limited pellets and to stop giving inappropriate antibiotics.
