= Archaeomerycidae =

Archaeomerycidae Temporal range: Middle-Late Eocene 48.6–37.2 Ma

Scientific classification
- Kingdom: Animalia
- Phylum: Chordata
- Class: Mammalia
- Order: Artiodactyla
- Infraorder: Tragulina
- Family: †Archaeomerycidae; Simpson, 1945

Genera
- †Archaeomeryx; †Indomeryx; †Irrawadymeryx (?); †Notomeryx; †Paukkaungmeryx; †Thandaungia; †Xinjiangmeryx

Family of extinct artiodactyls

Archaeomerycidae is a family of extinct artiodactyls within the group Tragulina, all members of the family are found in Asian deposits during the Eocene. Members of the family are generally described as some of, if not the most basal ruminants due to their limb anatomy and dentition. Similar to early artiodactyls, these small ungulates were small with long tails and more basal foot morphology. Multiple genera in the family have been described to have been under 2 kilograms (4.4 lb). Due to the fragmentary remains of the taxa assigned to the group, it has been suggested that the family as a whole could be paraphyletic and just represent a collection of more basal Asian ruminants.

== History and classification ==
The type genus, Archaeomeryx, would first be described by Matthew and Granger in 1925 based on multiple specimens from the Shara Murun Formation collected by the American Natural History Museum. Since this original publication, the taxonomic affinity of the genus and the family at larger would be questioned in later papers. Both the original authors along with Colbert would place the genus within Hypertragulidae with a paper by Scott in 1940 questioning this placement within his monography. Even with this being the case, authors would still refer the genus to Hypertragulidae even after Simpson would place the genus within its own family in 1945. A shift towards the more recent understanding of the family would start in 1980 when Archaeomeryx would be mentioned as not a member of Hypertragulidae but an early member of Leptomerycidae. This shift would continue throughout the 1980's when the genus would be placed outside of both families it had previously been placed in with a paper by Moyà-Solà in 1988 even suggesting the genus was not actually a runinant. More recent papers, such the 2002 paper by Vislobokova and Trofimov, suggest that Archaeomerycidae is one of if not the most basal group of Tragulina. This largely comes from the aspects of the dentition along with features of the limbs.

=== Possibility of paraphyly ===
Suggestions of the family being paraphyletic were first put forward by Métais and Vislobokova in 2007, mainly in the context of the inclusion of Irrawadymeryx within the family. Other publications such as one published by Ducrocq et al. in 2023 have also echoed this concept with the inclusion of Paukkaungmeryx. A reason for this possible paraphyly was brought up in Ducrocq et al. 2020 which brought up that a majority of the diagnostic characters including all of the postcranial characters are based on those seen in the type genus. Along with this, the publication would bring attention to the fact that all of the genera assigned to the family are ruminants that all tend to have more primitive dentition than others in Asia.

== Description ==
=== Skull ===
Members of Archaeomerycidae were small ruminants with some genera such Paukkaungmeryx being suggested to have a body mass of 1.5 kilograms (3.3 lb). Their skulls were narrow with small orbits positioned at the center of the skull's length. The skull also possesses strongly developed sagittal, occipital, and temporal crests with the temporal crests being fused and arched towards their front. The parts of the skull associated with the ears are generally small with the auditory meatus being very short. The zygomatic bones bend downwards, with the bone almost reaching the tooth row ventrally and possessing a long temporal process and short lacrimal process. The nasal cavity of the family is very different from other ruminants due to the combination of the premaxilla overlapping the long nasals along with the lack of a protrusion above the opening. The bones near the anterior end of the skull are short and more similar to more basal members of the order, being generally low. The mandible of archaeomerycids is strongly curved with a well developed coronoid process. Towards the back of the mandible, there was also a narrow projection pointing backwards.

The full dentition, similar to the complete skull, is only known from the type genus which has a tooth formula of 3. 1. 3. 3.3. 1. 4. 3 though the exact dental formula does differ between genera. One example of this is the genus Xinjiangmeryx which is thought to have lost its p1 along with potentially its upper incisors. The presence of upper incisors most genera in the family is something that sets it apart from their living relatives who lack these teeth. However, the upper incisors were reduced and overall smaller that the lower ones. The lower incisors are described to be placed in a fan-like shape with the innermost teeth being larger than the outer ones. The upper canines were small and procumbent, similar to the upper incisors of some rodents, while the lower canines are similar in morphology to the incisors though a bit longer. Similar to the presence of upper incisors, most members of the group also differ from the rest of ruminants by still processing a p1. Similar to the teeth as a whole, the enamel of archaeomerycids is a much more basal, likely being similar to what would have been seen in the ancestor to ruminants today.

=== Postcranium ===
The postcranium of Archaeomerycidae is only preserved in specimens of Archaeomeryx which shows a similar general body form to dichobunids and other earlier groups of artiodactyls. Like these other groups, archaeomerycids had a long tail unlike the ruminants today. There are also a number of features different than in other ruminants that is largely seen in the limb bones. The lower limb bones on the front and hind limbs such and the radius and ulna are unfused in contrast to other ruminants which have those bones fused. Though unfused, the fibula is very reduced compared to the tibia. Along with this, the first metacarpal along with the trapezium bone are present. The manus of archaeomerycids is more similar to basal eutherian mammals due to the presence of five toes on the forelimbs. Unlike the front limbs, the hind limbs would have most likely only had four toes with the first metatarsal most likely being lost.

== Paleobiology ==
Archaeomerycids as a whole have been suggested to be herbivores, though much more omnivorous than other herbivores with this being brought up more recently with the genus Paukkaungmeryx which has been suggested to have been more of a generalist due to its molar morphology and in the past with Archaeomeryx. Based on the type genus, members of the family had senses overall similar to modern mouse deer but with some differences. They generally are thought to have a better sense of smell but worse vision and hearing than their modern relatives. These small ungulates would have also been very cursorial with the 2002 by Vislobokova and Trofimov even suggesting adaptions towards leaping. The overall gait of the animal was more comparable to some rodents and marsupials where after leaving the ground when jumping, the hind limbs will move forward. In contrast to the hindlimbs which would have pushed the animal forwards, the forelimbs would have more likely acted as shock absorbers when the animal would land. These differences in diet, sensory, and locomotion have bought up more comparisons with the genus Didelphis rather than modern ruminants. Archaeomerycids have also been thought to have been at least partially gregarious.

It has been suggested that the spread of the family, if it is a monophyletic group, is associated with the decrease in humidity in parts of Asia during the Eocene. The climate that they were most commonly associated with would have still been subtropical but still less humid than in the Paleocene.
