= Pseudoruminant =

Classification of animals

Pseudoruminant is a classification of animals based on their digestive tract differing from the ruminants. Hippopotami and camels are ungulate mammals with a three-chambered stomach (ruminants have a four-chambered stomach) while equids (horses, asses, zebras) and rhinoceroses are monogastric herbivores.

== Anatomy ==
Like ruminants, some pseudoruminants may use foregut fermentation to break down cellulose in fibrous plant species (while most others are hindgut fermenters with a large cecum). But they have three-chambered stomachs (while others are monogastric) as opposed to ruminant stomachs which have four compartments.

== Species ==
Pseudoruminant	Image	Genus	Weight
Common hippopotamus		Hippopotamus	1.5 to 3.0 tons
Horse		Equus	380 to 999 kg
One-horned rhinoceros		Rhinoceros	1.8 to 2.7 tons
Rabbit		Oryctolagus	1 to 2.5 kg

== See also ==
- Traditional ruminant
