= Monogastric =

Digestive tract with just one stomach

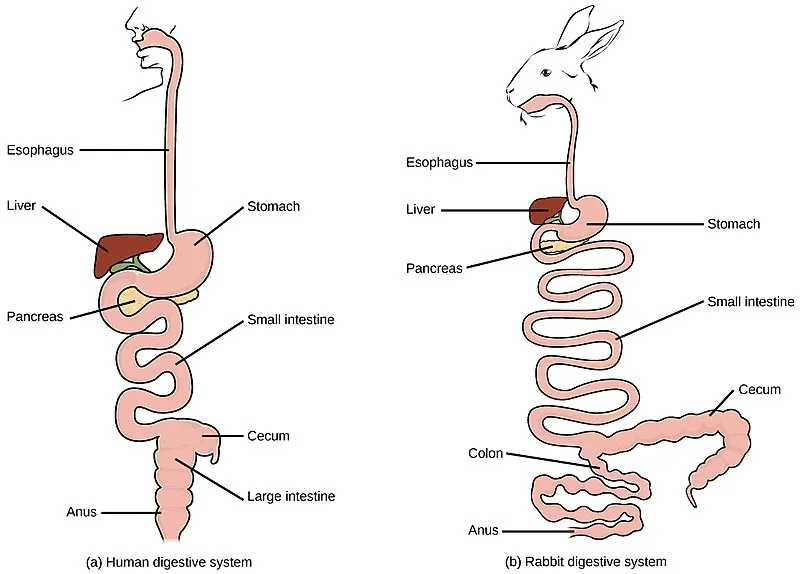
This diagram shows the monogastric digestive system of a human and rabbit. Notice the difference in cecum size between the two species.

A monogastric organism defines one of the many types of digestive tracts found among different species of animals. The defining feature of a monogastric is that it has a simple single-chambered stomach (one stomach). A monogastric can be classified as an herbivore, an omnivore (facultative carnivore), or a carnivore (obligate carnivore). Herbivores have a plant-based diet, omnivores have a plant and meat-based diet, and carnivores only eat meat. Examples of monogastric herbivores include horses, rabbits, and guinea pigs. Examples of monogastric omnivores include humans, pigs, and hamsters. Furthermore, there are monogastric carnivores such as cats and seals.

A monogastric digestive tract is slightly different from other types of digestive tracts such as a ruminant and avian. Ruminant organisms have a four-chambered complex stomach and avian organisms have a two-chambered stomach. An example of a ruminant and avian are cattle and chickens.

== Digestive system ==
The digestive system of a monogastric is a one way tract that can be divided into two section: the foregut and the hindgut. The foregut consists of the mouth, esophagus, stomach, and small intestine. The hindgut consists of the large intestine, cecum, colon, and rectum. Each organ has its own role in the break down and digestion of food consumed by the animal.

=== Foregut ===
The digestive system and foregut start in the mouth. The mouth is in charge of the simplest form of break down of food throughout the digestion process. The mouth masticates, commonly known as chewing, food taken in by the organism. Saliva produced by the salivary glands within the mouth helps further break down the food with enzymes and aids the organism in swallowing. Amylase is an example of an enzyme found within many monogastric omnivore's saliva to help break down starches. Once food is swallowed, food travels down the esophagus. The esophagus does not participate in any food break down. Its main function is to perform contractions called peristalsis to push food towards the stomach. Located at the end of the esophagus is the lower esophageal sphincter, which keeps stomach acid from flowing into the esophagus. Animals such as horses and rabbits cannot vomit due to this strong muscle.

The stomach follows the esophagus and contains several muscles, acid, and enzymes. Its main function is to further break down food into a substance that is digestible for the small intestine. The lower muscles in the stomach mix the food with stomach acid. Stomach acid is made up of mainly hydrochloric acid (HCl), which has a pH of around 1.0 to 2.5. The acidity of stomach acid denatures consumed proteins, which helps digestive enzymes break down peptide bonds within the molecules. An example of this enzyme is pepsin.

The last organ in the foregut is the small intestine. The small intestine, like the esophagus, uses peristalsis to push food through the tract. It contains three parts: the duodenum, jejunum, ileum. The duodenum takes the partially digested food from the stomach and further breaks it down into digestible nutrients such as carbohydrates, lipids, and vitamins. The jejunum and ileum are responsible for absorbing most of the nutrients that pass through the digestive system. These sections contain a large number of villi that increase the surface area of the intestinal lining and help absorb the broken down nutrients.

=== Hindgut ===
The hindgut begins right after the small intestine and begins with the cecum, which is the first part of the large intestine. The cecum within monogastric animals can vary drastically. Carnivores contain a small cecum, while herbivores contain a large one due to their need of fermentation. The function of the cecum in monogastric carnivores and some omnivores is water and salt absorption. The cecum plays a much bigger role in monogastric herbivores that need a way to ferment cellulose for energy. Horses for example ferment their carbohydrates in the cecum and large intestine with the help of microbes, which makes them hindgut fermenters. This is opposed to foregut fermenters, or ruminants.

The large intestine is responsible for absorbing water into the bloodstream and turning leftover waste into stool. Waste includes large nutrient particles, dead cells, and other fluid. Bacteria in the large intestine break down some of the remaining nutrients in the food, while some vitamin and minerals continue to be absorbed. Peristalsis is used to push the stool into the rectum. The colon is similar to the large intestine. Its main function is forming stool and absorbing water. The rectum holds stool until its ready to be released through the anus. This is the last organ in the monogastric digestive system.
