= Cud =

Food regurgitated so it can be chewed further

Cud is a portion of food that returns from a ruminant's stomach to the mouth to be chewed for the second time. More precisely, it is a bolus of semi-degraded food regurgitated from the reticulorumen of a ruminant. Cud is produced during the physical digestive process of rumination.

== Rumination ==
A water buffalo chewing cud

The alimentary canal of ruminants, such as cattle, giraffes, goats, sheep, alpacas, and antelope, are unable to produce the enzymes required to break down the cellulose and hemicellulose of plant matter. Accordingly, these animals rely on a symbiotic relationship with a wide range of microbes, which largely reside in the reticulorumen, and which can synthesize the requisite enzymes. The reticulorumen thus hosts a microbial fermentation which yields products (mainly volatile fatty acids and microbial protein), which the ruminant is able to digest and absorb. This allows the animals to extract nutritional value from cellulose which is usually undigested.

The process of rumination is stimulated by the presence of roughage in the upper part of the reticulorumen. The chest cavity is stretched, forming a vacuum in the gullet that sucks the semi-liquid stomach content into the esophagus. From the esophagus it is taken back to the mouth with retro peristaltic movements. When the stomach content, or the cud, arrives in the mouth of the ruminant, it is pushed against the palate with the tongue to remove excess liquid, the latter is swallowed and the solid material is chewed thoroughly so the cattle can extract the minerals present in the cud brought to the surface during rumination. The function of rumination is that food is physically refined to expose more surface area for bacteria working in the reticulorumen, as well as stimulation of saliva secretion to buffer the rumen pH.

When food has been degraded sufficiently it passes from the reticulorumen through the reticulomasal orifice to the omasum followed by the abomasum to continue the digestion process in the lower parts of the alimentary canal. No enzymes are secreted in the rumen. Enzymes and hydrochloric acid are only secreted from the abomasum (fourth stomach) onwards, and ruminants function from that point onwards much like monogastric animals, such as pigs and humans.

== Chemistry ==
The reticulorumen has an optimum pH of 6.5 for the microbe population to thrive. Consumption by ruminants of an insufficiently fibrous diet leads to little cud formation and therefore lowered amounts of saliva production. This in turn is associated with rumen acidosis, where the rumen pH can fall to 5 or lower. Rumen acidosis is associated with a lowered appetite which leads to still lower rates of saliva secretion. Eventually, a collapse of the microbial ecosystem in the rumen will occur because of the low pH. Acute rumen acidosis can lead to death of the animal, and will occur if the animal is allowed to eat a diet with no roughage but high levels of highly digestible starchy concentrate. Some dairy cows in intensive systems of milk production may have sub-acute acidosis because of the high proportion of cereals in their diets. However, most producers provide adequate fodder in the form of hay to prevent this.

== Cuisine ==
Goat cud is sometimes an ingredient in Pinapaitan.

== See also ==
- Chymus
- Cecotrope
