= William Bulloch (bacteriologist) =

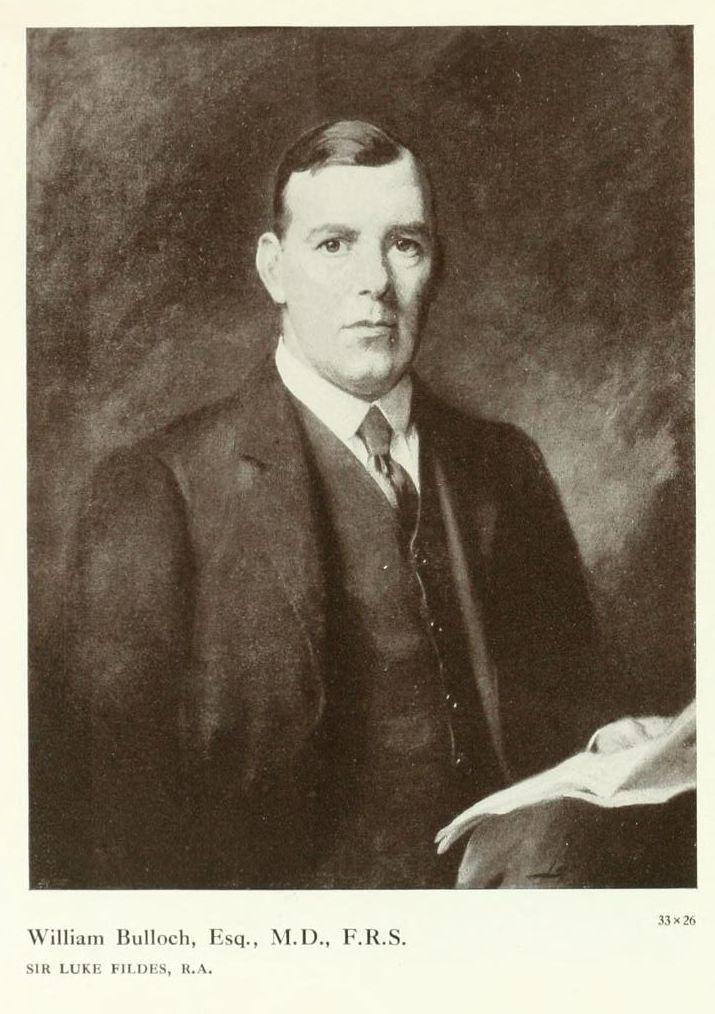

William Bulloch FRS (19 August 1868, in Aberdeen – 11 February 1941) was a British bacteriologist and historian of bacteriology.

== Life ==
After education at Old Aberdeen Grammar School (the 'Barn'), Bulloch in 1884 matriculated at the University of Aberdeen and graduated there M.B., M.Chir. in 1890. In 1890–91, he worked as an assistant in a medical practice, but then returned to the University of Aberdeen in 1891 and worked under David James Hamilton on the pathology of the mammalian nervous system. Bulloch did post-graduate work at the University of Leipzig as a voluntary assistant to Birch-Hirschfeld and also studied at Vienna. In 1894 he returned briefly to the University of Aberdeen and received the higher medical qualification Doctor of Medicine.

In 1894, Bulloch became an assistant to David Ferrier at King's College London. He was then an assistant to Victor Horsley at University College Hospital.

Bulloch studied further in Paris and Copenhagen. He returned to the UK in 1895 to become the chief bacteriologist at the British Institute for Preventive Medicine's antitoxin laboratory at Sudbury. In 1897, he was appointed to a lectureship in bacteriology at the London Hospital.

In 1917, Bulloch's position as lecturer was given the title Goldsmith's Professor of Bacteriology in the University of London. He lectured in bacteriology at the University of London from 1897 until his official retirement in 1934 but he continued to do some laboratory work after his retirement.

Bulloch chaired the governing body of the Lister Institute and was an original member of the Medical Research Council. He was the author or co-author of more than 100 publications.

== Awards and honours ==
- 1901 — Dobell Lecturer of Royal Society of Physicians
- 1913 — Fellow of the Royal Society
- 1922 — Tyndall Lecturer of the Royal Institution
- 1936 — Heath Clark Lecturer

== Selected publications ==
- The History of Bacteriology. 1938.

== Family ==
Bulloch married in 1923 Irene Adelaide Baker (née Peyman). She was the widow of Alfred Augustus Baker, a stockbroker. Her parents were Alexander Peyman, who had worked in New Zealand, and Elizabeth Ruth Walkem, daughter of Mark Walkem of Jersey, married in Melbourne in 1868. There were no children of the marriage.
