= Displaced abomasum =

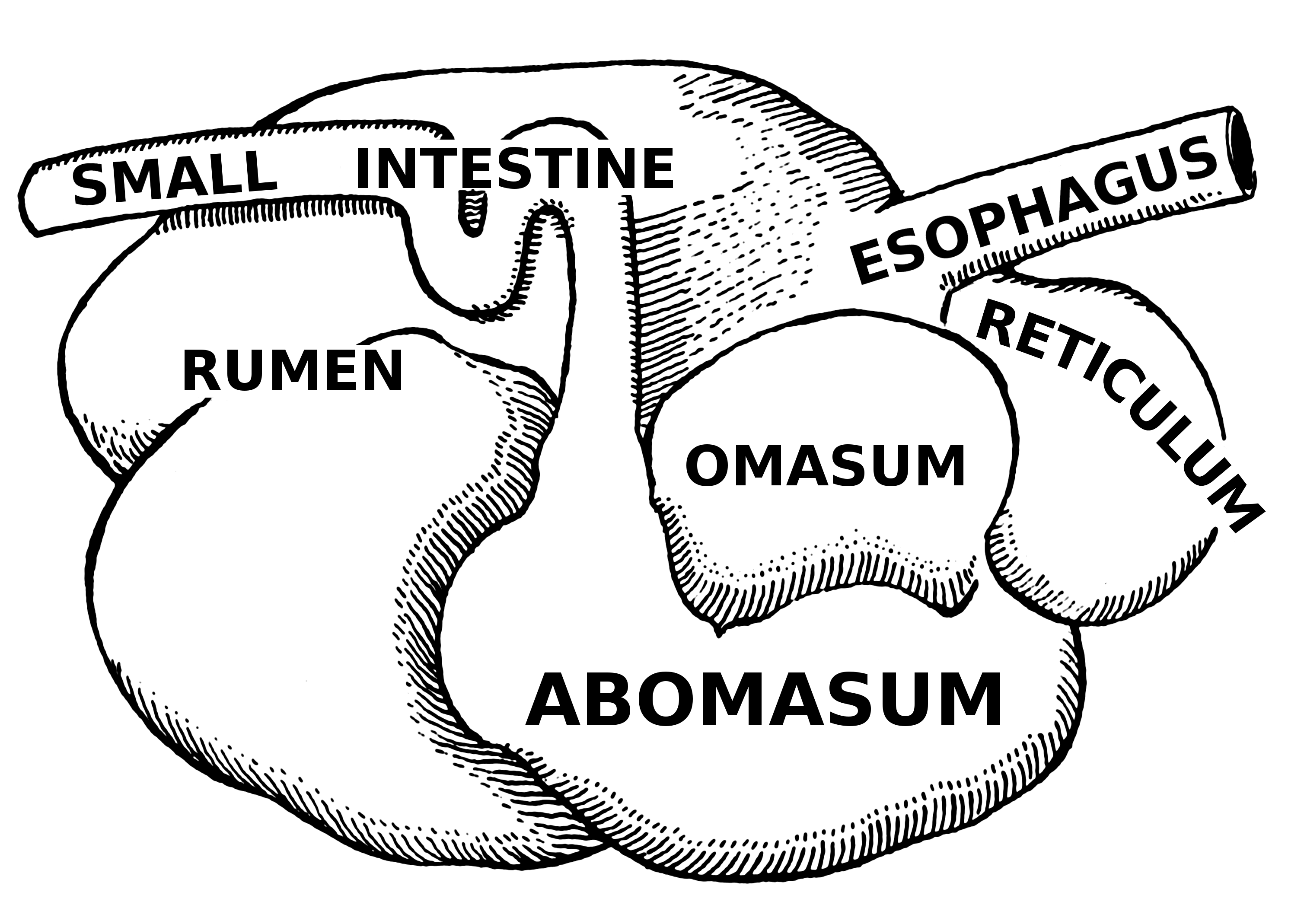
The main components of a ruminant's stomach

Displaced abomasum in cattle occurs when the abomasum, also known as the true stomach, which typically resides on the floor of the abdomen, fills with gas and rises to the top of the abdomen, where it is said to be ‘displaced’. When the abomasum moves from its normal position it prevents the natural passage of gas and feed through the digestive system, creating a restriction. As cattle are ruminants, which have a 4 chambered stomach composed of a rumen, reticulum, omasum and abomasum. Ruminants require this specialized digestive system in order to properly process and break down their high fiber and cellulose rich diets. As this type of digestive system is quite complex it is at a greater risk for incidence. Due to the natural anatomy of cattle it is more common to have the abomasum displace to the left, known as a left-displaced abomasum, than to the right, right-displaced abomasum. When the abomasum becomes displaced there also becomes a chance of an abomasal volvulus, twist, developing. An abomasal volvulus occurs when the abomasum, which is already out of place, will rotate and cut off blood and nutrient supply to the abomasum. Cattle which develop an abomasal twist require immediate vet attention to regain blood supply and food passage through the digestive system or the abomasum will begin to shut down due to lack of blood supply and toxicity development.

== Clinical signs ==
Common signs which may be noticeable early on in cattle with a displaced abomasum include:

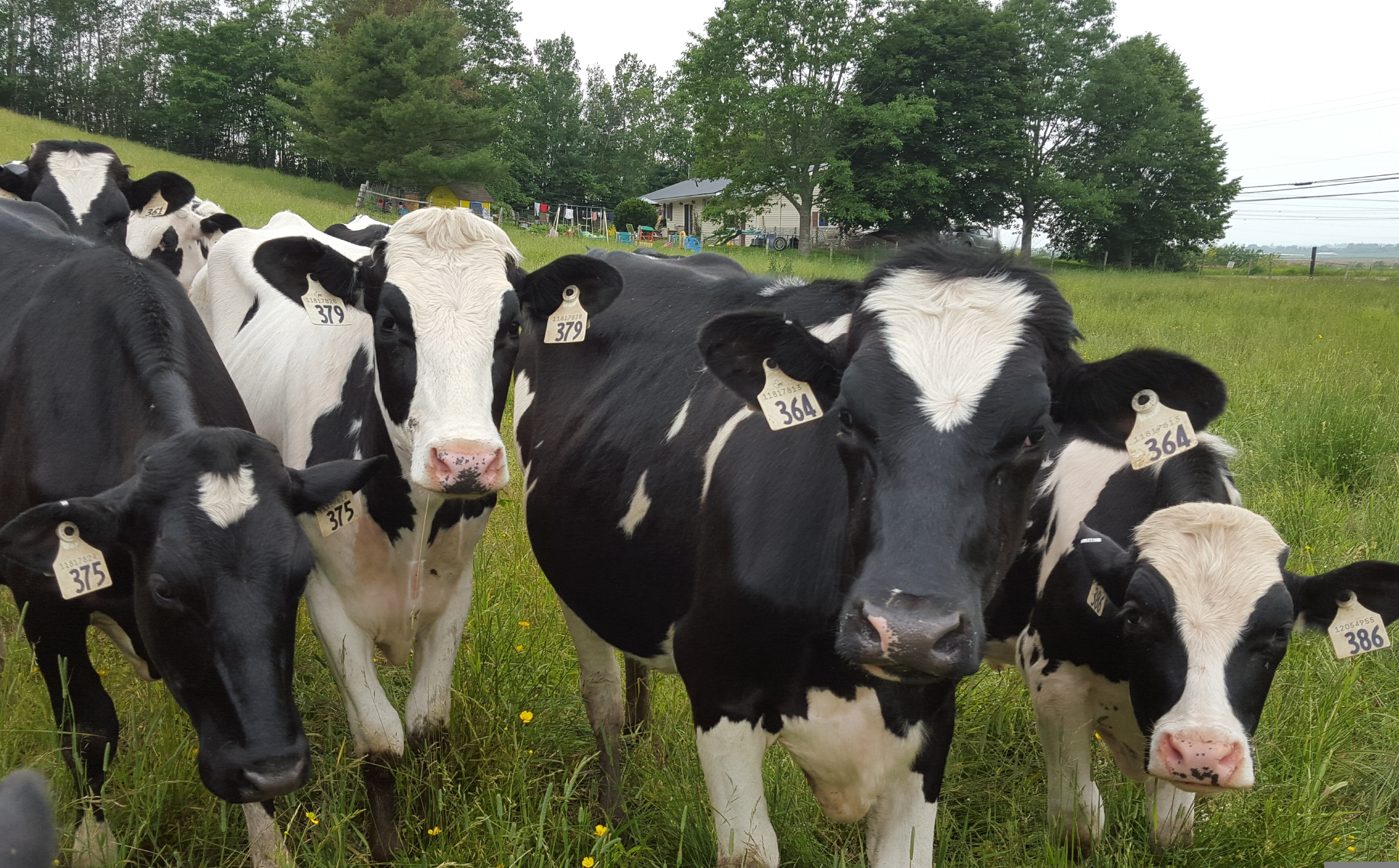
Holstein heifers on pasture prior to their first calving

- Loss of appetite
- Dehydration
- Decline in milk production
- Reduced rumination
- Mild diarrhea
- Changes in coat texture (rough)

Depending on the severity of the case, cattle may show all of the external symptoms listed above or just a few. Some animals with a slightly displaced abomasum will continue to carry out normal behavior until symptoms/complications increase. In addition, in severe cases, due to stress, some parameters, such as oxidative stress parameters, increase which could be a good indicator for diagnosis.

== Causes ==
The most probable cause of a displaced abomasum developing is associated with the process of calving and is most commonly seen within 14 days of parturition. When in gestation, due to the size of the growing calf inside the uterus, the abomasum is displaced from its original position, following calving the abomasum has to move back to its normal placement, in which this movement increases the risk of further displacement. There are other metabolic conditions which have been known to contribute to the development of a displaced abomasum, and in many cases it is high producing cows, older cows and those undergoing other stressors which are found to have developed this issue.

== Prevention ==
As there are a variety of factors which affect the likelihood of cattle developing a displaced abomasum, veterinarian recommendations have been put in place within the industry to try and reduce the prevalence of it occurring. Ensuring cattle consume an adequate, consistent diet containing a great deal of roughage following calving is essential to proper provide rumen fill and function. Maintaining a constant diet with little changes during previous late lactation and early on parturition. Through the prevention of other common metabolic diseases such as hypocalcaemia, ketosis, etc., will in turn lower the overall risk of a displaced abomasum developing as reducing the overall stress on an animal has shown reduce the incidence of all health related issues occurring.

== Treatment ==
Treatment is required for animal survival, in which a veterinarian will assess the severity of the situation and decide what the best method of treatment is. Regardless of the method of treatment used the ultimate goal is to return the abomasum to its original location to resume proper functioning.

There are two common methods of repairing a displaced abomasum:

Surgery – A much more invasive, costly and in many cases not necessary method in which the veterinarian will open up the cow's abdomen to investigate the problem where they will reposition the abomasum and put stitches in place to hold the abomasum in the desired location to prevent reoccurrence. Although this method is more invasive, it is known to have a lower risk of reoccurrence over the non-surgical option.

Toggling – Toggling in conjunction with proper rolling techniques is known as the non-surgical method of treating a displaced abomasum. In this method the veterinarian will make the cow lie down where it can be rolled until the abomasum returns to its original location and at that time a toggle is inserted into the abdomen to fix the abomasum in place using stitches. Inserting a toggle in addition to rolling has shown significant reduction in the abomasum relapsing. Although this method is less invasive it requires proper training and set-up in order to carry out this procedure on farm as it requires more space than surgery.
