= Felix Jacob Marchand =

German pathologist

- Born: 22 October 1823; Halle an der Saale, Province of Saxony, Kingdom of Prussia
- Died: 4 February 1928 (aged 81); Leipzig, Germany
- Scientific career
- Fields: pathologist
- Workplaces: Giessen

Felix Jacob Marchand (22 October 1846 – 4 February 1928) was a German pathologist born in Halle an der Saale.

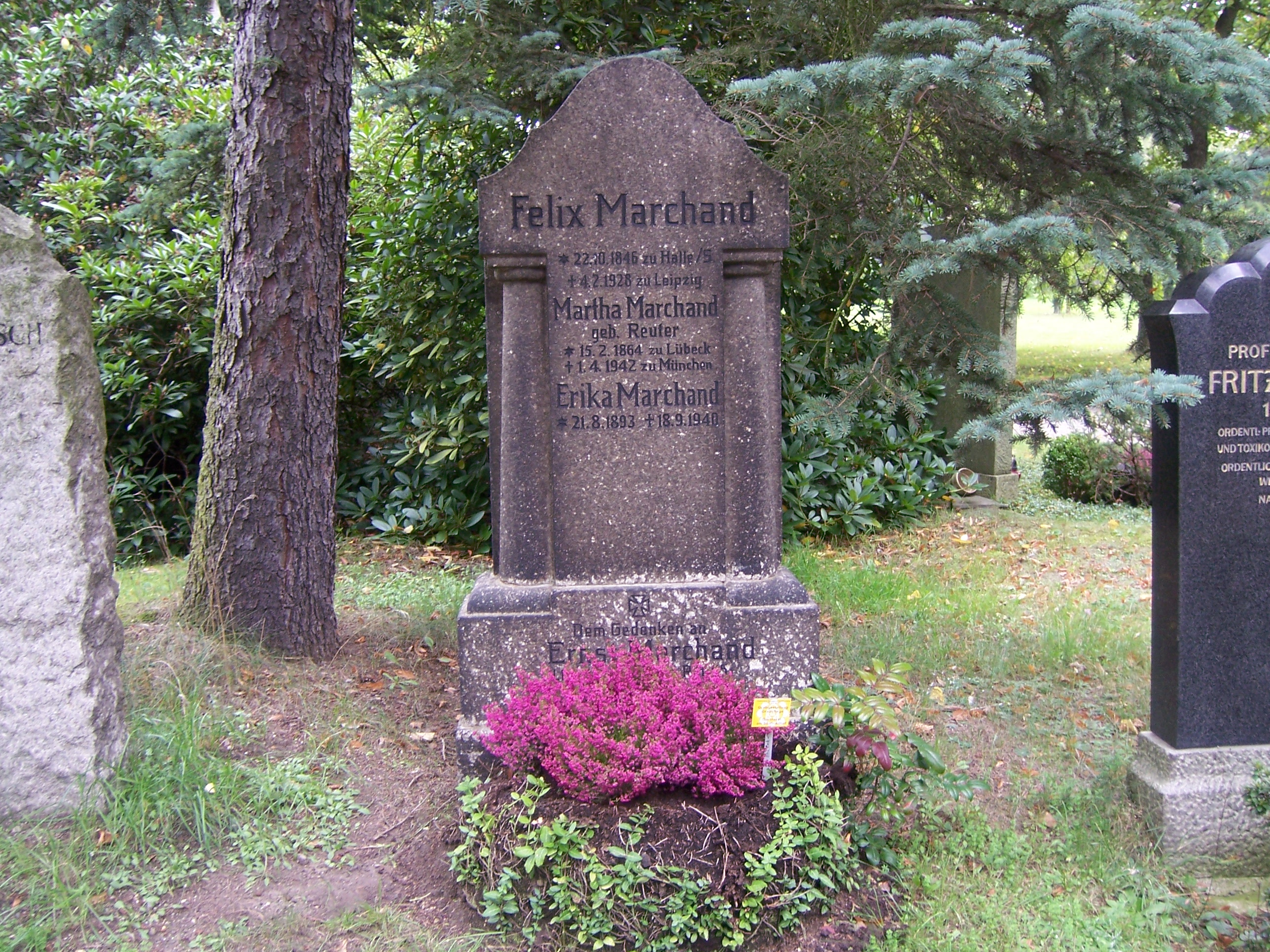
Gravesite of Felix Marchand at the Südfriedhof in Leipzig.

He studied medicine in Berlin, and later became an assistant at the pathological institute in Halle. In 1881 he became a professor of pathological anatomy in Giessen, and two years later garnered the same position at Marburg. In 1900 he succeeded pathologist Felix Victor Birch-Hirschfeld (1842–1899) at the University of Leipzig.

In 1904 Marchand is credited with coining the term atherosclerosis from the Greek "athero", meaning gruel, and "sclerosis", meaning hardening, to describe the fatty substance inside a hardened artery. His name is lent to the eponymous "Marchand's adrenals", which is accessory adrenal tissue in the broad ligament of the uterus.

Among his written works was a 4-volume textbook on pathology that he co-authored with Ludolf von Krehl (1861–1937), called "Handbuch der allgemeinen Pathologie".
