= Braxy =

Bacterial disease of sheep

Braxy is an infectious disease which causes sudden death in sheep. It is caused by the bacterium Clostridium septicum.

Braxy generally occurs in winter, when sheep eat frosted root crops, or frosted grass. The frozen feed damages the mucosa (lining) of the abomasum, allowing C. septicum to enter, causing abomasitis and a fatal bacteremia.

Young sheep not protected with a vaccine are most commonly affected. If sheep are not found dead, signs include abdominal pain and recumbency. There is no treatment, and sheep usually die within 36 hours of the onset of signs. The carcass of sheep which died of braxy will often decompose more rapidly than expected.

Historically, the mutton of affected sheep was also referred to as braxy.

A vaccine against braxy was developed at the Moredun Research Institute in Scotland.

Braxy has been reported in Europe (particularly in Iceland, Norway and the UK), Australia and the United States.
