= Rumen =

First compartment of ruminant stomach

The rumen, also known as a paunch, is the largest stomach compartment in ruminants. The rumen and the reticulum make up the reticulorumen in ruminant animals. The diverse microbial communities in the rumen allows it to serve as the primary site for microbial fermentation of ingested feed, which is often fiber-rich roughage typically indigestible by mammalian digestive systems. The rumen is known for containing unique microbial networks within its multiple sac compartments to break down nutrients into usable energy and fatty acids.

== Brief anatomy ==
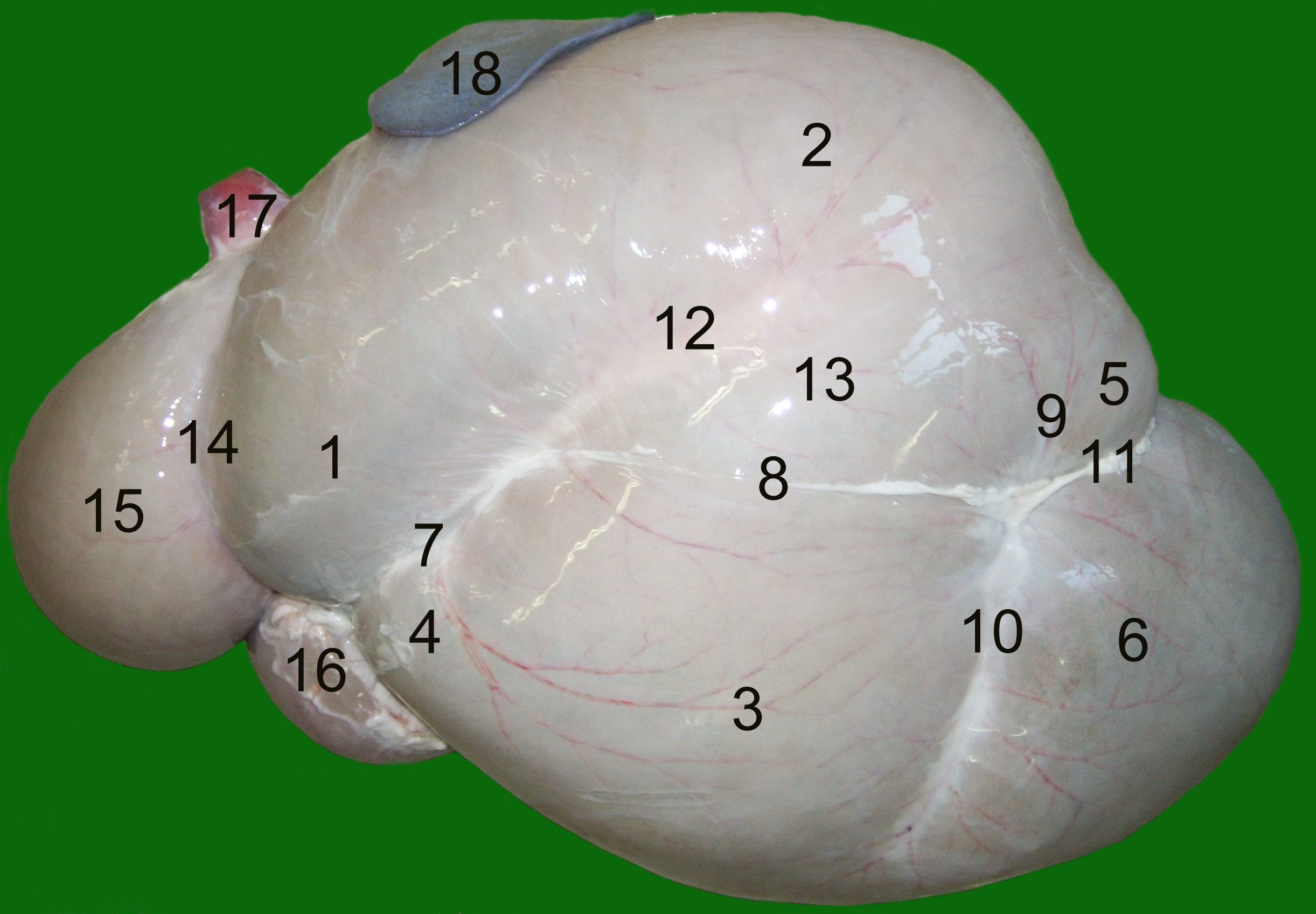
Rumen of a sheep from left. 1 Atrium ruminis, 2 Saccus dorsalis, 3 Saccus ventralis, 4 Recessus ruminis, 5 Saccus cecus caudodorsalis, 6 Saccus cecus caudoventralis, 7 Sulcus cranialis, 8 Sulcus longitudinalis sinister, 9 Sulcus coronarius dorsalis, 10 Sulcus coronarius ventralis, 11 Sulcus caudalis, 12 Sulcus accessorius sinister, 13 Insula ruminis, 14 Sulcus ruminoreticularis, 15 Reticulum, 16 Abomasum, 17 Oesophagus, 18 Spleen.

The rumen is composed of five muscular sacs: cranial sac, ventral sac, dorsal sac, caudodorsal sac, and caudoventral blind sac. Each of these areas contain unique microbial communities, environments, and physical abilities that influence digestion.

The outer lining of the rumen, known as the epithelium, serves as a protective layer and contributes to the metabolic processing of fermentation products.

The inner lining of the rumen wall is covered in small fingerlike projections called papillae, which aid in nutrient absorption. The reticulum is lined with ridges that form a hexagonal honeycomb pattern. These features increase the surface area of the reticulorumen wall, facilitating the absorption of volatile fatty acids and capture of smaller digesta particles.

The rumen and the reticulum differ with regard to the makeup of the lining but account for approximately 80% of total ruminant stomach volume.

== Digestion ==
Digestion in the rumen and reticulorumen occurs through fermentation by diverse microbe communities to optimize resources from nutrient dense feed. Millions of microorganisms, including bacteria, archaea, viruses, fungi, and protozoa, are known to reside in the reticulorumen and are essential to digest structural carbohydrates, like lignocellulose (hemicellulose and cellulose), non-structural carbohydrates (starch, sugar, and pectin), lipids, and nitrogenous compounds (proteins, peptides, and amino acids).

Both non-structural and structural carbohydrates are hydrolysed to monosaccharides or disaccharides by microbial enzymes. The resulting mono- and disaccharides are transported into the microbes. Once within microbial cell walls, the mono- and disaccharides may be assimilated into microbial biomass or fermented to volatile fatty acids (VFAs), such as acetate, propionate, butyrate, lactate, valerate and other branched-chain VFAs via glycolysis and other biochemical pathways to yield energy for the microbial cell. Most VFAs are absorbed across the reticulorumen wall, directly into the bloodstream, and are used by the ruminant as substrates for energy production and biosynthesis. Some branched chain VFAs are incorporated into the lipid membrane of rumen microbes. VFAs provide large amounts of energy for ruminants and are critical to the health of the rumen and its microbiome.

Lipids, lignin, minerals, and vitamins play a less prominent role in digestion than carbohydrates and protein, but they are still critical in many ways. Lipids are partly hydrolysed and hydrogenated, and glycerol, if present in the lipid, is fermented. Lipids are otherwise inert in the rumen. Some carbon from carbohydrate or protein may be used for de novo synthesis of microbial lipid. High levels of lipid, particularly unsaturated lipid, in the rumen are thought to poison microbes and suppress fermentation activity. Lignin, a phenolic compound, is recalcitrant to digestion, through it can be solubilized by fungi. Lignin is thought to shield associated nutrients from digestion and hence limits degradation. Minerals are absorbed by microbes and are necessary to their growth. Microbes in turn synthesize many vitamins, such as cyanocobalamin, in great quantities—often great enough to sustain the ruminant even when vitamins are highly deficient in the diet.

The protein ingested is either degradable intake protein or undegradable intake protein, or rumen bypass protein. Protein is hydrolysed to peptides and amino acids by microbial enzymes, which are subsequently transported across the microbial cell wall for assimilation into cell biomass, primarily. Peptides, amino acids, ammonia, and other sources of nitrogen originally present in the feed can also be used directly by microbes with little to no hydrolysis. In situations in which nitrogen for microbial growth is in excess, protein and its derivatives can also be fermented to produce energy, yielding ammonia. Excess ammonia is absorbed by the rumen and converted into urea in the liver. Non-amino acid nitrogen is used for synthesis of microbial amino acids.

Ruminants have access to food-sourced protein and microbial proteins produced by the microbes in the rumen. This creates a symbiotic relationship between the ruminant and the microbial communities, as the microbes can be used as a protein source when washed into the abomasum section of the digestive tract.

== Stratification and mixing of digesta ==
Digested food (digesta) in the rumen is not uniform, but rather stratified into gas, liquid, and particles of different sizes, densities, and other physical characteristics. Additionally, the digesta is subject to extensive mixing and complicated flow paths upon entry into the rumen. Though they may seem trivial at first, these complicated stratification, mixing, and flow patterns of digesta are a key aspect of digestive activity in the ruminant and thus warrant detailed discussion.

After being swallowed, food travels down the oesophagus and is deposited in the dorsal part of the reticulum. Contractions of the reticulorumen propel and mix the recently ingested feed into the ruminal mat. The mat is a thick mass of digesta, consisting of partially degraded, long, fibrous material. Most material in the mat has been recently ingested, and as such, has considerable fermentable substrate remaining. Microbial fermentation proceeds rapidly in the mat, releasing many gases. Some of these gases are trapped in the mat, causing the mat to be buoyant. As fermentation proceeds, fermentable substrate is exhausted, gas production decreases, and particles lose buoyancy due to loss of entrapped gas. Digesta in the mat hence goes through a phase of increasing buoyancy followed by decreasing buoyancy. Simultaneously, the size of digesta particles–relatively large when ingested–is reduced by microbial fermentation and, later, rumination. Incomplete digestion of plant material here will result in the formation of a type of bezoar called Phytobezoars. At a certain point, particles are dense and small enough that they may "fall" through the rumen mat into the ventral sac below, or they may be swept out of the rumen mat into the reticulum by liquid gushing through the mat during ruminal contractions. Once in the ventral sac, digesta continues to ferment at decreased rates, further losing buoyancy and decreasing in particle size. It is soon swept into the ventral reticulum by ruminal contractions.

In the ventral reticulum, less dense, larger digesta particles may be propelled up into the oesophagus and mouth during contractions of the reticulum. Digesta is chewed in the mouth in a process known as rumination, then impelled back down the oesophagus and deposited in the dorsal sac of the reticulum, to be lodged and mixed into the ruminal mat again. Denser, small particles stay in the ventral reticulum during reticular contraction, and then during the next contraction may be swept out of the reticulorumen with liquid through the reticulo-omasal orifice, which leads to the next chamber in the ruminant animal's alimentary canal, the omasum.

Water and saliva enter through the rumen to form a liquid pool. Liquid will ultimately escape from the reticulorumen from absorption through the wall, or through passing through the reticulo-omasal orifice, as digesta does. However, since liquid cannot be trapped in the mat as digesta can, liquid passes through the rumen much more quickly than digesta does. Liquid often acts as a carrier for very small digesta particles, such that the dynamics of small particles is similar to that of liquid.

The uppermost area of the rumen, the headspace, is filled with gases (such as methane, carbon dioxide, and, to a much lower degree, hydrogen) released from fermentation and anaerobic respiration of food. These gases are regularly expelled from the reticulorumen through the mouth, in a process called eructation.

== Microbes in reticulorumen ==
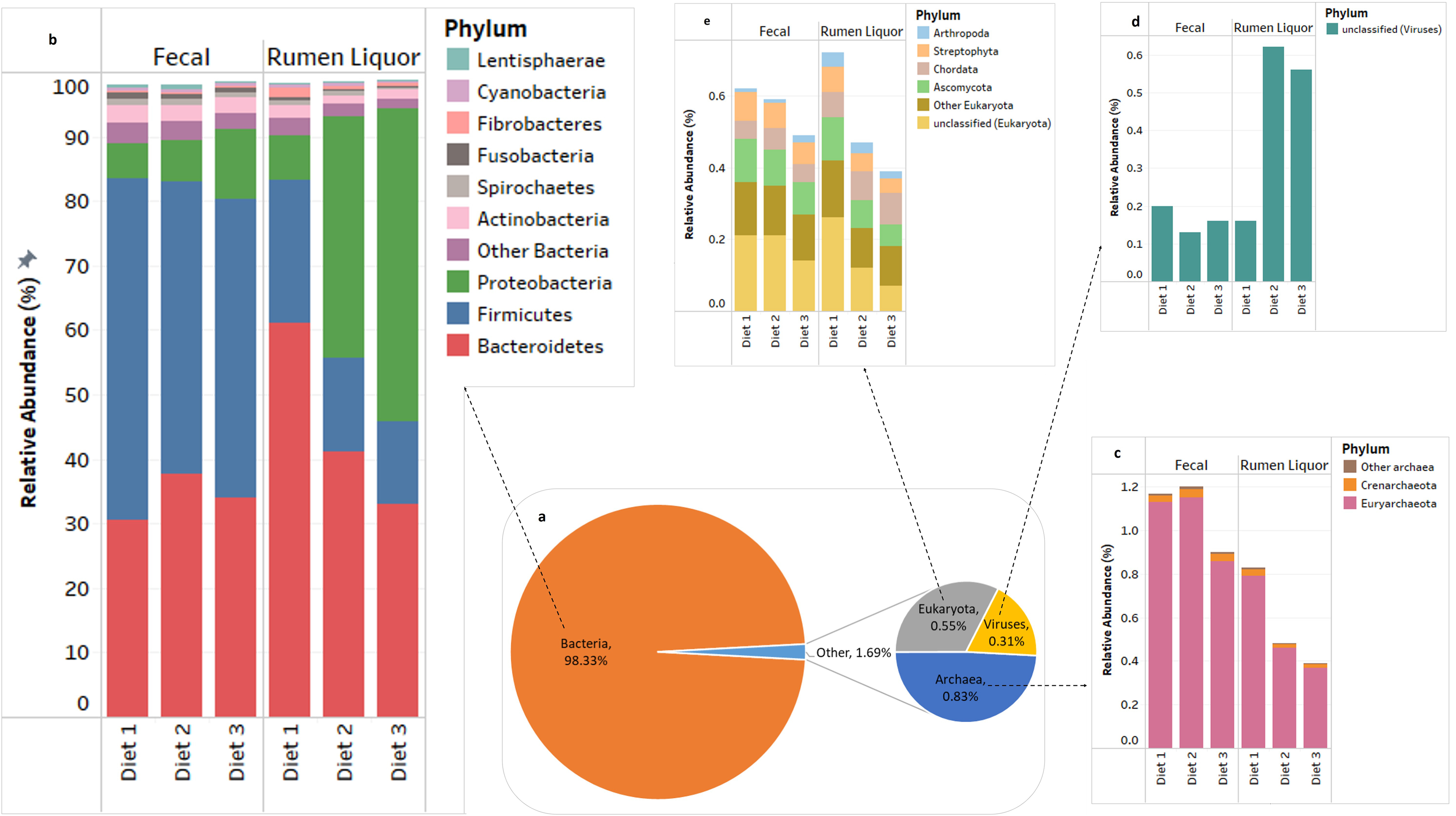
Bacteria dominate rumen microbiome; composition can change substantially with diet.

The different sacs of the rumen allow for varying ecological niches for microbes in the reticulorumen, including bacteria, protozoa, fungi, archaea, and viruses. Each microbial community depends on a variety of enzymes to breakdown lignocellulose, nonstructural carbohydrates, nitrogenous compounds, and lipids.

Bacteria, along with protozoa, are the predominant microbes and by mass account for 40-60% of total microbial matter in the rumen. They are categorized into several functional groups, such as fibrolytic, amylolytic, and proteolytic types, which preferentially digest structural carbohydrates, non-structural carbohydrates, and protein, respectively. Protozoa (40-60% of microbial mass) derive their nutrients through phagocytosis of other microbes, and degrade and digest feed carbohydrates, especially starch and sugars, and protein.

Ruminal fungi make up 5-10% of microbes and are absent on diets poor in fibre. Fungi occupy an important niche in the rumen because they hydrolyse some ester linkages between lignin and hemicellulose or cellulose, and help break down digesta particles. Archaea, approximately 3% of total microbes, are mostly autotrophic methanogens and produce methane through anaerobic respiration. Most of the hydrogen produced by bacteria, protozoa and fungi is used by these methanogens to reduce carbon dioxide to methane. Viruses are present in unknown numbers and have not been well studied. However, they can lyse microbes, releasing their contents for other microbes to assimilate and ferment in a process called microbial recycling, although recycling through the predatory activities of protozoa is quantitatively more important.

Microbes in the reticulorumen eventually flow out into the omasum and the remainder of the alimentary canal. Under normal fermentation conditions the environment in the reticulorumen is weakly acidic and is populated by microbes that are adapted to a pH between roughly 5.5 and 6.5; since the abomasum is strongly acidic (pH 2 to 4), it acts as a barrier that largely kills reticulorumen flora and fauna as they flow into it. Subsequently, microbial biomass is digested in the small intestine and smaller molecules (mainly amino acids) are absorbed and transported in the portal vein to the liver. The digestion of these microbes in the small intestine is a major source of nutrition, as microbes usually supply some 60 to 90% of the total amount of amino acids absorbed. On starch-poor diets, they also provide the predominant source of glucose absorbed from the small intestinal contents.

== Human uses ==
The feed contained within the reticulorumen, known as "paunch waste", has been studied as a fertiliser for use in sustainable agriculture.

== Development ==
At birth, the rumen organ, rumen epithelium, and rumen microbiota are not fully developed and are metabolically nonfunctional. The developing rumen does not display the level of keratinization seen in the mature organ. Generally, the most receptive time for rumen development is between the postnatal and weaning periods. Over this period, rumen organ and epithelium growth, along with the establishment of rumen microbiota, will prove to be essential to rumen development. This process is influenced by the introduction of solid food and the establishment of fermentation in the rumen. Additionally, there must be an adequate amount of short chain fatty acids, produced during fermentation, to properly develop the papillae.

Papillae growth in rumen epithelium is essential for rumen functionality. Papillae increase the surface area inside of the rumen and allow for a considerable increase in nutrient absorption inside of the rumen. Distinguishing a developed from an undeveloped rumen is simplified by observing the carpeting of tissue surrounding the interior of the rumen, as an undeveloped rumen maintains a smooth, papillae-lacking outer surface, and a developed rumen possesses thick, papillae-full walls.

Due to ruminants being born with a sterile gastrointestinal tract, the developing rumen must be exposed to an array of microflora at an early stage. Specific diets in which microflora promote an anaerobic environment suitable for fermentation in the rumen are favored. Furthermore, feeds must be tailored to the needs of the specific ruminants, as developing ruminants who have been on a strict liquid feed diet will possess different microflora when compared to that of a developing ruminant fed with a combination of a dry and liquid feed. This is due to the nutrients ingested by the animal not entering into the rumen stomach compartment, as it is instead bypassed by the reflexive closure of the esophageal groove.

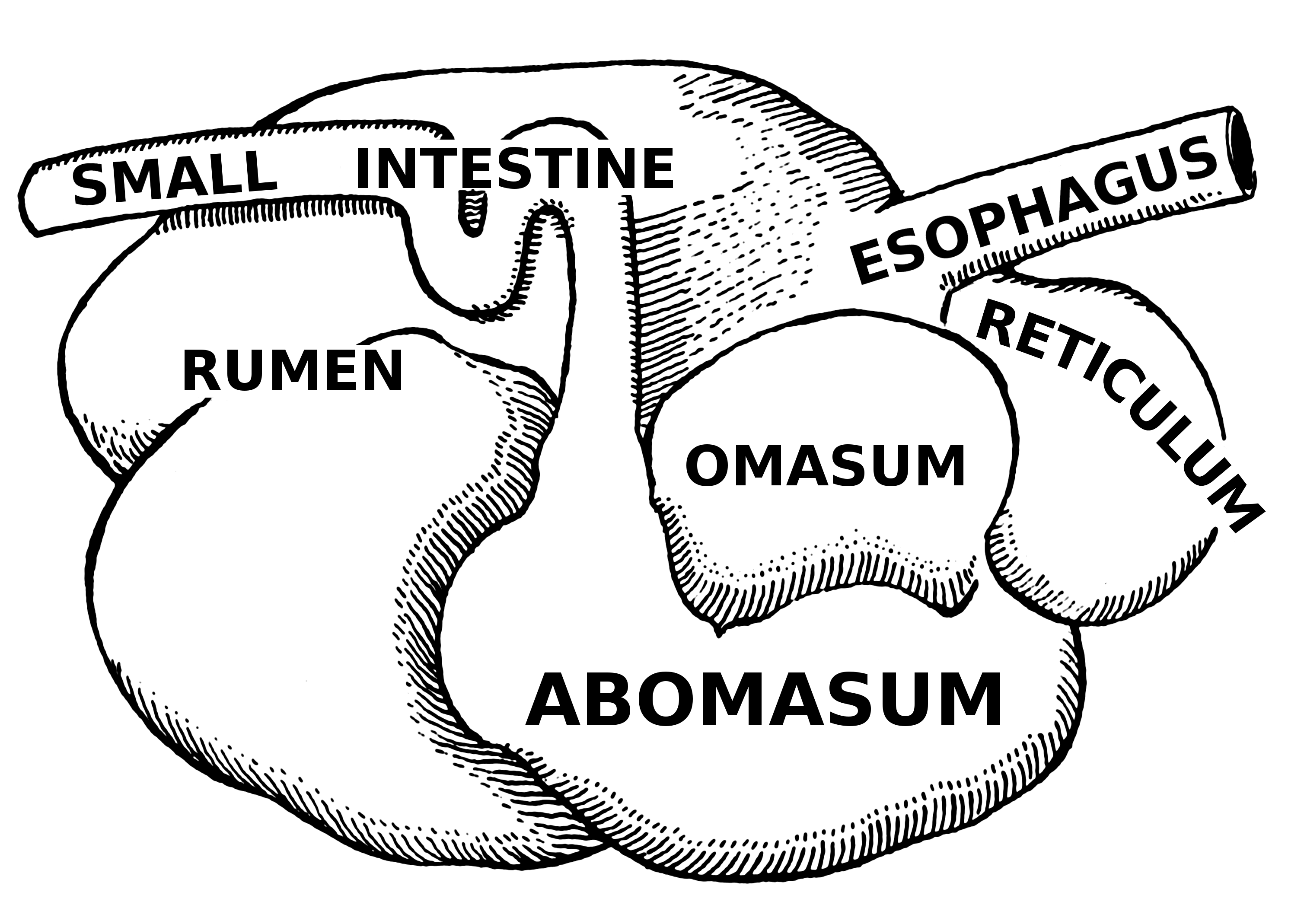
Ruminant stomach structure

The most abundant bacteria present in the rumen microbiome include Prevotella, Butyrivibrio, and Ruminococcus. This is due to ruminant organisms ingesting high-forage, commonly grass-based diets. Their typical high-forage diets cause this significant demand for cellulose digesting bacteria to be ever-present. Other bacteria, such as Lachnospira multiparus, Prevotella ruminicola, and Butyrivibrio fibrisolvens, play essential roles in the creation of volatile fatty acids (VFAs). Specific feeds can stimulate this extensive bacterial growth in the rumen and therefore aid in the production of these volatile fatty acids, which play a major role in rumen epithelium growth, capillary development, and papillae formation. Previous research identified the significant impact of volatile fatty acids on rumen development through the effects of the inter-ruminal insertion of acetate, propionate, and butyrate. The most visually notable and impactful of these volatile fatty acids was butyrate, which is synthesized naturally in ruminants through multiple anaerobic fermentation pathways of dietary substrates. Butyrate, mainly expressed in epithelial tissue lining, is involved in regulating a plethora of ruminant epithelial cell genes. Generally, butyrate regulates gene expression by acting on cell cycle control pathways. In the epithelial wall of the rumen, butyrate regulates epithelial cell gene expression to increase blood flow and papilla proliferation.

== Rumen microbiome genetics ==
Developing feeds to support the microbiome growth of both production and pet ruminant animals is vital; both for the overall health of the maturing animal and for reducing the costs associated with raising that animal. In the production animal realm, feeding can account for up to 75% of the overall cost associated with that animal, making it crucial to identify and satisfy the nutritional demands of the rumen. Sampling microbial DNA from rumen epithelial cells has led to the identification of microbial genes and functional pathways associated with animal growth factors. Microbial clusters in the rumen possess genes associated with many animal growth-related factors. Protein encoding genes that encode for bacterial cell functions, such as aguA, ptb, K01188, and murD, also are associated with the animal's average daily weight gain. Furthermore, vitamin B12 related genes, including cobD, tolC, and fliN, are also related to the daily feed intake of the animal.
