= Christian Georg Schmorl =

German pathologist

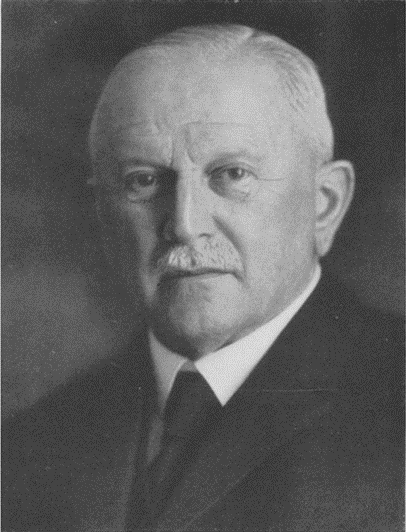
Christian Georg Schmorl

Christian Georg Schmorl (2 May 1861 – 14 August 1932) was a German pathologist who was a native of Mügeln in the Kingdom of Saxony.

He studied medicine at the University of Leipzig, where in 1892 he obtained his habilitation for forensic medicine. Up until 1894 he worked as an assistant under pathologist Felix Victor Birch-Hirschfeld at the university. For most of his career (1894–1931) he was associated with the city hospital in Dresden (Krankenhaus Dresden-Friedrichstadt).

Schmorl is remembered for his work in histology and his studies of the human skeleton. He created an histological stain especially designed to show the canaliculi and lamellae in sections of bone. He also described protrusions of the intervertebral disc into the vertebral body. These protrusions are now known as Schmorl's nodes. Shortly before his death, Schmorl published Die Gesunde und Kranke Wirbelsäule (The Healthy and Sick Spine). He died from sepsis caused by an infected finger, which he nicked in the process of dissecting a spine.

In 1904 Schmorl coined the term kernicterus to describe nuclear jaundice of the basal ganglia. This condition was earlier identified in 1875 by pathologist Johannes Orth.
