= Reticulorumen =

Chamber in ruminant animals' gastrointestinal tract

The reticulorumen (UK: /rəˈtɪkjʊləˌruːmən/; rə-TIK-yuu-lə-roo-mən) represents the first two chambers in the alimentary canal of ruminant animals. It is composed of the rumen and reticulum. The reticulum differs from the rumen with regard to the texture of its lining. The rumen wall is covered in small, finger-like projections called papillae, whereas the reticulum is lined with ridges that form a hexagonal honeycomb pattern. The ridges are approximately 0.1–0.2 mm wide and are raised 0.5 cm above the reticulum wall. The hexagons in the reticulum are approximately 2–5 cm wide in cattle. Despite the differences in the texture of the lining of the two parts of the reticulorumen, it represents one functional space.

Microbial fermentation degrades otherwise indigestible polymers in the reticulorumen to volatile fatty acids (VFAs), methane, and carbon dioxide. This fermentation is anaerobic, and allows the microbes in the reticulorumen to derive energy and amino nitrogen for growth and reproduction. Ruminants absorb the VFAs across the reticulorumen wall as an energy source, while the microbes eventually flow out of the rumen into the remainder of the alimentary canal, where their constituent proteins are eventually digested and absorbed. The reticulum, at approximately 5–20 litres, is considerably smaller in capacity than the rumen, which is approximately 100–200 litres in cattle. The oesophageal groove, which links the oesophagus and the omasum, is located in the reticulum.
