= David James Hamilton =

Scottish pathologist

David James Hamilton FRS FRSE FRCSE
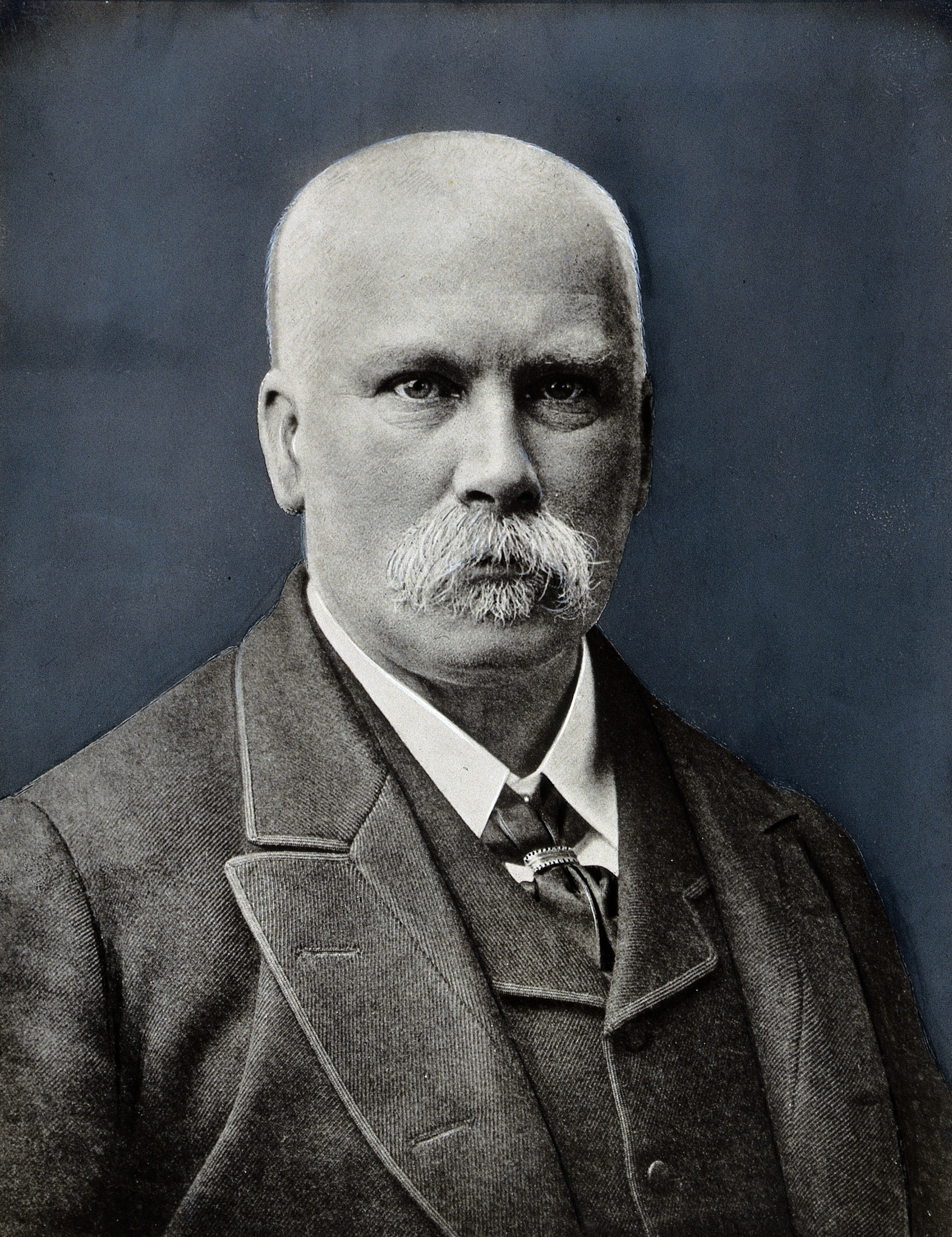
- Portrait (Wellcome Library)
- Born: 6 March 1849; Falkirk, Scotland
- Died: 19 February 1909 (aged 59); Aberdeen, Scotland
- Spouse: Elizabeth Griffith (m. 1880) Catherine Wilson (m. 1894; died 1908)
- Children: 3

David James Hamilton FRS FRSE FRCSE (6 March 1849 – 19 February 1909) was a Scottish pathologist known for his work on the diseases of sheep.

== Life ==
Born on 6 March 1849 in Falkirk, he was third child and second son of the nine children of George Hamilton, M.D., medical practitioner in the town, who wrote for Chambers's Encyclopædia, and his wife, Mary Wyse, daughter of a naval surgeon. A sister Mary married on 9 February 1891 becoming the second wife of Charles Saunders Dundas, 6th Viscount Melville.

At the age of 17 Hamilton became a medical student at Edinburgh, and was drawn to pathology by William Rutherford Sanders. After qualifying in 1870, he was house surgeon at the old Edinburgh Infirmary, resident medical officer at Chalmers Hospital, Edinburgh, and for two years at the Northern Hospital, Liverpool, where he wrote a prize essay on Diseases and injuries of the Spinal Cord. It enabled him to spend two years in working in pathology in Vienna, Munich, Strasbourg, and Paris.

In 1876, he returned as demonstrator of pathology to Edinburgh, and was also pathologist to the Edinburgh Royal Infirmary. During Professor Sanders's illness (1880-1) he delivered the lectures, but was passed over in the choice of his successor.

In 1882, when an extramural teacher in Edinburgh, Hamilton was appointed to the chair of pathology founded by William James Erasmus Wilson at Aberdeen. There he spent the rest of his career. He was the first to introduce the practical teaching of bacteriology into general class work. He initiated the bacteriological diagnosis of diphtheria and typhoid fever in the north of Scotland.

In 1881 Hamilton was elected a Fellow of the Royal Society of Edinburgh. His proposers were Sir William Turner, Alexander Crum Brown, Sir Robert Christison and Peter Guthrie Tait. In 1908 he was elected Fellow of the Royal Society of London. In 1907, the University of Edinburgh granted him an honorary doctorate (LLD).

He died on 19 February 1909 at home, 35 Queens Road in Aberdeen, and was buried in the city.

== Works ==
Hamilton investigated the diseases of sheep braxy and louping ill and was chairman of the departmental committee on this question appointed by the board of agriculture in 1901, which presented its report in 1906. He confirmed the description of the braxy microbe given in 1888 by Ivar Nielsen and discovered the bacillus of louping ill. He wrote widely on all branches of pathology, especially on the nervous system, tuberculosis, and other diseases of the lungs, and on the healing of wounds. His textbook on pathology (2 vols. 1889–94) was recognised as a standard work.

== Family ==
Hamilton married:

1. in 1880, Elizabeth, daughter of Thomas Griffith, by whom he had two sons and one daughter;
2. in 1894, Catherine, daughter of John Wilson of South Bankaskine, Falkirk; she died without issue in June 1908.

== Notes ==
Attribution

This article incorporates text from a publication now in the public domain: Lee, Sidney, ed. (1912). "Hamilton, David James". Dictionary of National Biography (2nd supplement). Vol. 2. London: Smith, Elder & Co.
