= Schmorl's nodes =

- Other names: Intraosseous disk herniation, Schmorl's nodules
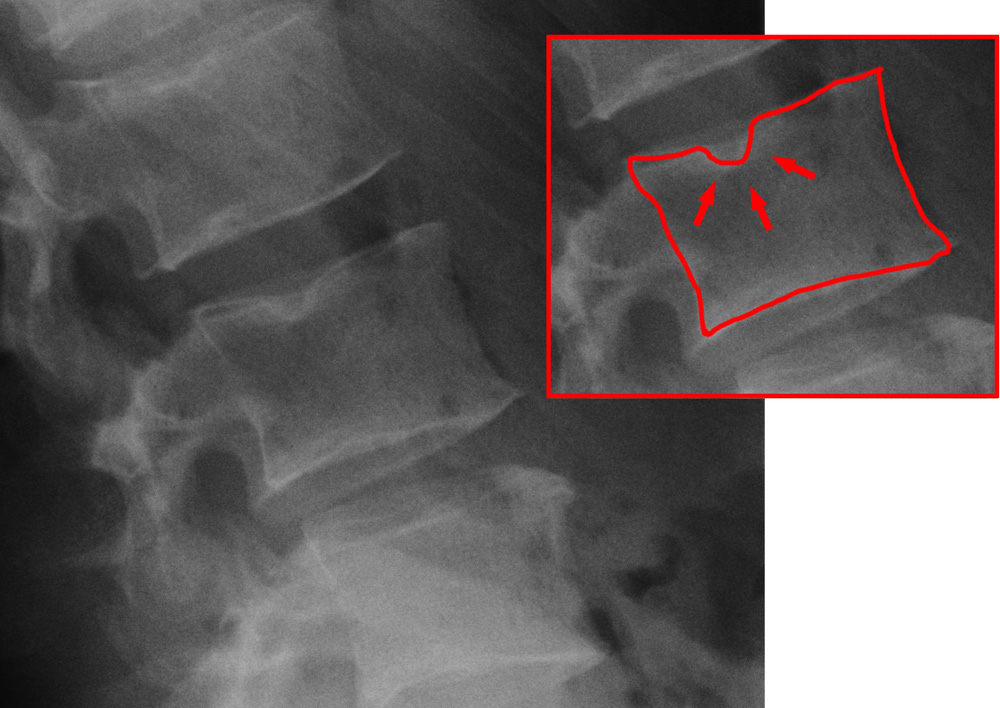
- X-ray image of Schmorl's nodes in the lumbar spine
- Specialty: Rheumatology

Schmorl's nodes are protrusions of the nucleus pulposus of the intervertebral disc through the vertebral body endplate and into the adjacent vertebra.

== Signs and symptoms ==
These are protrusions of disc material into the surface of the vertebral body, which may contact the marrow of the vertebra and lead to inflammation. The protrusions are also associated with necrosis of the vertebral bone and the question of whether these protrusions and inflammation cause the necrosis, or whether the cartilage migrates into areas that have become necrotic due to other conditions, is under investigation.

They may or may not be symptomatic, and their link to back pain is controversial. Williams and colleagues note that this relationship may be due to lumbar disc disease, as the two commonly occur simultaneously.

== Causes ==
Schmorl's nodes are fairly common, especially with minor degeneration of the aging spine, but they are also seen in younger spines. Schmorl's nodes often cause no symptoms, but may simply reflect that "wear and tear" of the spine has occurred over time; they may also reflect that bone strength was at one time somewhat compromised, perhaps due to a vitamin D deficiency although this has yet to be confirmed with studies, or if heavy lifting is done at a young age before the vertebral bodies are completely ossified such as in young farm workers. There is also a strong heritability of Schmorl's Nodes (>70%). While often non-complicating, Schmorl's nodes also tend to occur more often in cases of spinal deformity, specifically Scheuermann's disease. These defects are caused when the vertebra loses its normal function and is not moving/hypomobile/subluxated. During this time the forces normally distributed by the nucleus pulposus (the incompressible gelatinous center of the intervertebral disc) are concentrated in a certain area causing endplates to deform in a concave manner.

== Diagnosis ==
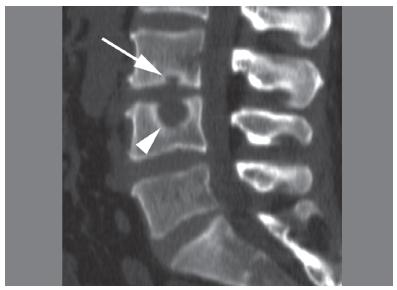
CT scan in the sagittal plane of two Schmorl's nodes. The small Schmorl's node at the inferior endplate of the L3 vertebral body (arrow) has typical features, being broad-based at the endplate, with well-defined contours and thin marginal sclerosis. A large and less typical Schmorl's node (arrowhead) is observed at the superior endplate of L4.

Schmorl's nodes can be detected with X-rays, although they can be imaged better by CT or MRI. They are considered to be vertical disc herniations through the cartilaginous vertebral body endplates. Schmorl's nodes can sometimes be seen radiographically, however they are more often seen on MRI, even when not visible on plain X-rays. They may or may not be symptomatic, and their etiological significance for back pain is controversial. In a study in Spine by Hamanishi, et al., Schmorl's nodes were observed on MRI in 19% of 400 patients with back pain, and in only 9% of an asymptomatic control group. The authors concluded that Schmorl's nodes are areas of "vertical disc herniation" through areas of weakness in the endplate.

== Management ==
Painful Schmorl's node can be diagnosed by discography, which demonstrates an intravertebral disc herniation with concomitant back pain. Surgical treatment should be considered in a patient with persistent disabling back pain. When surgical treatment is indicated, eradication of the intervertebral disc including Schmorl's node and segmental fusion are preferable.

== Eponym ==
Schmorl's nodes are named after German pathologist Christian Georg Schmorl (1861–1932).
