= Omasitis =

Omasitis is an inflammation of the omasum, the third compartment of the stomach in ruminants. It usually accompanies rumenitis, and is often caused by infection with Fusobacterium necrophorum.
