= Abomasitis =

Disease of ruminants

Abomasitis (abomasal bloat) is a relatively rare ruminant disease characterized by inflammation of abomasum usually caused by larval development in young calves, lambs, and goat kids. It occurs with gastroenteritis, but can also be a side effect of other diseases. However, it is rarely diagnosed as a separate condition.

== Signs and symptoms ==
A characteristic sign is the swollen abomasum wall, which can also be necrotic and hemorrhagic. Edema in the mucosa may also occur.

Symptoms include anorexia, the bloat of the abdomen, colic and diarrhea. The animals can seem passive and weak. Another sign can be that the affected animal separates itself from the herd. Without treatment, the animal can die in a very short amount of time.

== Cause ==
Abomasitis can be caused by several factors:

- Bacterial infections (e.g. Clostridium septicum, C. perfringens (type A), C. sordellii, and Sarcina spp.)
- Viruses like Rinderpest morbillivirus or Pestivirus can also cause an inflammation of the mucosa, as well as some metabolic diseases (e.g. rumen acidosis).
- An unsuitable diet, such as excessive feeding or feeding lush forages.
- Stress.
- Foreign body in the abomasum.

== Diagnosis ==
There are no diagnostic methods to identify abomasitis in living animals. A post-mortem necropsy of the intestines is needed.

== Treatment ==
Treatment should start immediately via oral and intravenous medication. The diet should be reduced.

The animal should also be treated with antibiotics to prevent intestinal bacteria spreading to other organs. Colloids can also help in severe cases. In cases when an animal has a lot of fluid in the abomasum, a gastric-rumen tube should be used to help extract the extra fluid. A special abomasum puncture can help if the abdomen is swollen with gas or air. This technique has only been tested in lambs, not in calves. In the early stages of the disease, rolling the calf over and puncturing the abomasum can help the calf recover. If the animal does not respond to the treatments, a surgery should be performed to remove damaged tissue and excess fluid from the abomasum.

== Fatality rate ==
The exact fatality rate is uncertain. However, it is assumed to be very high due to the inherently late diagnosis of the disease.

== Prevention ==
There are no reliable prevention methods. However, it is recommended to disinfect all the equipment the calves are regularly in contact with to prevent the spreading of bacteria. Furthermore, it is recommended to improve the feeding situation, like switching from bucket to bottle-feeding, or to make sure that the feeding milk is at body temperature. In some cases, a regular immunization of exposed animals can prevent abomasitis.
