= Johannes Orth =

German pathologist

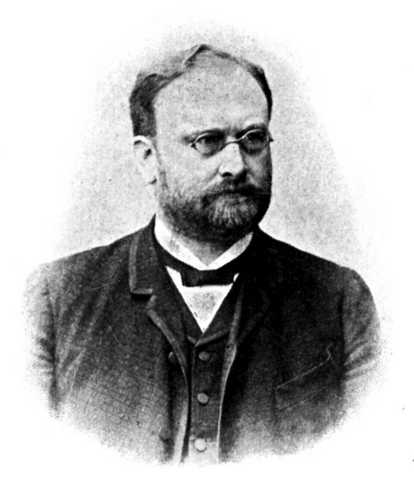
Johannes Orth (1847–1923)

Johannes Orth (14 January 1847 – 13 January 1923 in Berlin) was a German pathologist born in Wallmerod.

He studied medicine at the universities of Heidelberg, Würzburg and Bonn, receiving his habilitation in 1872 while an assistant to Eduard von Rindfleisch at Bonn. Afterwards, he served as an assistant under Rudolf Virchow (1821–1902) in Berlin. In 1878 he became a professor at the University of Göttingen, and in 1902, following the death of Virchow, he returned to Berlin as director of the clinic of pathology.

Orth specialized in the pathological study of infectious diseases, particularly tuberculosis and endocarditis.

In 1875, he documented an account involving an autopsy of a jaundiced infant with intense yellow staining of the basal ganglia, hippocampus, the third ventricle, as well as parts of the cerebellum. However, it wouldn't be until the early 20th century that this condition would be further comprehended. In 1903, pathologist Christian Georg Schmorl (1861–1932) presented the results of 120 autopsies of jaundiced infants, with six of the cases having the staining phenomena described by Orth. Schmorl coined the term "kernicterus" (jaundice of the basal ganglia) for the yellow staining phenomenon.

== Selected writings ==
- Ueber das Vorkommen von bilirubinkrystallen bei neugeborenen kindern; in Virchow's Archiv Pathol. Anat. 63:447–462. (1875).
- Compendium der pathologisch-anatomischen Diagnostik (1894) - Compendium of pathologic-anatomical diagnostics.
- Cursus der normalen Histologie - Cursus of normal histology.
- Lehrbuch der speciellen pathologischen Anatomie - Textbook of special pathological anatomy.
