= Lampredotto =

Florentine dish made of cattle stomachs

Ingredients and sandwich

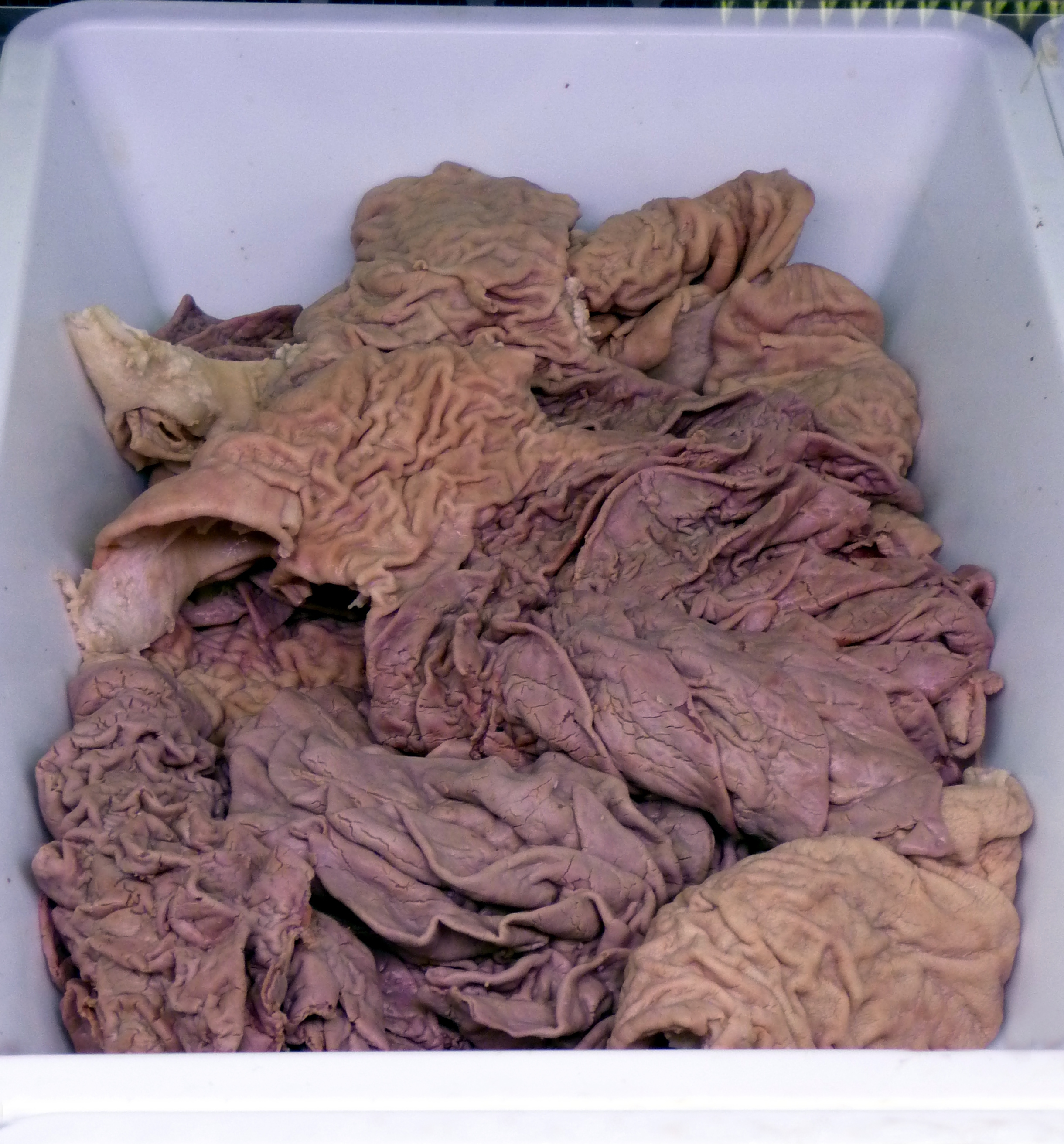
Lampredotto, cooked abomasum

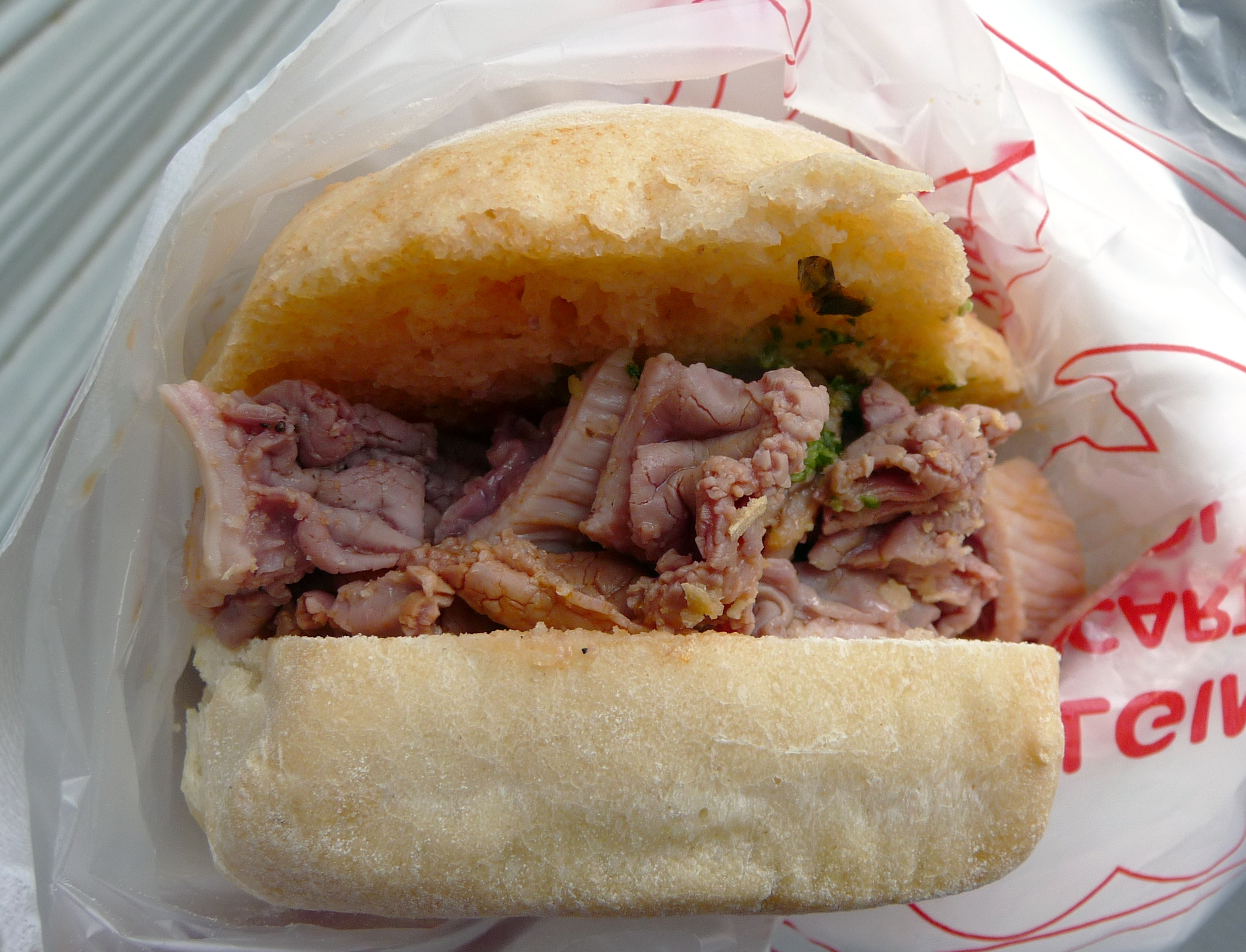
Lampredotto sandwich in 2009

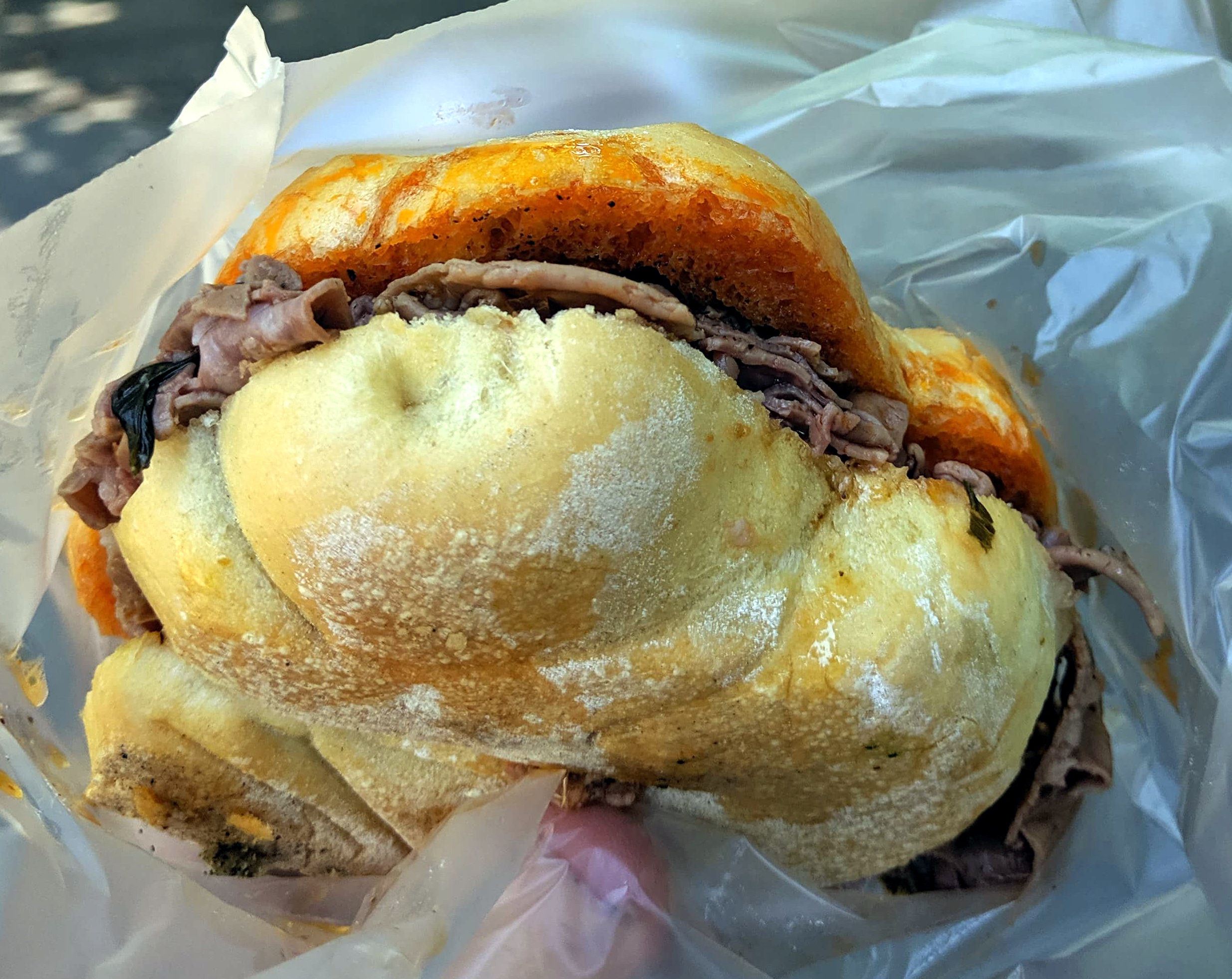
Lampredotto sandwich in 2019

Lampredotto (Italian: [lampreˈdɔtto]) is a typical Florentine dish, made from the fourth and final stomach of cattle, the abomasum.

Lampredotto is derived from the Italian word for lamprey eels, lampreda, as the tripe resembles a lamprey in shape and color.

A sandwich with lampredotto—panino co i' lampredotto—has been described as a "classic Florentine" sandwich and is a traditional regional street food in Florence. Lampredotto is typically slow-cooked in a vegetable broth, seasoned with herbs, chopped, and served in a bread roll. It is often topped with a spicy sauce or a green sauce (salsa verde).

The Daily Meal has called lampredotto "a tripe-lover's dream".

== See also ==
Media related to Lampredotto at Wikimedia Commons
