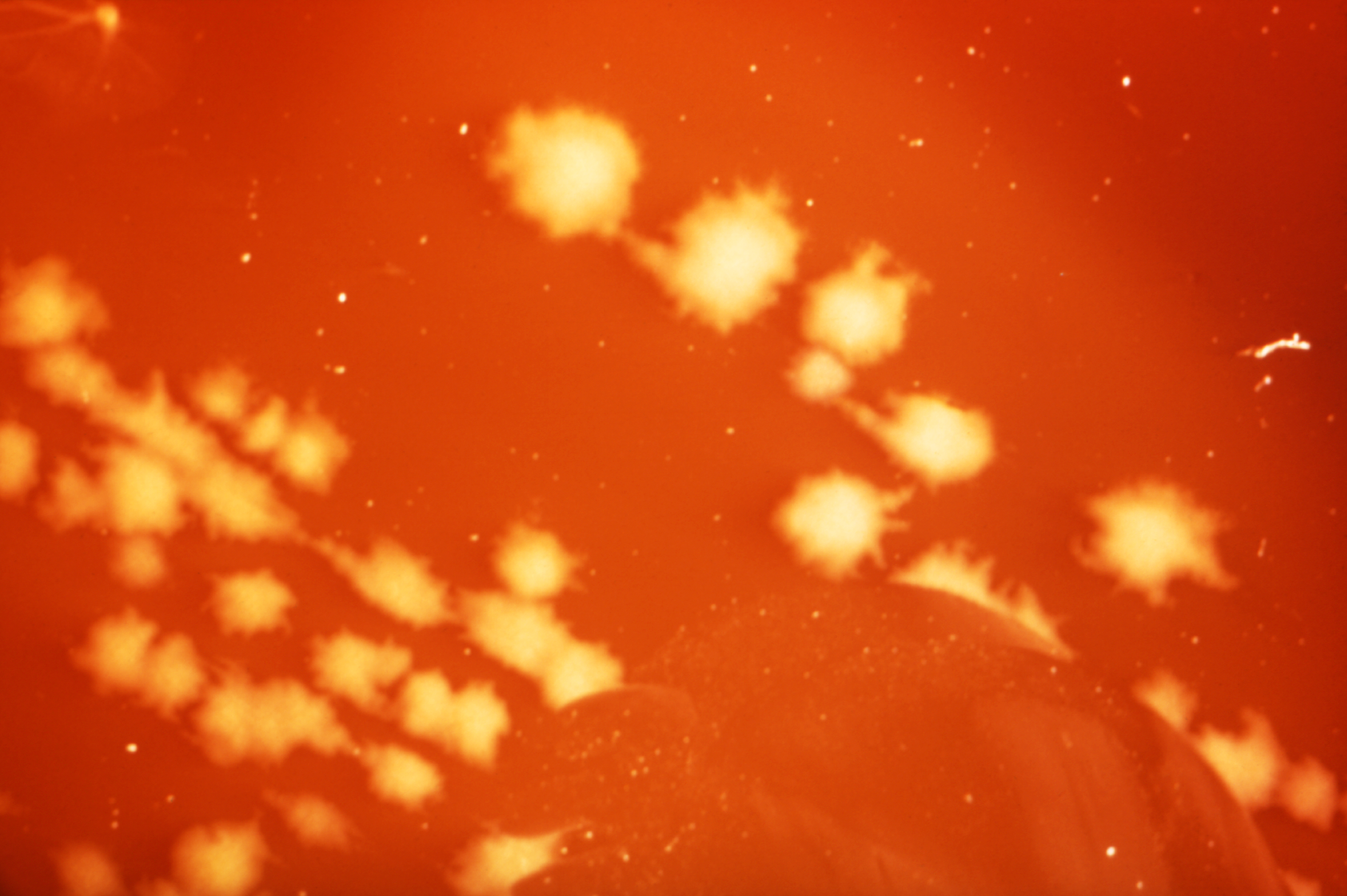

Scientific classification
- Domain: Bacteria
- Kingdom: Bacillati
- Phylum: Bacillota
- Class: Clostridia
- Order: Eubacteriales
- Family: Clostridiaceae
- Genus: Clostridium
- Species: C. septicum

Binomial name
- Clostridium septicum (Macé 1889) Ford 1927

= Clostridium septicum =

Species of bacterium

Clostridium septicum is a Gram positive, spore forming, obligate anaerobic bacterium.

Clostridium septicum can cause gas gangrene, but unlike other Clostridium species like Clostridium perfringens, no trauma is necessary at the site of the infection. It is thought that the infection is established by hematogenous spread from the gastrointestinal tract. Gas gangrene caused by Clostridium septicum is associated with colorectal cancer and other defects of the bowel.

Clostridium septicum causes myonecrosis through the release of exotoxins such as the alpha toxin, lethal toxin, and hemolytic toxin

== General and morphological information ==
Clostridium septicum is a large, Gram-positive, rod-shaped bacterium that is a member of the normal gut flora in humans as well as other animals. C. septicum are spore formers, with a terminal spore that gives them their drumstick-like shape. They are also motile bacteria, using peritrichous flagellae to navigate from one environment to the next. C. septicum are fermentative anaerobes and therefore can live off of a variety of substrates like sugars, amino acids and other organic compounds, generating molecular hydrogen gas and carbon dioxide as byproducts of cellular respiration.

Clostridium septicum can cause infection quickly if the gut tissue becomes necrotic or inflamed. C. septicum produces four toxins; alpha, beta, gamma and delta, with alpha toxin being necrotic and lethal. Their anaerobic nature creates susceptibility in areas of decreased blood flow. Although rare, C. septicum infections are often found in individuals with a recent history of trauma, surgery, peripheral vascular disease, diabetes, colon cancer, skin infections or burns and septic abortions.

== Ecology and habitat ==
Clostridium septicum is a resident bacterium of the human microflora, however it can be found in almost any anoxic habitat in which exists organic compounds. Under unfavorable conditions, C. septicum forms endospores allowing it to survive under harsh conditions such as extreme temperature, dry land, and nutrient-deficient habitats.

== Pathogenesis ==
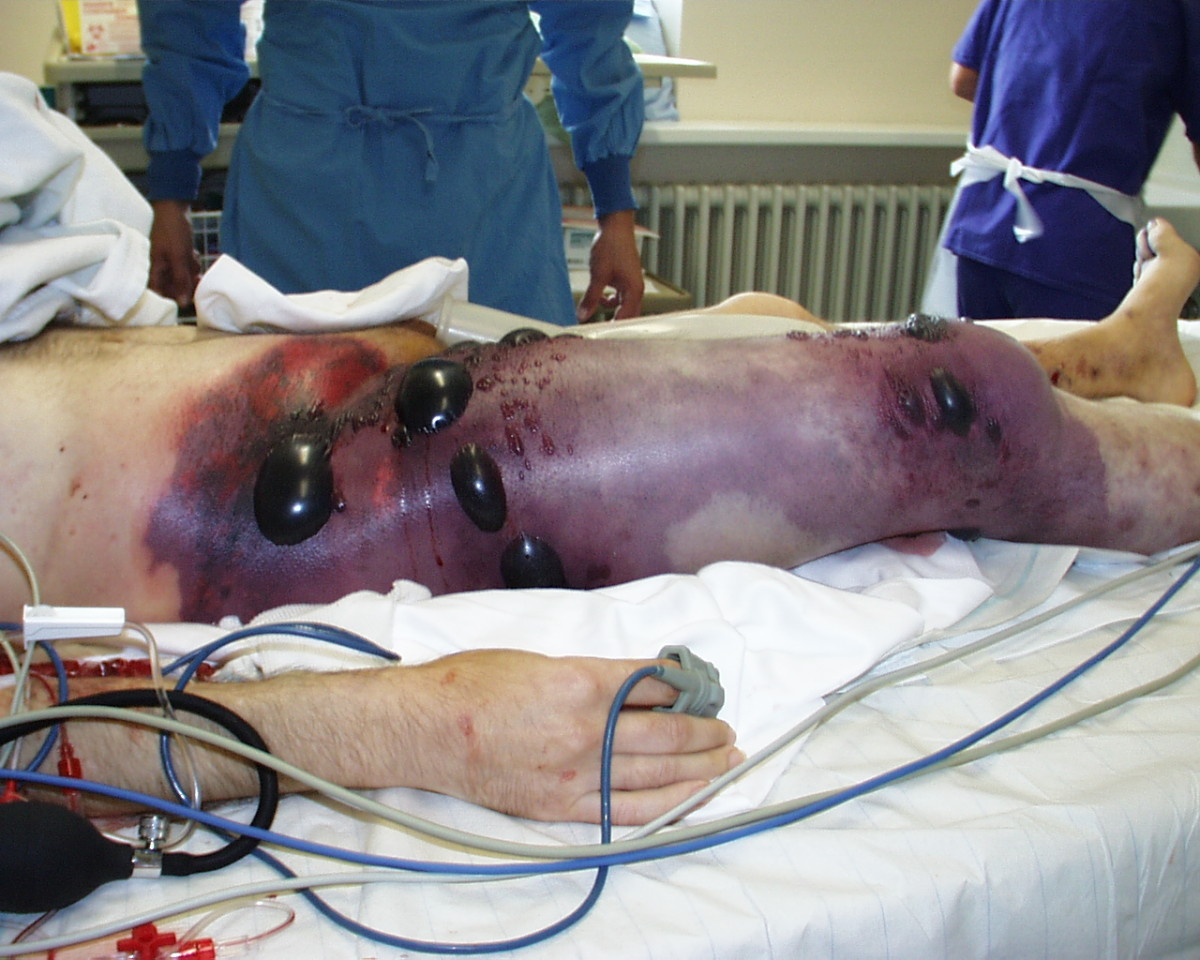
Patient with right leg gas gangrene. The right leg is edematous and discolored with fluid-filled bullae.

As of 2006, between 1000 and 3000 cases of clostridial myonecrosis were reported in the United States each year, typically accompanied by another pre-existing medical condition. C. septicum is one of several bacteria responsible for myonecrosis, otherwise known as gas gangrene. Infection by C. septicum was once thought to be extremely rare, however anaerobic laboratory techniques allowed for the discovery of the true potential of this infectious microbe. Infections are typically seen in settings of immunodeficiency, trauma, surgery, malignancy, skin infections/burns, and septic abortions. Sites prone to infection are those with poor vascular supply, although because of pH, electrolyte and osmotic differences, the colon may promote the growth of C. septicum better than most other anatomical regions. One of the more aggressive progenitors of gas gangrene, C. septicum infection progresses very rapidly, with a mortality rate of approximately 79% in adults, typically occurring within 48 hours of infection. The greatest survival rates are typically seen in patients without pre-existing medical conditions, and with infection localized to the extremities. Gas gangrene proceeds via disruption of blood flow to the infected site, resulting in diminished levels of oxygen and nutrients ultimately causing premature cell death and tissue necrosis. Four toxins have been isolated from C. septicum: the lethal alpha toxin, DNase beta-toxin, hyaluronidase gamma toxin, and the thiol-activated (or septicolysin) delta toxin. Alpha toxin causes intravascular hemolysis and tissue necrosis and is well known as the main virulent factor in C. septicum. Symptoms of infection include pain, described as a heaviness or pressure that is disproportionate to physical findings, tachycardia, and hypotension. Tissue necrosis then causes edema and ischemia resulting in metabolic acidosis, fever, and kidney failure. The carbon dioxide and hydrogen produced during cellular respiration move through tissue planes, causing their separation, producing features characteristic of palpable emphysema. This also results in a magenta-bronze skin discoloration and bulla filled with a foul-smelling serosanguinous fluid.

=== Association with malignancy ===
Clostridium septicum derived gas gangrene has shown strong correlations with increased levels of malignancy. Generally, patients with C. septicum infections present colonic carcinoma or a tumor that has metastasized to the colon. One particular study by Alpern and Dowell noted 85% comorbidity with malignancy, while another study by Koransky et al. noted 71% comorbidity. This relationship suggests the opportunistic nature of this pathogen raising the possibility that immunosuppression plays a key role in the ability of C. septicum to cause infection. It seems likely that either the treatment or the malignancy itself impairs the immune function of the gastrointestinal mucosa allowing C. septicum to gain access to the circulatory system.

== Alpha toxin ==
The alpha toxin produced by C. septicum is the underlying cause of gas gangrene, otherwise known as myonecrosis; a disease characterized by extensive tissue destruction, edema, thrombosis, and fluid-filled bullae. Alpha toxin is a pore-forming toxin exotoxin that is secreted as a protoxin that requires proteolytic cleavage of a 5kDa peptide from its carboxy-terminal in order to become active. Cleavage is typically initiated by the cell surface protease furin. Once activated, the toxin can oligomerize and form ion-permeable pores through the cell membrane. Pores formed by alpha toxin are approximately 1.5 nm in diameter, allowing the release of potassium ions from erythrocytes, thus disrupting the ionic equilibrium within the cell. Alpha toxin binds GPI-anchored cell surface receptors including the human folate receptor (hFR) as well as the neuronal molecules contactin and Thy-1 (CD90). Alpha toxin can activate the immune sensor NLRP3 in mammalian cells, causing the cells to die and release inflammatory molecules.

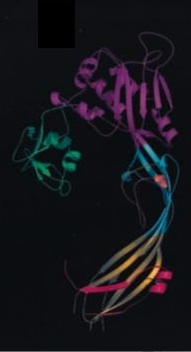
Solved crystal structure of aerolysin. Green=D1, Purple=D2, Cyan=D3, Yellow=D4, Orange=TMD, and Red=Propeptide

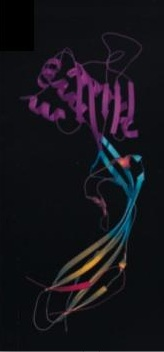
Proposed crystal structure of Alpha-toxin based on the structure of aerolysin. Purple=D1, Cyan=D2, Yellow=D3, Orange=TMD, Red=Propeptide

=== Alpha-toxin and aerolysin ===
Quite surprisingly, the alpha toxin of C. septicum is not related to the alpha toxin of C. perfringens (another bacterium implicated in the pathogenesis of gas gangrene). C. septicum alpha toxin does, however, exhibit similarities to aerolysin, another beta-pore forming toxin. Alpha toxin and aerolysin share approximately 72% sequence similarity and have numerous functional similarities as well. Both proteins require cleavage by furin, or a furin-like protease, and then oligomerize to form transmembrane pores. Similarities between the two toxins have also been discovered through analysis of the crystal structure of aerolysin. Aerolysin is a bilobar protein consisting of four domains (D1-D4). The smallest lobe of aerolysin is missing in the alpha toxin of C. septicum, implying that the alpha toxin is monolobar with three domains, similar to domains D2-D4 in aerolysin. Further research has led to the conclusions that the D1 domain is involved in receptor-binding and the D3 domain functions to prevent premature oligomerization of alpha toxin.

== Diagnosis and treatment ==
If left untreated, the mortality rate for C. septicum infection nears 100%. A study by Cline and Turnbull offers that diagnosis be based on findings of pain disproportionate to clinical findings or injury, marked tachycardia, discolored or edematous skin, and a Gram-stain of bullous drainage showing Gram-positive bacilli without spores and few leukocytes. Physical manifestations of infection include pain caused by infiltration of the infected muscle with edema and gas, tachycardia, muscle and skin discoloration, and the presence of a brown, watery discharge with a foul smell within the wounds.

Treatment for C. septicum infection includes antibiotic administration, surgical intervention, and hyperbaric oxygen therapy (HBOT). For antibiotic selection, usual anaerobic coverage can include penicillin, metronidazole or clindamycin. There are no CLSI standards for susceptibility testing so antibiotic selection is often made based on local patterns of resistance. In a Canadian survey from 2000 to 2006, 19 isolates were tested and 9 (47%) were resistant to clindamycin and 1 (5%) was resistant to both metronidazole and clindamycin. None had reduced susceptibility to penicillin. The Infectious Diseases Society of America (IDSA) recommends that for gas gangrene where clostridium has been identified as the cause that both penicillin and clindamycin be used. Often in severe cases amputation becomes the only viable option remaining to clear the infection.

== Other animals ==
In sheep, C. septicum causes a disease known as braxy; affected animals are generally found dead.

== See also ==
- Gas gangrene
- Pore-forming toxin
