= Fibrolytic bacterium =

Fibrolytic bacteria constitute a group of microorganisms that are able to process complex plant polysaccharides thanks to their capacity to synthesize cellulolytic and hemicellulolytic enzymes. Polysaccharides are present in plant cellular cell walls in a compact fiber form where they are mainly composed of cellulose and hemicellulose.

Fibrolytic enzymes, which are classified as cellulases, can hydrolyze the β (1 ->4) bonds in plant polysaccharides. Cellulase and hemicellulase (also known as xylanase) are the two main representatives of these enzymes.

== Biological characteristics ==
Fibrolytic bacteria use glycolysis and the pentose phosphate pathway as the main metabolic routes to catabolize carbohydrates in order to obtain energy and carbon backbones. They use ammonia as the major and practically exclusive source of nitrogen, and they require several B-vitamins for their development. They often depend on other microorganisms to obtain some of their nutrients. Although their growth rate is considered slow, it can be enhanced in the presence of considerable amounts of short-chain fatty acids (isobutyric and isovaleric). These compounds are normally generated as a product of the amino acid fermentative activity of other microorganisms. Because of their habitat conditions, most fibrolytic bacteria are anaerobic.

== Cellulolytic communities ==
Most fibrolytic bacteria are classified as Bacteroidota or Bacillota and include several bacterial species with diverse morphological and physiological characteristics.

KNOWN FIBROLYTIC BACTERIA (CELLULYTIC AND HEMICELLULYTIC)
GRAM-	GRAM+
Bacteroides ruminicola	Butyrivibrio fibrisolvens
Bacteroides succinogenes	Eubacterium cellulosolvens
Fibrobacter succinogenes	Eubacterium ruminantiu
Prevotella ruminicola	Ruminococcus albus
	Ruminococcus sp.
	Ruminococcus flavefaciens

They are normally commensal species which have a symbiotic relationship with different insect and mammal species, constituting one of the main components of their gastrointestinal flora. In fact, in herbivores each milliliter of ruminal content can reach about 50 million of bacteria of a great variety of genera and species. .

Given the importance of industrial processing of plant fibers in different fields, the genomic analysis of fibrolytic communities in the gastrointestinal tract of different animals, may provide new biotechnological tools for the transformation of complex polysaccharides (including lignocellulytic biomass) .

== Applications ==
So far, most applications are performed using enzymatic aqueous solutions containing one or more types of cellulases. Enzyme production for industrial use has its origins at the end of the nineteenth century in Denmark and Japan. An enzyme is a cellular product which can be obtained from animal and vegetable tissues, or through the biological activity of selected microorganisms. Enzymes are then used in different industrial processes. In order to produce enzymatic solutions for industrial applications, it is first necessary to obtain them in huge amounts and then, purify them to a certain extent; this makes the production process long and expensive. One possible alternative would be working with microbial communities, which makes the process shorter, and cheaper. However, process control is much more difficult when working with bacterial communities than when applying enzymatic solutions.

== General applications ==
In the early 1980s, enzymes produced by fibrolytic bacteria were incorporated in cattle food. This allowed them to obtain more energy from the forage which they fed on, thanks to the partial digestion of lignocellulosic material. They have been gaining importance in the food processing industry, in the filtration of fruit and vegetables juices, in edible oil extraction, in baking, etc. Furthermore, the use of these kinds of enzymes was progressively extended to the textile and laundry industry, where they are used to fade the intense blue of fabrics and to provide them a more faded appearance. In the chemical industry, these enzymes have allowed the development of new detergents and washing-up liquids; in the paper industry they play a very important role in bleaching processes, minimizing toxicity and being more economic; and in biotechnological research, the use of the cellulose binding domains from fibrolytic enzymes has allowed the purification of recombinant proteins.

== Energy applications ==
Fibrolytic bacteria are expected to play an important role in renewable energy production through biomass degradation. One of the main objectives of biotechnology is biofuel production with the aim to reduce CO_{2} emissions, because biofuels obtained from plant material does not contribute a net atmospheric input of CO_{2}. The gas emitted during the combustion of biofuels of cellulolytic origin will be reabsorbed in vegetable growth and this is why it does not have an environmental impact so negative.

== Discovery of fibrolytic genes and fibrolytic bacteria ==
Probably, the best studied fibrolytic community is the one in the rumen of ruminants. However, there are other organisms that are able to degrade vegetable fibres, from insects to mollusks, all of them can do it thanks to the activity of different microbial symbionts. In order to improve the industrial transformation processes of vegetable fibres and related applications it is necessary to discover new and efficient enzymes and specialized bacterial communities. Next we describe the main steps in the discovery of genes and genomes from fibrolytic bacteria . The first step that can be followed to obtain fibrolytic bacteria from gastrointestinal cavities in ruminants is the culture of the target communities inside the rumen of a cow by introducing a nylon bag containing a forage with a high cellulose content (for example, Panicum virgatum).

An orifice is surgically done to the spine making rumen available from the outside through a tampon which avoids the closing of the fistula. The nylon bag is incubated in the rumen 72 hours. After incubation it is important to separate the microorganisms adhered to the vegetable fibres from the ones that are in suspension in the ruminal fluid.

== Analysis of microbial community specificity ==
To analyze the specificity of the community on the sample, one can compare the diversity of sequences of small subunit ribosomal RNA of the sample with a sample of reference. After extraction and purification of the DNA of the sample, the PCR emulsion technique is used to amplify the genes of the small ribosomal subunit. Then each amplicon is sequenced with the pyrosequencing technique. Once we have the sequences they have to be compared and grouped according to the degree of similarity, to define OTUS (Operational Taxonomic Units)-which are groups of sequences that belong to organisms phylogenetically close. Comparing OTUS of the two samples the differences of both microbial communities could be assessed.

== Metagenomic sequencing ==
In order to obtain the sequences of lignocelulitic genes an accurate metagenomic analysis is done. Sequencing and assembly of the whole DNA of the sample gives the metagenome of the sample.

== Identification of carbohydrate active genes ==
The identification of genes that encode for proteins which have fibrolytic activity is done in two steps. First, a bioinformatic analysis is performed. The sequences obtained in the metagenomic analysis are compared with the gene sequences of known fibrolytic proteins (for example the sequences that are on the data base Carbohidrate Active Enzymes (CAZy)). In this first step the number of candidate genes is reduced considerably and these are the ones that are used on the following step. In the second step, a library for protein expression is built. Expression vectors are introduced in E.coli and after the growth of these bacteria the supernatant is tested for biochemical activity on different substrates.

== Identification of fibrolytic microorganisms ==
To identify to which microorganisms belong the enzymes which have been identified, and check if metagenome assembly was right, a separation of different species of bacteria from the sample can be done by flow cytometry. The use of specific antibodies labelled with fluorochromes makes possible to separate the different cell types of the sample which belong to different phylogenetic groups. This technique is called Fluorescence Activated Cell Sorting (FACS). Once the different species of bacteria are separated, their genomes are sequenced and the validation of the metagenomic analysis can be done.
