= Felix Victor Birch-Hirschfeld =

German pathologist

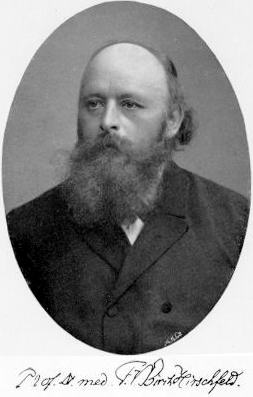

Felix Victor Birch-Hirschfeld (2 May 1842 – 19 November 1899) was a German pathologist who was a native of Kluvensieck bei Rendsburg.

== Biography ==
In 1867 he received his medical doctorate from the University of Leipzig, where he studied under Carl Reinhold August Wunderlich (1815–1877) and Ernst Leberecht Wagner (1828–1888). In 1870 he became a prosector at the city hospital in Dresden, and in 1885 returned to Leipzig, where he succeeded Julius Cohnheim (1839–1884) as chair of pathological anatomy. One of his better known assistants was pathologist Christian Georg Schmorl (1861–1932).

Birch-Hirschfeld made important contributions in several facets of pathological medicine. He is known for his work in the field of bacteriology, with tuberculosis being the primary focus in regards to infectious diseases. In 1898 he described the unitary nature of nephroblastoma.

== Associated eponym ==
- "Birch-Hirschfeld stain": A stain that was formerly used for demonstrating amyloid, and consisted of a mixture of Bismarck brown and crystal violet.

== Selected writings ==
- Lehrbuch der Pathologischen Anatomie, (Textbook of pathological anatomy) Leipsig, 1877
- Die Entstehung der Gelbsucht neugeborener Kinder, (The emergence of jaundice in newborn children); Virchow's Archiv für pathologische Anatomie und Physiologie und für klinische Medicin, Berlin, LXXXVII.
- The Skrophulose, In: Hugo Wilhelm von Ziemssen's "Handbuch der speciellen Pathologie und Therapie". Volume XIII; second edition
- Grundriss der Allgemeinen Pathologie, (Outline of general pathology) Leipzig, 1892
- Über die Krankheiten der Leber und Milz, (On diseases of the liver and spleen). In: Carl Jakob Adolf Christian Gerhardt's "Handbuch der Kinderkrankheiten". Volume IV, Tübingen, H. Laupp, (1877–1893).

== See also ==
- Pathology
- List of pathologists
