= Abomasum =

Fourth and final stomach compartment in ruminants

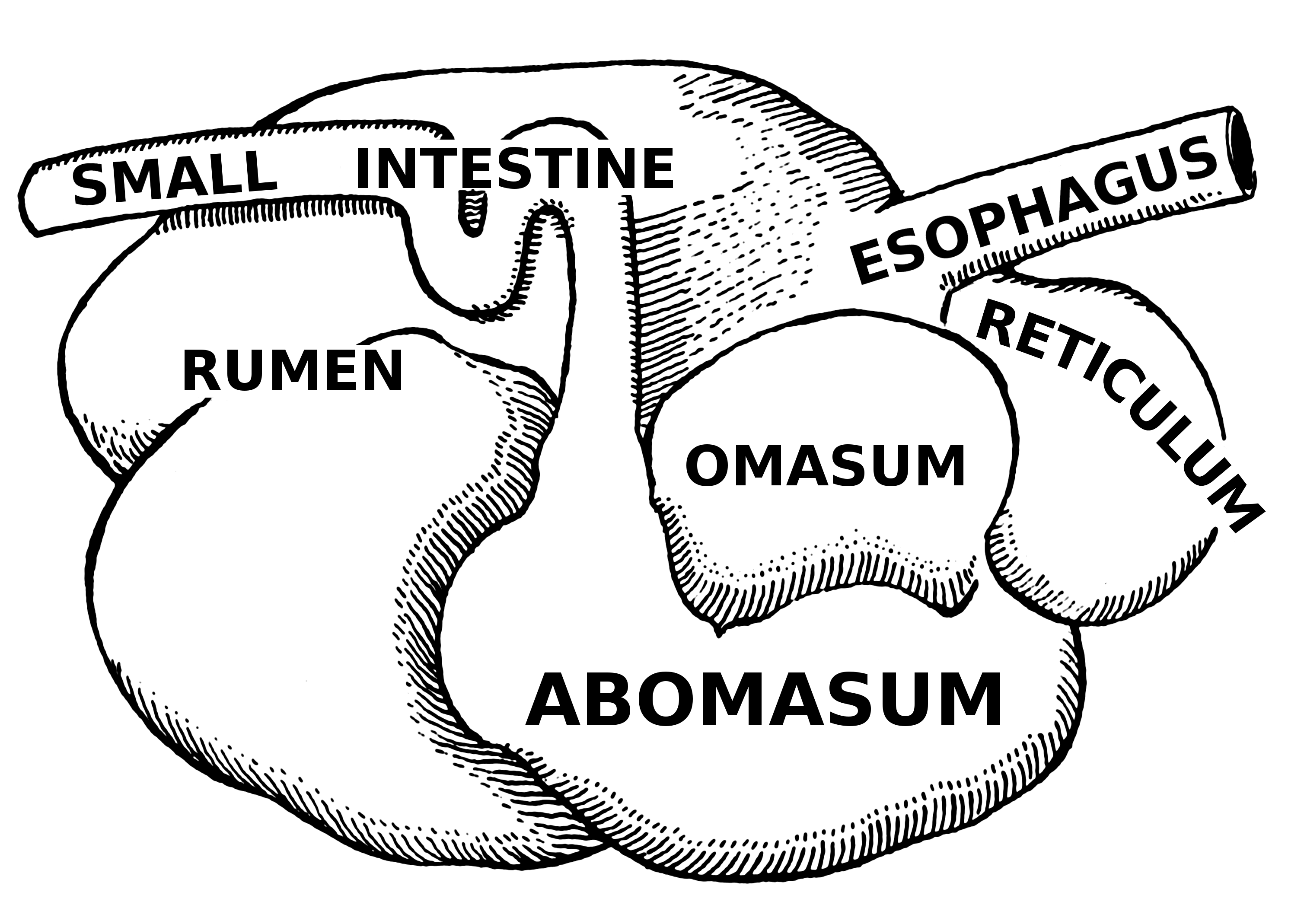
The ruminant digestive system

The abomasum, also known as the maw, rennet-bag, or reed tripe, is the fourth and final stomach compartment in ruminants. It secretes rennet, which is used in cheese creation.

The word abomasum (ab- "away from" + omasum "intestine of an ox") is from Neo-Latin and it was first used in English in 1706. It is possibly from the Gaulish language.

== Function ==
The abomasum's normal anatomical location is along the ventral midline. It is a secretory stomach similar in anatomy and function to the monogastric stomach. It serves primarily in the acid hydrolysis of microbial and dietary protein, preparing these protein sources for further digestion and absorption in the small intestine. The abomasum is lined with glands to release hydrochloric acid and digestive enzymes needed to break down food. It is very similar to the nonruminant stomach.

== Pathology ==
Dairy cattle on high production diets are susceptible to a number of pathologies, most commonly after calving. A gas-filled abomasum can move into an abnormal location and become displaced. If the abomasum displaces to the right, it is at risk of torsion. A displaced abomasum will cause cows to present all or some of the following signs: loss of appetite, decrease rumen contractions, decrease cud-chewing, and drop in milk production. While a displaced abomasum is not immediately life-threatening, veterinary care is required for surgical correction. Milder cases can be corrected by rolling the cow over or forcing her to run up a steep hill. Abomasitis is a relatively rare, but serious, disease of the abomasum whose causes are currently unknown.

== As food ==
The abomasum is used to make the lampredotto, a typical dish of Florence. It is also fried and eaten with onions as part of the Korean dish Makchang gui. Another dish made with the abomasum is the Persian Sirabi-Shirdan (borrowed in Turkey as Şırdan). Chusta (literally abomasum) is a famous dish in Bihar, India. In Japan, it is grilled and served as horumonyaki, this particular type of horumon is known as Akasen.

== See also ==
- Giving of the foreleg, cheeks and abomasum
- Methanogens in digestive tract of ruminants
