= Omasum =

Third stomach compartment in ruminants

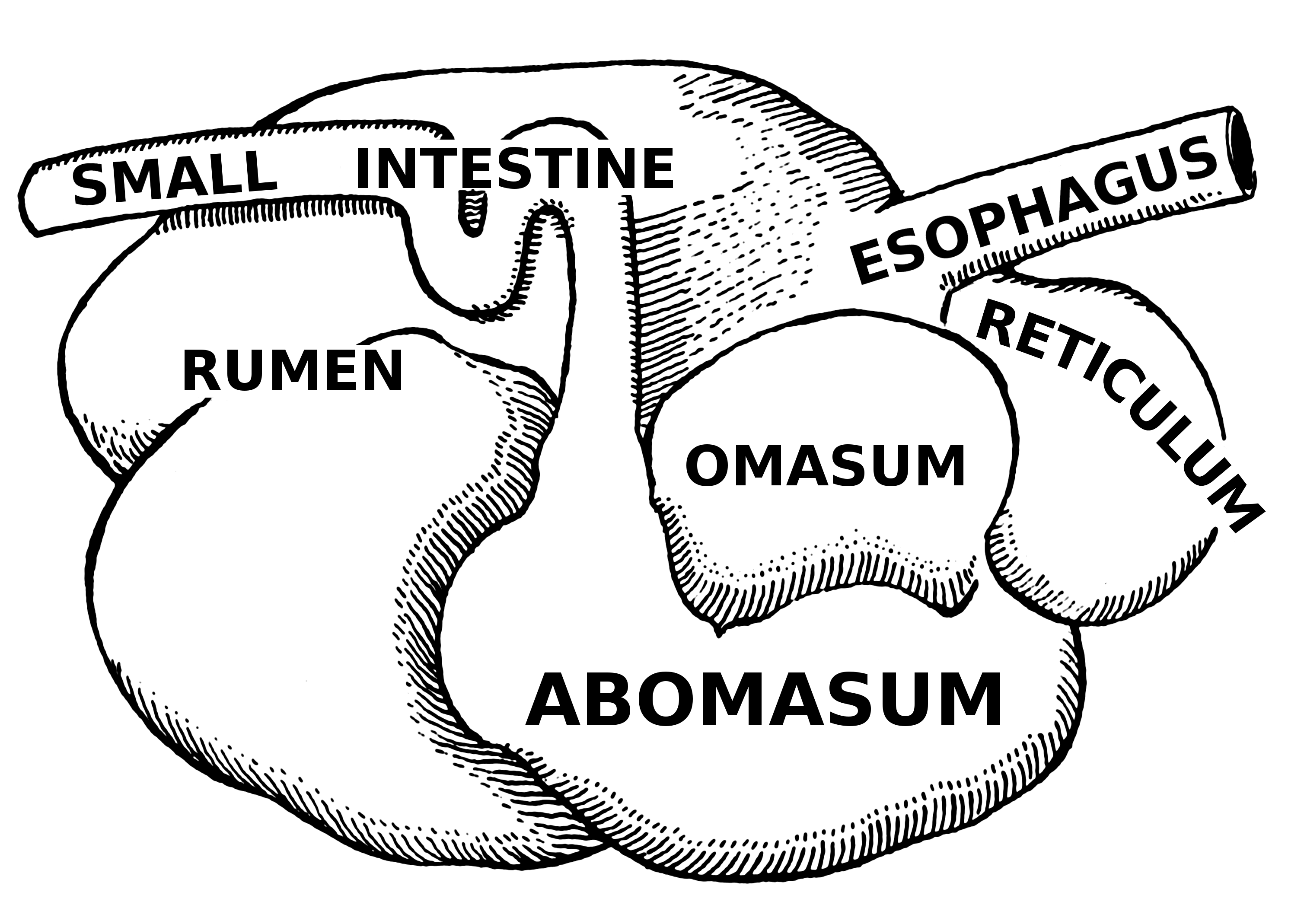
The ruminant digestive system

The omasum, also known as the green, the fardel, the manyplies and the psalterium, is the third compartment of the stomach in ruminants. The omasum comes after the rumen and reticulum and before the abomasum. Different ruminants have different omasum structures and function based on the food that they eat and how they developed through evolution.

== Anatomy ==
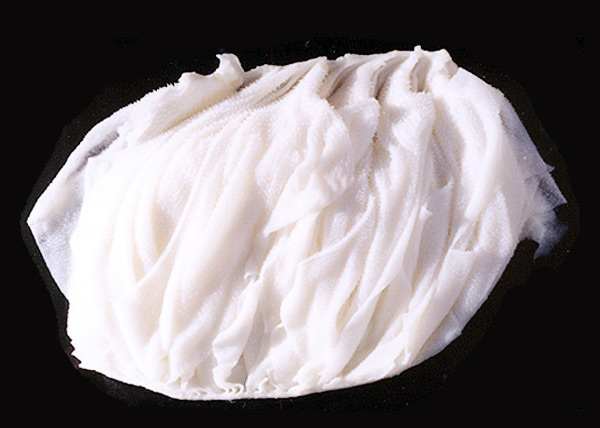
The 'leaflets' of the omasum

The omasum can be found on the right side of the cranial portion of the rumen. It receives food from the reticulum through the reticulo-omasal orifice and provides food to the abomasum through the omaso-abomasal orifice. The omasum is spherical to crescent shape and has multiple leaflets similar to a book, called omasal laminae. The omasal laminae are made of thin muscular layers covered with a nonglandular mucous membrane. The omasal laminae come from the sides of the large curvature and project towards the inside of the omasum, extending from the reticulo-omasal orifice to the omaso-abomasal orifice. They greatly increase the surface area of the omasum. The laminae are covered in omasal papillae that are claw-like in some ruminants or blunt cones in others. These papillae further increase the surface area, and also provide increased friction against the food particles.

== Function ==
The function of the omasum is not completely understood. During the second contraction phase of the reticulum, the reticule-omasal sphincter opens for a few seconds allowing a small volume of finely dispersed and well-fermented ingesta to enter the omasum.

The omasum has two physiological compartments: omasal canal that transfers food from the reticulum to the omasum, and the inter-laminate recesses between the mucosal laminae which provide the area for absorption. The omasum is where food particles that are small enough get transferred into the abomasum for enzymatic digestion. In ruminants with a more sophisticated omasum, the large surface area allows it to play a key role in the absorption of water, electrolytes, volatile fatty acids, minerals, and the fermentation of food.

Young ruminants that are still drinking milk have an esophageal groove that allows milk to bypass the rumen and go straight from the esophagus to the omasum.

== Species differences ==
An early version of the omasum is seen in early ruminants like duikers and muntjacs, where it is little more than a strainer sieve which prevents unchewed foods from entering the abomasum.

The smallest omasum belongs to ruminants that consume high-quality diets like the moose and roe deer, while the largest belongs to those who are unselective grass and roughage eaters like cattle and sheep.

The omasum is not only bigger in grass and roughage eaters, but there is also greater differentiation in the book-like structure, seen as an increase in the number of laminae.

== Culinary uses ==
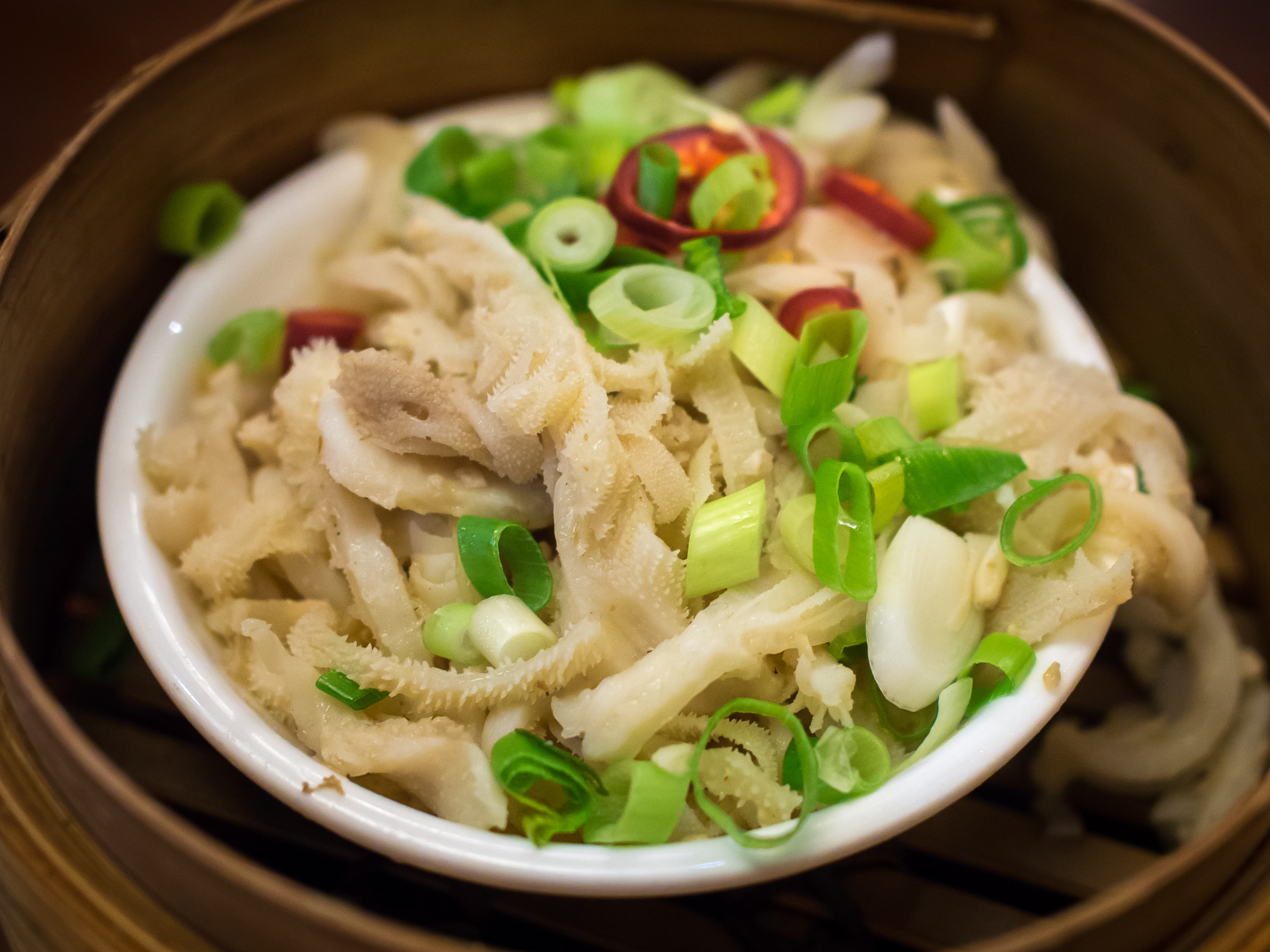
Sliced beef omasum is one of the Chinese dim sum known as ngau pak yip (Chinese: 牛百頁 / 牛柏葉)

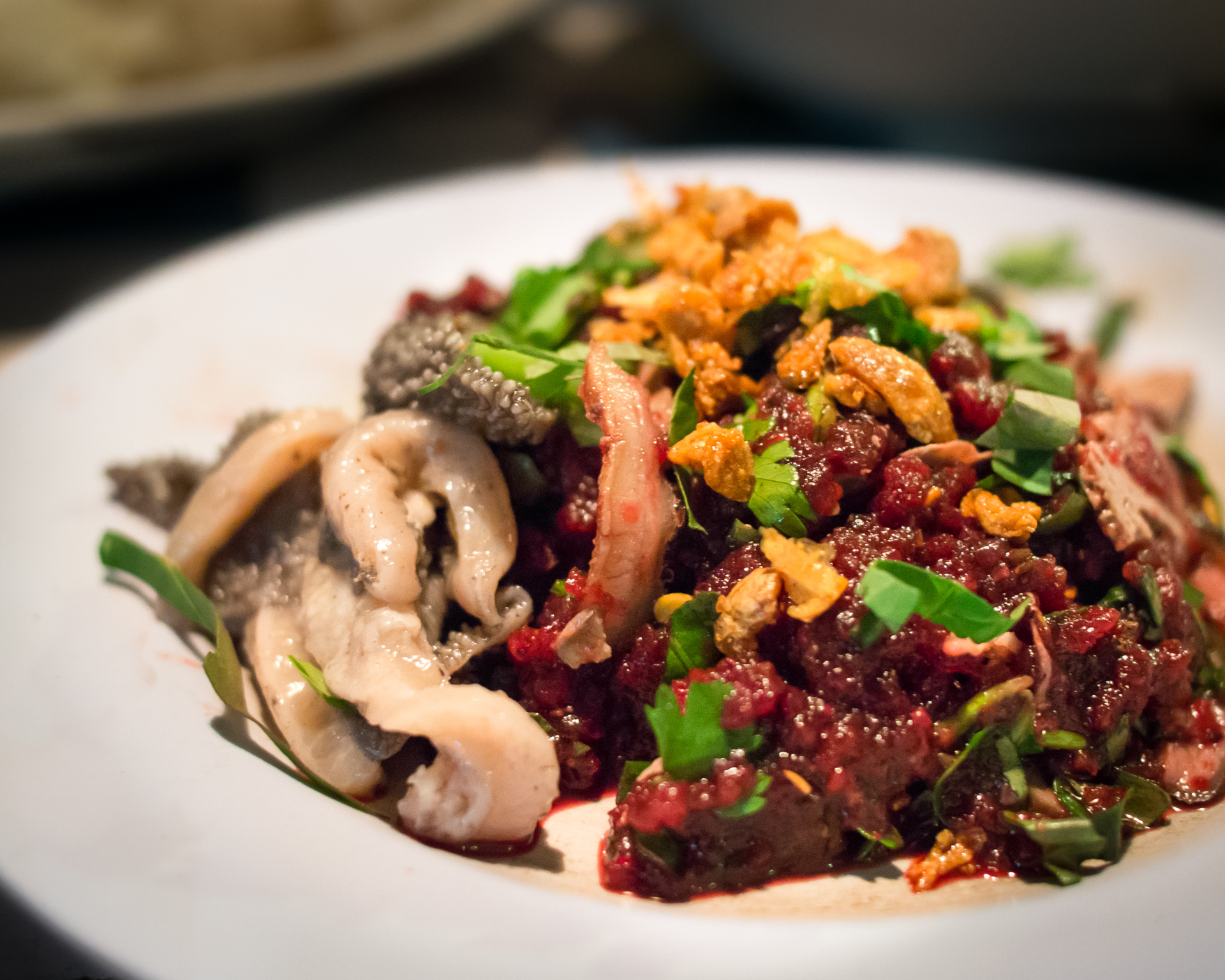
Lap nuea dip is a northern Thai raw beef larb which includes raw beef tripe

== See also ==
- Omasitis
- Methanogens in digestive tract of ruminants
