= List of cervids =

Species in mammal family Cervidae

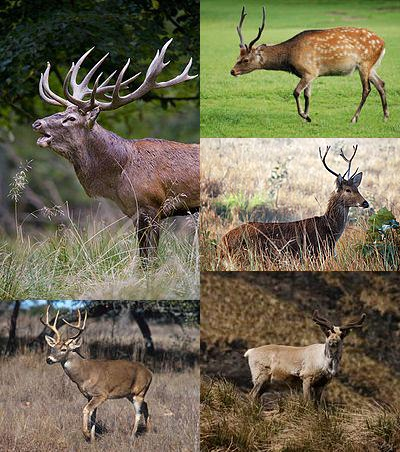
Five cervid species (clockwise from top left): the red deer (Cervus elaphus), sika deer (Cervus nippon), barasingha (Rucervus duvaucelii), reindeer (Rangifer tarandus), white-tailed deer (Odocoileus virginianus)

Cervidae is a family of hoofed ruminant mammals in the order Artiodactyla. A member of this family is called a deer or a cervid. They are widespread throughout North and South America, Europe, and Asia, and are found in a wide variety of biomes. Cervids range in size from the 60 cm (24 in) long and 32 cm (13 in) tall pudú to the 3.4 m (11.2 ft) long and 3.4 m (11.2 ft) tall moose. Most species do not have population estimates, though the roe deer has a population size of approximately 15 million, while several are considered endangered or critically endangered with populations as low as 200. One species, Père David's deer, is extinct in the wild, and one, Schomburgk's deer, became extinct in 1938.

The fifty-five extant species of Cervidae are split into nineteen genera within two subfamilies: Capreolinae (New World deer) and Cervinae (Old World deer). Extinct species have also been placed into Capreolinae and Cervinae. More than one hundred extinct Cervidae species have been discovered, though due to ongoing research and discoveries the exact number and categorization is not fixed.

== Conventions ==
IUCN Red List categories
Conservation status
- EX: Extinct (1 species)
- EW: Extinct in the wild (1 species)
- CR: Critically endangered (2 species)
- EN: Endangered (6 species)
- VU: Vulnerable (16 species)
- NT: Near threatened (4 species)
- LC: Least concern (16 species)

Other categories
- DD: Data deficient (9 species)
- NE: Not evaluated (0 species)

Conservation status codes listed follow the International Union for Conservation of Nature (IUCN) Red List of Threatened Species. Range maps are provided wherever possible; if a range map is not available, a description of the cervid's range is provided. Ranges are based on the IUCN Red List for that species unless otherwise noted. All extinct species or subspecies listed alongside extant species went extinct after 1500 CE, and are indicated by a dagger symbol "†".

== Classification ==
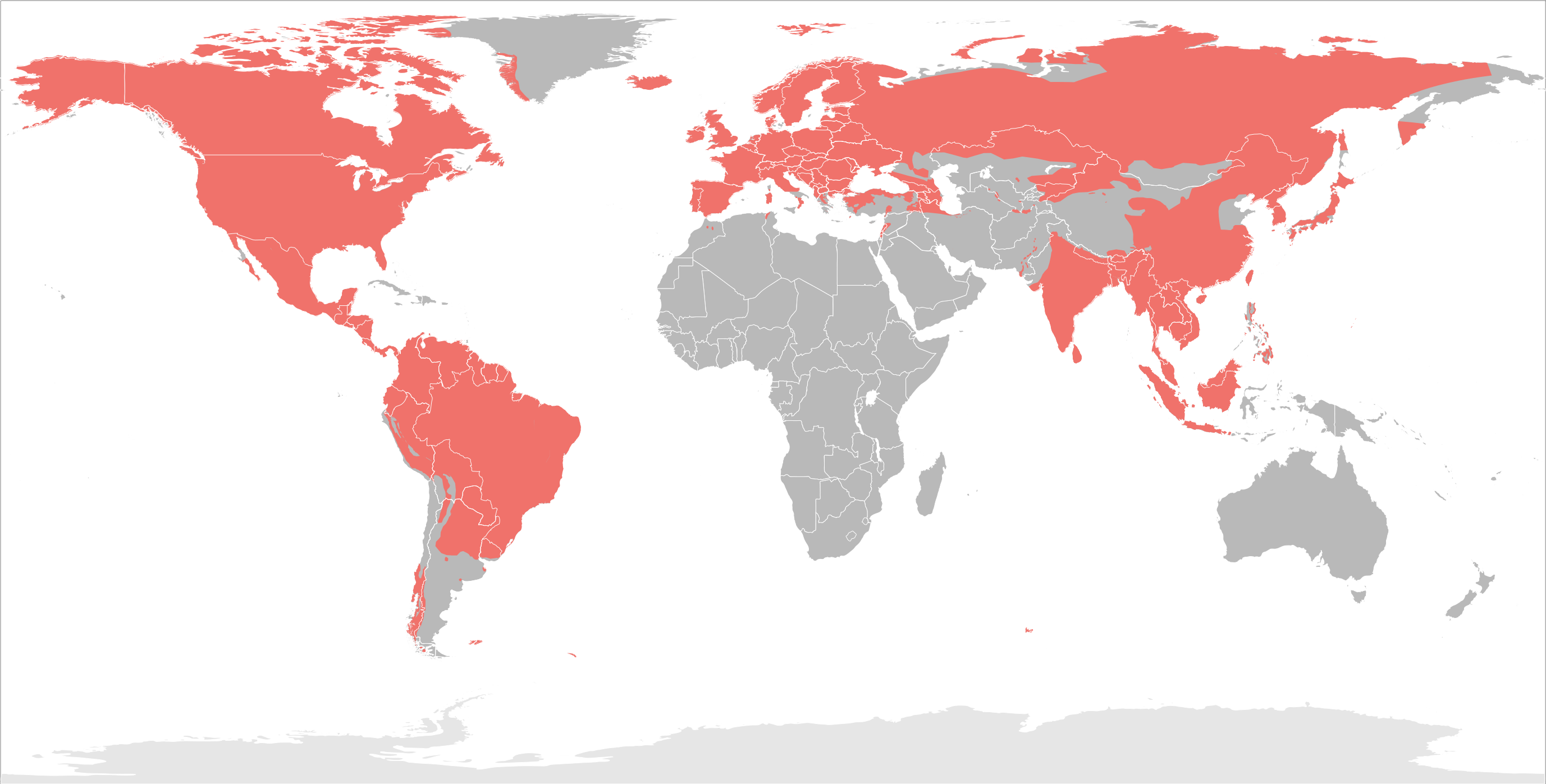
Cervidae distribution

The family Cervidae consists of 55 extant species belonging to 19 genera in 2 subfamilies and divided into dozens of subspecies. This does not include hybrid species or extinct prehistoric species. Additionally, one species, Schomburgk's deer, went extinct in 1938. The classification is based on the molecular phylogeny.

- Subfamily Capreolinae (New World deer)
  - Tribe Alceini
    - Genus Alces: one species
  - Tribe Capreolini
    - Genus Capreolus: two species
    - Genus Hydropotes: one species
  - Tribe Odocoileini
    - Genus Blastocerus: one species
    - Genus Hippocamelus: two species
    - Genus Mazama: nine species
    - Genus Odocoileus: three species
    - Genus Ozotoceros: one species
    - Genus Pudu: two species
    - Genus Rangifer: one species
- Subfamily Cervinae (Old World deer)
  - Tribe Muntiacini
    - Genus Elaphodus: one species
    - Genus Muntiacus: twelve species
  - Tribe Cervini
    - Genus Axis: four species
    - Genus Cervus: five species
    - Genus Dama: two species
    - Genus Elaphurus: one species
    - Genus Panolia: one species
    - Genus Rucervus: two species (one extinct)
    - Genus Rusa: four species

- Cervidae
  - Cervinae
    - Muntiacini
      - Elaphodus
      - Muntiacus
    - Cervini
      - - Dama
        - - - Rusa
            - Cervus
          - - Elaphurus
            - Panolia
      - - Rucervus
        - - Axis
  - Capreolinae
    - Odocoileini
      - Rangifer
      - - - Odocoileus
          - Mazama
          - Blastocerus
          - Hippocamelus
          - Ozotoceros
          - Pudu
    - Capreolini
      - Capreolus
      - Hydropotes
    - Alceini
      Alces

== Cervids ==
The following classification is based on the taxonomy described by Mammal Species of the World (2005), with augmentation by generally accepted proposals made since using molecular phylogenetic analysis. This includes merging the two moose species of Alces into one, splitting out the monotypic Panolia genus from Rucervus, combining the monotypic subfamily Hydropotinae with Capreolinae. There are several additional proposals which are disputed, such as addition of the fair brocket to the Mazama genus, which are not included here.

=== Subfamily Capreolinae ===
==== Tribe Alceini ====
Genus Alces – Gray, 1821 – one species
Common name	Scientific name and subspecies	Range	Size and ecology	IUCN status and estimated population
Moose	A. alces (Linnaeus, 1758) Nine subspecies: A. a. alces (European elk); A. a. americanus (eastern moose); A. a. andersoni (western moose); A. a. buturlini (Chukotka elk); A. a. caucasicus (Caucasian moose)†; A. a. cameloides (Ussuri elk); A. a. gigas (Alaskan moose); A. a. pfizenmayeri (Yakutia elk); A. a. shirasi (Shiras' moose)	North America, Europe, and Asia	Size: 230–340 cm (91–134 in) long, plus 8–12 cm (3–5 in) tail; up to 230 cm (91 in) tall at shoulder Habitat: Forest and inland wetlands Diet: Vegetative parts of trees, as well as shrubs, herbs, and aquatic plants	LC 2,000,000

==== Tribe Capreolini ====
Genus Capreolus – Gray, 1821 – two species
Common name	Scientific name and subspecies	Range	Size and ecology	IUCN status and estimated population
Roe deer	C. capreolus (Linnaeus, 1758) Four subspecies: C. c. canus; C. c. capreolus; C. c. caucasicus; C. c. italicus	Europe	Size: 104–124 cm (41–49 in) long, plus 2–3 cm (1–1 in) tail; 66–84 cm (26–33 in) tall at shoulder Habitat: Forest, shrubland, grassland, and inland wetlands Diet: Wide variety of plants	LC 15,000,000
Siberian roe deer	C. pygargus (Pallas, 1771) Four subspecies: C. p. bedfordi; C. p. mantschuricus; C. p. ochraceus; C. p. pygargus	Central and northeastern Asia	Size: 95–140 cm (37–55 in) long, plus 20–40 cm (8–16 in) tail; 65–95 cm (26–37 in) tall at shoulder Habitat: Forest, shrubland, grassland, and inland wetlands Diet: Grasses	LC Unknown

Genus Hydropotes – R. Swinhoe, 1870 – one species
Common name	Scientific name and subspecies	Range	Size and ecology	IUCN status and estimated population
Water deer	H. inermis Swinhoe, 1870 Two subspecies: H. i. argyropus (Korean water deer); H. i. inermis (Chinese water deer)	East China and Korean peninsula	Size: 89–103 cm (35–41 in) long, plus 6–7 cm (2–3 in) tail; 45–57 cm (18–22 in) tall at shoulder Habitat: Forest, shrubland, grassland, inland wetlands, and intertidal marine Diet: Reeds, coarse grasses, vegetables, and beets	VU Unknown

==== Tribe Odocoileini ====
Genus Blastocerus – Wagner, 1844 – one species
Common name	Scientific name and subspecies	Range	Size and ecology	IUCN status and estimated population
Marsh deer	B. dichotomus (Illiger, 1815)	Scattered parts of central South America (former range in red)	Size: 153–191 cm (60–75 in) long, plus 12–16 cm (5–6 in) tail; 110–127 cm (43–50 in) tall at shoulder Habitat: Savanna, shrubland, and inland wetlands Diet: Grasses, reeds and aquatic plants, as well as shrubs and vines	VU Unknown

Genus Hippocamelus – Leuckart, 1816 – two species
Common name	Scientific name and subspecies	Range	Size and ecology	IUCN status and estimated population
South Andean deer	H. bisulcus (Molina, 1782)	Southern Andes mountains	Size: 144–156 cm (57–61 in) long, plus 12–13 cm (5–5 in) tail; 80–90 cm (31–35 in) tall at shoulder Habitat: Forest, shrubland, grassland, inland wetlands, rocky areas, and desert Diet: Varied range of grasses and other plants	EN 1,000–1,500
Taruca	H. antisensis (d'Orbigny, 1834)	Andes mountains	Size: 69–77 cm (27–30 in) tall at shoulder Habitat: Shrubland, grassland, rocky areas, and other Diet: Sedges and grasses	VU 4,200–5,700

Genus Mazama – Rafinesque, 1817 – nine species
Common name	Scientific name and subspecies	Range	Size and ecology	IUCN status and estimated population
Amazonian brown brocket	M. nemorivaga (F. Cuvier, 1817)	Northern and central South America	Size: 75–100 cm (30–39 in) long, plus 6–11 cm (2–4 in) tail; 50 cm (20 in) tall at shoulder Habitat: Forest and shrubland Diet: Fruit, as well as leaves and shoots	LC Unknown
Central American red brocket	M. temama (Kerr, 1792) Three subspecies: M. t. cerasina; M. t. reperticia; M. t. temama	Central America	Size: 80–110 cm (31–43 in) long, plus 10–14 cm (4–6 in) tail; 60–70 cm (24–28 in) tall at shoulder Habitat: Forest, shrubland, grassland, and inland wetlands Diet: Fruit, as well as seeds, grass, shoots, vines, and sometimes crops such as beans	DD Unknown
Dwarf brocket	M. chunyi Hershkovitz, 1959	Central Andes mountains	Size: About 70 cm (28 in) long; about 38 cm (15 in) tall at shoulder Habitat: Forest, shrubland, and grassland Diet: Fruit and shrubs	VU Unknown
Gray brocket	M. gouazoubira (Fischer von Waldheim, 1814) Eleven subspecies: M. g. cita; M. g. gouazoubira; M. g. medemi; M. g. mexianae; M. g. murelia; M. g. nemorivaga; M. g. permira; M. g. sanctaemartae; M. g. rondoni; M. g. superciliaris; M. g. tschudii	Eastern South America	Size: 85–105 cm (33–41 in) long Habitat: Forest, savanna, shrubland, and inland wetlands Diet: Wide variety of plants as well as fruit	LC Unknown
Little red brocket	M. rufina (Bourcier, Pucheran, 1852)	Northern Andes mountains	Size: About 78 cm (31 in) long, plus 8 cm (3 in) tail; about 45 cm (18 in) tall at shoulder Habitat: Forest, shrubland, and grassland Diet: Herbs as well as other plants	VU Unknown
Mérida brocket	M. bricenii Thomas, 1908	Northern Andes mountains	Size: 80–95 cm (31–37 in) long, plus 8–9 cm (3–4 in) tail; 45–50 cm (18–20 in) tall at shoulder Habitat: Forest, shrubland, grassland, and rocky areas Diet: Fruit and shrubs	VU Unknown
Pygmy brocket	M. nana (Hensel, 1872)	Southeastern South America (possible range in yellow)	Size: About 78 cm (31 in) long, plus 8 cm (3 in) tail; less than 50 cm (20 in) tall at shoulder Habitat: Forest Diet: Unknown	VU Unknown
Red brocket	M. americana (Erxleben, 1777) Twelve subspecies: M. a. americana; M. a. carrikeri; M. a. gualea; M. a. jucunda; M. a. rosii; M. a. rufa; M. a. sarae; M. a. sheila; M. a. trinitatis; M. a. whitelyi; M. a. zamora; M. a. zetta	Northern and central South America	Size: 103–146 cm (41–57 in) long, plus 8–15 cm (3–6 in) tail; 65–80 cm (26–31 in) tall at shoulder Habitat: Forest Diet: Fruit and shrubs	DD Unknown
Small red brocket	M. bororo Duarte, 1996	Atlantic Forest in southeastern Brazil (possible range in yellow)	Size: 85 cm (33 in) long, plus 11–14 cm (4–6 in) tail; 50–60 cm (20–24 in) tall at shoulder Habitat: Forest Diet: Fruit, leaves, and sprouts	VU 8,500

Genus Odocoileus – Rafinesque, 1832 – three species
Common name	Scientific name and subspecies	Range	Size and ecology	IUCN status and estimated population
Mule deer	O. hemionus (Rafinesque, 1817) Ten subspecies: O. h. californicus (California mule deer); O. h. cerrosensis (Cedros Island mule deer); O. h. columbianus (Black-tailed deer); O. h. eremicus (desert mule deer); O. h. fuliginatus (southern mule deer); O. h. hemionus (Rocky Mountain mule deer); O. h. inyoensis (Inyo mule deer); O. h. peninsulae (peninsular mule deer); O. h. sheldoni (Tiburon Island mule deer); O. h. sitkensis (Sitka deer)	Western North America	Size: 152–203 cm (60–80 in) long; 80–106 cm (31–42 in) tall at shoulder Habitat: Forest, savanna, shrubland, grassland, inland wetlands, desert, and intertidal marine Diet: Leaves, twigs, acorns, legume seeds, and fleshy fruits	LC Unknown
Yucatan brown brocket	O. pandora (Merriam, 1901)	Yucatán Peninsula	Size: About 105 cm (41 in) long, plus 8 cm (3 in) tail Habitat: Forest, shrubland, and grassland Diet: Fruit, as well as other plants	VU Unknown
White-tailed deer	O. virginianus (Rafinesque, 1832) 38 subspecies: O. v. acapulcensis; O. v. borealis (northern white-tailed deer); O. v. cariacou; O. v. carminis (Carmen Mountains white-tailed deer); O. v. chiriquensis; O. v. clavium (Key deer); O. v. couesi (Coues' white-tailed deer); O. v. curassavicus; O. v. dacotensis (Dakota white-tailed deer); O. v. goudotii; O. v. gymnotis (South American white-tailed deer); O. v. hiltonensis (Hilton Head white-tailed deer); O. v. leucurus (Columbian white-tailed deer); O. v. macrourus (Kansas white-tailed deer); O. v. margaritae; O. v. mcilhennyi (Avery Island white-tailed deer); O. v. mexicanus; O. v. miquihuanensis; O. v. nelsoni; O. v. nemoralis (Nicaraguan white-tailed deer); O. v. nigribarbis (Blackbeard Island white-tailed deer); O. v. oaxacensis; O. v. ochrourus (northwestern white-tailed deer); O. v. osceola (Florida coastal white-tailed deer); O. v. peruvianus (South American white-tailed deer); O. v. rothschildi; O. v. seminolus (Florida white-tailed deer); O. v. sinaloae; O. v. taurinsulae (Bulls Island white-tailed deer); O. v. texanus (Texas white-tailed deer); O. v. thomasi; O. v. toltecus; O. v. tropicalis; O. v. ustus; O. v. venatorius (Hunting Island white-tailed deer); O. v. veraecrucis; O. v. virginianus (Virginia white-tailed deer); O. v. yucatanensis	North America and northern South America	Size: 150–200 cm (59–79 in) long, plus 10–28 cm (4–11 in) tail Habitat: Forest, savanna, shrubland, grassland, inland wetlands, desert, neritic marine, intertidal marine, and coastal marine Diet: Wide variety of vegetation and grasses	LC Unknown

Genus Ozotoceros – Ameghino, 1891 – one species
Common name	Scientific name and subspecies	Range	Size and ecology	IUCN status and estimated population
Pampas deer	O. bezoarticus (Linnaeus, 1758) Five subspecies: O. b. arerunguaensis; O. b. bezoarticus; O. b. celer; O. b. leucogaster; O. b. uruguayensis	Scattered central South America	Size: 110–140 cm (43–55 in) long; 70–75 cm (28–30 in) tall at shoulder Habitat: Savanna, grassland, and inland wetlands Diet: Grasses and shrubs	NT 20,000–80,000

Genus Pudu – Gray, 1852 – two species
Common name	Scientific name and subspecies	Range	Size and ecology	IUCN status and estimated population
Northern pudú	P. mephistophiles (Winton, 1896)	Northern Andes mountains	Size: 60–85 cm (24–33 in) long plus 3–5 cm (1–2 in) tail; 32–35 cm (13–14 in) tall at shoulder Habitat: Forest, shrubland, and grassland Diet: Leaves of ferns, trees, vines, herbs and shrubs	DD Unknown
Southern pudú	P. puda (Molina, 1782)	Southern Andes mountains	Size: 60–85 cm (24–33 in) long plus 3–5 cm (1–2 in) tail; 35–45 cm (14–18 in) tall at shoulder Habitat: Forest and shrubland Diet: Leaves of ferns, trees, vines, herbs and shrubs	NT Unknown

Genus Rangifer – H. Smith, 1827 – one species
Common name	Scientific name and subspecies	Range	Size and ecology	IUCN status and estimated population
Reindeer	R. tarandus (Linnaeus, 1758) Fourteen subspecies: R. t. buskensis (Busk reindeer); R. t. caboti (Labrador caribou); R. t. caribou (Boreal woodland caribou); R. t. dawsoni (Queen Charlotte Islands caribou); R. t. fennicus (Finnish forest reindeer); R. t. groenlandicus (barren-ground caribou); R. t. osborni (Osborn's caribou); R. t. pearsoni (Novaya Zemlya reindeer); R. t. pearyi (Peary caribou); R. t. phylarchus (Kamchatkan reindeer); R. t. platyrhynchus (Svalbard reindeer); R. t. sibiricus (Siberian tundra reindeer); R. t. tarandus (mountain reindeer); R. t. terraenovae (Newfoundland caribou)	Arctic North America, Europe, and Asia	Size: 150–230 cm (59–91 in) long; up to 120 cm (47 in) tall at shoulder Habitat: Forest and grassland Diet: Lichen, forbs, sedges, grasses, and shrubs	VU 2,890,000

=== Subfamily Cervinae ===
==== Tribe Muntiacini ====
Genus Elaphodus – H. Milne-Edwards, 1872 – one species
Common name	Scientific name and subspecies	Range	Size and ecology	IUCN status and estimated population
Tufted deer	E. cephalophus H. Milne-Edwards, 1872 Four subspecies: E. c. cephalophus; E. c. fociensis; E. c. ichangensis; E. c. michianus	Central China and northeastern Myanmar	Size: 110–160 cm (43–63 in) long, plus 7–16 cm (3–6 in) tail; 50–70 cm (20–28 in) tall at shoulder Habitat: Forest and shrubland Diet: Grass, as well as shrubs, fruits, bamboo, and herbs	NT Unknown

Genus Muntiacus – Rafinesque, 1815 – twelve species
Common name	Scientific name and subspecies	Range	Size and ecology	IUCN status and estimated population
Bornean yellow muntjac	M. atherodes Groves, Grubb, 1982	Borneo	Size: 90–100 cm (35–39 in) long, plus 14–20 cm (6–8 in) tail; 65 cm (26 in) tall at shoulder Habitat: Forest Diet: Herbs, seeds, grass, buds, leaves, and fruit	NT Unknown
Fea's muntjac	M. feae (Thomas, Doria, 1889)	Southern Myanmar and Thailand	Size: 90–100 cm (35–39 in) long, plus 10–17 cm (4–7 in) tail; 50–60 cm (20–24 in) tall at shoulder Habitat: Forest Diet: Fruit and leaves, as well as grass and shoots	DD Unknown
Giant muntjac	M. vuquangensis (Tuoc, Dung, Dawson, Arctander, & Mackinnon, 1994)	Northern Vietnam and Laos	Size: 110–115 cm (43–45 in) long, plus 17 cm (7 in) tail; 65–70 cm (26–28 in) tall at shoulder Habitat: Forest Diet: Fruit and leaves	CR Unknown
Gongshan muntjac	M. gongshanensis Ma, 1990	South-central China	Size: 95–105 cm (37–41 in) long, plus 9–16 cm (4–6 in) tail; 55–57 cm (22–22 in) tall at shoulder Habitat: Forest Diet: Unknown	DD Unknown
Hairy-fronted muntjac	M. crinifrons (P. L. Sclater, 1885)	Southeastern China	Size: 98–113 cm (39–44 in) long, plus 21 cm (8 in) tail Habitat: Forest and shrubland Diet: Wide variety of tree leaves and twigs, forbs, grass, and fruit	VU Unknown
Leaf muntjac	M. putaoensis Amato, Egan & Rabinowitz, 1999	Myanmar	Size: 77–83 cm (30–33 in) long, plus 8–12 cm (3–5 in) tail; 50 cm (20 in) tall at shoulder Habitat: Forest Diet: Fruit and a range of plant materials	DD Unknown
Northern red muntjac	M. vaginalis (Boddaert, 1785)	Southern and Southeast Asia	Size: 89–135 cm (35–53 in) long, plus 13–23 cm (5–9 in) tail; 40–65 cm (16–26 in) tall at shoulder Habitat: Forest Diet: Fruit, buds, tender leaves, flowers, herbs, and young grass	LC Unknown
Pu Hoat muntjac	M. puhoatensis Trai, 1997	Vietnam	Size: Small and similar to the Truong Son muntjac, but specific measurements not available Habitat: Forest Diet: Unknown	DD Unknown
Reeves's muntjac	M. reevesi (Ogilby, 1839) Three subspecies: M. r. jiangkouensis; M. r. micrurus; M. r. reevesi	Eastern China; introduced to Britain (in purple)	Size: 70–113 cm (28–44 in) long, plus 10 cm (4 in) tail; 43–45 cm (17–18 in) tall at shoulder Habitat: Forest, shrubland, and grassland Diet: Bamboo, seeds, bark, fruit and foliage, as well as eggs, carrion, small mammals, and ground-nesting birds	LC Unknown
Roosevelt's muntjac	M. rooseveltorum Osgood, 1932	Map of range	Size: Small with shoulder height estimated at about 40 cm (16 in), but specific measurements not available Habitat: Forest Diet: Leaves and fruit	DD Unknown
Southern red muntjac	M. muntjak (Zimmermann, 1780)	Southeast Asia	Size: 89–135 cm (35–53 in) long, plus 13–23 cm (5–9 in) tail; 40–65 cm (16–26 in) tall at shoulder Habitat: Forest Diet: Fruit, buds, tender leaves, flowers, herbs, and young grass	LC Unknown
Truong Son muntjac	M. truongsonensis (Giao, Tuoc, Dung, Wikramanayake, Amato, Arctander, & Mackinnon, 1997)	Southern Vietnam	Size: Small with shoulder height estimated at about 40 cm (16 in), but specific measurements not available Habitat: Forest Diet: Leaves and fruit	DD Unknown

==== Tribe Cervini ====
Genus Axis – H. Smith, 1827 – four species
Common name	Scientific name and subspecies	Range	Size and ecology	IUCN status and estimated population
Chital	A. axis (Erxleben, 1777)	Indian subcontinent	Size: 70 cm (28 in) long plus 20 cm (8 in) tail; 35–38 cm (14–15 in) tall at shoulder Habitat: Forest, savanna, and grassland Diet: Wide variety of grasses as well as fallen leaves, flowers, and fruit	LC Unknown
Calamian deer	A. calamianensis (Heude, 1888)	Calamian Islands of the Philippines	Size: 100–175 cm (39–69 in) long, plus 12–38 cm (5–15 in) tail; 60–100 cm (24–39 in) tall at shoulder Habitat: Forest, savanna, and grassland Diet: Leaves	EN Unknown
Bawean deer	A. kuhlii (Temminck, 1836)	Bawean island of Indonesia	Size: 100–175 cm (39–69 in) long Habitat: Forest and grassland Diet: Herbs and grasses, as well as young leaves and twigs	CR 200–500
Indian hog deer	A. porcinus (Zimmermann, 1780)	Southern and southeast Asia	Size: 105–115 cm (41–45 in) long, plus 20 cm (8 in) tail; 60–72 cm (24–28 in) tall at shoulder Habitat: Savanna, shrubland, grassland, and inland wetlands Diet: Young grasses, as well as herbs, flowers, fruit, and shrubs	EN Unknown

Genus Cervus – Linnaeus, 1758 – five species
Common name	Scientific name and subspecies	Range	Size and ecology	IUCN status and estimated population
Thorold's deer	C. albirostris Przhevalsky, 1883	Central China	Size: 155–210 cm (61–83 in) long, plus 10–13 cm (4–5 in) tail; 115–140 cm (45–55 in) tall at shoulder Habitat: Forest, shrubland, and grassland Diet: Grass, herbs, lichens, leaves, and bark of trees and bushes	VU Unknown
Elk	C. canadensis Erxleben, 1777 Thirteen subspecies: C. c. alashanicus (Alashan wapiti); C. c. canadensis (eastern elk)†; C. c. kansuensis (Kansu red deer); C. c. macneilli (Sichuan deer); C. c. manitobensis (Manitoban elk); C. c. merriami (Merriam's elk)†; C. c. nannodes (Tule elk); C. c. nelsoni (Rocky Mountain elk); C. c. roosevelti (Roosevelt elk); C. c. sibiricus (Altai wapiti); C. c. songaricus (Tian Shan wapiti); C. c. wallichii (Tibetan red deer); C. c. xanthopygus (Manchurian wapiti)	North America and Asia (former range in light green)	Size: 210–280 cm (83–110 in) long plus 10–22 cm (4–9 in) tail; 120–175 cm (47–69 in) tall at shoulder Habitat: Forest, shrubland, and grassland Diet: Shrub and tree shoots, as well as grasses, sedges, and shrubs	LC Unknown
Red deer	C. elaphus Linnaeus, 1758 Nine subspecies: C. e. atlanticus (Norwegian red deer); C. e. barbarus (Barbary stag); C. e. brauneri (Crimean red deer); C. e. corsicanus (Corsican red deer); C. e. elaphus; C. e. hispanicus (Spanish red deer); C. e. maral (Caspian red deer); C. e. nannodes; C. e. pannoniensis	Europe and western Asia (former range in light green)	Size: 160–270 cm (63–106 in) long; 75–150 cm (30–59 in) tall at shoulder Habitat: Forest, shrubland, grassland, and rocky areas Diet: Shrub and tree shoots, as well as grasses, sedges, shrubs, fruit, and seeds	LC Unknown
Central Asian red deer	C. hanglu Wagner, 1844 Three subspecies: C. h. bactrianus (Bactrian deer); C. h. hanglu (Kashmir stag); C. h. yarkandensis (Yarkand deer)	Central Asia	Size: Habitat: Forest, shrubland, grassland, and inland wetlands Diet: Branches of young deciduous trees	LC 2,000-2,500
Sika deer	C. nippon Temminck, 1838 Sixteen subspecies: C. n. aplodontus; C. n. grassianus (Shanxi sika deer); C. n. hortulorum; C. n. keramae (Kerama deer); C. n. kopschi (South China sika deer); C. n. mageshimae; C. n. mandarinus (North China sika deer); C. n. mantchuricus (Manchurian sika deer); C. n. nippon; C. n. pseudaxis (Vietnamese sika deer); C. n. pulchellus; C. n. sichuanicus (Sichuan sika deer); C. n. soloensis; C. n. taiouanus (Formosan sika deer); C. n. yakushimae; C. n. yesoensis (Yezo sika deer)	East Asia	Size: 95–180 cm (37–71 in) long plus 7–13 cm (3–5 in) tail; 64–109 cm (25–43 in) tall at shoulder Habitat: Forest, shrubland, and grassland Diet: Grass, as well as shrubs and fruit	LC Unknown

Genus Dama – Frisch, 1775 – two species
Common name	Scientific name and subspecies	Range	Size and ecology	IUCN status and estimated population
European fallow deer	D. dama (Linnaeus, 1758)	Europe and west Asia; introduced scattered areas worldwide (in teal)	Size: 130–175 cm (51–69 in) long, plus 15–23 cm (6–9 in) tail; 90–100 cm (35–39 in) tall at shoulder Habitat: Forest, shrubland, and grassland Diet: Grasses, mast, and shrubs, as well as leaves, buds, shoots, and bark	LC Unknown
Persian fallow deer	D. mesopotamica (Brooke, 1875)	Iran and Israel	Size: 130–175 cm (51–69 in) long, plus 15–23 cm (6–9 in) tail; 90–100 cm (35–39 in) tall at shoulder Habitat: Forest, savanna, and shrubland Diet: Grasses, mast, and shrubs, as well as leaves, buds, shoots, and bark	EN Unknown

Genus Elaphurus – H. Milne-Edwards, 1872 – one species
Common name	Scientific name and subspecies	Range	Size and ecology	IUCN status and estimated population
Père David's deer	E. davidianus Milne-Edwards, 1866	China	Size: 183–216 cm (72–85 in) long, plus 22–36 cm (9–14 in) tail Habitat: Grassland, inland wetlands, and intertidal marine Diet: Grass, reeds, and bush leaves	EW Unknown

Genus Panolia – McClelland, 1842 – one species
Common name	Scientific name and subspecies	Range	Size and ecology	IUCN status and estimated population
Eld's deer	P. eldii (McClelland, 1842) Three subspecies: P. e. eldii (Sangai); P. e. siamensis (Burmese brow-antlered deer); P. e. thamin (Thai brow-antlered deer)	Scattered parts of southeast Asia	Size: 140–170 cm (55–67 in) long, plus 22–25 cm (9–10 in) tail; 90–130 cm (35–51 in) tall at shoulder Habitat: Forest, savanna, shrubland, grassland, and inland wetlands Diet: A variety of grasses, fruit, and herbaceous and wetland plants	EN Unknown

Genus Rucervus – Hodgson, 1838 – two species
Common name	Scientific name and subspecies	Range	Size and ecology	IUCN status and estimated population
Barasingha	R. duvaucelii (Cuvier, 1823) Three subspecies: R. d. branderi (southern swamp deer); R. d. duvaucelii (western swamp deer); R. d. ranjitsinhi (eastern swamp deer)	Scattered parts of south Asia (historical range in yellow)	Size: About 180 cm (71 in) long; 119–124 cm (47–49 in) tall at shoulder Habitat: Forest, savanna, grassland, and inland wetlands Diet: Grass and aquatic plants	VU Unknown
Schomburgk's deer†	R. schomburgki Blyth, 1863	Central Thailand	Size: Unknown Habitat: Grassland and inland wetlands Diet: Unknown	EX 0

Genus Rusa – H. Smith, 1827 – four species
Common name	Scientific name and subspecies	Range	Size and ecology	IUCN status and estimated population
Visayan spotted deer	R. alfredi (P. L. Sclater, 1870)	Philippines	Size: 120–130 cm (47–51 in) long, plus 8–13 cm (3–5 in) tail; 60–80 cm (24–31 in) tall at shoulder Habitat: Forest, shrubland, and grassland Diet: Cogon grass and young leaves and buds	EN 700
Philippine deer	R. marianna (Desmarest, 1822) Four subspecies: R. m. barandana; R. m. marianna; R. m. nigella; R. m. nigricans	Philippines	Size: 100–151 cm (39–59 in) long; 55–70 cm (22–28 in) tall at shoulder Habitat: Forest and grassland Diet: Grass	VU Unknown
Javan rusa	R. timorensis (Blainville, 1822) Seven subspecies: R. t. djonga; R. t. floresiensis (Flores rusa deer); R. t. macassaricus (Celebes rusa deer); R. t. moluccensis (Moluccan rusa deer); R. t. renschi; R. t. russa (Javan rusa deer); R. t. timorensis (Timor rusa deer)	Indonesia and East Timor	Size: 142–185 cm (56–73 in) long, plus 10–30 cm (4–12 in) tail; 80–110 cm (31–43 in) tall at shoulder Habitat: Forest, savanna, and grassland Diet: Grass, herbs, the leaves and bark of shrubs, and seaweed	VU 10,000
Sambar deer	R. unicolor (Kerr, 1792) Seven subspecies: R. u. brookei (Bornean sambar); R. u. cambojensis (mainland Southeast Asian sambar); R. u. dejeani (South China sambar); R. u. equina (Malayan sambar); R. u. hainana (Hainan sambar); R. u. swinhoii (Formosan sambar); R. u. unicolor (Sri Lankan sambar)	South and Southeast Asia including Southern China	Size: 160–270 cm (63–106 in) long, plus 25–30 cm (10–12 in) tail; 102–160 cm (40–63 in) tall at shoulder Habitat: Forest, savanna, shrubland, grassland, and inland wetlands Diet: Wide variety of plants	VU Unknown

== See also ==
- Largest cervids

== Sources ==
- Armstrong, David M.; Fitzgerald, James P.; Meaney, Carron A. (2011). Mammals of Colorado (2nd ed.). University Press of Colorado. ISBN 978-1-60732-048-7.
- Burt, William Henry (1957). Mammals of the Great Lakes Region. University of Michigan Press. ISBN 978-0-472-06183-9.
- Ellis, Richard (2004). No Turning Back: The Life and Death of Animal Species. New York: Harper Perennial. ISBN 0-06-055804-0.
- Emanoil, Mary, ed. (1994). Encyclopedia of Endangered Species. Vol. 1. Gale Research. ISBN 978-0-8103-8857-4.
- Eisenberg, John F.; Redford, Kent H.; Reid, Fiona; Bonner, Sigrid James (1989). Mammals of the Neotropics. Vol. 2: The Southern Cone: Chile, Argentina, Uruguay, Paraguay. University of Chicago Press. ISBN 978-0-226-19542-1.
- Eisenberg, John F.; Redford, Kent H.; Reid, Fiona; Bonner, Sigrid James (1989). Mammals of the Neotropics. Vol. 3: Ecuador, Bolivia, Brazil. University of Chicago Press. ISBN 978-0-226-19542-1.
- Geist, Valerius (1998). Deer of the World: Their Evolution, Behaviour, and Ecology. Stackpole Books. ISBN 978-0-8117-0496-0.
- Long, John L. (2003). Introduced Mammals of the World: Their History, Distribution and Influence. CABI Publishing. ISBN 978-0-643-06714-1.
- Reid, Fiona (2009). A Field Guide to the Mammals of Central America and Southeast Mexico (2nd ed.). Oxford University Press. ISBN 978-0-19-534322-9.
- Schaller, George B. (2009). The Deer and the Tiger: Study of Wild Life in India. University of Chicago Press. ISBN 978-0-226-73657-0.
- Smith, Andrew T.; Xie, Yan, eds. (2013). Mammals of China. Princeton University Press. ISBN 978-1-4008-4688-7.
- Wilson, Don E.; Mittermeier, Russell A., eds. (2011). Handbook of the Mammals of the World. Vol. 2 (Hoofed Mammals). Lynx Edicions. ISBN 978-84-96553-77-4.
