= List of even-toed ungulates by population =

This is a list of even-toed ungulate species by estimated global population. This list is not comprehensive, as not all ungulates have had their numbers quantified. Note that this is only a subset of the order Artiodactyla, listing terrestrial species only. For populations of the cetaceans (infraorder Cetacea), see list of cetaceans.

Where available, population is given as number of mature individuals following IUCN reporting standards of estimating effective population size.

== Wild species by population ==
Common name	Binomial name	Population	Status	Trend	Notes	Image
Kouprey	Bos sauveli	0-50	CR	▼	Last confirmed sighting occurred in 1970. Most likely extinct.	
Saola	Pseudoryx nghetinhensis	25-750	CR	▼	Best estimate for number of mature individuals is 50-300. It is possible that species has fallen below the minimum viable population.	
Addax	Addax nasomaculatus	30–90	CR	▼	Total population is estimated to be < 100 individuals.	
Dama gazelle	Nanger dama	45 – 78	CR	▼	All extant subpopulations have fewer than 50 mature individuals.	
Pygmy hog	Porcula salvania	100-250	EN	?	Values given are for mature population. Approximately 100 captive individuals have been reintroduced to the wild.	
Scimitar oryx (Scimitar-horned oryx)	Oryx dammah	140-160	EN	▲	Values given are absolute minimum for mature, wild individuals. Total population is estimated to be 227–1,452 individuals in Chad, and an additional 200 in Tunisia. Approximately 15,000 individuals are held in captivity.	
Hirola	Beatragus hunteri	200-250	CR	▼	Values given are for mature population.	
Bawean deer	Axis kuhlii	200–500	CR	Steady	Values given are estimates of total population.	
Tamaraw	Bubalus mindorensis	220-300	CR	▼	Total population is estimated to be at least 430 individuals.	
Persian fallow deer	Dama mesopotamica	>250	EN	▲	Previously thought to be extinct. Value given is total estimated number of adults. There are approximately 430 individuals held in captivity.	
Rhim gazelle (Slender-horned gazelle)	Gazella leptoceros	300-600	EN	▼	Per IUCN assessment, it "is highly unlikely that the remaining population numbers more than a few hundred."	
Togian babirusa (Togian Islands babirusa)	Babyrousa togeanensis	500	EN	▼	Value given is maximum estimate for total population (2008), though interviews with local residents indicate population could be higher.	
Walia ibex	Capra walie	585	VU	▲	Total population is estimated to be 975 individuals.	
Père David's deer	Elaphurus davidianus	600	EW	N/A	Value given is for population of individuals living in the wild after escaping captivity, ca. 2015. More recent estimates give feral population of 2,825 individuals and a total population (including captivity) of 9,062 individuals.	
Eld's deer	Rucervus eldii	< 700	EN	▼	Population could be higher, but remaining populations are expected to be sparsely distributed across range.	
Visayan spotted deer (Philippine spotted deer)	Rusa alfredi	700	EN	▼	Total population is estimated to be 1,100 individuals.	
Anhui musk deer	Moschus anhuiensis	700–800	EN	▼	Most recent estimate was in 1998.	
Wild Bactrian camel	Camelus ferus	780–1,380	EN	▼	Total population is estimated to be 1,040–1,840 individuals.	
Arabian oryx	Oryx leucoryx	850	VU	Steady	Total population in wild is estimated to be 1,220 individuals. This estimate does not include individuals in captivity (ca. 6,000-7,000).	
Calamian deer	Axis calamianensis	887–1,359	EN	▼	1994 estimate of total population; has almost certainly decreased.	
South Andean deer (Patagonian huemul)	Hippocamelus bisulcus	1048–1500	EN	▼	Maximum estimate for total population is 1,500 individuals.	
Przewalski's gazelle	Procapra przewalskii	1,320-1,635	EN	▲	Values given are for total population.	
Abbott's duiker	Cephalophus spadix	1500	EN	▼	Maximum estimate for total population.	
Mountain nyala	Tragelaphus buxtoni	1,500-2,500	EN	▼	It is likely that total population is between 1,500 and 2,000 individuals, but a 2007 survey indicated a maximum population of 4,000.	
Heuglin's gazelle (Eritrean gazelle)	Eudorcas tilonura	1,750-2,450	EN	▼	Total population is estimated to be, at most, 2,500-3,500 individuals.	
Nilgiri tahr	Nilgiritragus hylocrius	1800–2000	EN	▼	Values given are for total population (2008).	
Jentink's duiker	Cephalophus jentinki	2,000	EN	▼	Value given is estimate of total population, circa 2001.	
Pygmy hippopotamus	Choeropsis liberiensis	2,000-2,499	EN	▼	Global population has not been recently quantified; estimate is for total population, based on 1993 data.	
Central Asian red deer (Tarim red deer)	Cervus hanglu	2,000-2,500	LC	▲	Values given are estimate of mature individuals.	
Arabian tahr	Arabitragus jayakari	2,202-2,324	EN	▼	Total population is estimated to be 2,446 individuals.	
Cuvier's gazelle	Gazella cuvieri	2,360-4,560	VU	▼	Values given are for total population.	
Banteng	Bos javanicus	2,475-4,900	CR	▼	Values given are estimate for total population; best estimate for total population is 3,300 individuals.	
Lowland anoa	Bubalus depressicornis	< 2,500	EN	▼	Value given is estimate for mature population.	
Mountain anoa	Bubalus quarlesi	< 2,500	EN	▼	Value given is estimate for mature population.	
Wild water buffalo	Bubalus arnee	2,500	EN	▼	Total population is estimated to be less than 4,000 individuals.	
Mountain gazelle	Gazella gazella	2,500	EN	▼	Value given is for mature population. Total population was estimated to be 10,000 individuals ca. 1990s but is expected to now be much lower.	
Long-tailed goral	Naemorhedus caudatus	2,500-10,000	VU	▼	Values given are number for mature individuals.	
European bison	Bison bonasus	2,518	NT	▲	Value given is number of mature individuals in free-living, wild populations.	
Dibatag	Ammodorcas clarkei	2,800	VU	▼	Total population is estimated to be approximately 4,000 individuals.	
West Caucasian tur (Western tur)	Capra caucasica	3,000-4,000	EN	▼	Total population is estimated to be 4,000-5,000 individuals.	
Chacoan peccary	Catagonus wagneri	3,200	EN	▼	Estimate was made in 2002; wide-scale deforestation of their habitat began in 2003.	
Soemmerring's gazelle	Nanger soemmerringii	4,000-5,000	VU	▼	Total population is tentatively estimated to be <6,000-7,500 individuals.	
Barasingha	Rucervus duvaucelii	4,100-5,050	VU	▼	Values are an estimate of total population, which consists of three subspecies: R. d. duvaucelli (3,450-4,200 individuals); R. d. ranjitsinhi (350-500 individuals); R.d. branderi (300-350 individuals)	
Taruca	Hippocamelus antisensis	4,162-5,750	VU	▼	Total population is estimated to be 15,750-21,000 individuals.	
Nile lechwe	Kobus megaceros	4,291	EN	▼	Value is the result of an early dry season count from 2007. A count from the same season in 1983 estimated 12,000 total individuals.	
Nubian ibex	Capra nubiana	4,500	VU	▼	Estimate for mature individuals only due to some areas lacking population estimates.	
Arabian gazelle	Gazella arabica	5,000-7,000	VU	▼	Total population is estimated to be 12,000 individuals, ca. 2008.	
Barbary sheep (Aoudad)	Ammotragus lervia	5,000-10,000	VU	▼	Values given are estimate for mature population.	
Markhor	Capra falconeri	5,754	NT	▲	Total population is estimated to be 9,700 individuals, which includes ~900 animals assumed to live in areas without data.	
Gaur	Bos gaurus	6,000-21,000	VU	▼	Total population is estimated to be 15,000-35,000 individuals.	
Beira	Dorcatragus megalotis	7,000	VU	▼	Value given is estimate for total population, circa 1999.	
Thorold's deer (White-lipped deer)	Cervus albirostris	7,000	VU	?	Value given is most recent estimate for total population, circa 1998. Given other contemporary estimates, could be slight underestimate.	
Hairy-fronted muntjac (Black muntjac)	Muntiacus crinifrons	7,000–8,500	VU	▼	Values given are estimate of total population in 1998.	
Red goral	Naemorhedus baileyi	7,000-10,000	VU	▼	Values given are for mature individuals; best estimate is 7,000-8,000 mature individuals.	
Four-horned antelope	Tetracerus quadricornis	7,000-10,000	VU	▼	Total population is estimated to be >10,000 individuals, circa 2001.	
Wild yak	Bos mutus	7,500-9,999	VU	▼	Values given are estimate of mature population.	
Giant eland	Tragelaphus derbianus	8,400-9,800	VU	▼	Total population is estimated to be 12,150-14,200 individuals.	
Small red brocket	Mazama bororo	8,500	VU	▼	Value given is an estimate for mature population.	
Zebra duiker	Cephalophus zebra	9,500	VU	▼	Total population was estimated to be 15,000 individuals ca. 2001.	
Black wildebeest	Connochaetes gnou	9,765-11,382	LC	▲	Total wild population is estimated to be 16,260 individuals, with an additional 18,000+ individuals on ranches.	
Sulawesi babirusa	Babyrousa celebensis	9,999	VU	▼		
Javan rusa (Javan deer)	Rusa timorensis	10,000	VU	▼	Total population in native range is estimated to be 13,000-20,000. However, more than 200,000 individuals exist in populations across its introduced range.	
Okapi	Okapia johnstoni	10,000-50,000	EN	▼	Values given are best guesses for total population, combining estimates from 1999 and 2013.	
Southern pudú	Pudu puda	> 10,000	NT	▼	Value given is estimate for total population, assuming 10% of suitable habitat is occupied.	
East African oryx (Beisa oryx)	Oryx beisa	11,000-13,000	EN	▼	Estimates for total population by subspecies: O. b. beisa (12,000 total individuals); O. b. callotis (4,000-6,000 total individuals)	
American bison	Bison bison	11,248-13,123	NT	Steady	Total wild population is estimated to be 31,000 individuals (20,000 plains, 11,000 wood bison). Including captive herds would add at least 10,000 individuals.	
Red-fronted gazelle	Eudorcas rufifrons	12,000	VU	▼	Value given is for total population.	
Aders's duiker	Cephalophus adersi	14,000	VU	▼	Total population is estimated to be 20,000 individuals.	
Bongo	Tragelaphus eurycerus	15,000-25,000	NT	▼	Two subspecies: T. e. isaaci (~100 total individuals); T. e. eurycerus (28,000 total individuals).	
Mouflon	Ovis gmelini	16,000	NT	?	Total population is estimated to be 26,500 individuals.	
Urial	Ovis vignei	18,000	VU	▼	Total population is estimated to be 30,000 individuals.	
Grey rhebok	Pelea capreolus	18,000	NT	▼	Value given is an estimate for total population ca. 1999. Populations are expected to have decreased.	
Harvey's duiker	Cephalophus harveyi	20,000	LC	▼	Value given is an estimate for total population ca. 1999, though is expected to be "a substantial underestimate."	
Nyala	Tragelaphus angasii	20,000-27,500	LC	Steady	Total population is estimated to be 36,500 individuals.	
Pampas deer	Ozotoceros bezoarticus	20,000-80,000	NT	▼	Values given are an estimate of minimum-maximum total population size, ca. 1994.	
East Caucasian tur (Eastern tur)	Capra cylindricornis	23,000	NT	Steady	Total population is estimated to be 31,000–32,000 individuals.	
Silver dik-dik	Madoqua piacentinii	30,000	DD	▼	Value given is an estimate for total population ca. 1999.	
Blackbuck	Antilope cervicapra	35,000	LC	?	Total population was estimated to be 50,000 individuals ca. 2000. Sizeable introduced populations exist in Argentina and USA.	
Ogilby's duiker	Cephalophus ogilbyi	35,000	LC	▼	Value given is an estimate for total population ca. 1999. IUCN considers this species to have two subspecies: Brooke's (C. o. brookei; 5,000 individuals); White-legged (C. o. crusalbum; 18,000 individuals)	
Dorcas gazelle	Gazella dorcas	35,000-99,999	VU	▼	Values given are a very rough estimate for total population, ca. 1999.	
Mountain reedbuck	Redunca fulvorufula	36,000	EN	▼	Value given is an estimate for total population ca. 1999.	
Red forest duiker (Natal red duiker)	Cephalophus natalensis	42,000	LC	▼	Value given is an estimate for total population ca. 1999; may be an underestimate.	
Klipspringer	Oreotragus oreotragus	42,000	LC	Steady	Value given is an estimate for total population ca. 1999; may be an underestimate.	
Goitered gazelle	Gazella subgutturosa	42,000-49,000	VU	▼	Values given are estimate for number of mature individuals. Total population was estimated to be 120,000-140,000 individuals ca. 2001, but is expected to be lower now due to rapid declines.	
Bharal (Blue sheep)	Pseudois nayaur	47,000-414,000	LC	?	Values given range from a "very conservative estimate" to "probably an overestimate."	
Mountain goat	Oreamnos americanus	48,000-62,000	LC	Steady	Total population is estimated to be 80,700-117,200 individuals.	
Bighorn sheep	Ovis canadensis	49,000	LC	Steady	Total population is estimated to be 82,655-84,000 individuals.	
Iberian ibex (Iberian wild goat)	Capra pyrenaica	50,000	LC	▲	Total population is estimated to be 100,000 individuals.	
Pyrenean chamois (Southern chamois)	Rupicapra pyrenaica	50,000	LC	▲	Value given is for number of mature individuals.	
Roan antelope	Hippotragus equinus	50,000-60,000	LC	▼	Total population was estimated to be 76,000 individuals ca. 1999.	
Sable antelope	Hippotragus niger	50,000-60,000	LC	Steady	Total population was estimated to be 75,000 individuals ca. 1999.	
Chinkara (Indian gazelle)	Gazella bennettii	50,000-70,000	LC	▼	Total population is estimated to be approximately 100,000 individuals.	
Alpine ibex	Capra ibex	53,000	LC	Steady	Value given is for total population.	
Bontebok	Damaliscus pygargus	55,000	LC	▲	Total population is estimated to be at least 78,503-79,369 individuals between two subspecies: D. p. phillipsi (>77,751); D. p. pygargus (752 - 1,618)	
Dall sheep (Thinhorn sheep)	Ovis dalli	57,600–75,600	LC	Steady	Total population is estimated to be 96,000 – 126,000 individuals.	
Royal antelope	Neotragus pygmaeus	62,000	LC	▼	Value given is an estimate for total population ca. 1999; may be an underestimate.	
Giraffe (Northern giraffe)	Giraffa camelopardalis	68,293	VU	▼	Total population is estimated to be 97,562 individuals. Note that some taxonomists recognize as many as eight different species of giraffe (see Giraffidae), though current IUCN assessment considers all populations to be within G. camelopardalis. However, as of 2025, the IUCN recognizes 3 additional species currently contained within the populations cited here.	
Wild goat	Capra aegagrus	70,000	NT	Steady	Total population is estimated to be 110,000 individuals, not including populations in Pakistan and Afghanistan.	
Nilgai	Boselaphus tragocamelus	70,000-100,000	LC	Steady	Values given are for number of mature individuals. A feral introduced population, numbering approximately 67,000 individuals, is established in Texas.	
Southern reedbuck	Redunca arundinum	73,000	LC	Steady	Value given is an estimate for total population ca. 1999.	
Lesser kudu	Tragelaphus imberbis	80,000-100,000	NT	▼	Total population is estimated to be 118,000 individuals.	
Snow sheep	Ovis nivicola	85,000-95,000	LC	?	Values given are for total population (mid 1980s).	
Common eland	Tragelaphus oryx	90,000-110,000	LC	Steady	Total population was estimated to be 136,000 individuals ca. 1999.	
Sitatunga	Tragelaphus spekii	90,000-120,000	LC	▼	Total population was estimated to be 170,000 individuals ca. 1999, but this was likely an overestimate.	
Gerenuk	Litocranius walleri	95,000	NT	▼	Value given is an estimate for total population ca. 1999.	
Sharpe's grysbok	Raphicerus sharpei	95,000	LC	Steady	Value given is an estimate for total population ca. 1999; may be an underestimate.	
Japanese serow	Capricornis crispus	100,000	LC	Steady	Value given is an estimate for total population ca. 1984; may be an underestimate.	
Black duiker	Cephalophus niger	100,000	LC	▼	Value given is for total population ca. 1999.	
Tibetan gazelle (Goa)	Procapra picticaudata	100,000	NT	▼	Value given is for total population ca. 1998.	
Tibetan antelope (Chiru)	Pantholops hodgsonii	100,000-150,000	NT	▲	Values given are lower and upper estimates of total population.	
Bohor reedbuck	Redunca redunca	101,000	LC	▼	Value given is for total population ca. 1999; likely an underestimate.	
Siberian ibex	Capra sibirica	102,000-150,000	NT	▼	Total population is estimated to be 170,000-250,000 individuals.	
Argali	Ovis ammon	107,000	NT	▼	Value given is for total population; could be a large overestimate.	
Hippopotamus (Common hippopotamus)	Hippopotamus amphibius	115,000-130,000	VU	Steady	Values given are for total population.	
Muskox	Ovibos moschatus	127,102	LC	▼	Value given is for total population.	
Puku	Kobus vardonii	130,000	NT	▼	Value is for total population ca. 1999.	
Grant's gazelle	Nanger granti	140,000	LC	▼	Value given is for total population, but may be an underestimate.	
Thomson's gazelle	Eudorcas thomsonii	145,000	LC	▼	Total population is estimated to be 207,361 individuals.	
Lechwe (Southern lechwe)	Kobus leche	158,750	NT	Steady	Value is for total population. Four subspecies: K. l. leche (80,000); K. l. kafuensis (78,000); K. l. smithemani (49,036); K. l. anselli (<1000)	
Yellow-backed duiker	Cephalophus silvicultor	160,000	NT	▼	Value is for total population ca. 1999.	
Red-flanked duiker	Cephalophus rufilatus	170,000	LC	▼	Value is for total population ca. 1999.	
Weyns's duiker	Cephalophus weynsi	188,000	LC	▼	Value is for total population ca. 1999.	
Waterbuck	Kobus ellipsiprymnus	200,000	LC	▼	Value is for total population ca. 1999. Two subspecies: K. e. ellipsiprymnus (105,000); K. e. defassa (95,000).	
Bates's pygmy antelope	Neotragus batesi	219,000	LC	?	Value is for total population ca. 1999.	
Water chevrotain	Hyemoschus aquaticus	278,000	LC	▼	Value is for total population ca. 1999.	
Mongalla gazelle	Eudorcas albonotata	>278,000	LC	Steady	Value given is total population from an aerial survey in 2007, which may not have captured entire range.	
White-bellied duiker	Cephalophus leucogaster	287,000	NT	▼	Value is for total population ca. 1999.	
Black-fronted duiker	Cephalophus nigrifrons	300,000	LC	▼	Value is for total population ca. 1999.	
Chamois (Northern chamois)	Rupicapra rupicapra	300,000	LC	Steady		
Greater kudu	Tragelaphus strepsiceros	300,000-350,000	LC	Steady	Total population was estimated to be 482,000 individuals ca. 1999.	
Tufted deer	Elaphodus cephalophus	300,000-500,000	NT	▼	Value given is a best guess for total population, ca. 1998.	
Vicuña	Lama vicugna	350,000	LC	▲	Total population is estimated to be 473,297 – 527,691 individuals.	
Hartebeest	Alcelaphus buselaphus	362,000	LC	▼	Value is for total population ca. 1999. Likely now an overestimate given steep declines of A. b. lelwel.	
Suni	Nesotragus moschatus	365,000	LC	Steady	Value is for total population ca. 1999.	
Gemsbok	Oryx gazella	373,000	LC	Steady	Value given is for total population.	
Peters's duiker	Cephalophus callipygus	382,000	LC	▼	Value is for total population ca. 1999.	
African buffalo	Syncerus caffer	398,000-401,000	NT	▼	Total population is estimated to be 569,000-573,000 individuals.	
Topi (Tsessebe, Tiang)	Damaliscus lunatus	> 405,000	LC	▼	Value given is a rough estimate for total population, given a) 1999 estimate of 300,000 total individuals and b) a known underestimate of D. l. lunatus for this estimate by at least 105,000 individuals.	
Salt's dik-dik	Madoqua saltiana	485,600	LC	Steady	Value is for total population ca. 1999.	
Kob	Kobus kob	500,000-1,000,000	LC	▼	Estimates for total population are broken down by subspecies: K. k. kob - 95,000 (1999); K. k. thomasi - 100,000 (1999); K. k. leucotis - > 753,572 (2007)	
Mongolian gazelle	Procapra gutturosa	500,000-1,500,000	LC	Steady	Values given are for total population; could be an overestimate, with population as low as 400,000 individuals.	
Günther's dik-dik	Madoqua guentheri	511,000	LC	Steady	Value is for total population ca. 1999.	
Steenbok	Raphicerus campestris	> 600,000	LC	Steady	Value given is for total population, ca. 1999; considered to be an underestimate.	
Bay duiker	Cephalophus dorsalis	725,000	NT	▼	Value is for total population ca. 1999.	
Pronghorn	Antilocapra americana	750,000	LC	Steady	Total population is estimated to be approximately 1 million individuals.	
Oribi	Ourebia ourebi	750,000	LC	▼	Value is for total population ca. 1999.	
Saiga antelope	Saiga tatarica	922,600-988,500	NT	▲	Total population is estimated to be 1,344,275 individuals, most of whom are in Kazakhstan population.	
Kirk's dik-dik	Madoqua kirkii	971,000	LC	Steady	Value is for total population ca. 1999.	
Siberian roe deer	Capreolus pygargus	1,000,000	LC	▼	Value is for total population ca. 1999. Likely now an overestimate.	
Bushbuck (Harnessed bushbuck)	Tragelaphus scriptus	1,000,000-1,500,000	LC	Steady	Values given are estimate for number of mature individuals. Some taxonomists split this species into harnessed bushbuck (T. scriptus) and cape bushbuck (T. sylvaticus). IUCN maintains both within T. scriptus.	
Springbok	Antidorcas marsupialis	1,400,000-1,750,000	LC	▲	Total population is estimated to be 2,000,000-2,500,000 individuals.	
Moose	Alces alces	1,440,000	LC	▲	Value given is for total population, with an estimated 440,000 individuals in Europe, and 1 million in North America.	
Guanaco	Lama guanicoe	1,498,170-2,192,300	LC	▲	Values given are for total population.	
Blue wildebeest (Common wildebeest)	Connochaetes taurinus	1,550,000	LC	Steady	Value given is for total population.	
Impala	Aepyceros melampus	2,000,000	LC	Steady	Value is for total population ca. 1999.	
Maxwell's duiker	Philantomba maxwellii	2,137,000	LC	▼	Value is for total population ca. 1999; may be an underestimate.	
Red deer	Cervus elaphus	2,400,000	LC	▲	Value is for European population ca. 2005; while this represents majority of its range, almost certainly an underestimate for global population.	
Reindeer (Caribou)	Rangifer tarandus	2,890,400	VU	▼	Value given is for total population.	
Blue duiker	Philantomba monticola	7,000,000	LC	▼	Value is for total population ca. 1999; may be an underestimate.	
Common duiker	Sylvicapra grimmia	10,000,000	LC	▼	Value given is most recent estimate for total population, ca. 2013. Previous 1999 estimate was for 1.66 million individuals.	
White-tailed deer	Odocoileus virginianus	11,500,000	LC	Steady	Estimated population in the United States and Canada only, with estimate of 11 million in the U.S. considered a minimum.	
Roe deer (European roe deer)	Capreolus capreolus	15,000,000	LC	▲	Value given is for total population in central Europe. Populations in Italy and Turkey are estimated to be 10,000 and 6,000-8,000 individuals, respectively.	

== Domestic species by population ==
Common name	Binomial name	Population	Status	Trend	Notes	Image
Bactrian camel	Camelus bactrianus	952,000	Domestic		Value given is estimate from 2016. The 2024 population estimate from the FAO for domestic camels (species not delineated) is 44,336,084 individuals.	
Llama	Lama glama	3,000,000	Domestic		Domestic form of the guanaco (L. guanicoe). The 2024 official figure from the FAO for number of domestic 'other camelids' (i.e., llamas and alpacas) is 8,621,586 individuals.	
Alpaca	Lama pacos	3,000,000	Domestic		Domestic form of the vicuña (V. vicugna). The 2024 official figure from the FAO for number of domestic 'other camelids' (i.e., llamas and alpacas) is 8,621,586 individuals.	
Dromedary camel	Camelus dromedarius	30,000,000	Domestic		Value given is estimate from 2019. The 2024 population estimate from the FAO for domestic camels (species not delineated) is 44,336,084 individuals.	
Water buffalo	Bubalus bubalis	212,008,800	Domestic		Domestic form of the wild water buffalo (B. arnee). Value given is the 2024 estimate for number of domestic buffalo worldwide, per the FAO.	
Domestic pig	Sus domesticus	962,441,623	Domestic		Domestic form of the wild boar (S scrofa). Value given is the 2024 official figure for number of domestic swine/pigs worldwide, per the FAO.	
Domestic goat	Capra hircus	1,187,524,236	Domestic		Domestic form of the bezoar ibex (wild goat; C. aegagrus). Value given is the 2024 estimate for number of domestic goats worldwide, per the FAO.	
Domestic sheep	Ovis aries	1,362,590,940	Domestic		Domestic form of the mouflon (O. gmelini). Value given is the 2024 estimate for number of domestic sheep worldwide, per the FAO.	
Cattle	Bos taurus	1,578,614,149	Domestic		Domestic form of the extinct aurochs (B. primigenius). Value given is the 2024 estimate for number of domestic cattle worldwide, per the FAO.	

== Species without population estimates ==
Common name	Binomial name	Population	Status	Trend	Notes	Image
Red brocket	Mazama americana	unknown	DD	?		
Central American red brocket	Mazama temama	unknown	DD	▼	No estimates of species population or density over most of its range.	
Fea's muntjac	Muntiacus feae	unknown	DD	?		
Gongshan muntjac	Muntiacus gongshanensis	unknown	DD	▼	Population is expected to be relatively large, but geographic range occupancy is largely unknown.	
Sumatran muntjac (Sumatran mountain muntjac)	Muntiacus montanus	unknown	DD	?		
Puhoat muntjac	Muntiacus puhoatensis	unknown	DD	?	Species is known from one specimen.	
Leaf muntjac	Muntiacus putaoensis	unknown	DD	▼		
Roosevelt's muntjac	Muntiacus rooseveltorum	unknown	DD	▼		
Truong Son muntjac (Annamite muntjac)	Muntiacus truongsonensis	unknown	DD	▼		
Walter's duiker	Philantomba walteri	unknown	DD	?	Species is only known from 41 specimens. Nothing is known about live populations.	
Northern pudu	Pudella mephistophiles	unknown	DD	▼	IUCN places this species in genus Pudu. Some taxonomists split an additional species, the Peruvian Yungas pudu (P. carlae) from this species.	
Javan chevrotain (Java mouse-deer)	Tragulus javanicus	unknown	DD	?		
Vietnam mouse-deer (Silver-backed chevrotain)	Tragulus versicolor	unknown	DD	▼		
Williamson's mouse-deer (Williamson's chevrotain)	Tragulus williamsoni	unknown	DD	▼		
Giant muntjac (Large-antlered muntjac)	Muntiacus vuquangensis	unknown	CR	▼		
Visayan warty pig	Sus cebifrons	unknown	CR	▼	Extirpated from, or functionally extinct on 4 of 6 islands it once inhabited. Hybridization with feral pigs threatens the last two populations on Negros and Panay.	
Indian hog deer (Hog deer)	Axis porcinus	unknown	EN	▼		
Speke's gazelle	Gazella spekei	unknown	EN	▼	Extinct in its former Ethiopian range, and Somalian population is declining rapidly due to hunting pressures.	
Dwarf musk deer (Forest musk deer)	Moschus berezovskii	unknown	EN	▼	Total population was estimated to be 100,000-200,000 in 1992, but this estimate was a rough guess at the time and is highly uncertain.	
Alpine musk deer	Moschus chrysogaster	unknown	EN	▼	Several rough estimates exist at the regional level within China and Nepal, but abundance across the species' range is largely unknown.	
Kashmir musk deer	Moschus cupreus	unknown	EN	▼		
Black musk deer	Moschus fuscus	unknown	EN	▼		
Himalayan musk deer (White-bellied musk deer)	Moschus leucogaster	unknown	EN	▼		
Javan warty pig	Sus verrucosus	unknown	EN	▼		
Philippine mouse-deer (Balabac mouse deer)	Tragulus nigricans	unknown	EN	▼		
Buru babirusa (Hairy babirusa)	Babyrousa babyrussa	unknown	VU	▼		
Marsh deer	Blastocerus dichotomus	unknown	VU	▼	Population across entire range is unknown, but 43,000 individuals are estimated to reside in Brazil.	
Takin	Budorcas taxicolor	unknown	VU	▼	Populations of some subspecies were estimated in the last century, but no population estimate exists for entire species: B. t. bedfordi - 5,069 (ca. 2001); B. t. taxicolor - 3,500 (ca. 1998); B. t. tibetana - 370-410 (ca. 1989); B. t. whitei - unknown	
Red serow (Burmese red serow)	Capricornis rubidus	unknown	VU	▼		
Mainland serow	Capricornis sumatraensis	unknown	VU	▼	IUCN lists three subspecies of this one; some studies indicate they may be standalone species: Sumatran serow (C. s. sumatraensis); Chinese serow (C. s. milneedwardsii); Himalayan serow (C. s. thar)	
Water deer	Hydropotes inermis	unknown	VU	▼		
Mérida brocket	Mazama bricenii	unknown	VU	▼		
Dwarf brocket (Peruvian dwarf brocket)	Mazama chunyi	unknown	VU	▼		
Pygmy brocket (Brazilian dwarf brocket)	Mazama nana	unknown	VU	?		
Little red brocket (Dwarf red brocket)	Mazama rufina	unknown	VU	▼		
Yucatan brown brocket	Odocoileus pandora	unknown	VU	▼	IUCN places this species in genus Mazama.	
Siberian musk deer	Moschus moschiferus	unknown	VU	▼	Total population in Siberia is estimated to be 110,000 individuals (2011), and 44,000 individuals in Mongolia (1986). No abundance data is available for the species' range in China or Korea.	
Chinese goral	Naemorhedus griseus	unknown	VU	▼		
Philippine deer	Rusa marianna	unknown	VU	▼		
Sambar	Rusa unicolor	unknown	VU	▼		
Bornean bearded pig (Bearded pig)	Sus barbatus	unknown	VU	▼		
Oliver's warty pig	Sus oliveri	unknown	VU	▼		
Philippine warty pig	Sus philippensis	unknown	VU	▼		
White-lipped peccary	Tayassu pecari	unknown	VU	▼	Total population in the Peruvian Amazon is estimated to be 477,000 individuals, though this makes up only a small portion of the species' total range.	
Himalayan tahr	Hemitragus jemlahicus	unknown	NT	▼		
Bornean yellow muntjac	Muntiacus atherodes	unknown	NT	▼		
Himalayan goral	Naemorhedus goral	unknown	NT	▼		
Palawan bearded pig	Sus ahoenobarbus	unknown	NT	▼		
Chital	Axis axis	unknown	LC	?		
Taiwan serow (Formosan serow)	Capricornis swinhoei	unknown	LC	?		
Elk (Wapiti)	Cervus canadensis	unknown	LC	▲	Population is known to be quite large, and national estimates exist for several countries; however, population is unknown across total range.	
Sika deer	Cervus nippon	unknown	LC	▲	Population is estimated to be 8,500-9,000 individuals in Russia, and less than 1,000 in China. No population estimate is given for the population in Japan, which is expected to hold the large majority of the species' global population.	
Common fallow deer (European fallow deer)	Dama dama	unknown	LC	?	Species is considered introduced across most of its current range. Original, native population is estimated to be less than 30 individuals.	
Giant forest hog (Forest hog)	Hylochoerus meinertzhageni	unknown	LC	▼		
Amazonian brown brocket	Mazama nemorivaga	unknown	LC	▼		
Indian spotted chevrotain (Indian chevrotain)	Moschiola indica	unknown	LC	?		
Yellow-striped chevrotain	Moschiola kathygre	unknown	LC	?		
Sri Lankan spotted chevrotain (White-spotted chevrotain)	Moschiola meminna	unknown	LC	?		
Southern red muntjac	Muntiacus muntjak	unknown	LC	▼		
Reeves's muntjac	Muntiacus reevesi	unknown	LC	▼	Chinese population was roughly estimated to be 2 million individuals in the 1980s. Population in Taiwan is not quantified.	
Northern red muntjac	Muntiacus vaginalis	unknown	LC	▼		
Mule deer	Odocoileus hemionus	unknown	LC	Steady		
Collared peccary	Pecari tajacu	unknown	LC	Steady		
Desert warthog	Phacochoerus aethiopicus	unknown	LC	▼		
Common warthog	Phacochoerus africanus	unknown	LC	▼	Total population in South Africa is estimated to be at least 22,250 individuals, but population is not known across the rest of its range.	
Bushpig	Potamochoerus larvatus	unknown	LC	Steady		
Red river hog	Potamochoerus porcus	unknown	LC	▼		
Cape grysbok	Raphicerus melanotis	unknown	LC	Steady	Population could be up to 231,448 individuals in the Cape Floristic Region, and is estimated to be between 1,704 and 129,544 individuals in the Western Cape province. However, no estimates exist over the rest of its range.	
Gray brocket	Subulo gouazoubira	unknown	LC	▼	IUCN places this species in genus Mazama.	
Wild boar	Sus scrofa	unknown	LC	?		
Lesser mouse-deer (Lesser oriental chevrotain)	Tragulus kanchil	unknown	LC	?		
Greater mouse-deer (Greater oriental chevrotain)	Tragulus napu	unknown	LC	▼		

== See also ==
- Lists of mammals by population
- Lists of organisms by population
