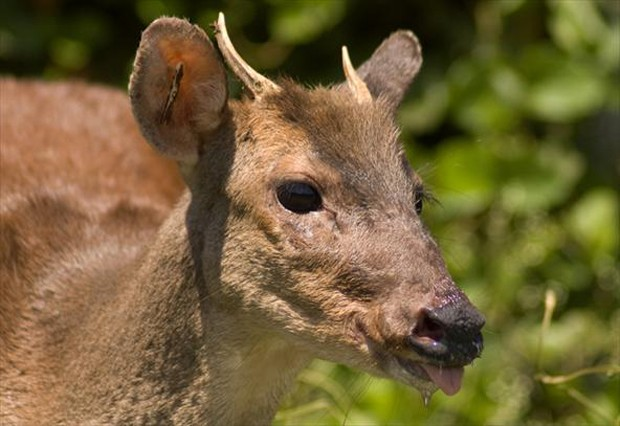

Conservation status
- Vulnerable (IUCN 3.1)

Scientific classification
- Kingdom: Animalia
- Phylum: Chordata
- Class: Mammalia
- Order: Artiodactyla
- Family: Cervidae
- Subfamily: Capreolinae
- Genus: Mazama
- Species: M. bororo

Binomial name
- Mazama bororo Duarte, 1996
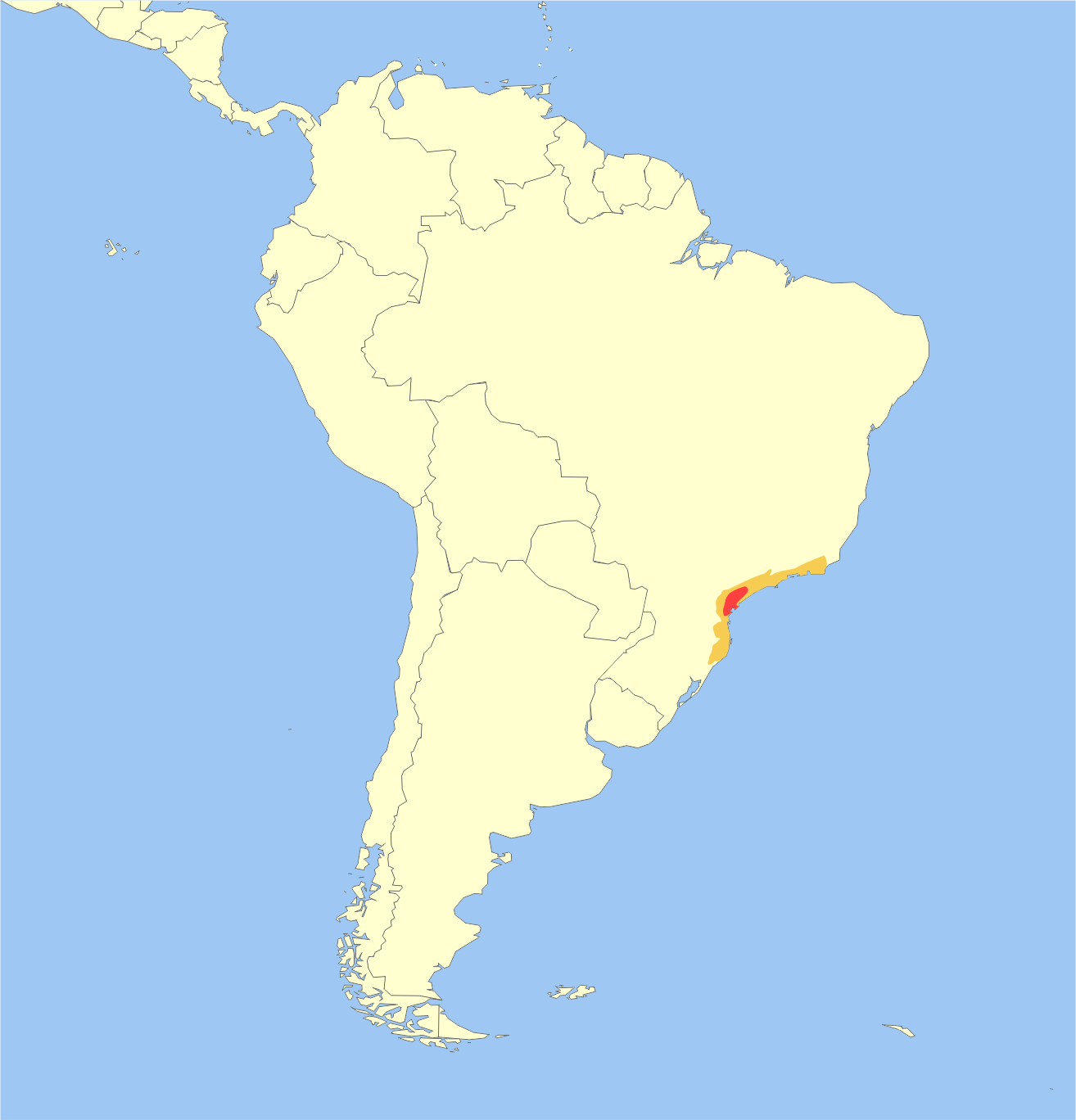
- Small red brocket range. Extant Probably extant

= Small red brocket =

Species of deer

The small red brocket (Mazama bororo) is a small species of brocket deer in the family Cervidae. It is endemic to Atlantic Forest in Paraná, Santa Catarina and São Paulo in southeastern Brazil. This species, which only was scientifically described in 1996, is threatened by habitat loss. Though its size and structure most resemble that of the pygmy brocket (M. nana), its coloration is very similar to that of the red brocket (M. americana). It resembles hybrids between these two species even more closely, but differs from both, and their hybrids, in karyotype.
