= Largest cervids =

World's largest deer

Cervids are one of the most common families of wild herbivores in the world. Of these the moose can grow up to 2.33 m tall and weigh as much as 820 kg. The smallest cervid is the northern pudu.

| Rank | Cervid | Binomial name | Known maximum mass [kg (lbs)] | Shoulder Height [m] | Image |
|---|---|---|---|---|---|
| 1 | Moose | Alces alces | 820 (1808) | 2.33 | |
| 2 | Elk | Cervus canadensis | 600 (1323) | 1.6 | |
| 3 | Sambar | Rusa unicolor | 546 (1204) | 1.6 | |
| 4 | Red deer | Cervus elaphus | 500 (1102) | 1.4 | |
| 5 | Reindeer | Rangifer tarandus | 318 (701) | 1.5 | |
| 6 | Barasingha | Rucervus duvaucelii | 280 (617) | 1.3 | |
| 7 | White-tailed deer | Odocoileus virginianus | 232 (512) | 1.2 | |
| 8 | Thorold's deer | Cervus albirostris | 230 (507) | 1.4 | |
| 9 | Mule deer | Odocoileus hemionus | 210 (463) | 1.2 | |
| 10 | Père David's deer | Elaphurus davidianus | 200 (441) | 1.2 | |
| 11 | Marsh deer | Blastocerus dichotomus | 150 (330) | 1.2 | |

== See also ==
- List of cervids
