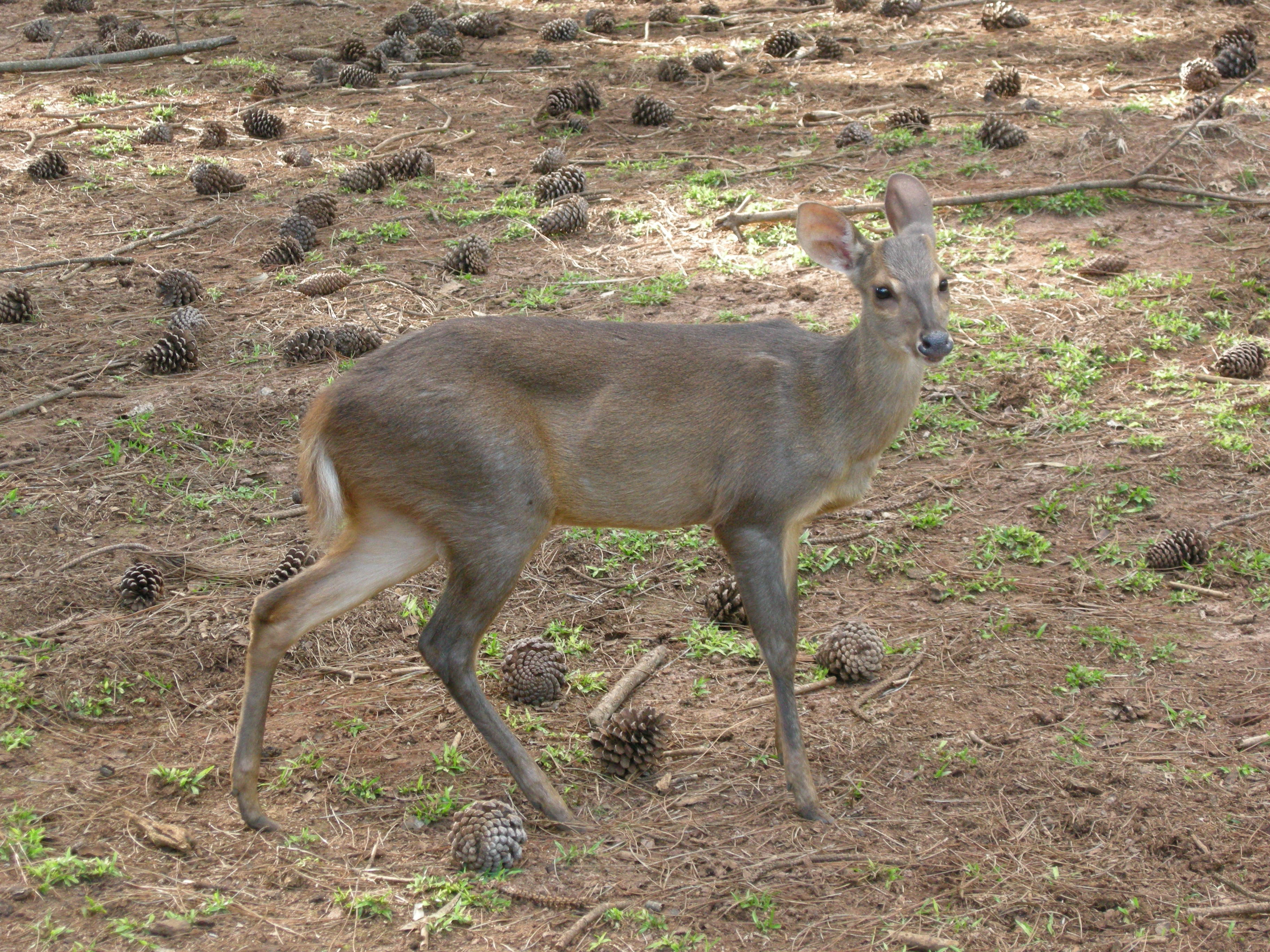
- Gray brocket (M. gouazoubira)

Scientific classification
- Kingdom: Animalia
- Phylum: Chordata
- Class: Mammalia
- Order: Artiodactyla
- Family: Cervidae
- Subfamily: Capreolinae
- Tribe: Odocoileini
- Genus: Mazama; Rafinesque, 1817

Type species
- Moschus americanus Erxleben, 1777

Species
- M. americana M. bororo M. bricenii M. chunyi M. nana M. nemorivaga M. rufina M. temama M. tienhoveni

= Brocket deer =

Genus of deer

Brockets or brocket deer are the species of deer in the genus Mazama. They are medium to small in size, and are found in the Yucatán Peninsula, Central and South America, and the island of Trinidad. Most species are primarily found in forests. They are superficially similar to the African duikers and the Asian muntjacs, but only distantly related. About 10 species of brocket deer are described.

The genus name Mazama is derived from Nahuatl mazame, the plural of mazatl "deer". The common English name "brocket" (from French brocart < broche, spindle) comes from the word for a stag in its second year, with unbranched antlers.

== Taxonomy ==
The taxonomy among Mazama species has changed significantly in the last decades, and as recently as 1999, some authorities only recognized four species. These four "species", M. americana, M. gouazoubira, M. rufina, and M. chunnyi, included several distinct populations that subsequently were elevated to species status, resulting in a total of nine different species being recognized in Mammal Species of the World in 2005. A tenth species, M. nemorivaga, has traditionally been included in M. gouazoubira, but this was shown to be mistaken in 2000. M. nemorivaga was not recognized as a separate species in Mammal Species of the World, but this was apparently in error. Yet another species, the fair brocket (M. tienhoveni), has recently been described from the lower Amazon basin. What may be an undescribed small species of brocket with a reddish coat and blackish legs has been photographed in the lowlands of Manú National Park in Peru, and based on sight records may also occur in northwestern Bolivia.

Molecular dating suggests that the family Cervidae originated and radiated in central Asia during the Late Miocene, and that the Odocoileini dispersed to North America during the Miocene/Pliocene boundary and underwent an adaptive radiation in South America after their Pliocene dispersal across the Isthmus of Panama. The oldest fossil of Mazama has been recovered from the Early/Middle Pleistocene Río Tomayate locality of El Salvador. According to the systematic relationships and evolutionary history of neotropical deer, at least eight ancestral forms of deer invaded South America during the late Pliocene (2.5–3 Mya), and members of the red brockets had an independent early explosive diversification soon after their ancestor arrived there, giving rise to a number of morphologically cryptic species.

Deer endemic to the New World fall in two biogeographic lineages: the first, which includes genus Odocoileus and Mazama americana, is distributed in North, Central, and South America, whereas the second is composed of South American species only and includes Mazama gouazoubira. This implies that the genus Mazama is not a monophyletic taxon. Genetic analysis reveals high levels of molecular and cytogenetic divergence between groups of morphologically similar species of brockets (Mazama) and suggests a polyphyletic origin. In particular, M. americana showed a striking kinship with Odocoileus on the basis of several DNA sequences, in contrast to that expected, since this M. americana (now M. temama) haplotype, of Mexican origin, was not close to several Bolivian Mazama sequences analyzed. Thus, Mazama as traditionally circumscribed may not be monophyletic. These Bolivian Mazama species were instead grouped with Pudu puda and Ozotoceros bezoarticus. This could be explained by various possibilities, among them the existence of common ancestral haplotypes among the species or the need for a revised phylogenetic tree, with revised placement into true monophyletic genera that better reflect the true ancestry.

Genus Mazama – nine species
Common name	Scientific name and subspecies	Range	Size and ecology	IUCN status and estimated population
Red brocket	Mazama americana (Erxleben, 1777)	Argentina to Colombia and the Guianas.	Size: Habitat: Diet:	DD
Small red brocket or bororo	Mazama bororo Duarte, 1996	Brazil ( Atlantic Forest in Paraná, Santa Catarina and São Paulo )	Size: Habitat: Diet:	VU
Merida brocket	Mazama bricenii (Thomas, 1908)	northern Colombia and western Venezuela	Size: Habitat: Diet:	VU
Dwarf brocket	Mazama chunyi Hershkovitz, 1959	western Bolivia and southeastern Peru	Size: Habitat: Diet:	VU
Pygmy brocket	Mazama nana (Hensel, 1872)	Brazil, Argentina and Paraguay	Size: Habitat: Diet:	VU
Amazonian brown brocket	Mazama nemorivaga (F. Cuvier, 1817) Two subspecies: M. n. nemorivaga; M. n. permira	Colombia, Venezuela, Guyana, Suriname, French Guiana, eastern Ecuador, eastern Peru, Brazil	Size: Habitat: Diet:	LC
Central American red brocket	Mazama temama (, ) Three subspecies: M. temama temama; M. temama cerasina; M. temama reperticia	southern Mexico, through Central America, to northwestern Colombia	Size: Habitat: Diet:	DD
Fair brocket	Mazama tienhoveni (Roosmalen, 2015)	Brazil	Size: Habitat: Diet:	

The Yucatan brown brocket (O. pandora) has been previously treated as a disjunct subspecies of the gray brocket or a subspecies of the red brocket (Mazama americana). In 2021, the American Society of Mammalogists placed it in the genus Odocoileus. While research suggests that both the dwarf brocket and gray brocket should be allocated to the genus Subulo, only the gray brocket has been accepted into the genus by the American Society of Mammalogists.

== Physical description and habitat ==
Depending on species, brocket deer are small to medium-sized with stout bodies and large ears. The head-and-body length is 60–144 cm (24–57 in), the shoulder height is 35–80 cm (14–31 in), and the typical weight 8–48 kg (18–106 lb), though exceptionally large M. americana specimens have weighed as much as 65 kg (143 lb). When present, the antlers are small, simple spikes. The pelage varies from reddish to brown to gray. Very roughly, the species can be divided into four groups based on size, color, and habitat (but not necessarily matching their phylogeny):

- M. americana and M. temama are usually found in forest. They are relatively large to medium brocket deer with a reddish to reddish-brown pelage. The head, neck, and legs are often grayish or blackish.
- M. gouazoubira, M. nemorivaga, and M. pandora are found in forest, woodland, and shrubland. They are medium-sized with a brownish to grayish pelage and pale underparts.
- M. nana, M. bricenii, M. chunyi, and M. rufina are found in forest and high-altitude grassland (M. nana in Atlantic forest; the remaining species in Andean cloud forest, elfin forest and páramo). They are medium to small in size, and the pelage is reddish. In most, a part of the legs and the upper part of the head are blackish or dark gray, but in M. chunyi, the foreparts and neck are also blackish or dark gray.
- M. bororo is found in Atlantic forest in southeastern Brazil. In appearance, it is intermediate in appearance between M. americana (first group) and M. nana (third group).

== Behavior ==
In addition to being small and nocturnal, Mazama species are shy and are thus rarely observed. They are found living alone or in mated pairs within their own small territory, the boundaries usually marked with urine, feces, or secretions from the eye glands. When threatened by predators (primarily the cougar and the jaguar), they use their knowledge of their territory to finding hiding places in nearby vegetation. As herbivores, their diet consists of leaves, fruits, and shoots.

== Reproduction ==
Mated pairs that live together remain monogamous. Single male deer usually mate with nearby females. When males compete for a mate, they fight by biting and stabbing with their short antlers. Brocket species that live in tropical areas have no fixed mating season, but those in temperate areas have a distinct rutting period in the autumn.

The gestation period is roughly 200–220 days and females bear only one fawn at a time. The young stay with the mother, keeping concealed until large enough to accompany her. They are normally weaned around six months of age and reach sexual maturity after a year.
