= Truong Son muntjac =

Conservation status
- Data Deficient (IUCN 3.1)

Scientific classification
- Kingdom: Animalia
- Phylum: Chordata
- Class: Mammalia
- Order: Artiodactyla
- Family: Cervidae
- Genus: Muntiacus
- Species: M. truongsonensis

Binomial name
- Muntiacus truongsonensis (Giao, Tuoc, Dung, Wikramanayake, Amato, Arctander & Mackinnon, 1997)
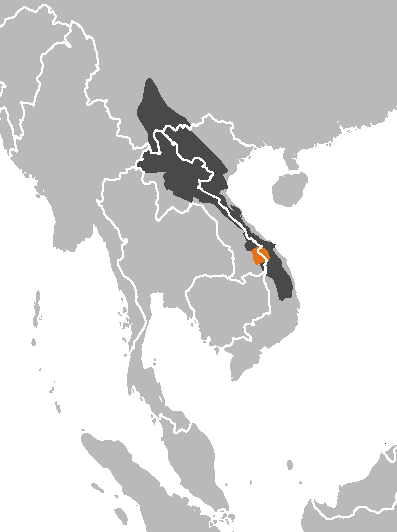

Species of deer

The Truong Son muntjac or Annamite muntjac (Muntiacus truongsonensis) is a species of muntjac deer. It is one of the smallest muntjac species, at about 15 kg (33 lb), half the size of the Indian muntjac (or common muntjac). It was discovered in the Truong Son (Annamite) mountain range in Vietnam in 1997.

It was identified by examination of skulls and descriptions provided by villagers, who call it samsoi cacoong, or "the deer that lives in the deep, thick forest." It lives at elevations of 400–1000 metres, where its small size allows it to move through dense undergrowth.
