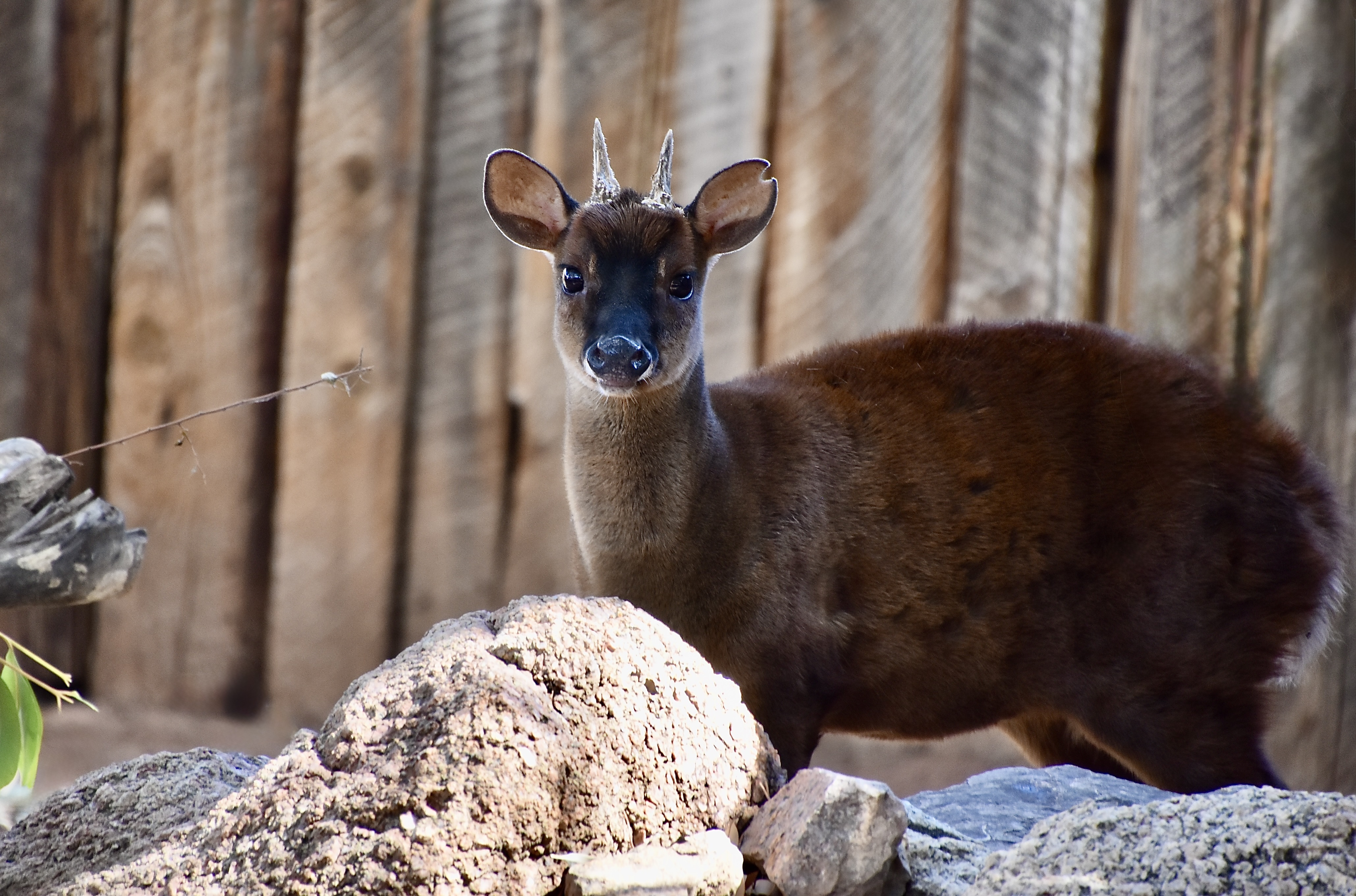
- Male at Phoenix Zoo.

Conservation status
- Data Deficient (IUCN 3.1)

Scientific classification
- Kingdom: Animalia
- Phylum: Chordata
- Class: Mammalia
- Order: Artiodactyla
- Family: Cervidae
- Subfamily: Capreolinae
- Genus: Mazama
- Species: M. temama

Binomial name
- Mazama temama (Kerr, 1792)

Subspecies
- M. temama temama (nominate); M. temama cerasina M. temama reperticia
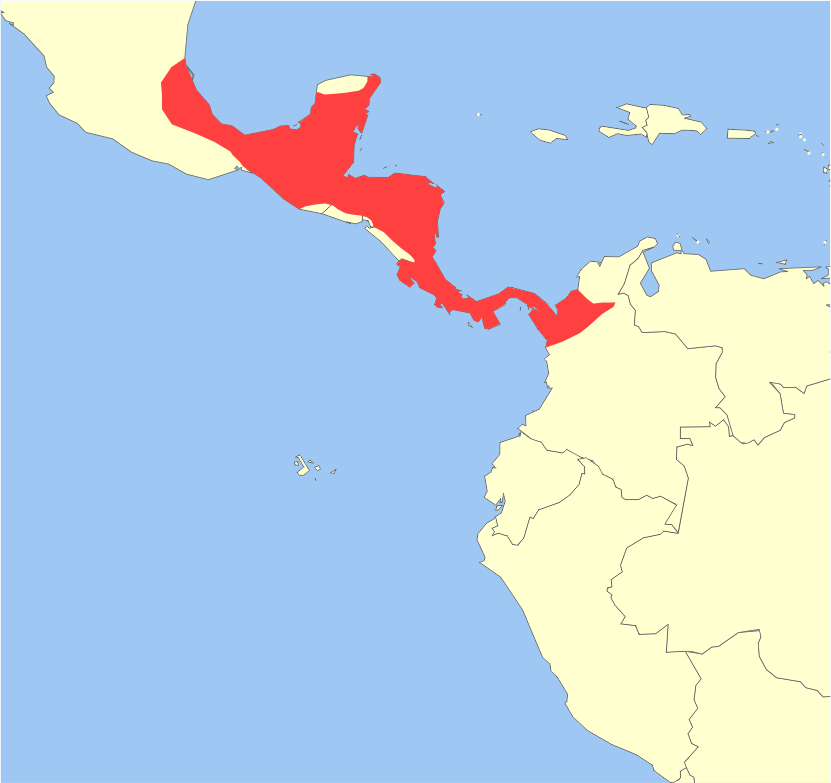

= Central American red brocket =

Species of deer

The Central American or Mexican red brocket (Mazama temama), as it is sometimes called, is a species of brocket deer native to Mexico, Central America, and northern Colombia.

== Taxonomy ==
In 1792 Robert Kerr originally described it as a separate species as opposed to a subspecies. It was subsequently treated as a subspecies of the red brocket (Mazama americana) from South America, but its karyotype has 2n = 50, while the latter's was initially described as having 2n = 68–70. However, a more recent description gives the red brocket a variable karyotype with 2n ranging from 48 to 54, suggesting that it represents several species. It is sympatric with the Yucatan brown brocket (Odocoileus pandora) over part of its range. Additionally, it was estimated that M. temama diverged from other red brocket deer about 2 million years ago. This was estimated through analysis of concatenated sequences from the mitochondrial gene ND2, Cytb, and tRNA-Pro-Control region.

== Habitat and range ==
Mazama temama is found in primary and secondary tropical forests, from sea level to cloud forest habitat at elevations of around 2,800 m (9,190 ft).

In the northern reaches of its range, M. temama is known from the northeastern Mexican states of San Luís Toposí, Tamaulipas and Veracruz, not typically being found to the west of the Sierra Gorda. Its distribution continues south through the states of Guanajuato, Hidalgo and Puebla and regions east of Mexico City. In the southern parts of the country, being a more tropic-adapted deer species, it may be found with somewhat more frequency in Campeche, Chiapas, Oaxaca, Quintana Roo, Tabasco and Yucatán states. It is also known from Belize, Guatemala, Honduras, Nicaragua, Costa Rica and Panama, extending into north and north-central Colombia via the Darién Gap, where it is known from as far south as Antioquia Department and east of the capital, Bogotá.

== Conservation ==
In Mexico, it is regarded as an agricultural pest by some legume farmers. It is likely threatened in some areas by hunting and deforestation. Due to a relative lack of information, M. temama is listed as "Data Deficient" on the IUCN Red List.
