= Mérida brocket =

Conservation status
- Vulnerable (IUCN 3.1)

Scientific classification
- Kingdom: Animalia
- Phylum: Chordata
- Class: Mammalia
- Order: Artiodactyla
- Family: Cervidae
- Subfamily: Capreolinae
- Genus: Mazama
- Species: M. bricenii

Binomial name
- Mazama bricenii (Thomas, 1908)
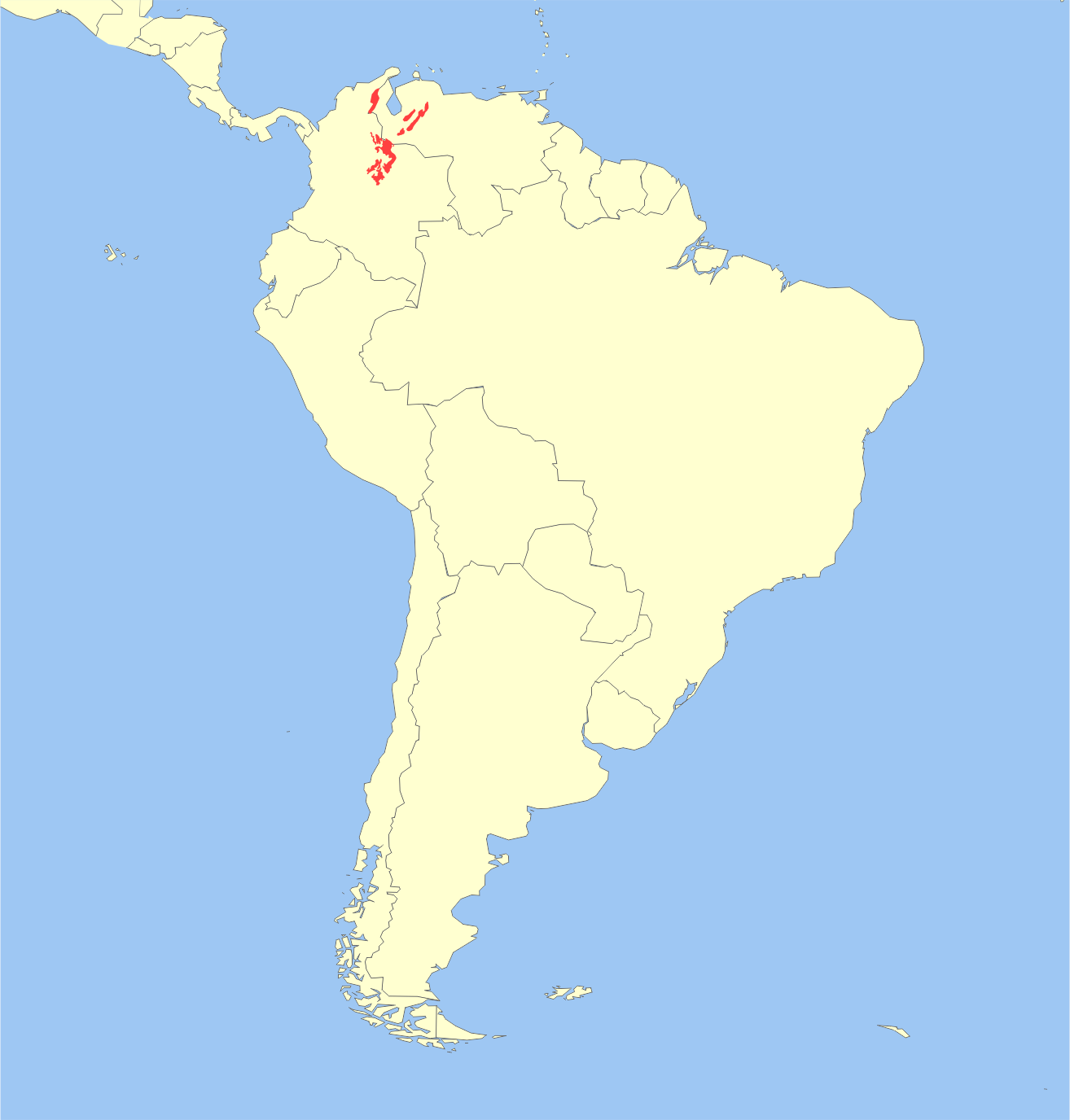

Species of deer

The Mérida brocket (Mazama bricenii), also known as the Meroia brocket or rufous brocket, is a small species of deer. It is found in forest and páramo at altitudes of 1,000–3,500 metres (3,300–11,500 ft) in the Andes of northern Colombia and western Venezuela. It was once treated as a subspecies of the similar little red brocket, but has been considered a distinct species since 1987, though as recent as 1999 some maintained it as a subspecies.
