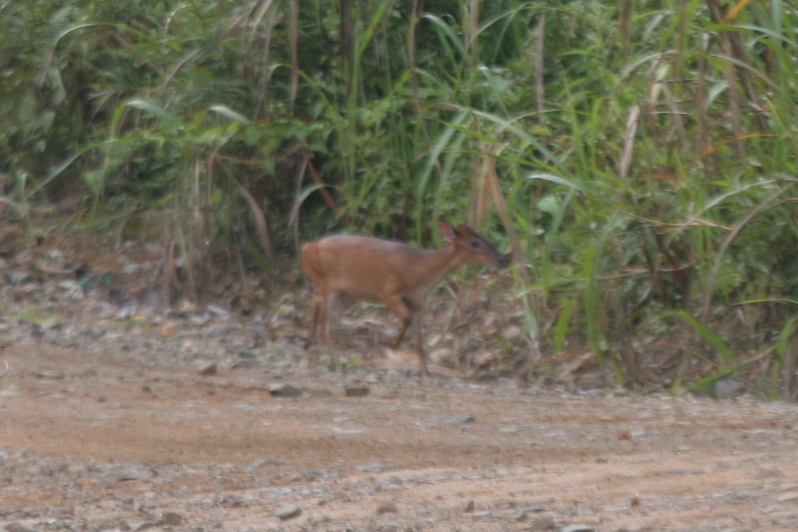

Conservation status
- Near Threatened (IUCN 3.1)

Scientific classification
- Kingdom: Animalia
- Phylum: Chordata
- Class: Mammalia
- Order: Artiodactyla
- Family: Cervidae
- Genus: Muntiacus
- Species: M. atherodes

Binomial name
- Muntiacus atherodes Groves & Grubb, 1982

= Bornean yellow muntjac =

Species of deer

The Bornean yellow muntjac (Muntiacus atherodes) is a muntjac deer species, endemic to the moist forests of the island of Borneo.

== Taxonomy ==
It lives alongside the common muntjac. It is similar to its much more common cousin and was only recognised as a separate species in 1982.

== Distribution ==
It lives only on the island of Borneo. It has been documented in the protected forests of Sarawak and in logged forests of Bintulu. Long thought to be almost extinct in Kinabatangan, a photo of one was captured via a HUTAN camera trap.

== Description ==
Apart from the color difference, its antlers, which are just 7 cm (2.8 in) in length, are smaller than those of the common muntjac. It has not been extensively studied and has been described as a relict species.

== Ecology ==
This muntjac species is a potential prey of the Bornean tiger.
