= Dwarf brocket =

Conservation status
- Vulnerable (IUCN 3.1)

Scientific classification
- Kingdom: Animalia
- Phylum: Chordata
- Class: Mammalia
- Order: Artiodactyla
- Family: Cervidae
- Subfamily: Capreolinae
- Genus: Subulo
- Species: S. chunyi

Binomial name
- Subulo chunyi Hershkovitz, 1959
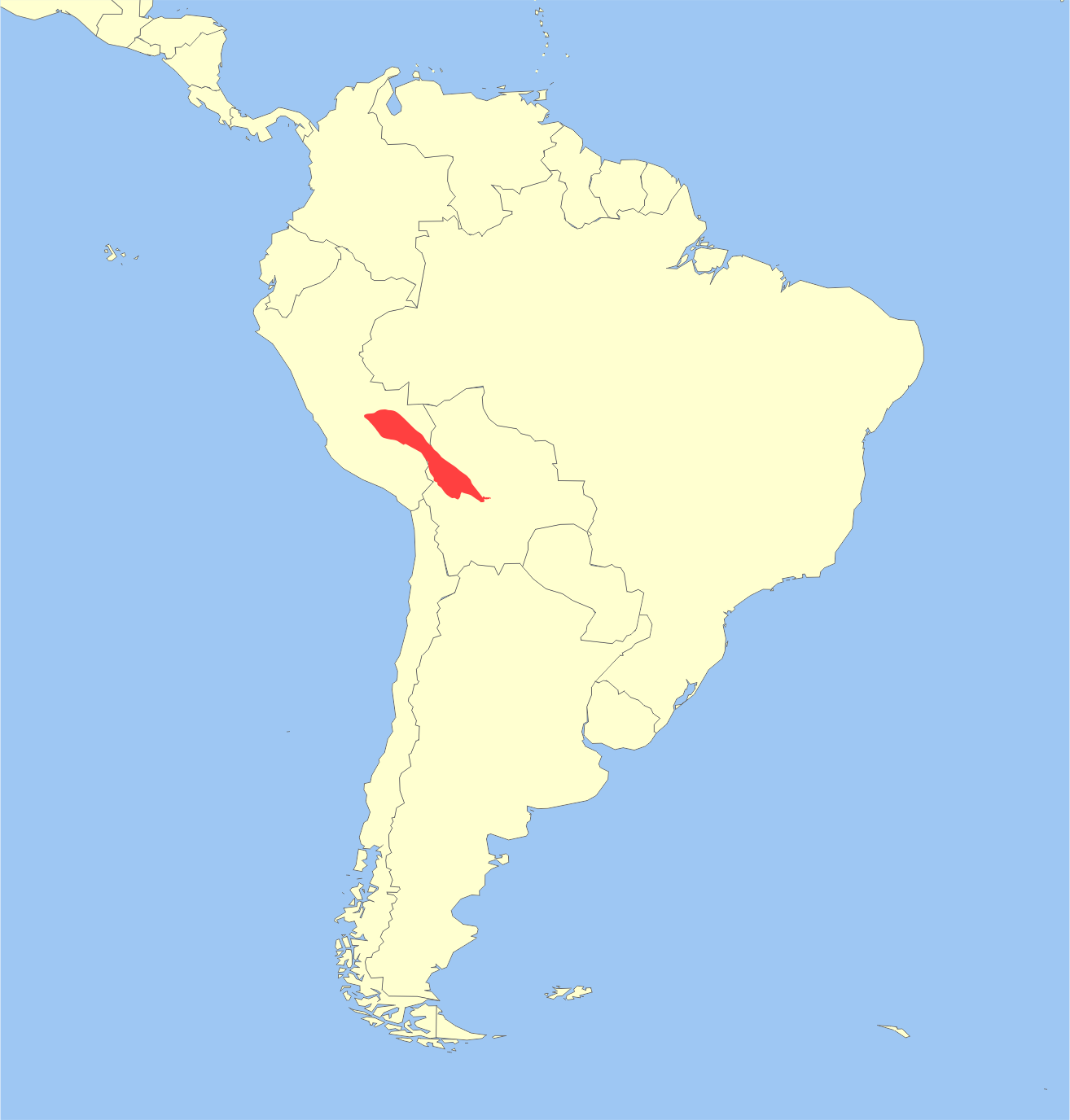

Species of deer

The dwarf brocket (Subulo chunyi), or chunyi, is a small species of deer native to the Andean highlands in western Bolivia and southeastern Peru, where it is found in forest and páramo. Its pelage is reddish-brown with dark grey foreparts and neck. The underparts are lighter brown, and the muzzle short and thick. It weighs around 11 kg (24 lb).

A little-studied species of brocket deer, the IUCN considers the dwarf brocket as Vulnerable. Research has occurred in the forests of Bolivia, expanding known localities and modelling geographic distribution; while as much as 40% of the habitat was degraded or fragmented, the rest showed good conservation. This led to the recommendation of treating it as Vulnerable.
