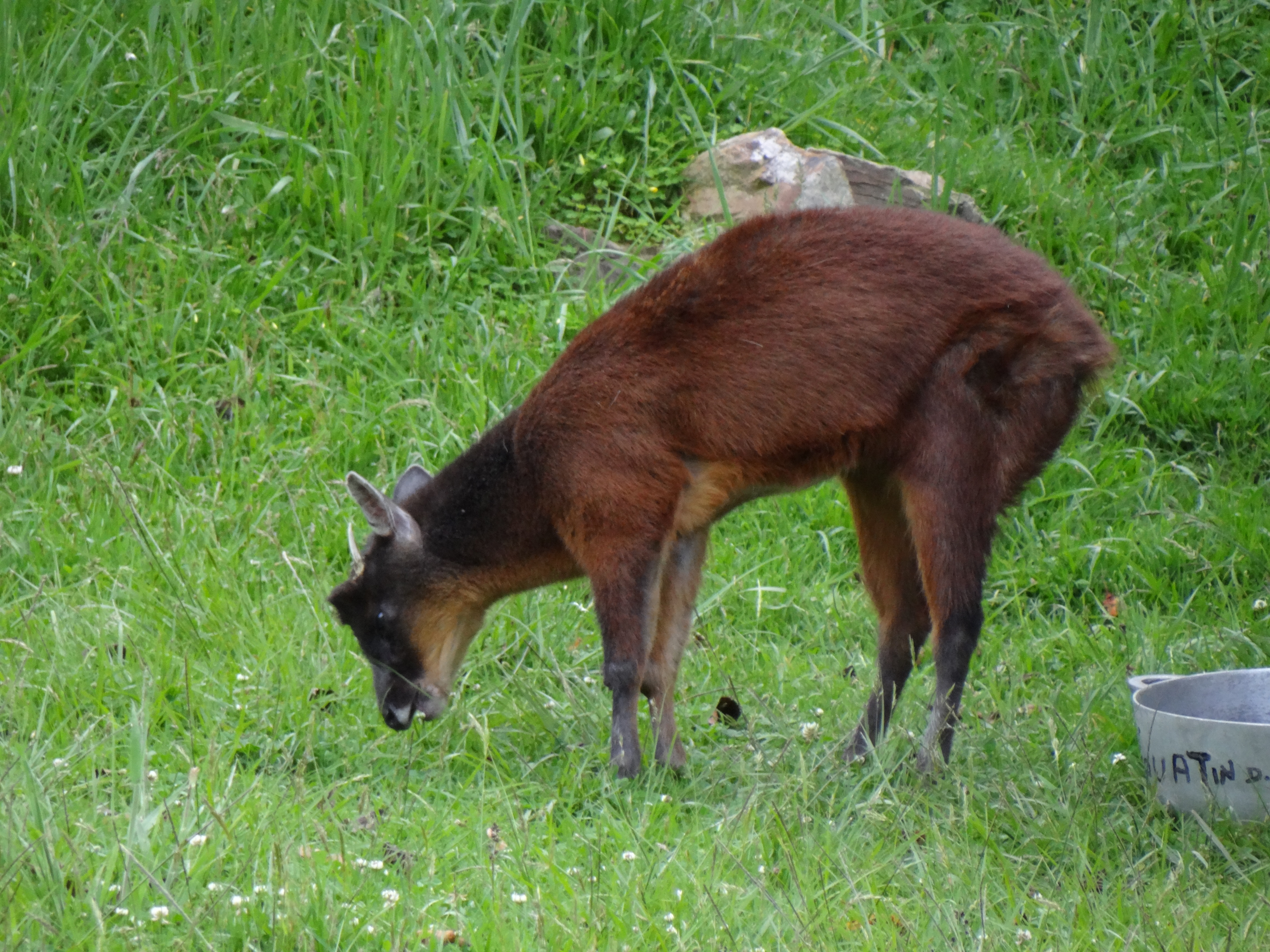

Conservation status
- Vulnerable (IUCN 3.1)

Scientific classification
- Kingdom: Animalia
- Phylum: Chordata
- Class: Mammalia
- Infraclass: Placentalia
- Order: Artiodactyla
- Family: Cervidae
- Subfamily: Capreolinae
- Tribe: Odocoileini
- Genus: Andinocervus; Ramirez-Chaves, Morales-Martinez, Cardona-Giraldo, Ossa-Lopez, Rivera-Paez & Noguera-Urbano, 2025
- Species: A. rufinus

Binomial name
- Andinocervus rufinus (Pucheran, 1851)
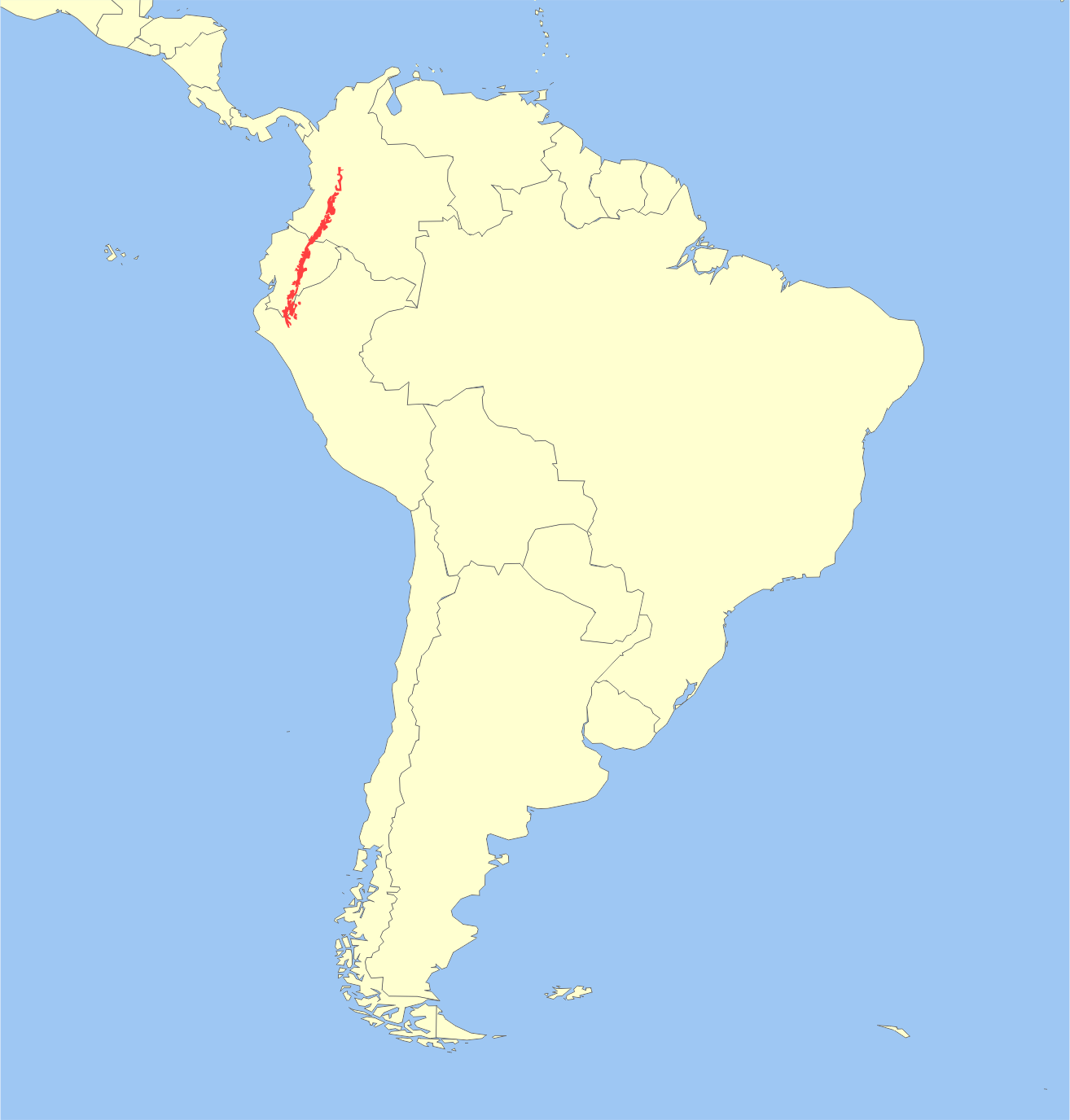

= Little red brocket =

Species of deer

The little red brocket or swamp brocket (Andinocervus rufinus), also known as the Ecuador red brocket, is a small, little-studied deer native to the Andes of Colombia, Ecuador and northern Peru, where found in forest and páramo at altitudes between 1,400 and 3,600 metres (4,600 and 11,800 ft). It is one of the smallest brocket deer. The coat is reddish, and the legs and crown are blackish. It was previously assigned to the genus Mazama, and as recently as 1999, some authorities included both the pygmy brocket (M. nana) and Merida brocket (M. bricenii) as subspecies of the little red brocket.

The little red brocket may have formed an important part of the diet of the people of the Pleistocene Las Vegas culture.
