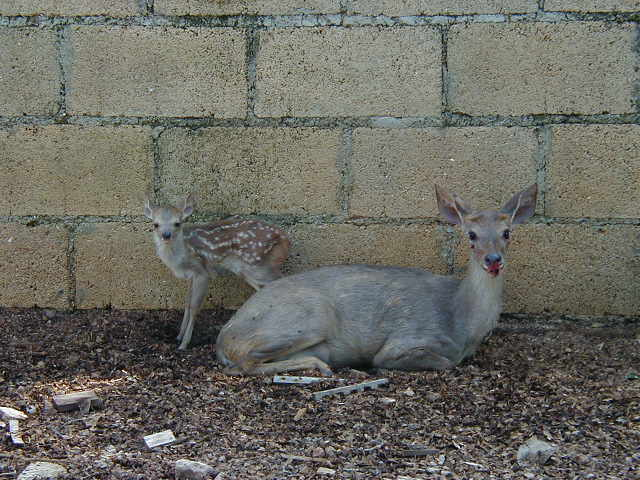

Conservation status
- Vulnerable (IUCN 3.1)

Scientific classification
- Kingdom: Animalia
- Phylum: Chordata
- Class: Mammalia
- Order: Artiodactyla
- Family: Cervidae
- Subfamily: Capreolinae
- Genus: Odocoileus
- Species: O. pandora

Binomial name
- Odocoileus pandora (Merriam, 1901)
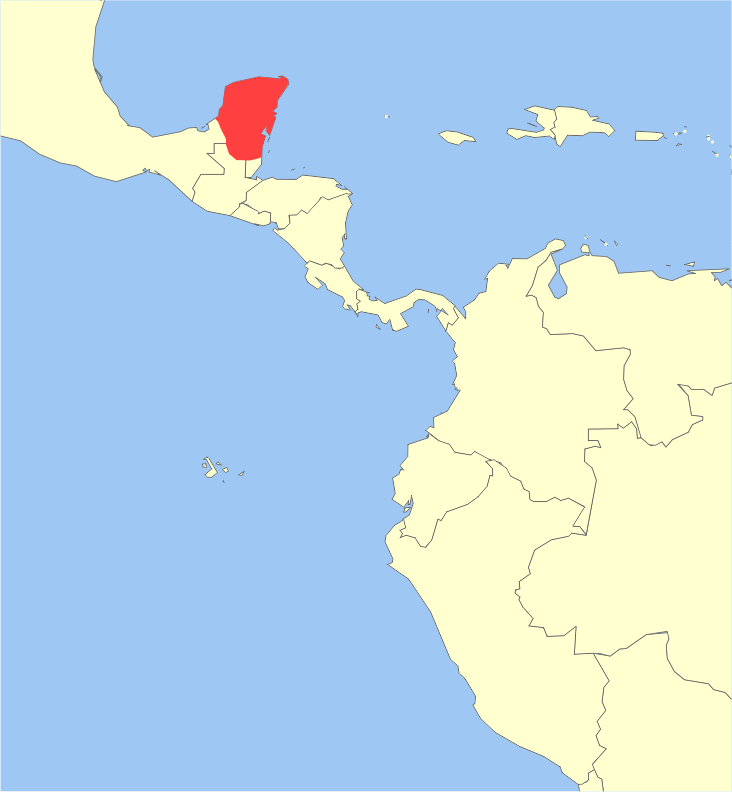

Synonyms
- Mazama pandora Merriam, 1901

= Yucatan brown brocket =

Species of deer

The Yucatan brown brocket (Odocoileus pandora) is a small species of deer native to Central America.

== Taxonomy ==
It has been previously treated as a disjunct subspecies of the gray brocket (Mazama gouazoubira) or a subspecies of the red brocket (M. americana). In 2021, the American Society of Mammalogists placed it in the genus Odocoileus.

== Description ==
Among other features, the Yucatan brown brocket differs from both the red brocket and the gray brocket in the shape and measurements of the skull and antlers. It also differs from the Central American red brocket (M. temama) which is locally sympatric with the Yucatan brown brocket, in its gray-brown, rather than overall reddish, color.

== Distribution and habitat ==
O. pandora is found in the Yucatán Peninsula of Mexico, Belize and Guatemala. While it is found in humid tropical forest like most other brocket deer, the Yucatan brown brocket also ranges across arid, relatively open habitats.

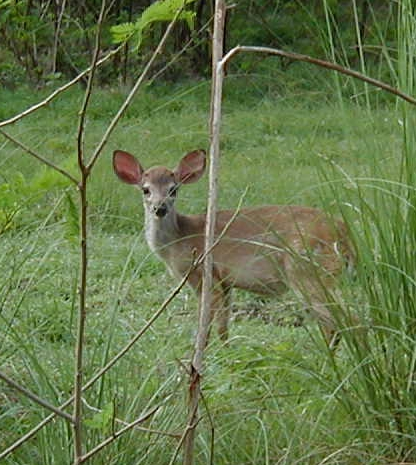
Odocoileus pandora
