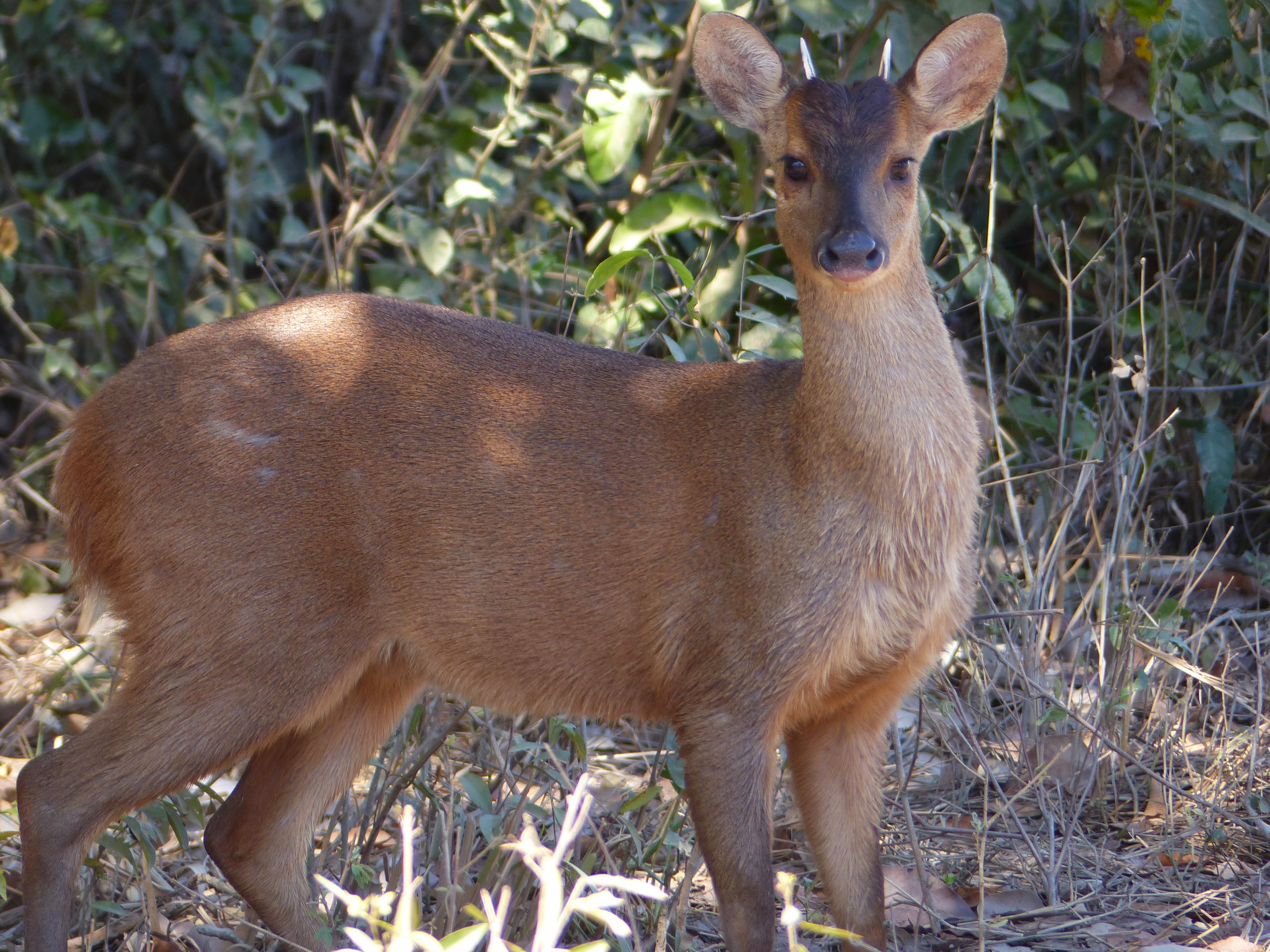

Conservation status
- Data Deficient (IUCN 3.1)

Scientific classification
- Kingdom: Animalia
- Phylum: Chordata
- Class: Mammalia
- Order: Artiodactyla
- Family: Cervidae
- Subfamily: Capreolinae
- Genus: Mazama
- Species: M. americana

Binomial name
- Mazama americana (Erxleben, 1777)
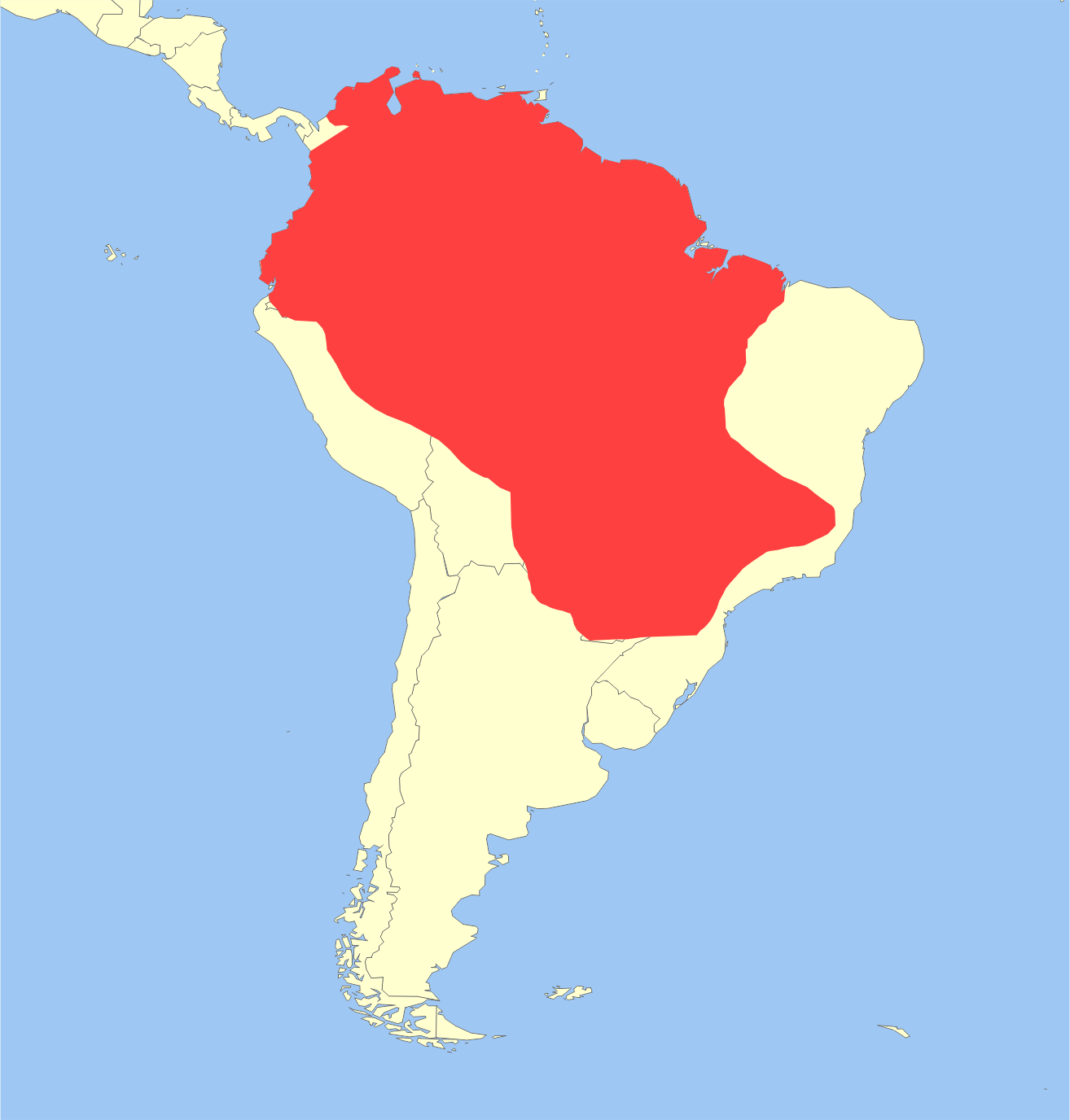

= Red brocket =

Species of deer

The red brocket (Mazama americana) is a species of brocket deer from forests in South America, ranging from northern Argentina to Colombia and the Guianas. It also occurs on the Caribbean island of Trinidad (it also occurred on the island of Tobago until very recent historical times, but has been extirpated there).

== Taxonomy ==
It formerly included the Central American red brocket (M. temama) and sometimes the Yucatan brown brocket (M. pandora) as subspecies. Considerable taxonomic confusion still exists for the populations remaining in the red brocket. Pending a solution to this, it has been evaluated as data deficient by the IUCN, though as presently defined, it is the most widespread species of brocket. It is sympatric with the smaller Amazonian brown brocket over much of its range (the latter tends to have significantly lower population densities). The karyotype of the red brocket was initially described as having 2n = 68, FN = 74, and more recently as having 2n varying from 48 to 54 and FN varying from 54 to 56. This variability may indicate the presence of unrecognized species in the population.

== Description ==
Its body is reddish-brown in color, with a lighter grayish-brown head and neck, and partially blackish legs. The inner thighs and the underside of the tail are white. Fawns are spotted white and lack blackish to the legs. Only the adult male has antlers, and these are small and spike-like. This species is the largest of the brockets. The shoulder height is 67–80 cm (26–31 in) and the head and body length 105–144 cm (41–57 in). These deer typically weigh 24–48 kg (53–106 lb), but exceptional males may get as large as 65 kg (143 lb).

== Diet and behaviour ==
The red brocket browses on vegetation (mainly grasses and tender green roots), preferring fruit and seeds when it is available. They are also known to feed on fungi. In extreme cases where fruit and fungi become scarce, it may eat stems, bark, petioles, leaves, and animal matter instead. It is generally solitary and stays in dense jungles. When alarmed, the animal snorts or stomps its hooves.

== Hybrids ==
Hybridization with the pygmy brocket (Mazama nana) has been documented in captivity.

== Gallery ==
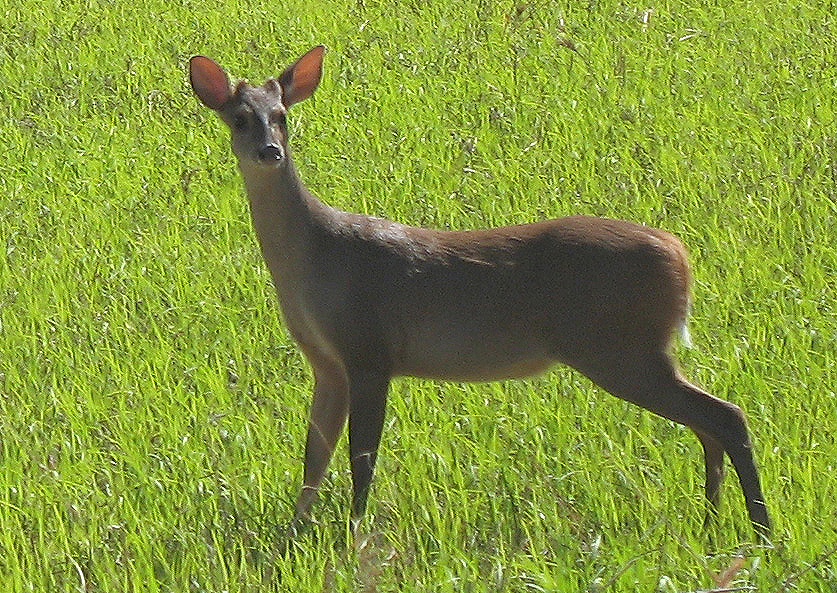
Mazama americana

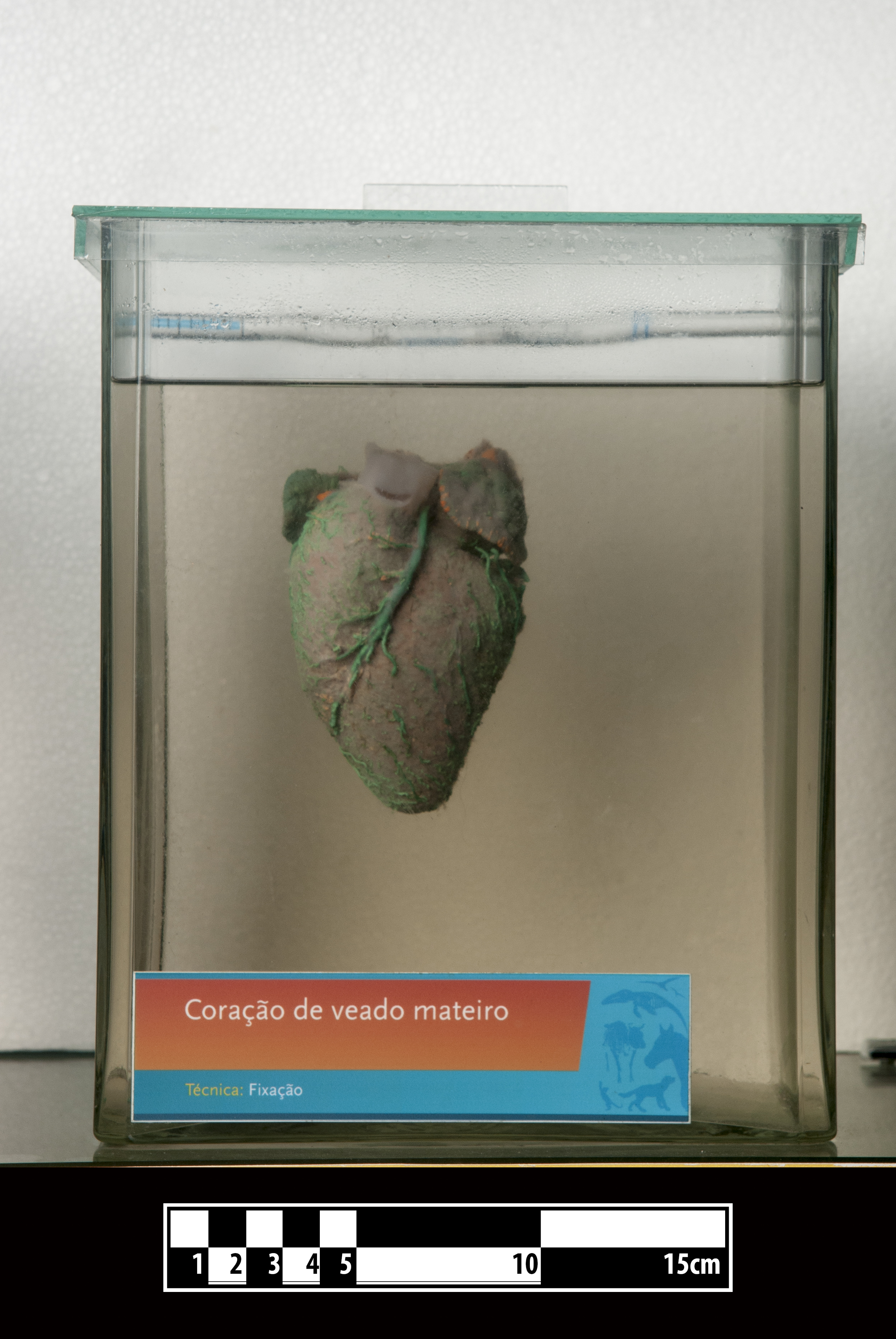
Red brocket heart, specimen clarified for visualization of anatomical structures

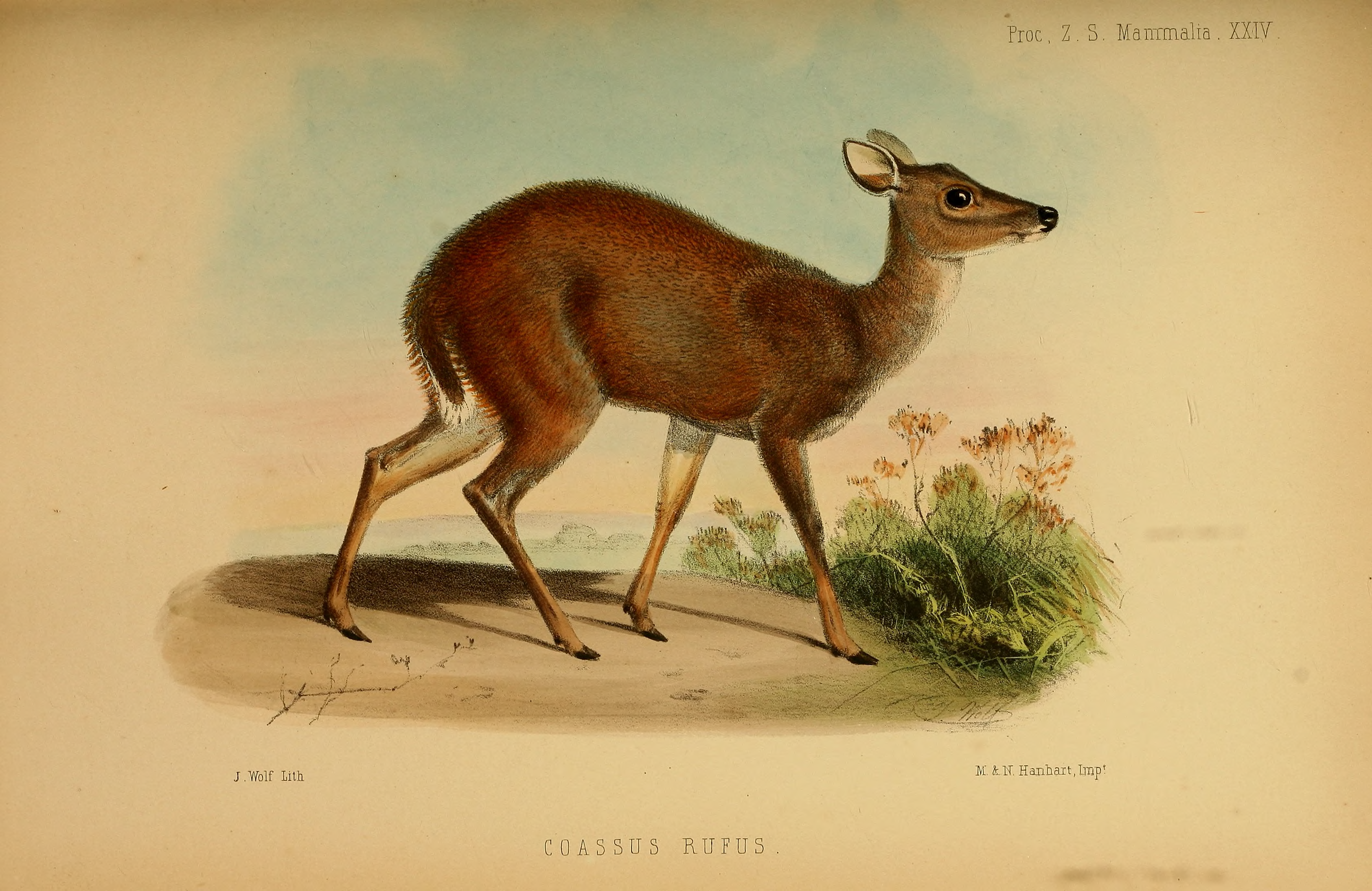

== Bibliography ==
- Emmons, L.H. (1997). Neotropical Rainforest Mammals, 2nd ed. University of Chicago Press ISBN 0-226-20721-8
