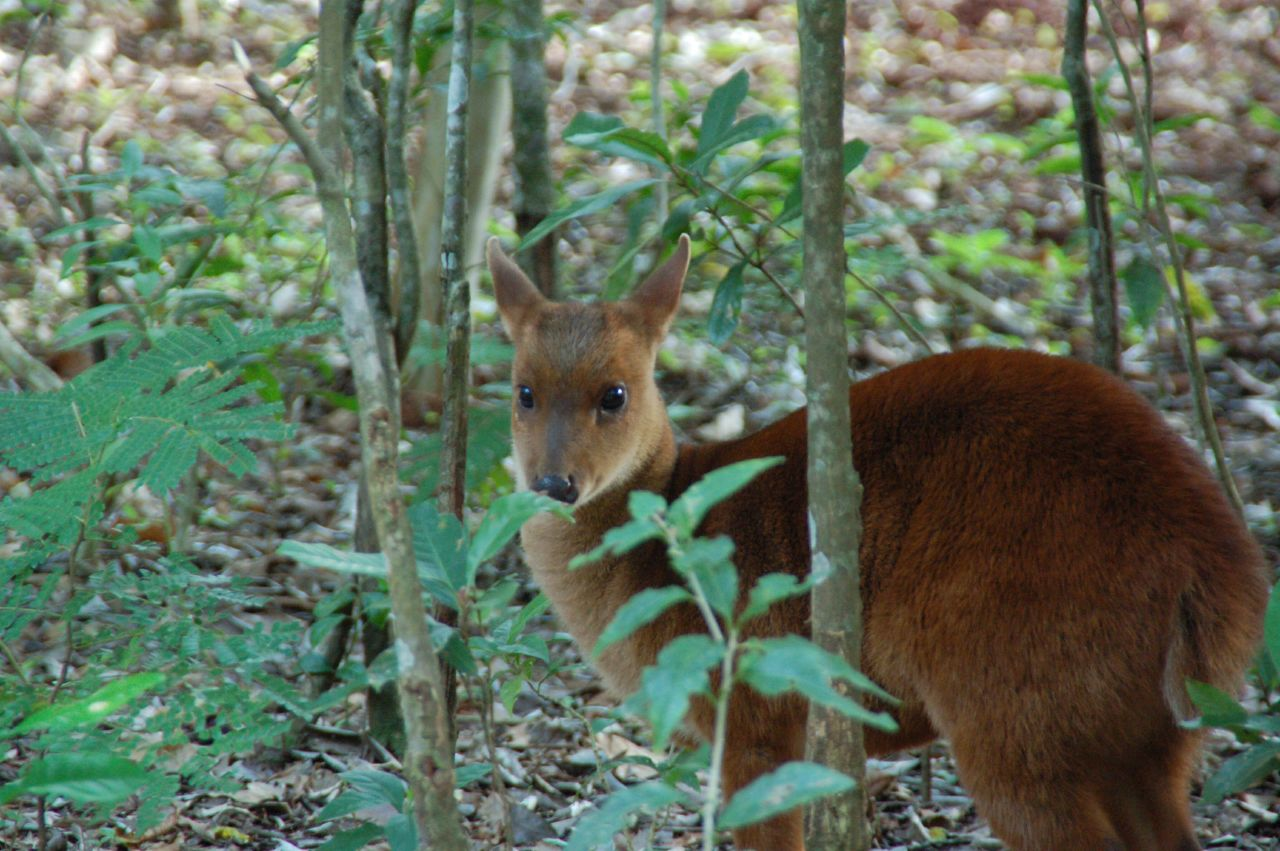

Conservation status
- Vulnerable (IUCN 3.1)

Scientific classification
- Kingdom: Animalia
- Phylum: Chordata
- Class: Mammalia
- Order: Artiodactyla
- Family: Cervidae
- Subfamily: Capreolinae
- Genus: Mazama
- Species: M. nana

Binomial name
- Mazama nana (Hensel, 1872)
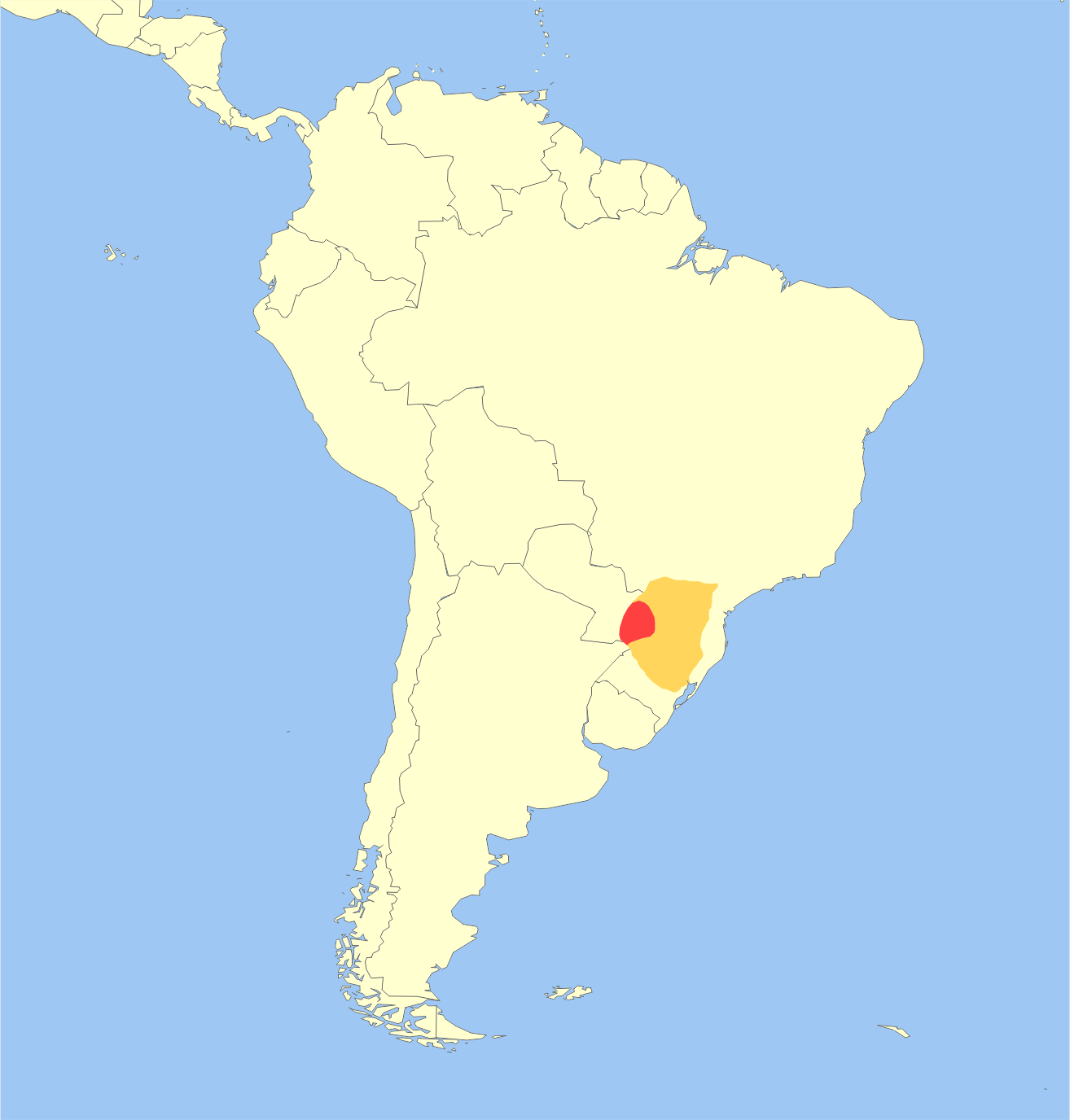
- Pygmy brocket distribution. Extant Possibly extant

= Pygmy brocket =

Species of deer

The pygmy brocket (Mazama nana) is a brocket deer species from South America. It is found in southern Brazil, Argentina and Paraguay. It is a small deer with short legs, weighing 15 to 20 kilograms (33 to 44 lb). It is reddish-brown in color.

This species is sometimes considered a subspecies of Mazama rufina.

== Hybrids with Mazama americana ==
The occurrence of hybrids between Mazama nana and Mazama americana was documented in captivity.
