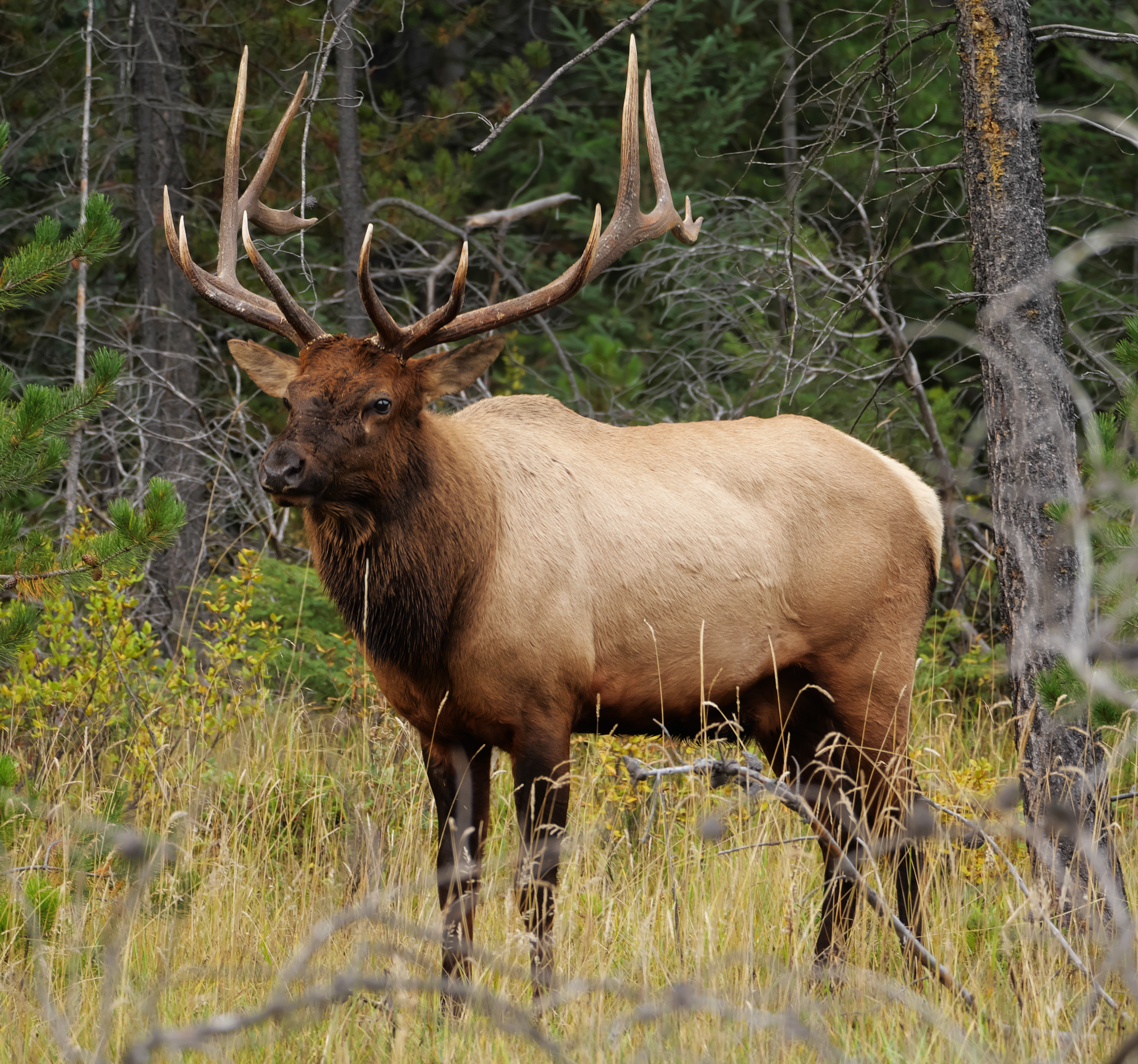
- A bull (male)
- female C. c. nelsoni both in Alberta, Canada

Conservation status
- Least Concern (IUCN 3.1)

Scientific classification
- Kingdom: Animalia
- Phylum: Chordata
- Class: Mammalia
- Order: Artiodactyla
- Family: Cervidae
- Genus: Cervus
- Species: C. canadensis

Binomial name
- Cervus canadensis (Erxleben, 1777)

Subspecies
- C. c. alashanicus; †C. c. canadensis; †C. c. combrayicus; C. c. kansuensis; C. c. macneilli; C. c. manitobensis; †C. c. merriami; C. c. nannodes; C. c. nelsoni; C. c. roosevelti; C. c. sibiricus; C. c. songaricus; C. c. wallichii; C. c. xanthopygus
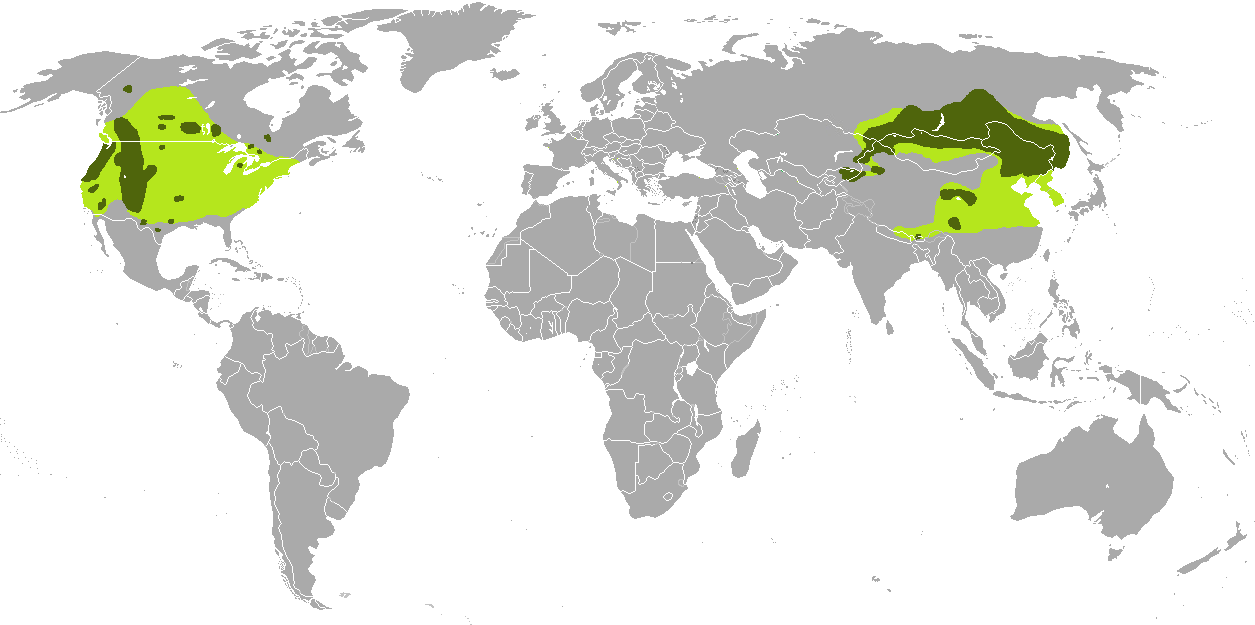
- Wapiti range map

Synonyms
- Various Cervus elaphus subspecies

= Elk =

Elk Temporal range: 2.5–0 Ma Early Pleistocene – Recent

Species of deer

The elk (pl.: elk or elks; Cervus canadensis) or wapiti (pronounced /ˈwɒpəti/) is the second largest species within the deer family, Cervidae, and one of the largest terrestrial mammals in its native range of North America and Central and East Asia. The word "elk" originally referred to the European variety of the moose, Alces alces, but was transferred to Cervus canadensis by North American colonists.

The name "wapiti" is derived from a Shawnee and Cree word meaning "white rump", after the distinctive light fur around the tail region which the animals may fluff-up or raise to signal their agitation or distress to one another, when fleeing perceived threats, or among males courting females and sparring for dominance. A similar trait is seen in other artiodactyl species, like the bighorn sheep, pronghorn and the white-tailed deer, to varying degrees.

Elk dwell in open forest and forest-edge habitats, grazing on grasses and sedges and browsing higher-growing plants, leaves, twigs and bark. Male elk have large, blood- and nerve-filled antlers, which they routinely shed each year as the weather warms. Males also engage in ritualized mating behaviors during the mating season, including posturing to attract females, antler-wrestling (sparring), and bugling, a loud series of throaty whistles, bellows, screams, and other vocalizations that establish dominance over other males and aim to attract females.

Elk were long believed to belong to a subspecies of the European red deer (Cervus elaphus), but evidence from many mitochondrial DNA genetic studies, beginning in 1998, shows that the two are distinct species. The elk's wider rump-patch and paler-hued antlers are key morphological differences that distinguish C. canadensis from C. elaphus. Although it is currently only native to North America, and Central, East and North Asia, elk once had a much wider distribution in the past; prehistoric populations were present across Eurasia and into Western Europe during the Late Pleistocene, surviving into the early Holocene in Southern Sweden and the Alps. The now-extinct North American Merriam's elk subspecies (Cervus canadensis merriami) once ranged south into Mexico. The wapiti has also successfully adapted to countries outside of its natural range where it has been introduced, including Argentina and New Zealand; the animal's adaptability in these areas may, in fact, be so successful as to threaten the sensitive endemic ecosystems and species it encounters.

As a member of the Artiodactyla order (and distant relative of the Bovidae), elk are susceptible to several infectious diseases which can be transmitted to or from domesticated livestock. Efforts to eliminate infectious diseases from elk populations, primarily by vaccination, have had mixed success. Some cultures revere the elk as having spiritual significance. Antlers and velvet are used in traditional medicines in parts of Asia; the production of ground antler and velvet supplements is also a thriving naturopathic industry in several countries, including the United States, China and Canada. The elk is hunted as a game species, and their meat is lean and higher in protein than beef or chicken.

== Naming and etymology ==
The word "elk" originally denoted the moose, Alces alces. (Note: According to the Oxford English Dictionary, the word is of "obscure history". It appeared in Old English as elh and elch, but the modern form is not the "normal phonetic representative" of these, suggesting that it was borrowed from Middle High German elch.) This animal had vanished from Britain by the end of the first millennium, and the meaning of the word therefore became rather vague to English-speakers. When settlers in the New World encountered both Alces alces and another large cervid, Cervus canadensis, they transferred the term "elk" to the latter. The former came to be known as the "moose", a word borrowed from an Algonquian language.

The alternative name "wapiti" derives from the Shawnee and Cree word waapiti (in Cree syllabics, ᐙᐱᑎ or ᐚᐱᑎ), meaning "white rump". There is a subspecies of wapiti in Mongolia called the Altai wapiti (Cervus canadensis sibiricus).

Cervus canadensis was recognized as a relative of the red deer (Cervus elaphus) of Europe, and wapitis were hence sometimes referred to as "red deer". Richard Hakluyt describes North America as a "lande ... full of many beastes, as redd dere" in his Discourse Concerning Western Planting (1584). Sir William Talbot's 1672 English translation of John Lederer's Latin Discoveries likewise calls the species "red deer", but notes in parentheses that they are "for their unusual largeness improperly termed Elks by ignorant people". Both Thomas Jefferson's Notes on the State of Virginia (1785) and David Bailie Warden's Statistical, Political, and Historical Account of the United States (1816) use "red deer" to refer to Cervus canadensis.

== Taxonomy ==
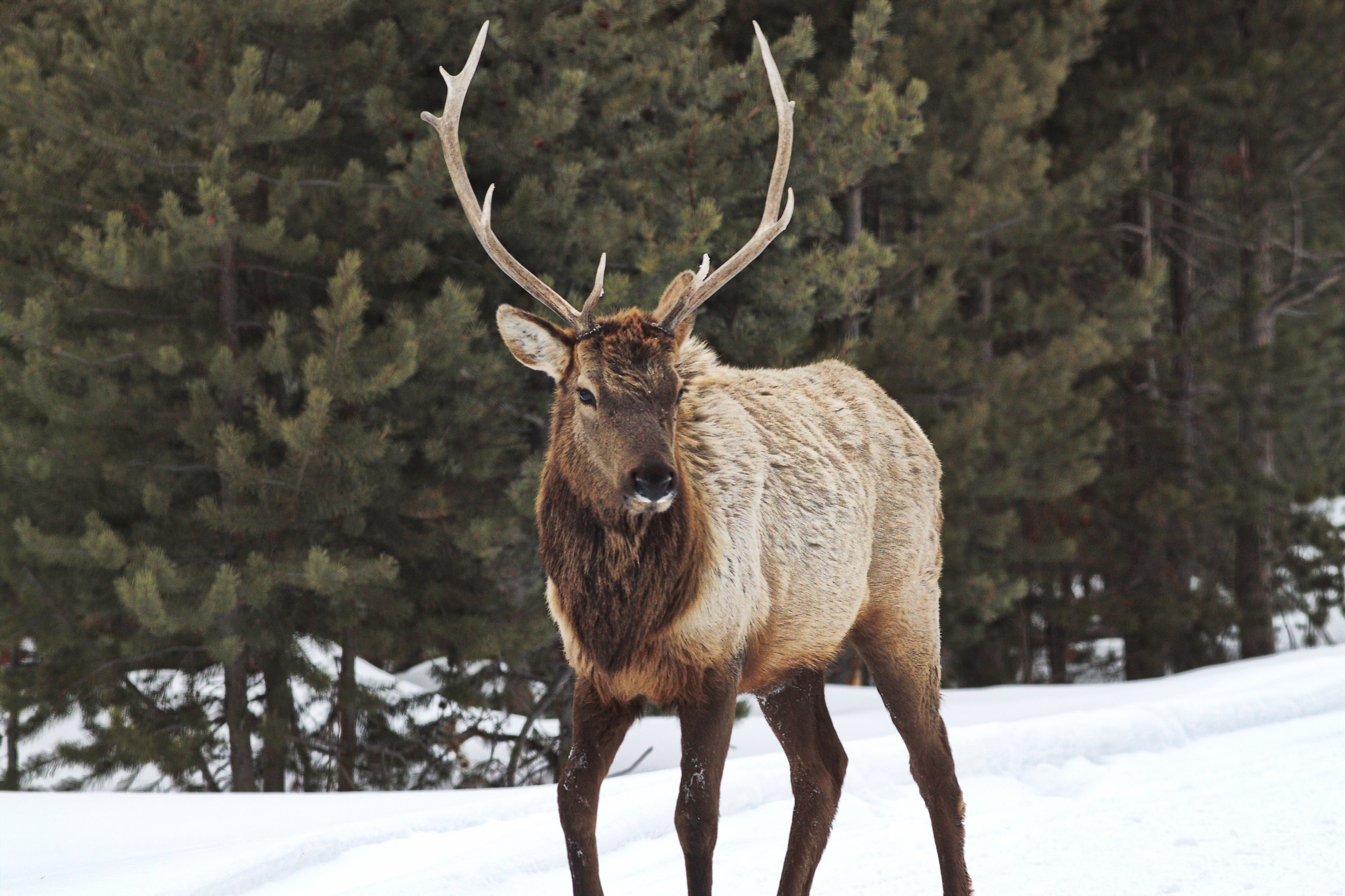
Male elk in snow at Yellowstone National Park, Wyoming, USA

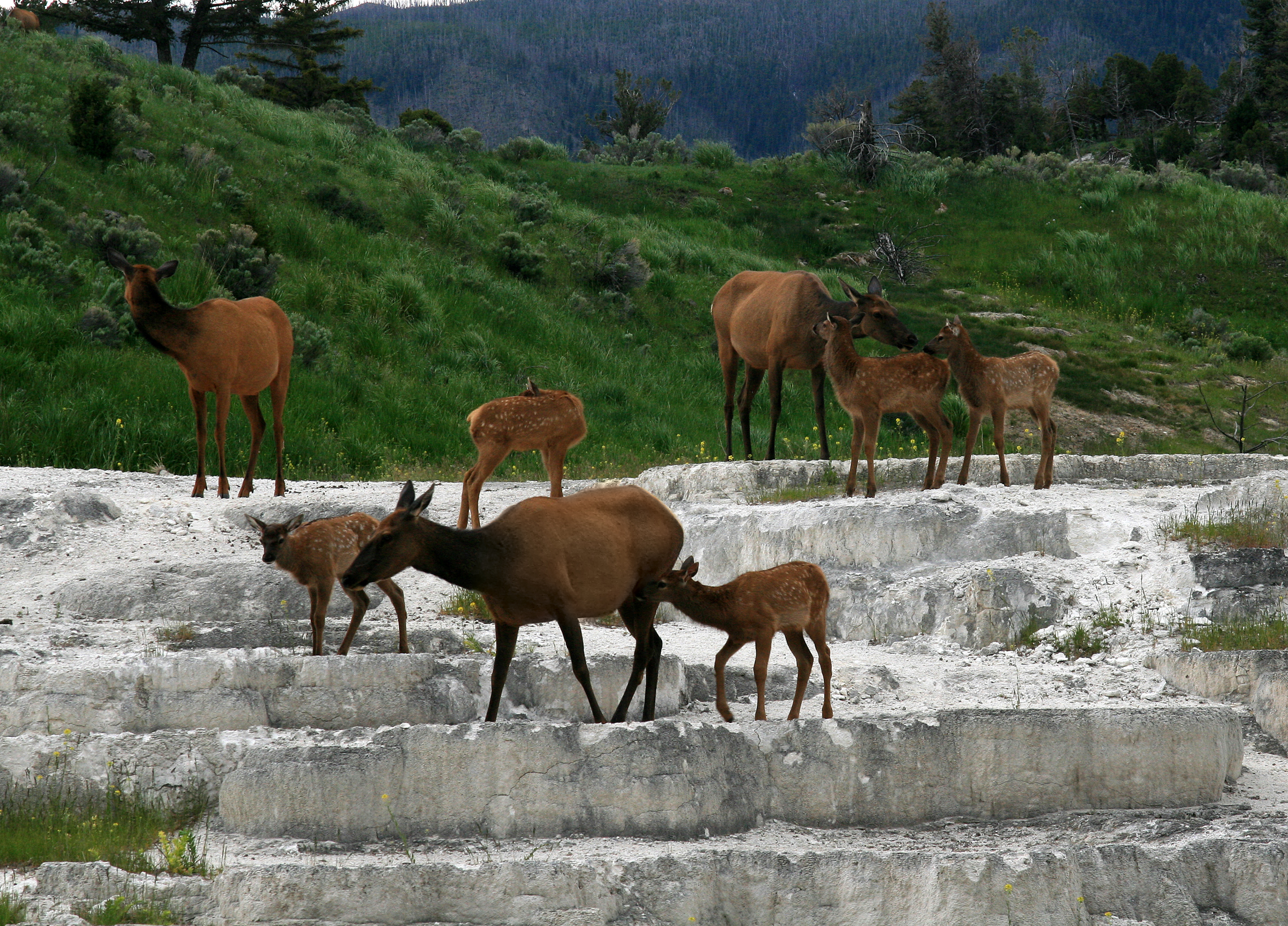
Elk crossing Opal Terrace at Mammoth Hot Springs, Yellowstone

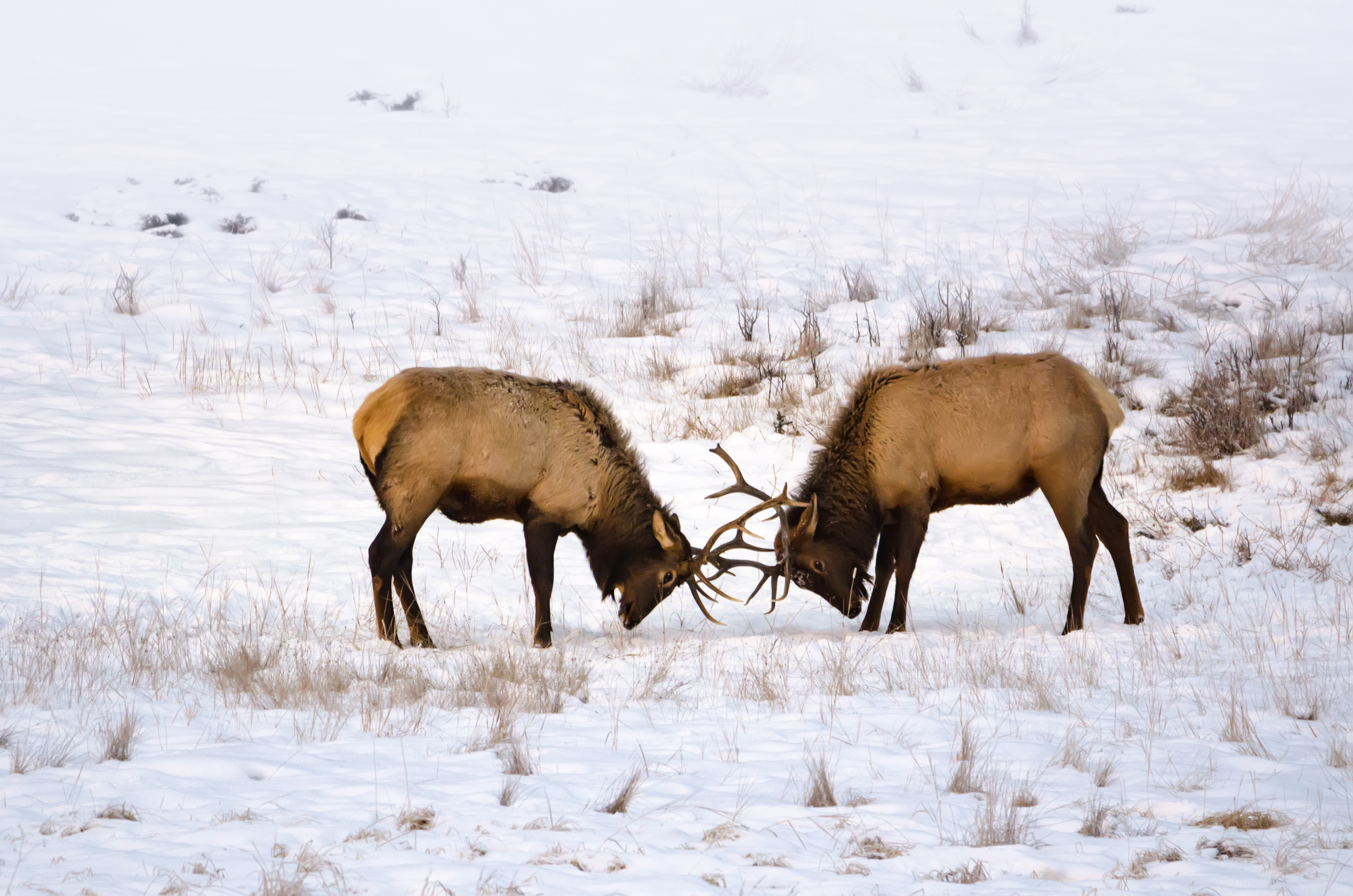
Sparring bull elk in Banff National Park, Canada

Members of the genus Cervus (and hence early relatives or possible ancestors of the elk) first appear in the fossil record 25 million years ago, during the Oligocene in Eurasia, but do not appear in the North American fossil record until the early Miocene. The extinct Irish elk (Megaloceros) was not a member of the genus Cervus but rather the largest member of the wider deer family (Cervidae) known from the fossil record.

Until recently, red deer and elk were considered to be one species, Cervus elaphus, with over a dozen subspecies. But mitochondrial DNA studies conducted in 2004 on hundreds of samples from red deer and elk subspecies and other species of the Cervus deer family, strongly indicate that elk, or wapiti, should be a distinct species, namely Cervus canadensis. DNA evidence validates that elk are more closely related to Thorold's deer (C. albirostris) and even sika deer (C. nippon) than they are to the red deer.

Elk and red deer produce fertile offspring in captivity, and the two species have freely inter-bred in New Zealand's Fiordland National Park. The cross-bred animals have resulted in the disappearance of virtually all pure elk blood from the area. Key morphological differences that distinguish C. canadensis from C. elaphus are the former's wider rump patch and paler-hued antlers.

=== Subspecies ===
There are numerous subspecies of elk described, with six from North America and four from Asia, although some taxonomists consider them different ecotypes or races of the same species (adapted to local environments through minor changes in appearance and behavior). Populations vary in antler shape and size, body size, coloration and mating behavior. DNA investigations of the Eurasian subspecies revealed that phenotypic variation in antlers, mane and rump patch development are based on "climatic-related lifestyle factors". Of the six subspecies of elk known to have inhabited North America in historical times, four remain, including the Roosevelt (C. canadensis roosevelti), Tule (C. c. nannodes), Manitoban (C. c. manitobensis) and Rocky Mountain elk (C. c. nelsoni). The eastern elk (C. c. canadensis) and Merriam's elk (C. c. merriami) subspecies have been extinct for at least a century.

Four subspecies described from the Asian continent include the Altai wapiti (C. c. sibiricus) and the Tianshan wapiti (C. c. songaricus). Two distinct subspecies found in China, Mongolia, the Korean Peninsula and Siberia are the Manchurian wapiti (C. c. xanthopygus) and the Alashan wapiti (C. c. alashanicus). The Manchurian subspecies is darker, and more reddish, in coloration than other populations. The Alashan wapiti of northern Central China is the smallest of all the subspecies, has the lightest coloration, and is one of the least-studied.

Recent DNA analyses suggest that there are no more than three or four total subspecies of elk. All American forms, aside from possibly the Tule and the Roosevelt's elk, seem to belong to one subspecies—Cervus c. canadensis; even the Siberian elk (C. c. sibiricus) is, more or less, physically identical to the American forms, and thus may belong to this subspecies, too. However, the Manchurian wapiti (C. c. xanthopygus) is clearly distinct from the Siberian forms, but not distinguishable from the Alashan wapiti. Still, due to the insufficient genetic material that rejects monophyly of C. canadensis, some researchers consider it premature to include the Manchurian wapiti as a true subspecies of wapiti, and that it likely needs to be elevated to its own species, C. xanthopygus. The Chinese forms (the Sichuan deer, Kansu red deer, and Tibetan red deer) also belong to the wapiti, and were not distinguishable from each other by mitochondrial DNA studies. These Chinese subspecies are sometimes treated as a distinct species, namely the Central Asian red deer (Cervus hanglu), which also includes the Kashmir stag.

- North American group
  - Roosevelt's elk (C. c. roosevelti)
  - Tule elk (C. c. nannodes)
  - Manitoban elk (C. c. manitobensis)
  - Rocky Mountain elk (C. c. nelsoni)
  - Eastern elk (C. c. canadensis; extinct)
  - Merriam's elk (C. c. merriami; extinct)
- Altai wapiti (C. c. sibiricus)
- Tian Shan wapiti (C. c. songaricus)
- Manchurian wapiti (C. c. xanthopygus)
- Alashan wapiti (C. c. alashanicus)
- Tibetan red deer (C. c. wallichii)
- Sichuan deer (C. c. macneilli)
- Kansu red deer (C. c. kansuensis)
C. c. roosevelti male

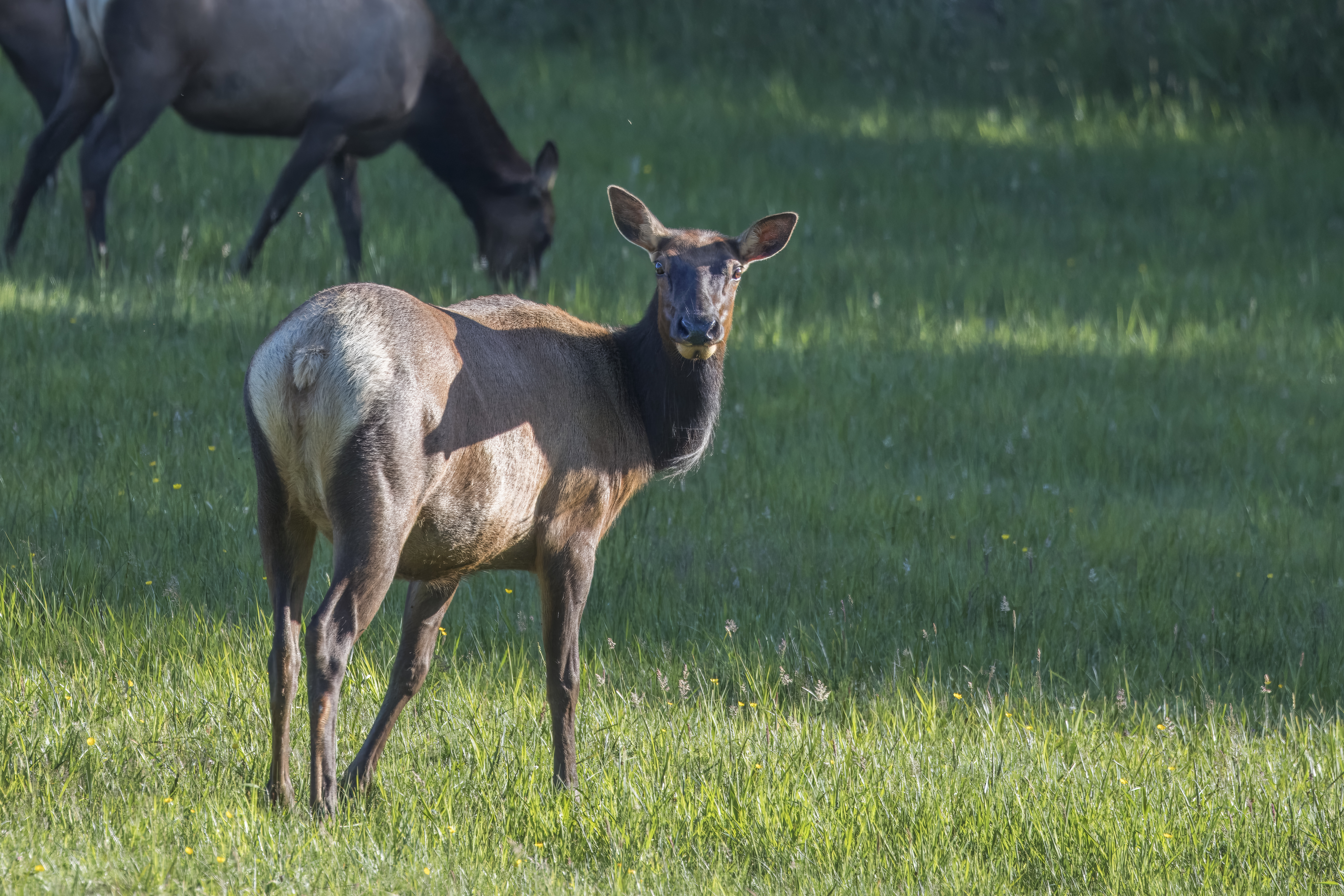
C. c. roosevelti female

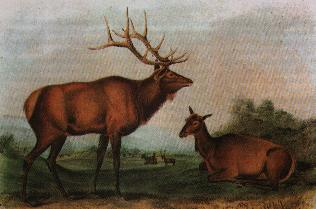
Artist's depiction of eastern elk

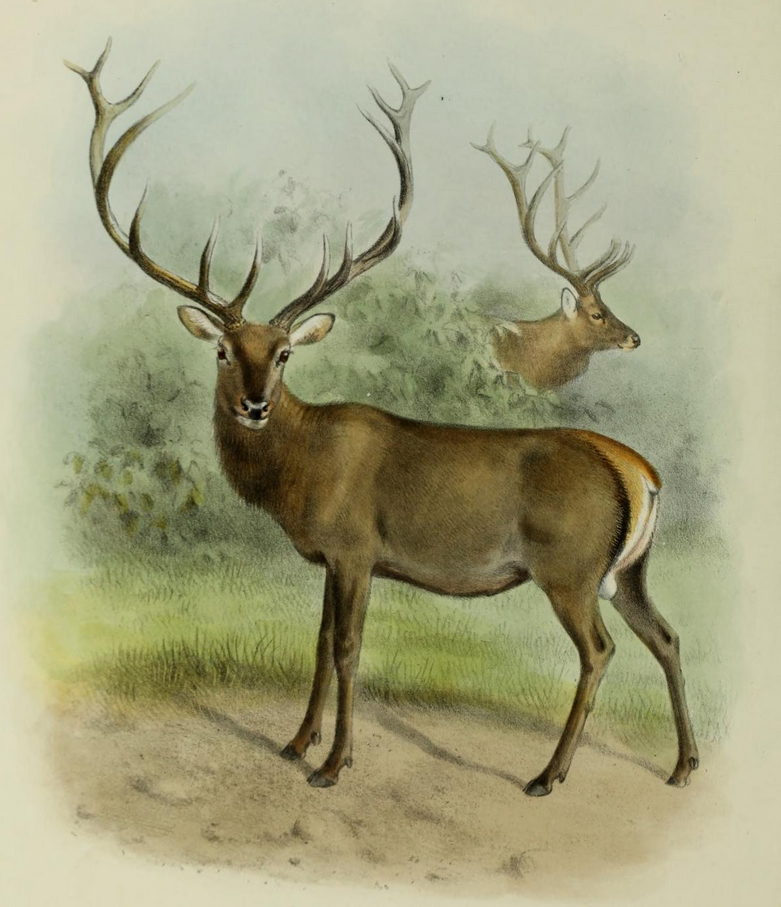
Illustration of Altai wapiti

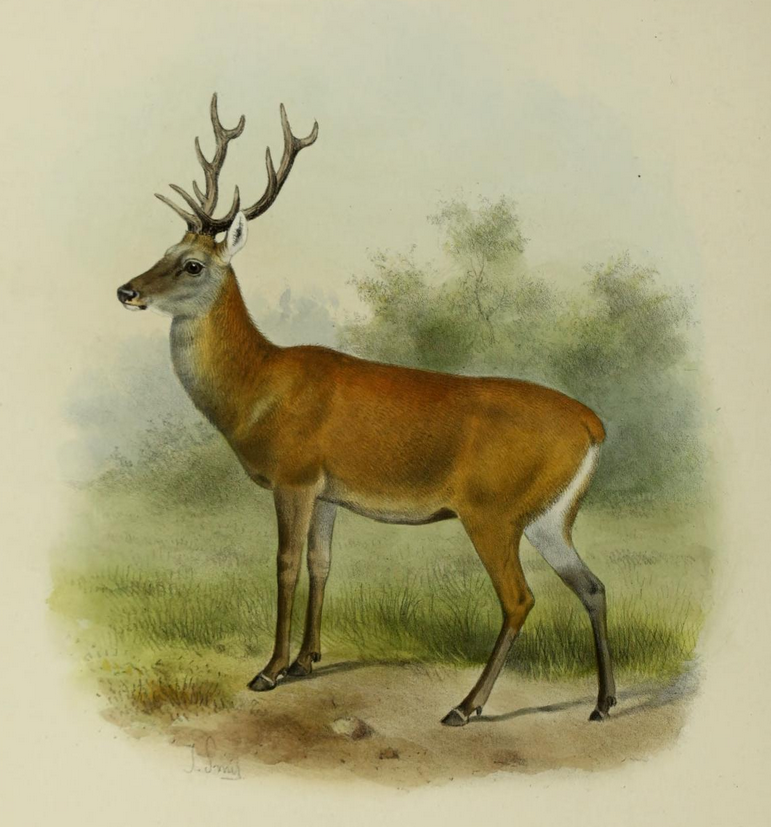
Illustration of Manchurian wapiti

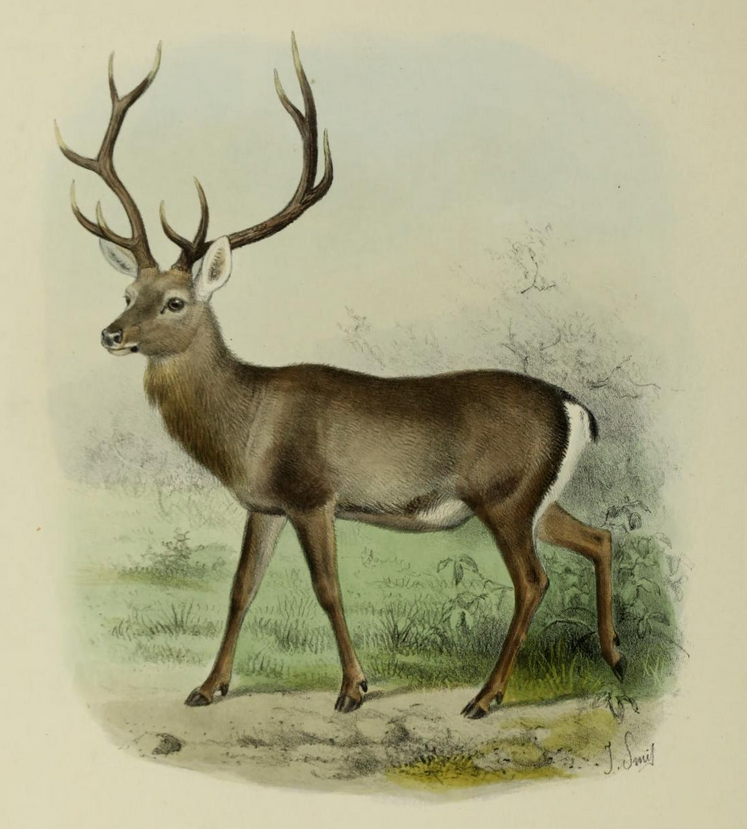
Illustration of Kashmir stag

== Characteristics ==
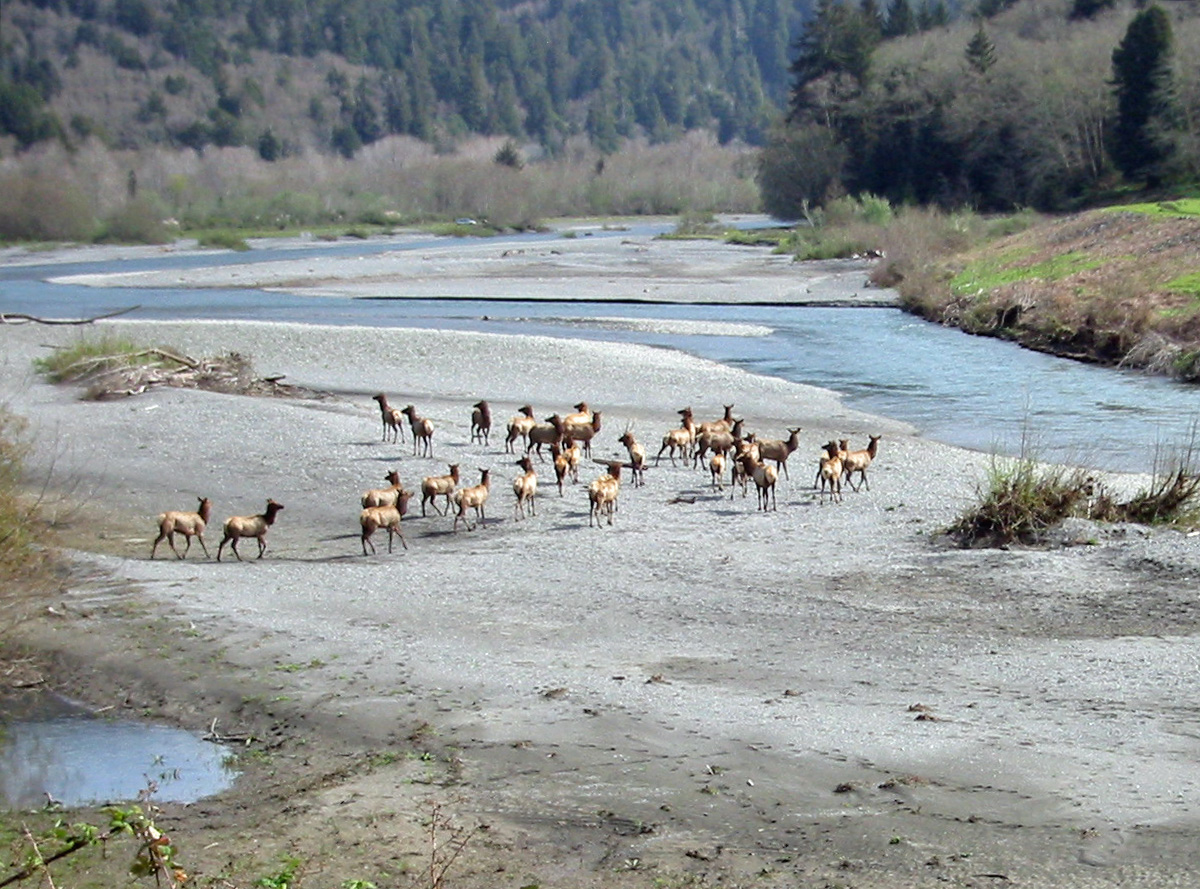
A herd of Roosevelt elk in California

Elk have thick bodies with slender legs and short tails. They have a shoulder height of 0.75–1.5 m (2 ft 6 in – 4 ft 11 in) with a nose-to-tail length of 1.6–2.7 m (5 ft 3 in – 8 ft 10 in). Males are larger and weigh 178–497 kg (392–1,096 lb) while females weigh 171–292 kg (377–644 lb). The largest of the subspecies is the Roosevelt elk (C. c. roosevelti), found west of the Cascade Range in the U.S. states of California, Oregon and Washington, and in the Canadian province of British Columbia. Roosevelt elk have been introduced into Alaska, where the largest males are estimated to weigh up to 600 kg (1,300 lb). More typically, male Roosevelt elk weigh around 318 to 499 kg (701 to 1,100 lb), while females weigh 261 to 283 kg (575 to 624 lb). Male tule elk weigh 204–318 kg (450–701 lb) while females weigh 170–191 kg (375–421 lb). The whole weights of adult male Manitoban elk range from 288 to 478 kilograms (635 to 1,054 lb). Females have a mean weight of 275 kilograms (606 lb). The elk is the second largest extant species of deer, after the moose.

Antlers are made of bone, which can grow at a rate of 2.5 centimeters (0.98 in) per day. While actively growing, a soft layer of highly vascularized skin known as velvet covers and protects them. This is shed in the summer when the antlers have fully developed. Bull elk typically have around six tines on each antler. The Siberian and North American elk carry the largest antlers while the Altai wapiti has the smallest. Roosevelt bull antlers can weigh 18 kg (40 lb). The formation and retention of antlers are testosterone-driven. In late winter and early spring, the testosterone level drops, which causes the antlers to shed.

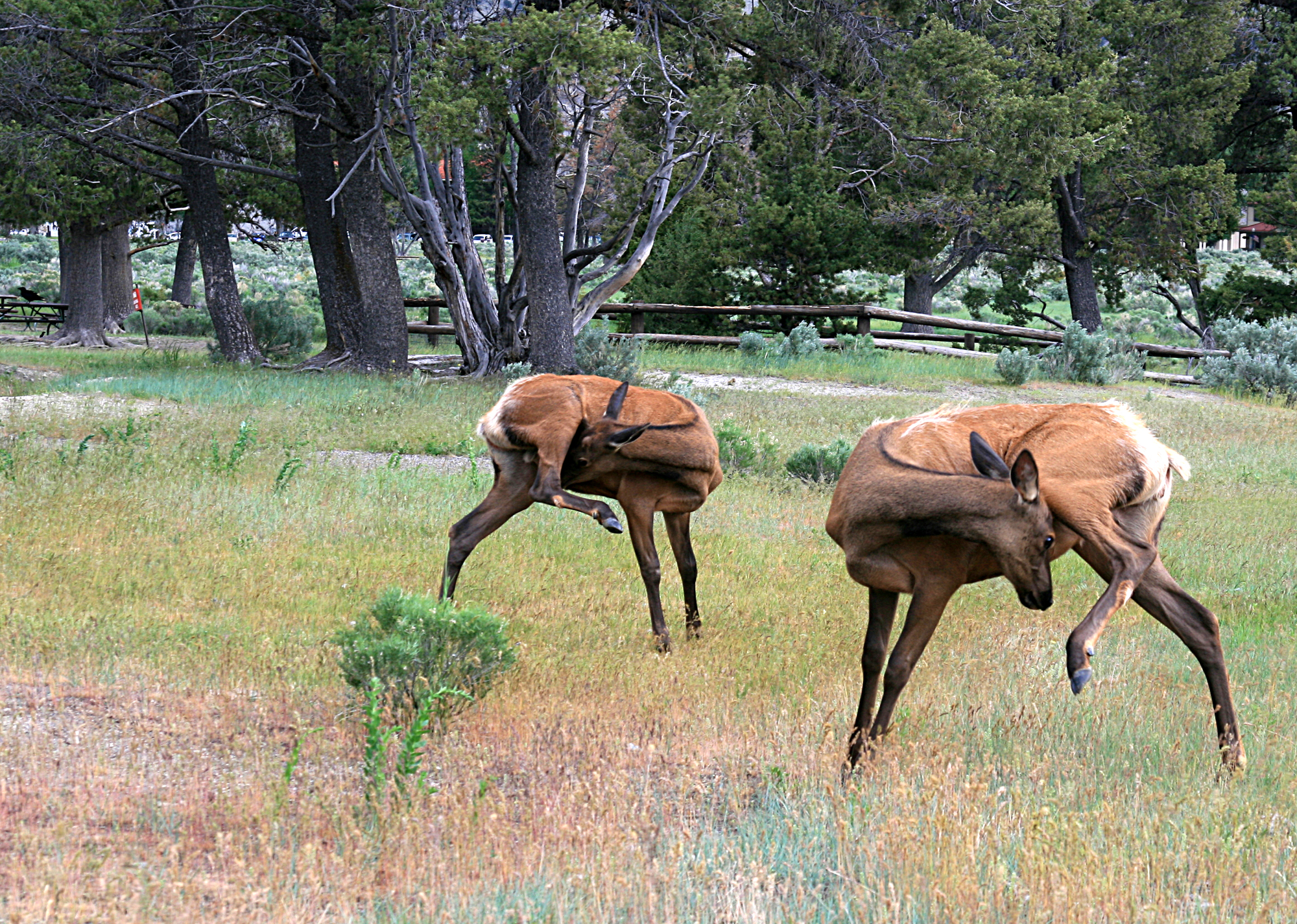
Rocky Mountain elk

During the fall, elk grow a thicker coat of hair, which helps to insulate them during the winter. Both male and female North American elk grow thin neck manes; females of other subspecies may not. By early summer, the heavy winter coat has been shed. Elk are known to rub against trees and other objects to help remove hair from their bodies. All elk have small and clearly defined rump patches with short tails. They have different coloration based on the seasons and types of habitats, with gray or lighter coloration prevalent in the winter and a more reddish, darker coat in the summer. Subspecies living in arid climates tend to have lighter colored coats than do those living in forests. Most have lighter yellow-brown to orange-brown coats in contrast to dark brown hair on the head, neck, and legs during the summer. Forest-adapted Manchurian and Alaskan wapitis have red or reddish-brown coats with less contrast between the body coat and the rest of the body during the summer months. Calves are born spotted, as is common with many deer species, and lose them by the end of summer. Adult Manchurian wapiti may retain a few orange spots on the back of their summer coats until they are older. This characteristic has also been observed in the forest-adapted European red deer.

== Behavior and ecology ==
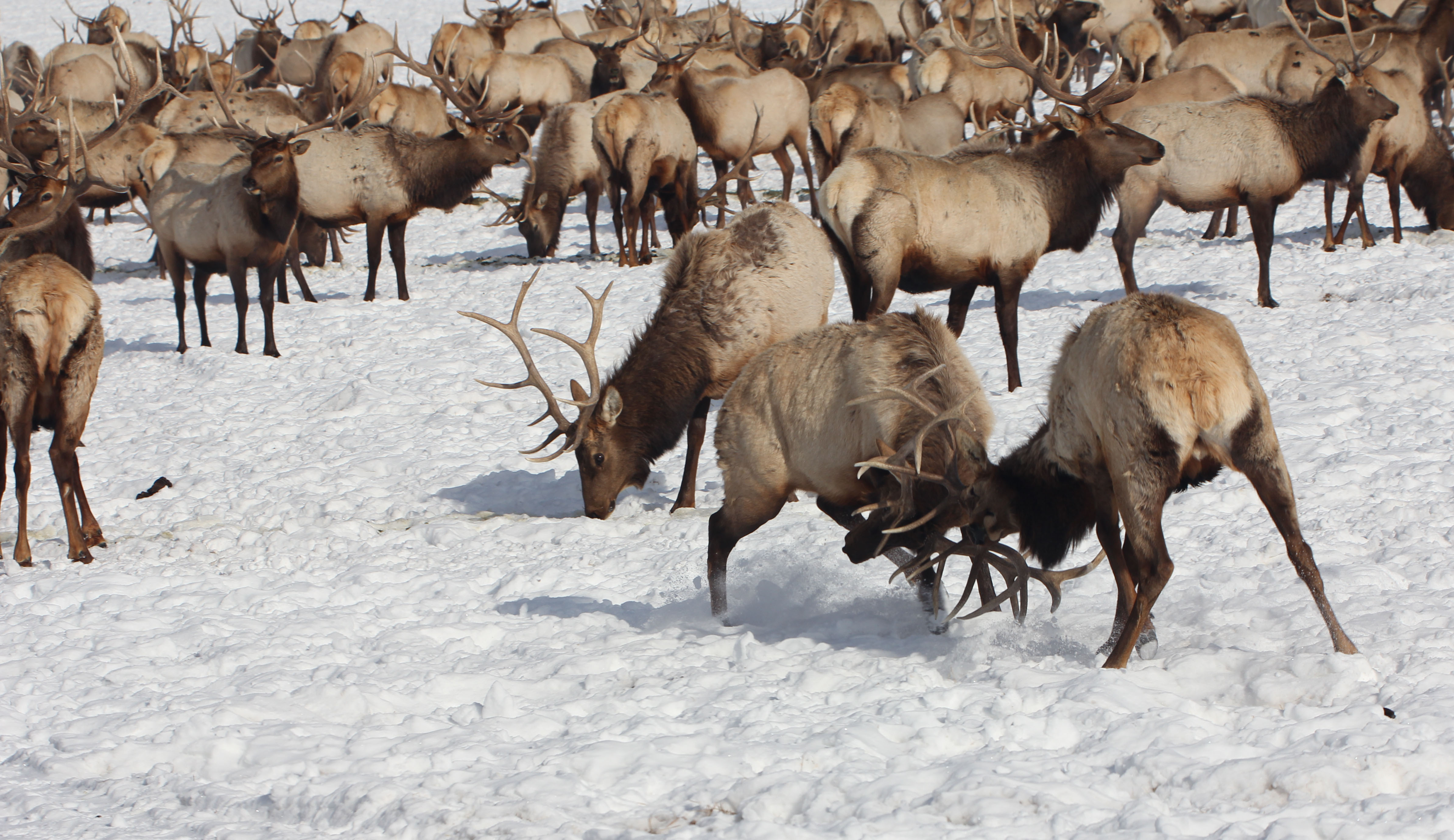
Elk bulls sparring

Elk are among the most gregarious deer species. During the summer group size can reach 400 individuals. For most of the year, adult males and females are segregated into different herds. Female herds are larger while bulls form small groups and may even travel alone. Young bulls may associate with older bulls or female groups. Male and female herds come together during the mating season, which may begin in late August. Males try to intimidate rivals by vocalizing and displaying with their antlers. If neither bull backs down, they engage in antler wrestling, sometimes sustaining serious injuries.

An American elk bugling

Bulls have a loud, high-pitched, whistle-like vocalization known as bugling, which advertise the male's fitness over great distances. Unusual for a vocalization produced by a large animal, buglings can reach a frequency of 4000 Hz. This is achieved by blowing air from the glottis through the nasal cavities. Elk can produce deeper pitched (150 Hz) sounds using the larynx. Cows produce an alarm bark to alert other members of the herd to danger, while calves will produce a high-pitched scream when attacked.

=== Reproduction and life cycle ===
Female elk have a short estrus cycle of only a day or two, and matings usually involve a dozen or more attempts. By the autumn of their second year, females can produce one and, very rarely, two offspring. Reproduction is most common when cows weigh at least 200 kilograms (440 lb). Dominant bulls follow groups of cows during the rut from August into early winter. A bull will defend his harem of 20 cows or more from competing bulls and predators. Bulls also dig holes in the ground called wallows, in which they urinate and roll their bodies. A male elk's urethra points upward so that urine is sprayed almost at a right angle to the penis. The urine soaks into their hair and gives them a distinct smell which attracts cows.

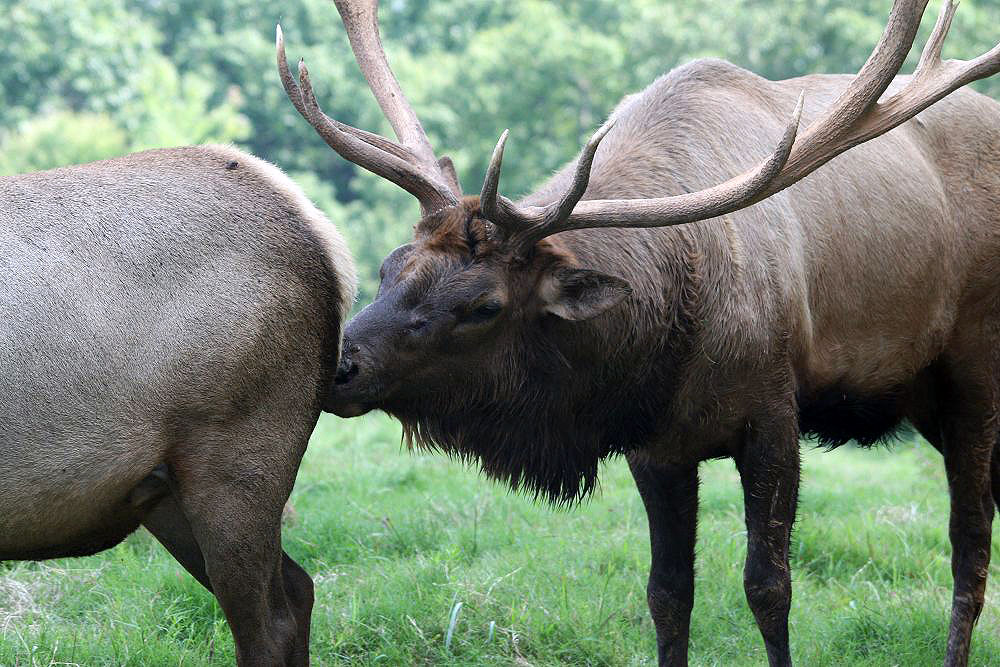
Elk bull inspecting a female

A bull interacts with cows in his harem in two ways: herding and courtship. When a female wanders too far away from the harem's range, the male will rush ahead of her, block her path and aggressively rush her back to the harem. Herding behavior is accompanied by a stretched out and lowered neck and the antlers laid back. A bull may get violent and hit the cow with his antlers. During courtship, the bull is more peaceful and approaches her with his head and antlers raised. The male signals his intention to test the female for sexual receptivity by flicking his tongue. If not ready, a cow will lower her head and weave from side to side while opening and closing her mouth. The bull will stop in response in order not to scare her. Otherwise, the bull will copiously lick the female and then mount her.

Younger, less dominant bulls, known as "spike bulls", because their antlers have not yet forked, will harass unguarded cows. These bulls are impatient and will not perform any courtship rituals and will continue to pursue a female even when she signals him to stop. As such, they are less reproductively successful, and a cow may stay close to the big bull to avoid harassment. Dominant bulls are intolerant of spike bulls and will chase them away from their harems.

The gestation period is eight to nine months and the offspring weigh around 16 kilograms (35 lb). When the females are near to giving birth, they tend to isolate themselves from the main herd, and will remain isolated until the calf is large enough to escape predators. Calves are born spotted, as is common with many deer species, and they lose their spots by the end of summer. After two weeks, calves are able to join the herd, and are fully weaned at two months of age. Elk calves are as large as an adult white-tailed deer by the time they are six months old. Elk will leave their natal (birth) ranges before they are three years old. Males disperse more often than females, as adult cows are more tolerant of female offspring from previous years. Elk live 20 years or more in captivity but average 10 to 13 years in the wild. In some subspecies that suffer less predation, they may live an average of 15 years in the wild.

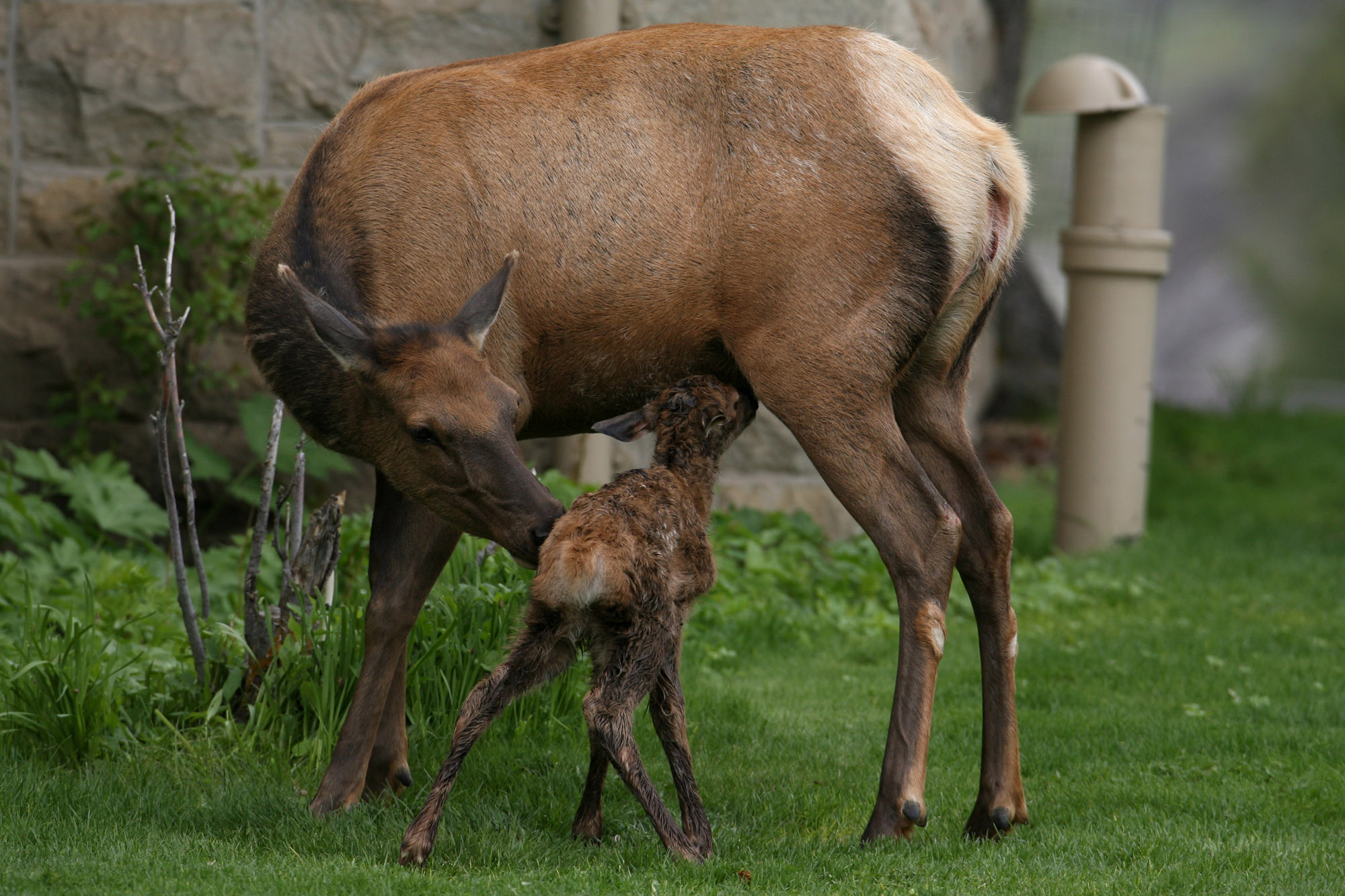
female with newborn calf

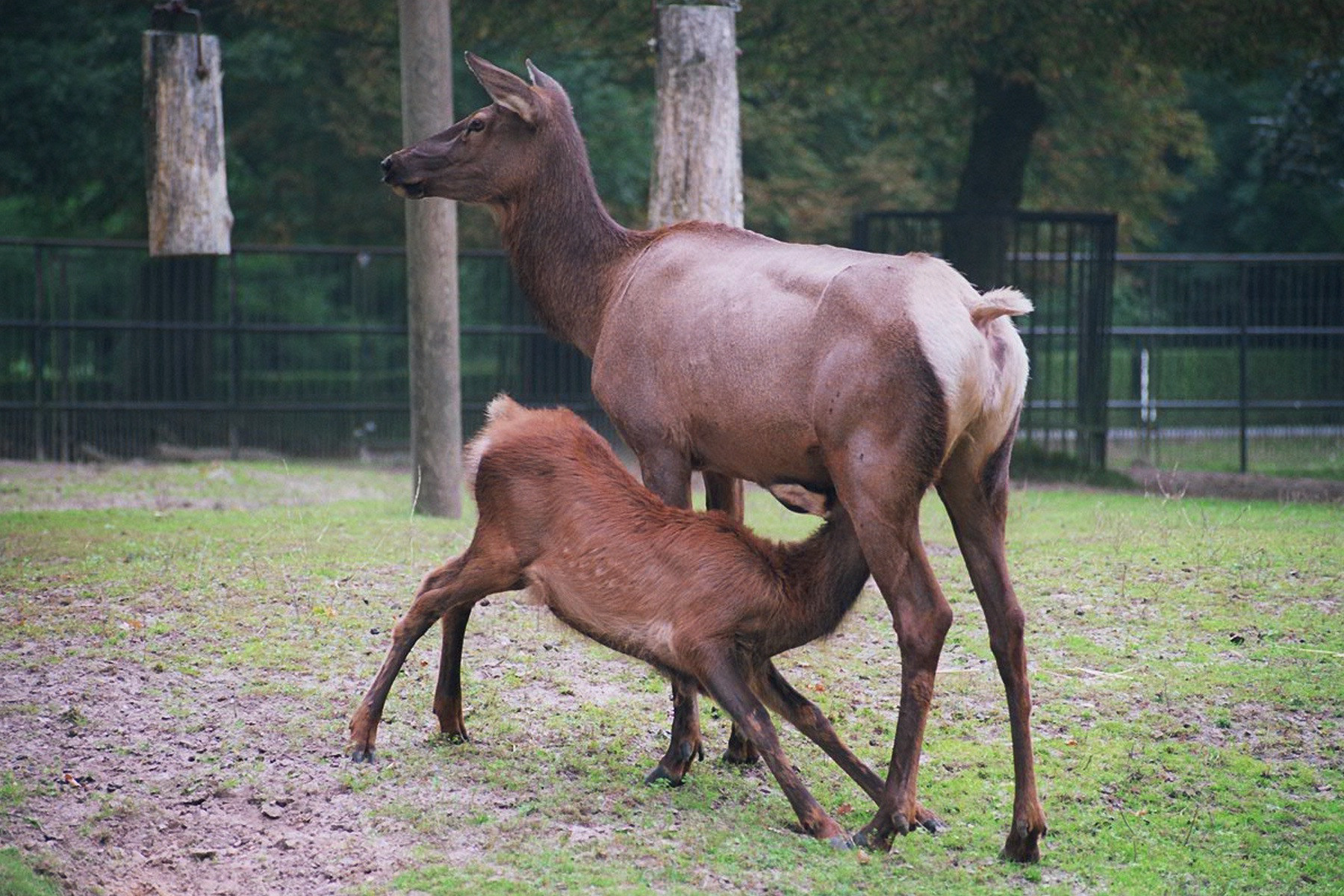
female nursing her calf

juvenile C. c. nelsoni

=== Migration ===
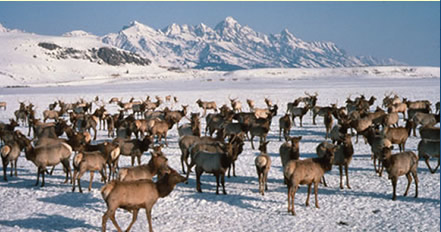
Elk wintering at the National Elk Refuge in Jackson Hole, Wyoming, after migrating there during the fall

As is true for many species of deer, especially those in mountainous regions, elk migrate into areas of higher altitude in the spring, following the retreating snows, and the opposite direction in the fall. Hunting pressure impacts migration and movement. During the winter, they favor wooded areas for the greater availability of food to eat. Elk do not appear to benefit from thermal cover. The Greater Yellowstone Ecosystem elk herds comprise as many as 40,000 individuals. During the spring and fall, they take part in the longest elk migration in the continental U.S., traveling as much as 168 mi (270 km) between summer and winter ranges. The Teton herd consists of between 9,000 and 13,000 elk and they spend winters on the National Elk Refuge, having migrated south from the southern portions of Yellowstone National Park and west from the Shoshone and Bridger–Teton National Forests.

=== Diet ===
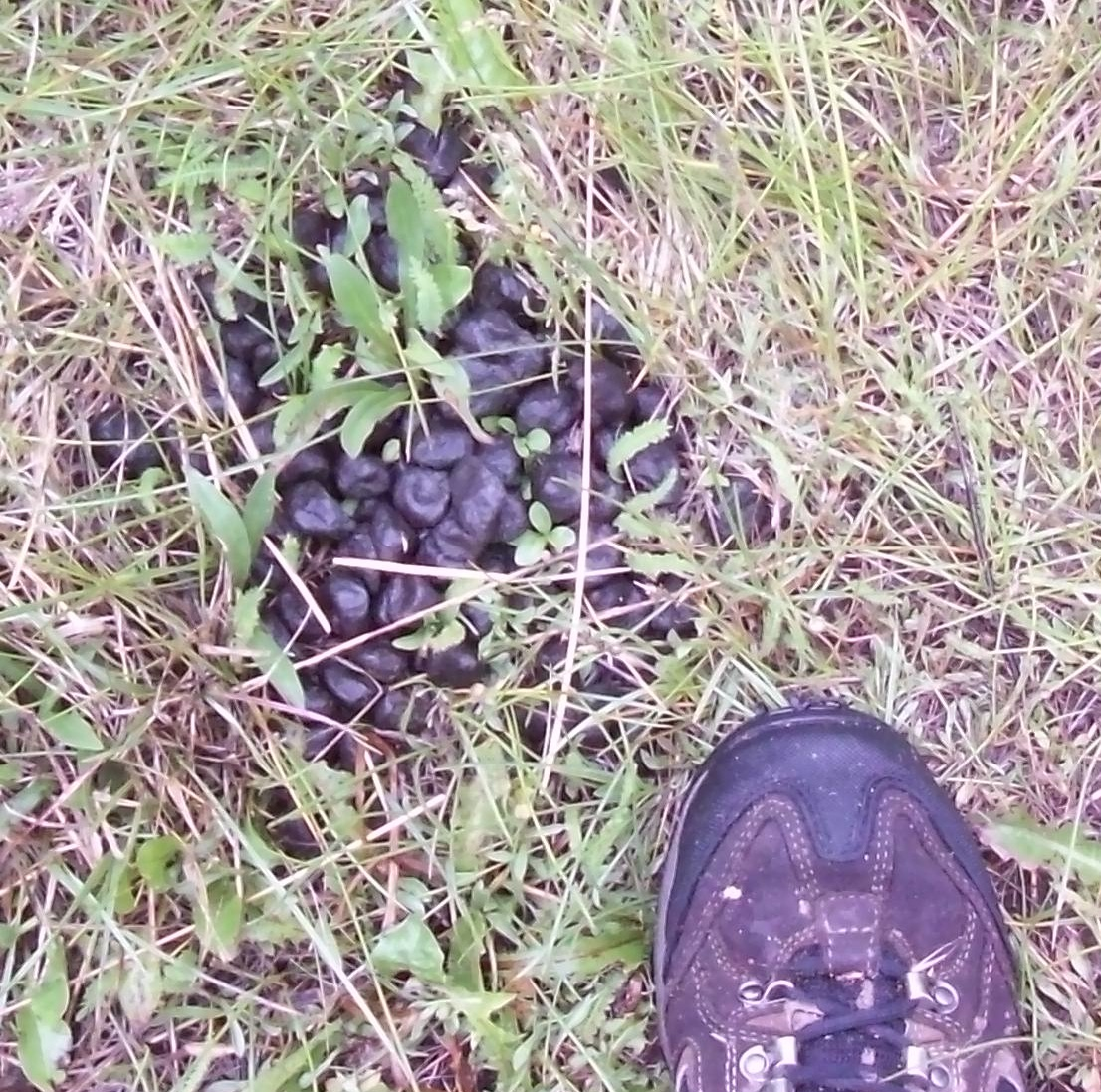
Elk pellet group

Elk are ruminants and therefore have four-chambered stomachs. Unlike white-tailed deer and moose, which are chiefly browsers, elk are similar to cattle in that they are primarily grazers. But like other deer, they also browse. Elk have a tendency to do most of their feeding in the mornings and evenings, seeking sheltered areas in between feedings to digest. Their diets vary somewhat depending on the season, with native grasses being a year-round supplement, tree bark (e.g. cedar, wintergreen, eastern hemlock, sumac, jack pine, red maple, staghorn, and basswood) being consumed in winter, and sedges, forbs, and tree sprouts during the summer. Favorites of the elk include dandelions, aster, hawkweed, violets, clover, and the occasional mushroom. Elk consume an average of 9.1 kilograms (20 lb) of vegetation daily. Particularly fond of aspen sprouts which rise in the spring, elk have had some impact on aspen groves which have been declining in some regions where elk exist. Range and wildlife managers conduct surveys of elk pellet groups to monitor populations and resource use.

Research in the Greater Yellowstone Ecosystem has found that supplemental feeding of concentrated alfalfa pellets leads to significant alterations in the elks' microbiome. The elk gut microbiome is typically characterized by a diverse community of bacteria specialized in breaking down complex plant fibers and cellulose, whereas the supplementally fed gut microbiome may have less fiber-digesting bacteria. Therefore, transitioning from natural foraging to concentrated alfalfa pellets can cause changes in the gut microbiome that might affect the elk's ability to efficiently digest their natural diet or could potentially lead to imbalances that affect overall health.

=== Predators and defensive tactics ===
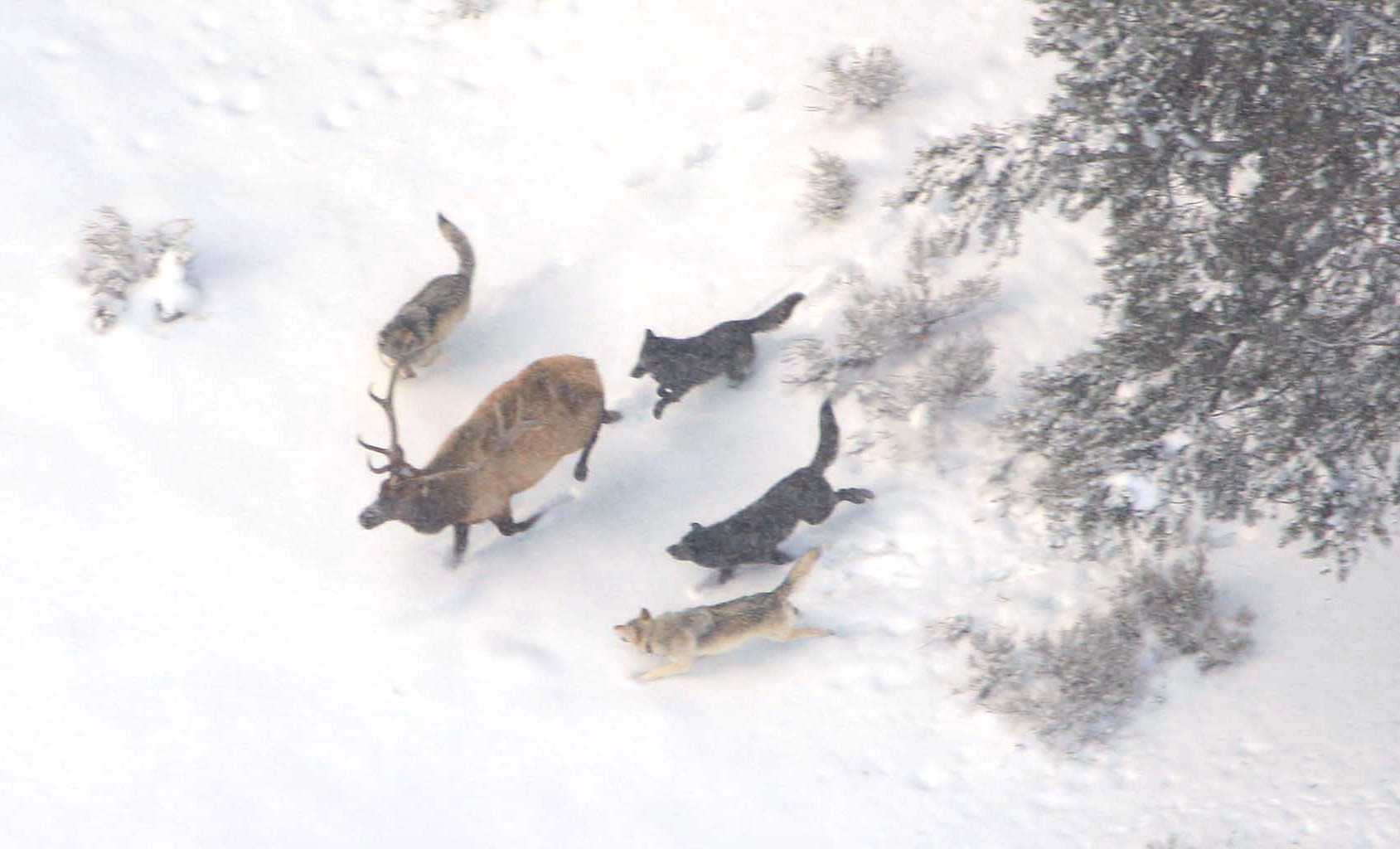
Single bull elk in winter are vulnerable to predation by wolves

Predators of elk include wolves, coyotes, brown and black bears, cougars, and Siberian tigers. Coyote packs mostly prey on elk calves, though they can sometimes take a winter- or disease-weakened adult. In the Greater Yellowstone Ecosystem, which includes Yellowstone National Park, bears are the most significant predators of calves while healthy bulls have never been recorded to be killed by bears and such encounters can be fatal for bears. The killing of cows in their prime is more likely to affect population growth than the killing of bulls or calves.

Elk may avoid predation by switching from grazing to browsing. Grazing puts an elk in the compromising situation of being in an open area with its head down, leaving it unable to see what is going on in the surrounding area. Living in groups also lessens the risk of an individual falling to predation. Large bull elk are less vulnerable and can afford to wander alone, while cows stay in larger groups for protection for their calves. Bulls are more vulnerable to predation by wolves in late winter, after they have been weakened by months of chasing females and fighting. Males that have recently lost their antlers are more likely to be preyed upon.

=== Parasites and disease ===
At least 53 species of protist and animal parasites have been identified in elk. Most of these parasites seldom lead to significant mortality among wild or captive elk. Parelaphostrongylus tenuis (brainworm or meningeal worm) is a parasitic nematode known to affect the spinal cord and brain tissue of elk and other species, leading to death. The definitive host is the white-tailed deer, in which it normally has no ill effects. Snails and slugs, the intermediate hosts, can be inadvertently consumed by elk during grazing. The liver fluke Fascioloides magna and the nematode Dictyocaulus viviparus are also commonly found parasites that can be fatal to elk.

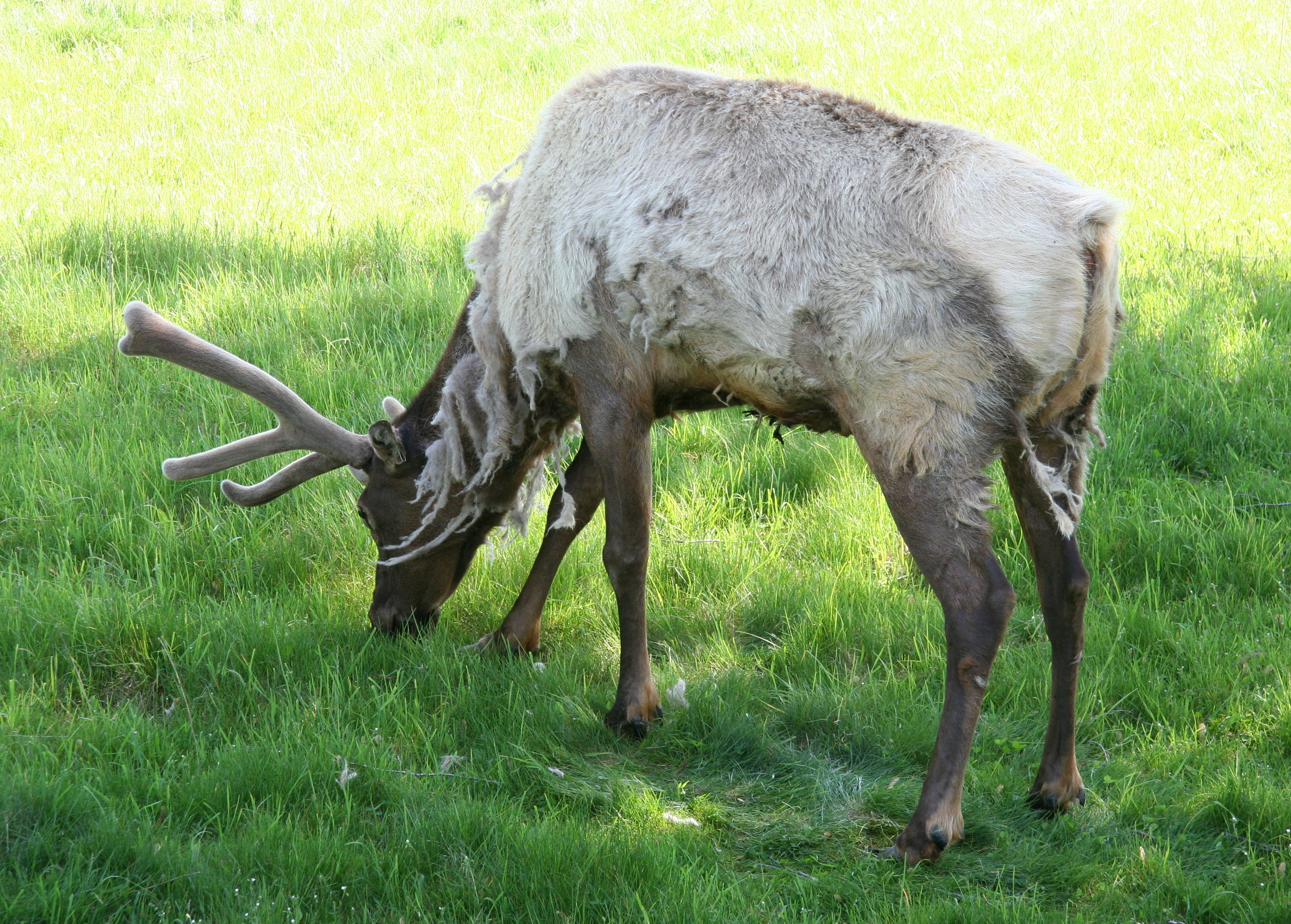
A bull elk in spring, shedding its winter coat and with its antlers covered in velvet

Chronic wasting disease, transmitted by a misfolded protein known as a prion, affects the brain tissue in elk, and has been detected throughout their range in North America. First documented in the late 1960s in mule deer, the disease has affected elk on game farms and in the wild in a number of regions. Elk that have contracted the disease begin to show weight loss, changes in behavior, increased watering needs, excessive salivation and urinating and difficulty swallowing, and at an advanced stage, the disease leads to death. No risks to humans have been documented, nor has the disease been demonstrated to pose a threat to domesticated cattle. In 2002, South Korea banned the importation of elk antler velvet due to concerns about chronic wasting disease.

The Gram-negative bacterial disease brucellosis occasionally affects elk in the Greater Yellowstone Ecosystem, the only place in the U.S. where the disease is still known to exist, though this can extend out to the Bighorn Mountains. In domesticated cattle, brucellosis causes infertility, abortions, and reduced milk production. It is transmitted to humans as undulant fever, producing influenza-like symptoms that may last for years. Though bison are more likely to transmit the disease to other animals, elk inadvertently transmitted brucellosis to horses in Wyoming and cattle in Idaho. Researchers are attempting to eradicate the disease through vaccinations and herd-management measures, which are expected to be successful. Nevertheless, research has been ongoing since 2002, and a successful vaccine has yet to be developed as of 2016.

A recent necropsy study of captive elk in Pennsylvania attributed the cause of death in 33 of 65 cases to either gastrointestinal parasites (21 cases, primarily Eimeria sp. and Ostertagia sp.) or bacterial infections (12 cases, mostly pneumonia).

Elk hoof disease was first noticed in the state of Washington in the late 1990s in the Cowlitz River basin, with sporadic reports of deformed hooves. Since then, the disease has spread rapidly with increased sightings throughout southwest Washington and into Oregon. The disease is characterised by deformed, broken, or missing hooves and leads to severe lameness in elk. The primary cause is not known, but it is associated with treponeme bacteria, which are known to cause digital dermatitis in commercial livestock. The mode of transmission is also not known, but it appears to be highly contagious among elk. Studies are being undertaken by government departments to determine how to halt or eliminate the disease.

== Distribution and status ==
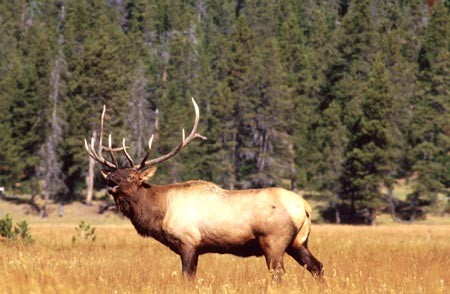
Bull elk bugling during the rut

The elk ranges from central Asia through to Siberia and east Asia and in North America. They can be found in open deciduous woodlands, boreal forests, upland moors, mountainous areas and grasslands. The International Union for Conservation of Nature and Natural Resources (IUCN) list the species as least-concern species. The habitat of Siberian elk in Asia is similar to that of the Rocky Mountain subspecies in North America. During the Late Pleistocene their range was much more extensive, being distributed across Eurasia, with remains being found as far west as France. These populations are most closely related to modern Asian populations of the elk. Their range collapsed at the start of the Holocene, possibly because they were specialized to cold periglacial tundra-steppe habitat. When this environment was replaced largely by closed forest the red deer might have outcompeted the elk. Relictual populations survived into the early Holocene (until around 3000 years ago) in southern Sweden and the Alps, where the environment remained favorable. Elk were also present in the early Holocene of central Alaska, where it was the main hunted animal along with bison, and survived in Yukon until around 1400 BP (550 AD).

=== Introductions and reintroductions ===
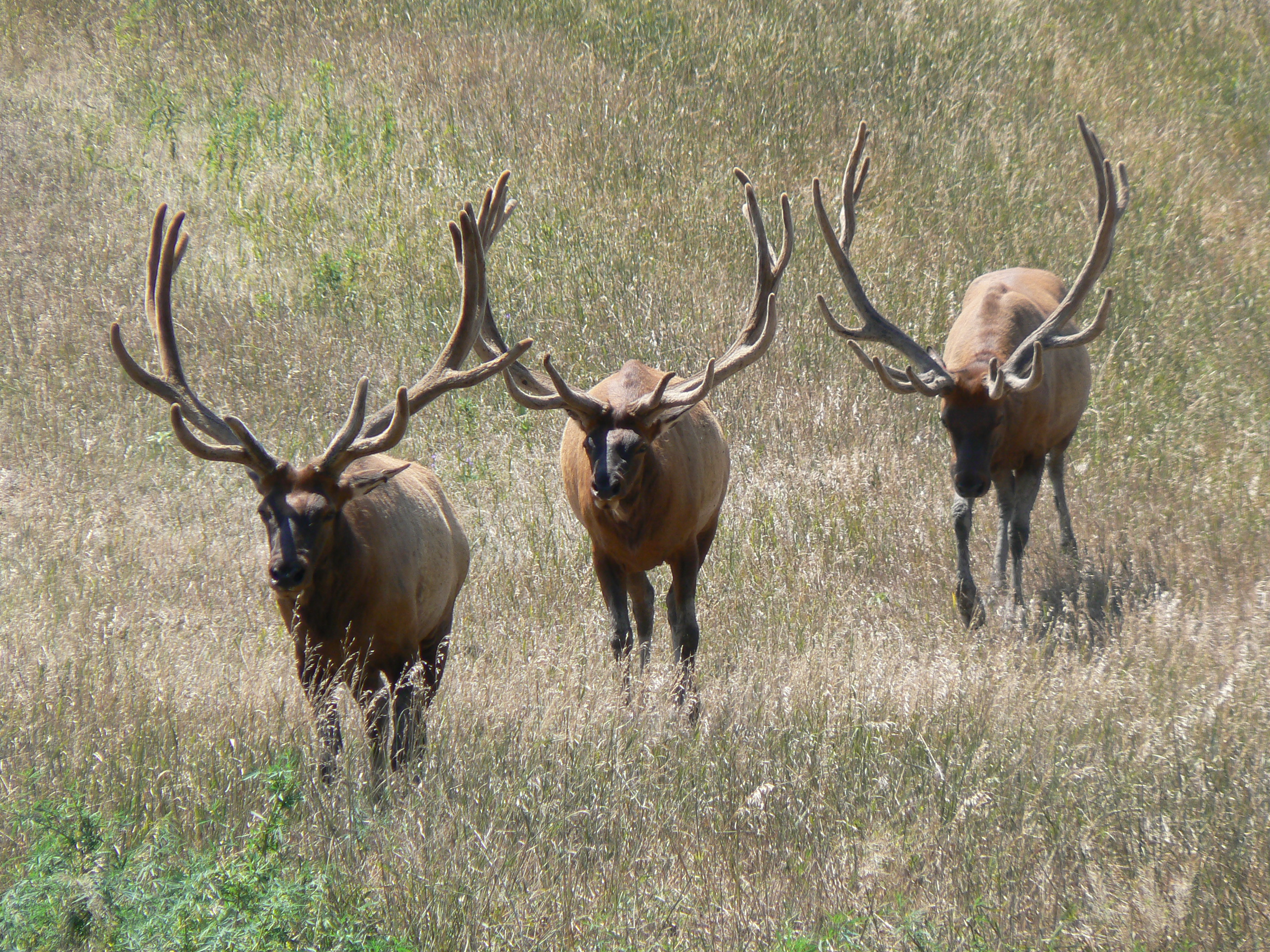
Bull elk on a captive range in Nebraska. These elk, originally from Rocky Mountain herds, exhibit modified behavior due to having been held in captivity, under less selective pressure

As of 2014, population figures for all North American elk subspecies were around one million. Prior to the European colonization of North America, there were an estimated 10 million on the continent.

There are many past and ongoing examples of reintroduction into areas of the US. Elk were reintroduced in Michigan in 1918 after extirpation there in 1875. The Rocky Mountain elk subspecies was reintroduced by hunter-conservation organizations into the Appalachian region of the U.S. where the now extinct eastern elk once lived. They were reintroduced to Pennsylvania beginning in 1913 and throughout the mid-20th Century, and now remain at a stable population of approximately 1,400 individuals. Since the late 1990s, they were reintroduced and recolonized in the states of Wisconsin, Kentucky, North Carolina, Tennessee, Georgia, Virginia and West Virginia. In the state of Kentucky, the elk population in 2022 had increased to over 15,000 animals. In 2016, a male elk, likely from the Smoky Mountains population in western North Carolina, was sighted in South Carolina for the first time in nearly 300 years. Once locally extinct, dispersing elk are now regularly spotted in Iowa, although a wild population has not yet established. Since 2015, elk have also been reintroduced in a number of other states, including Missouri, and introduced to the islands of Etolin and Afognak in Alaska. Reintroduction of the elk into Ontario began in the early 20th century and is ongoing with limited success.

Elk and red deer were introduced to Argentina in the early 20th century. There they are now considered an invasive species, encroaching on Argentinian ecosystems where they compete for food with the indigenous Chilean huemul and other herbivores. This negative impact on native animal species has led the IUCN to identify the elk as one of the world's 100 worst invaders.

The introduction of deer to New Zealand began in the middle of the 19th century, and current populations are primarily European red deer, with only 15 percent being elk. In 1905 18 American wapiti were released in George Sound in the Fiordland National Park. In 1949 the New Zealand American Fiordland Expedition was undertaken to study the descendants of this release. There is significant hybridization of elk with red deer. These deer have had an adverse impact on forest regeneration of some plant species, as they consume more palatable species, which are replaced with those that are less favored by the elk. The long-term impact will be an alteration of the types of plants and trees found, and in other animal and plant species dependent upon them. As in Chile and Argentina, the IUCN has declared that red deer and elk populations in New Zealand are an invasive species.

=== U.S. states by estimated elk population ===
State	Estimated Number of Elk
Colorado	280,000
Montana	141,785
Oregon	133,000
Idaho	120,000
Wyoming	110,200
Utah	81,000
New Mexico	70,000 – 90,000
Washington	60,000
Arizona	35,000
Kentucky	15,876
California	12,500
Nevada	12,500
South Dakota	6,000
Oklahoma	5,000
Texas	1,600
Pennsylvania	1,400
Michigan	1,196
North Dakota	700
Arkansas	450
Tennessee	400
Wisconsin	400
Virginia	250
Missouri	200
Kansas	175 – 350
North Carolina	150 – 200
West Virginia	140 – 150
Minnesota	126

== Cultural references ==
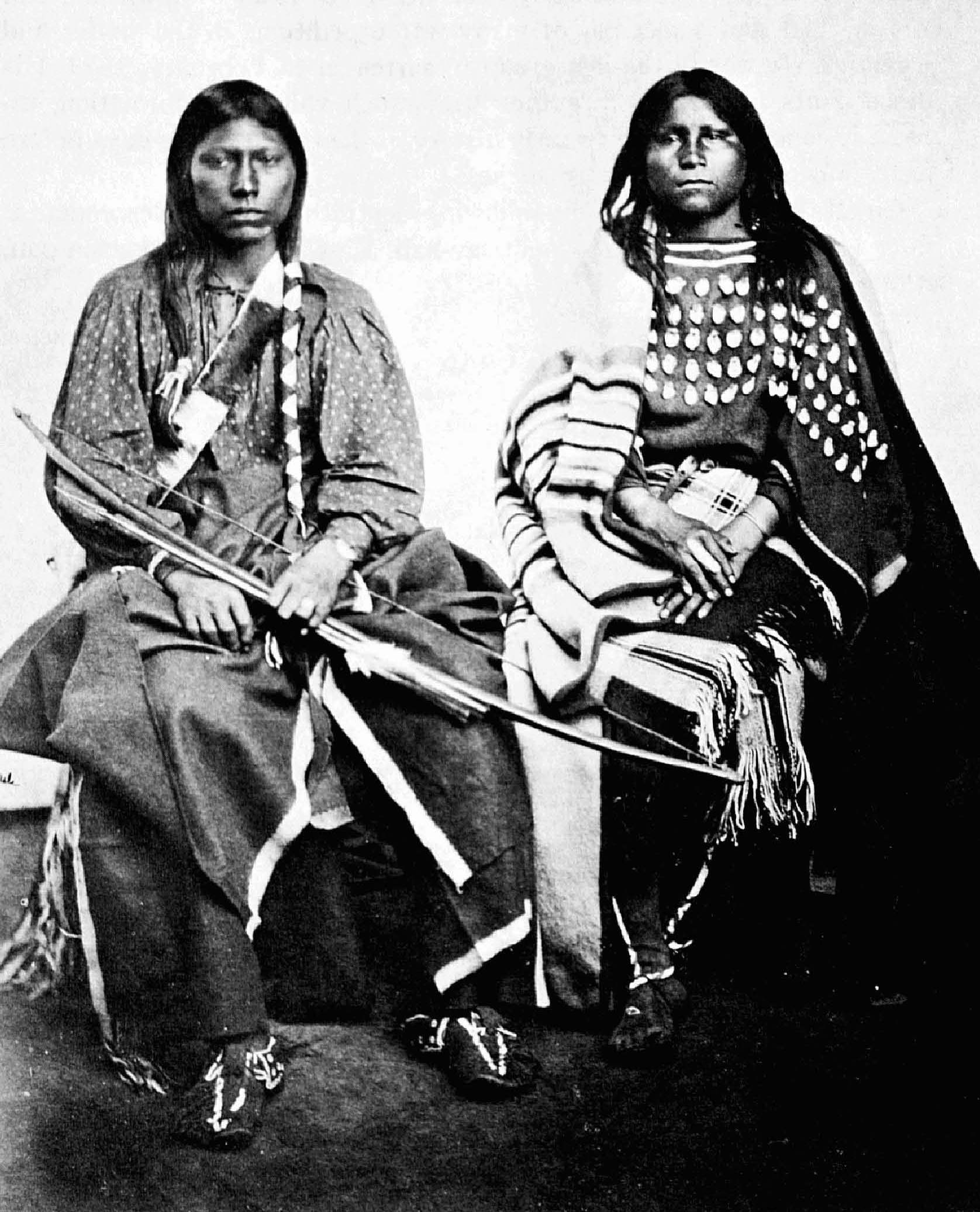
A Kiowa couple. The woman on the right is wearing an elk tooth dress.

Elk have played an important role in the cultural history of a number of peoples. Neolithic petroglyphs from Asia depict antler-less female elk, which have been interpreted as symbolizing life and sustenance. They were also frequently overlaid with boats and associated with rivers, suggesting they also represented paths to the underworld. Petroglyphs of elk were carved into cliffs by the Ancestral Puebloans of the southwestern U.S. hundreds of years ago. The elk was of particular importance to the Lakota and played a spiritual role in their society. The male elk was admired for its ability to attract mates, and Lakota men will play a courting flute imitating a bugling elk to attract women. Men used elks' antlers as love charms and wore clothes decorated with elk images.

The Rocky Mountain elk is the official state animal of Utah. An image of an elk and a moose appear on the state seal and flag of Michigan. The Benevolent and Protective Order of Elks (B.P.O.E.) chose the elk as its namesake because a number of its attributes seemed appropriate for cultivation by members of the fraternity. Jewel-encrusted, gold-mounted elk teeth are prized possessions of many members of the B.P.O.E.

== Commercial uses ==
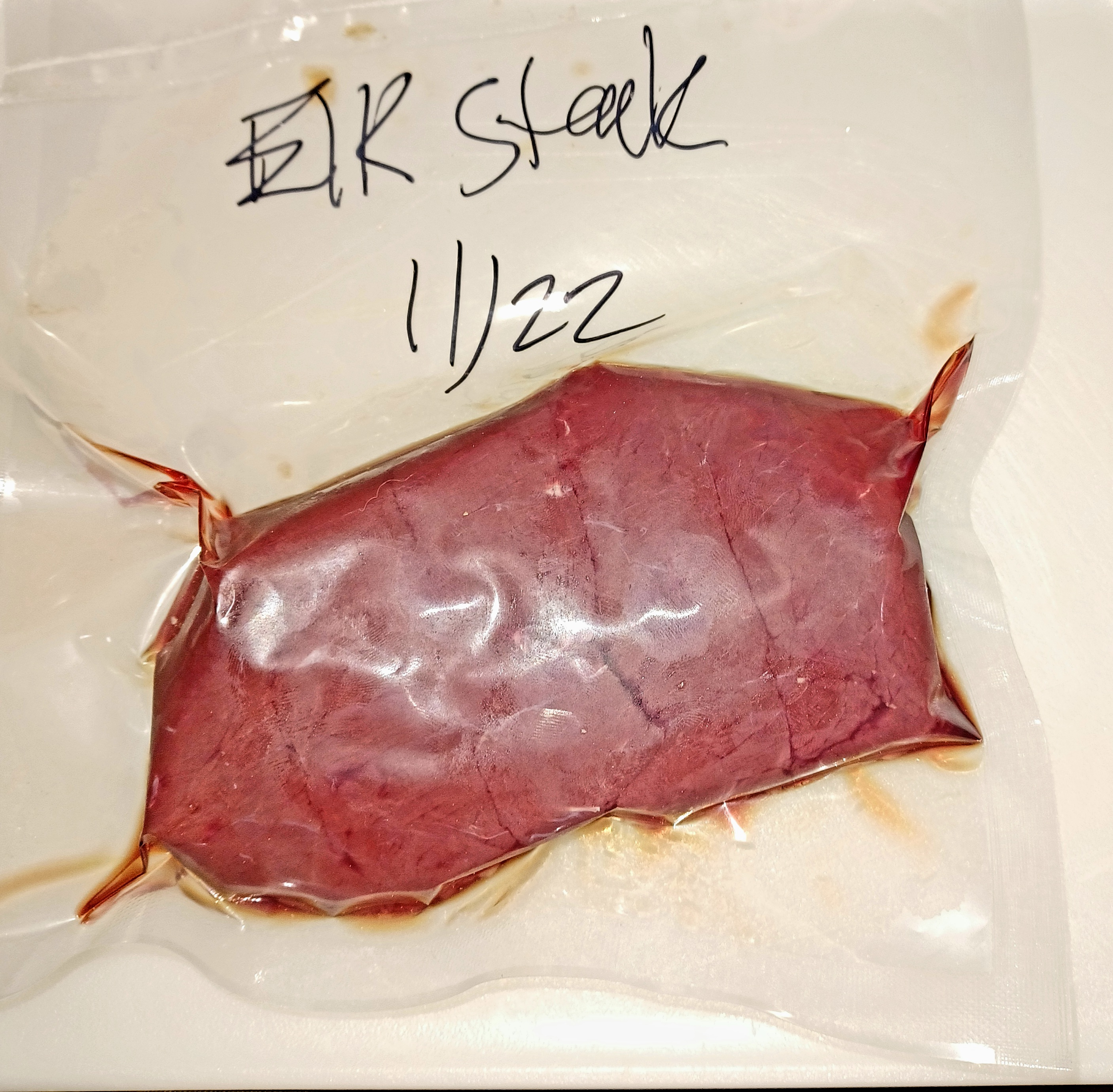
A cut of elk meat, showing the low fat content

Although the 2006 National Survey from the U.S. Fish and Wildlife Service does not provide breakdown figures for each game species, hunting of wild elk is most likely the primary economic impact.

While elk are not generally harvested for meat production on a large scale, some restaurants offer the meat as a specialty item, and it is also available in some grocery stores. The meat is higher in protein and lower in fat and cholesterol than beef, pork, and chicken. Elk meat is a good source of iron, phosphorus and zinc.

A male elk can produce 10 to 11 kilograms (22 to 24 lb) of antler velvet annually and on ranches in the United States, Canada and New Zealand, it is collected and sold to markets in East Asia, where it is used in medicine. Some cultures consider antler velvet to be an aphrodisiac. However, consuming velvet from elk in North America may be risky since velvet from animals infected with chronic wasting disease may contain prions that could result in a human getting variant Creutzfeldt–Jakob disease.

Antlers are also used in artwork, furniture and other novelty items. All Asian subspecies, along with other deer, have been raised for their antlers in central and eastern Asia by Han Chinese, Turkic peoples, Tungusic peoples, Mongolians, and Koreans. Elk farms are relatively common in North America and New Zealand. Native Americans have used elk hides for tepee covering, clothing and footwear.

Since 1967, the Boy Scouts of America have assisted employees at the National Elk Refuge in Wyoming by collecting the antlers which are shed each winter. They are then auctioned, with 80% of the proceeds returned to the refuge. In 2010, 2,520 kilograms (5,560 lb) of antlers were auctioned, which brought in over $46,000.
