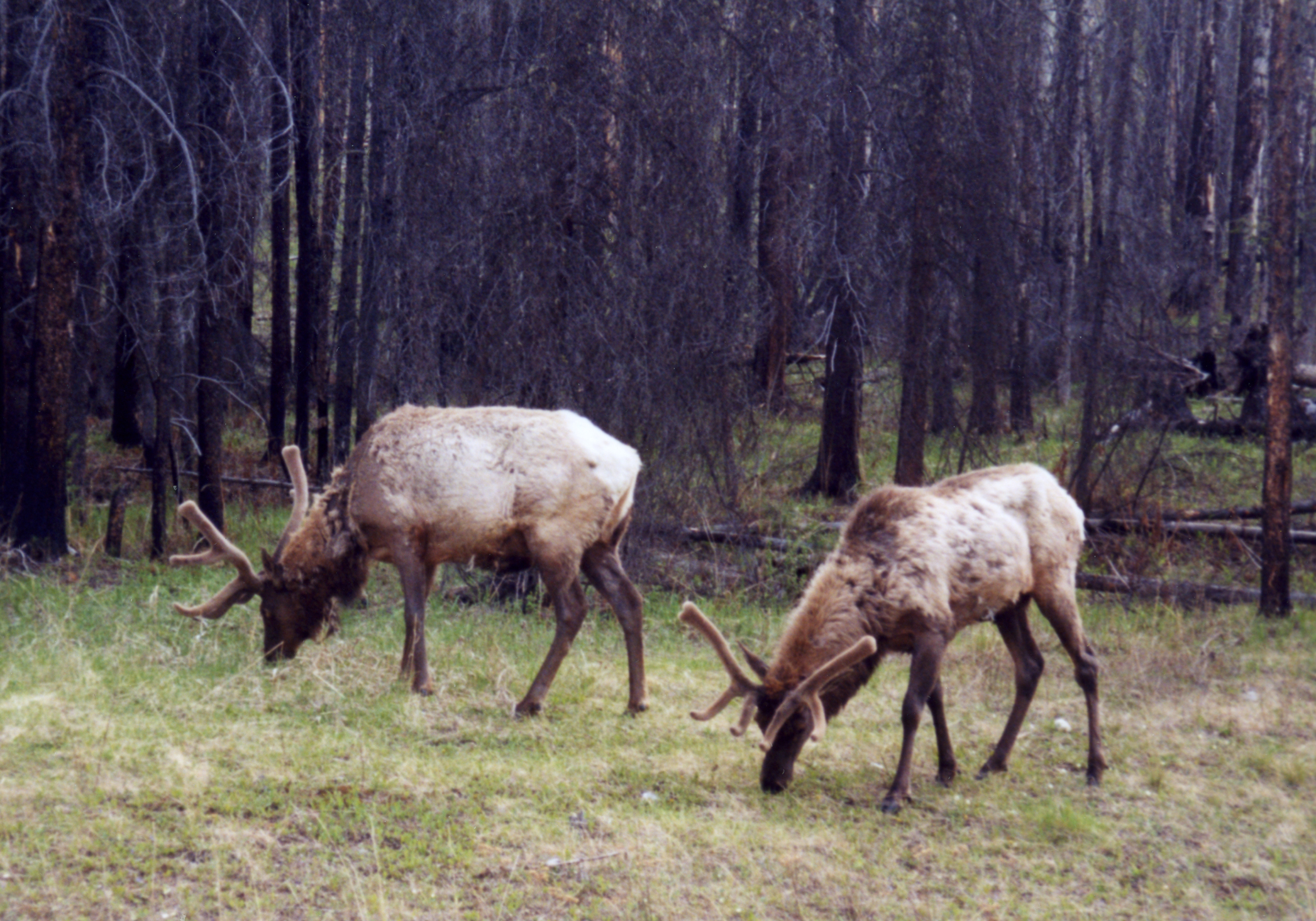

Conservation status
- Least Concern (IUCN 3.1)

Scientific classification
- Kingdom: Animalia
- Phylum: Chordata
- Class: Mammalia
- Order: Artiodactyla
- Family: Cervidae
- Genus: Cervus
- Species: C. canadensis
- Subspecies: C. c. manitobensis

Trinomial name
- Cervus canadensis manitobensis (Erxleben, 1777)

= Manitoban elk =

Subspecies of deer

The Manitoban elk (Cervus canadensis manitobensis) is a subspecies of elk found in the Midwestern United States (specifically North Dakota) and southern regions of the Canadian Prairies (specifically Manitoba, Saskatchewan, and north-central Alberta). In 2001–2002, a breeding population of 52 Manitoban elk was also introduced into the Cataloochee valley of the Great Smoky Mountains National Park in North Carolina to replace a population of Eastern elk which had gone extinct over 100 years prior. As of 2021, the population has grown to 150-200 individuals and has expanded their range outside of their initial protected region. In 2016, one of the elk from the North Carolina herd was spotted in South Carolina, the first time an elk had been seen in that state since the late 1700s.

Compared to the Rocky Mountain elk, it is larger in body size, but has smaller antlers. The subspecies was driven into near extinction by 1900, but has recovered since then.

The Manitoban elk's primary predator is the grey wolf. Because the elk is a non-migratory species, it cannot rely on long-distance migration to reduce the risk of predation, and therefore uses a combination of behavioral patterns, such as aggregation, movement, and vigilance, to avoid predation.

== Weight ==
The study of Blood and Lovaas (1966) gave the whole weights of 19 Manitoban Elk collected in Riding Mountain National Park, Manitoba. Of these, 8 were adult males and 4 were adult females. The adults males ranged in weight from 634 lbs or 287,5 kg [a 3 years 1 month old bull killed in June] to 1053 lbs or 477,6 kg [a 8 years 7 months old bull killed in December]. The mean weights of these 8 adult males was 777 lbs or 352,4 kg. However, the inclusion of the exceptionally large bull and the small sample size make this referential weight data less representative than with a bigger sample (see : Sample size determination for more details). For instance, the second largest bull measured was 165 lbs or 74,8 kg lighter than the heaviest. The 4 adult females weighed in the study had a mean weight of 606 lbs or 274,8 kg.

== See also ==
- Red deer
