= Merriam's elk =

Conservation status
- Extinct (1906) (IUCN 3.1)

- Presumed Extinct (NatureServe)

Scientific classification
- Kingdom: Animalia
- Phylum: Chordata
- Class: Mammalia
- Order: Artiodactyla
- Family: Cervidae
- Genus: Cervus
- Species: C. canadensis
- Subspecies: †C. c. merriami

Trinomial name
- †Cervus canadensis merriami (Erxleben, 1777)

Synonyms
- Cervus elaphus merriami

Extinct subspecies of deer

The Merriam's elk (Cervus canadensis merriami) is an extinct subspecies or population of elk once found in the arid lands of the southwestern United States (in Arizona, New Mexico and Texas), as well as in Mexico. The taxonomic validity of this subspecies is disputed.

== Taxonomy ==
Merriam's elk was first described in 1902 by Edward William Nelson using a small number of museum specimens. It was originally classified as its own species, Cervus merriami. Nelson reported that compared to Rocky Mountain elk (Cervus canadensis nelsoni), Merriam's elk had a darker nose and a more reddish head and legs, as well as a larger head, among other notable anatomic features. However, in the mid Twentieth Century, morphological analyses of remaining specimens assigned to Merriam's elk determined that these specimens fell within the parameters of individual variation of Rocky Mountain elk specimens. This led to the reclassification of Merriam's elk as a subspecies of C. canadensis (C. c. merriami, historically called C. elaphus merriami).

Several genetic studies of elk across North America have found no discernible difference between the DNA markers of Merriam's elk specimens and Rocky Mountain elk, leading many researchers to conclude that Merriam's elk is not a valid subspecies, and instead represents a historically southern population of Rocky Mountain elk (C. canadensis).

In 2017, the International Union for Conservation of Nature (IUCN) reclassified all North American elk subspecies, excluding the Tule elk and Roosevelt elk, as C. c. canadensis. This taxonomic ruling means that Merriam's elk is not an extinct species or subspecies, but rather a population of Rocky Mountain elk that was extirpated (locally extinct) or depleted from large swathes of its former home range.

== Extinction ==
From the first New World arrival of Europeans, unregulated hunting, rapid growth of farms and ranches, and uncontrolled livestock grazing had driven the subspecies into extinction. Actual records on wildlife management were not reliably maintained until the late 19th century; the population of Merriam's elk was experiencing notable decline by the beginning of the 20th century, with the approximate year of extinction being 1906. Another subspecies of elk, the eastern elk (Cervus canadensis canadensis), also became extinct at roughly the same time.

== See also ==
- List of extinct animals of North America
