= Kansu red deer =

Scientific classification
- Kingdom: Animalia
- Phylum: Chordata
- Class: Mammalia
- Order: Artiodactyla
- Family: Cervidae
- Genus: Cervus
- Species: C. canadensis
- Subspecies: C. c. kansuensis

Trinomial name
- Cervus canadensis kansuensis (Pocock, 1912)

Subspecies of deer

The Kansu red deer (Cervus canadensis kansuensis) is a subspecies of wapiti found in the Gansu province of China. This subspecies forms, along with the closely related Sichuan deer, and Tibetan red deer, the southernmost wapiti group.
