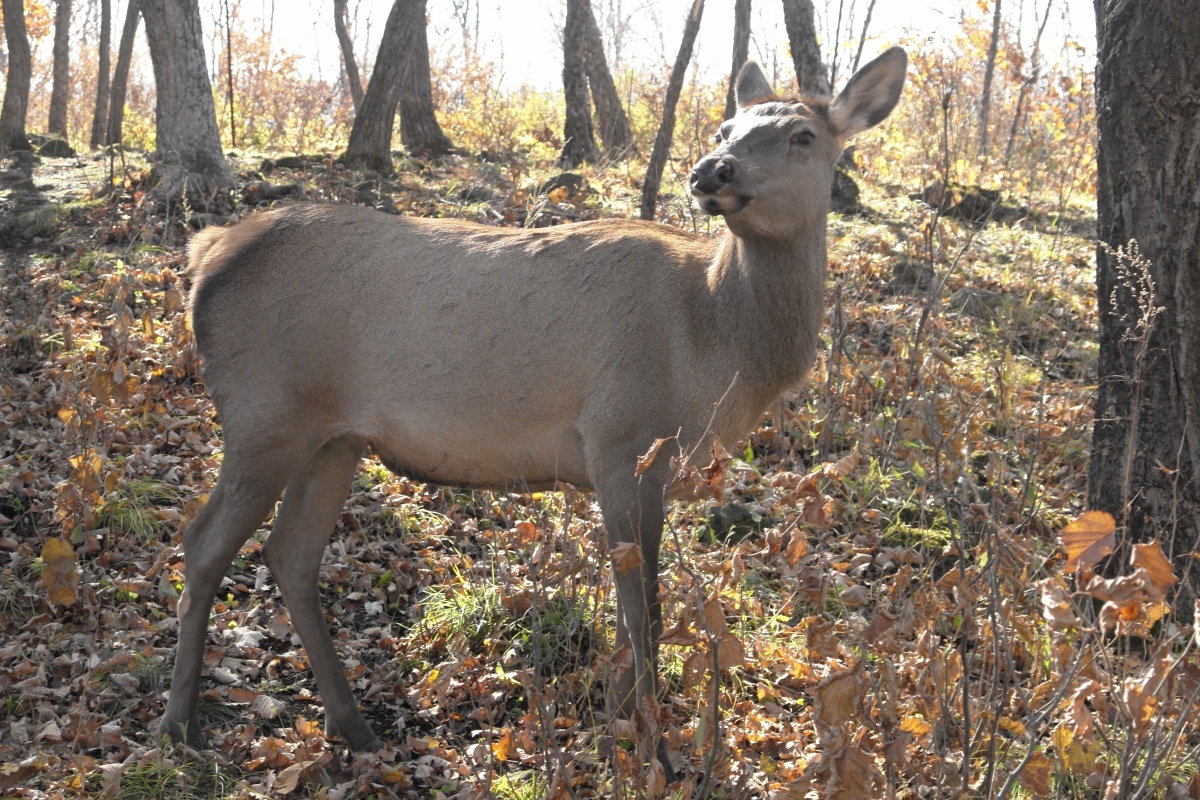

Scientific classification
- Kingdom: Animalia
- Phylum: Chordata
- Class: Mammalia
- Order: Artiodactyla
- Family: Cervidae
- Genus: Cervus
- Species: C. canadensis
- Subspecies: C. c. xanthopygus

Trinomial name
- Cervus canadensis xanthopygus (H. Milne-Edwards, 1867)

= Manchurian wapiti =

Subspecies of deer

The Manchurian wapiti (Cervus canadensis xanthopygus) is a putative subspecies of the wapiti native to East Asia. It may be identified as its own species, Cervus xanthopygus.

== Description ==
The Manchurian wapiti's coat is reddish brown during summer, and brownish gray in winter. It has dark hairs on the neck and dark underparts, followed by a light-colored rump patch. It is smaller than Altai wapiti (Cervus canadensis sibiricus) with smaller and stouter antlers.

Male deer are wapiti-like with a neck mane, and as mentioned, relatively small wapiti-like antlers. Female deer are more red deer-like and lack neck manes. This deer is the most red deer-like of the wapiti, being adapted to mixed deciduous forest environments in Manchuria, Yakutia, Northern China, Eastern Mongolia, and North Korea. Like many wapiti, adult deer may have some visible spots in their summer coats.

In the Manchurian Mountains cows weigh 150-180 kg and bulls weigh 200-250 kg, and bulls attain measurements of 1.5 m in height and 2.4 m in length. Manchurian wapiti are considered the smallest among the other elks, in other parts of Manchuria they may have larger sizes.

== Range ==
This deer is found in southeastern Siberia (to the east of Lake Baikal), northeastern Mongolia, Manchuria, North Korea and northeastern China. Similar forms from Alxa, Gansu, Shanxi and southern Mongolia were originally described as a distinct subspecies, the Alashan wapiti (Cervus canadensis alashanicus). However, a genetic research in 2004 indicates that this deer belongs to the Manchurian subspecies. However, due to the insufficient genetic material that rejects monophyly of C. canadensis, the 2006 study considered it premature to include the Manchurian wapiti as a true subspecies of wapiti, and that it likely needs to be elevated to its own species, C. xanthopygus.
