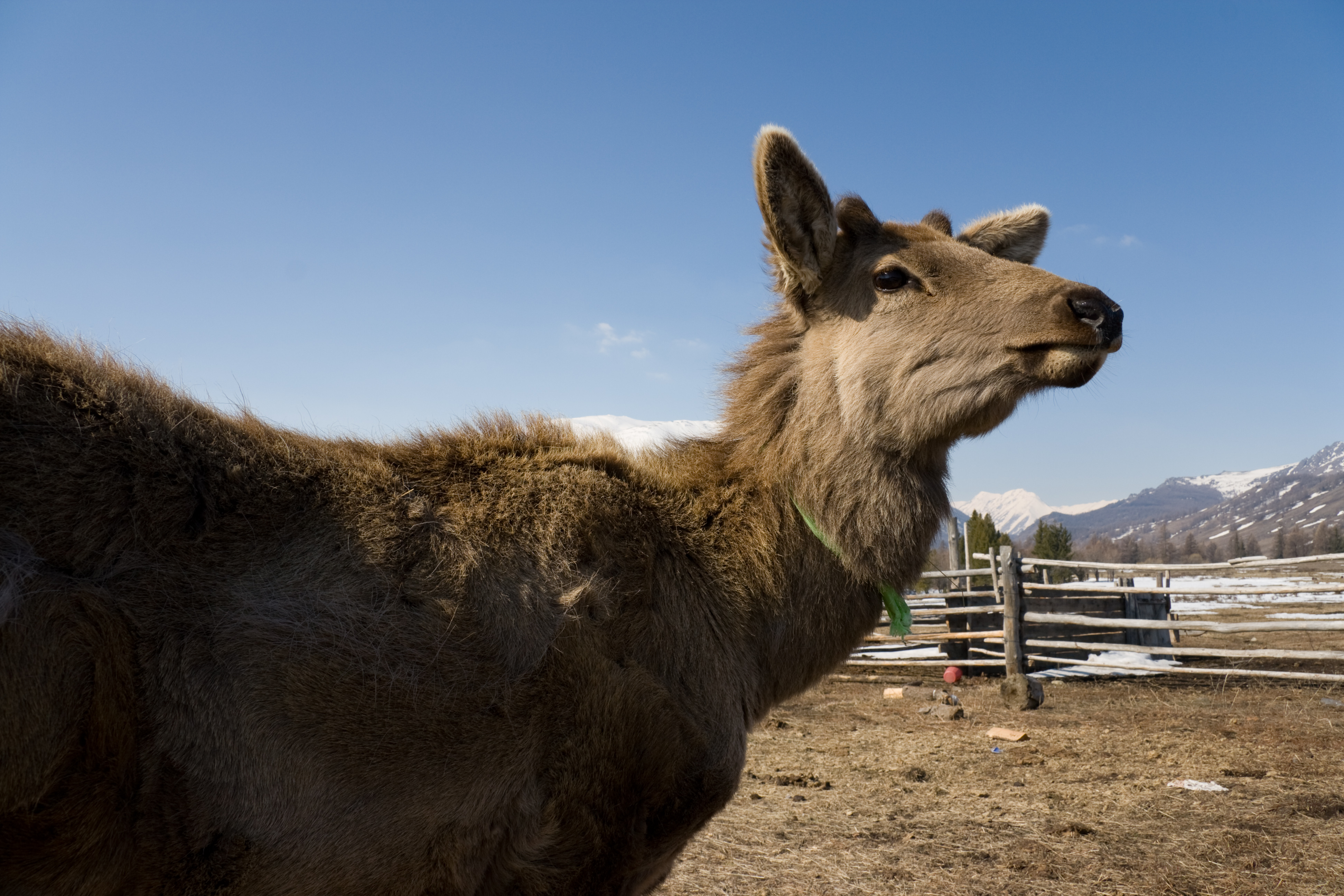

Scientific classification
- Kingdom: Animalia
- Phylum: Chordata
- Class: Mammalia
- Order: Artiodactyla
- Family: Cervidae
- Genus: Cervus
- Species: C. canadensis
- Subspecies: C. c. sibiricus

Trinomial name
- Cervus canadensis sibiricus (Erxleben, 1777)

= Altai wapiti =

Subspecies of deer

The Altai wapiti, sometimes called the Altai elk, or simply the Altai deer, is a subspecies of Cervus canadensis found in the forest hills of southern Siberia, northwestern Mongolia, and northern Xinjiang province of China. It is different from the Tian Shan wapiti in being smaller and paler in color.

It has also been classified as C. elaphus sibirica, and is also known as the Altai maral, central maral deer, Siberian red deer, and maral.

== Characteristics ==
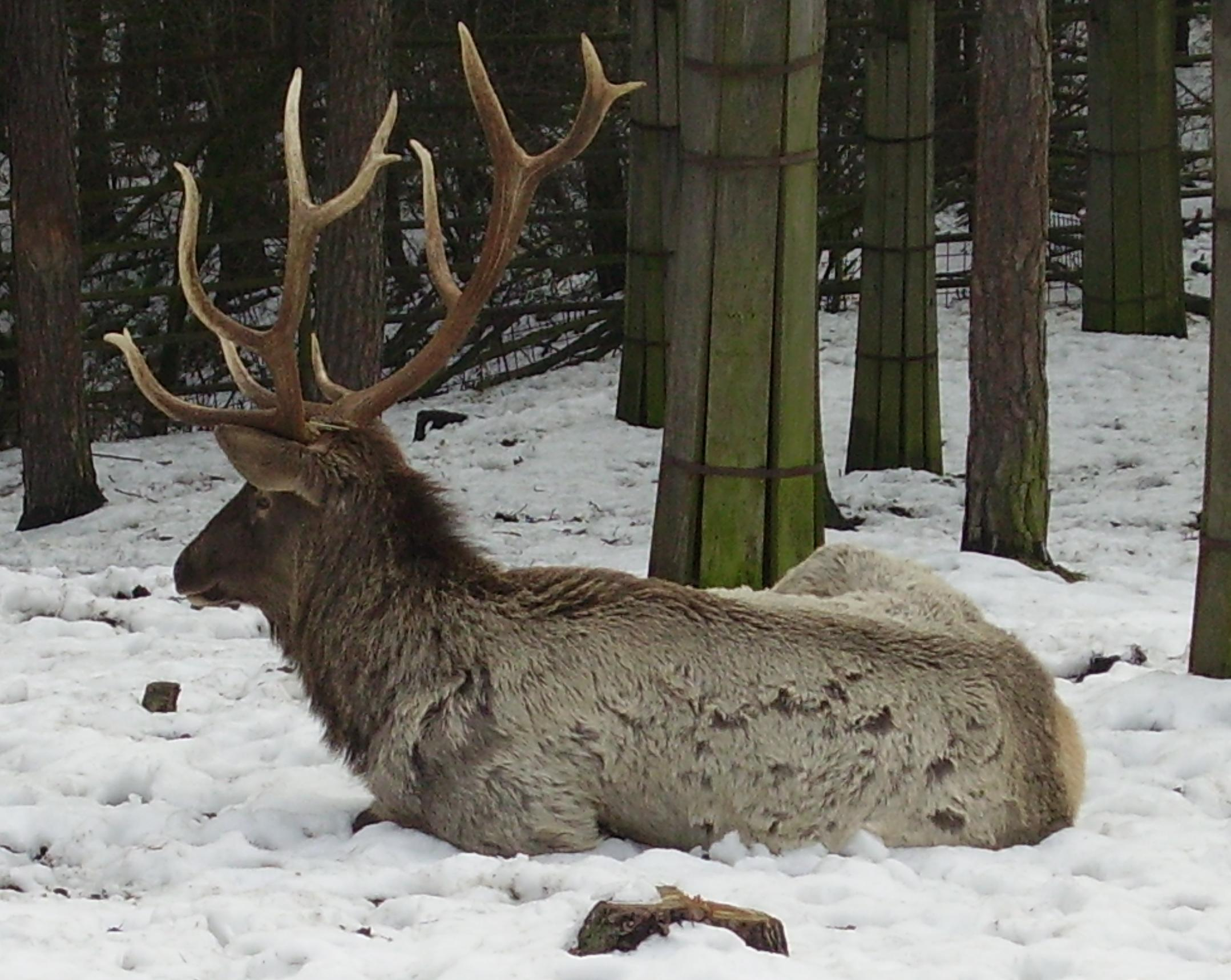
Altai wapiti in the Olomouc Zoo

The Siberian wapiti is similar to other subspecies of Cervus canadensis in that the adults have a lighter toned torso with darker necks and juveniles have thicker fur on the body.

The adult male Altai wapiti has a recorded shoulder height of up to 155 cm (5.1 ft) and a maximum body weight of 300 kg (661.5 lbs), the female Altai wapiti is significantly smaller. The calf of this wapiti is larger than that of other Asiatic wapitis with a weight of 11 to 22 kg (24 to 48.5 lbs) upon birth.
