= Tian Shan wapiti =

Scientific classification
- Kingdom: Animalia
- Phylum: Chordata
- Class: Mammalia
- Order: Artiodactyla
- Family: Cervidae
- Genus: Cervus
- Species: C. canadensis
- Subspecies: C. c. songaricus

Trinomial name
- Cervus canadensis songaricus (Erxleben, 1777)

Subspecies of deer

The Tian Shan wapiti or Tian Shan maral (Cervus canadensis songaricus), is a subspecies of C. canadensis. It is also called the Tian Shan elk in North American English.

== Description ==
It is native to the Tian Shan Mountains in eastern Kyrgyzstan, southeastern Kazakhstan, and North Central Xinjiang of western China. It is the largest subspecies of Asian wapiti, both in body size and antlers.

As a grazing animal, they play an important role in the ecosystem. On the one hand they maintain vegetation growth, and on the other hand are the main food source for predators such as wolves, snow leopards and brown bears.

== Conservation ==
Around 50,000 individual Tian Shan elk are left in the wild, and they are declining at a rapid rate. China has about 4000 to 5000 individuals in deer farms.
