= Lake Alice (Southland) =

Lake in New Zealand

- Location within New Zealand
- Location: Fiordland, Southland, South Island
- Coordinates: 44°58′24″S 167°27′30″E
- Primary inflows: Edith River
- Basin countries: New Zealand
- Surface area: 1.8 square kilometres (0.69 sq mi)

Lake Alice is a small lake at the eastern end of Te Houhou / George Sound approximately 52 km north west of Te Anau in the Southland region of the South Island located within the Rangitīkei River Catchment. The lake is fed by the Edith River and flows into George Sound via Alice Falls.
