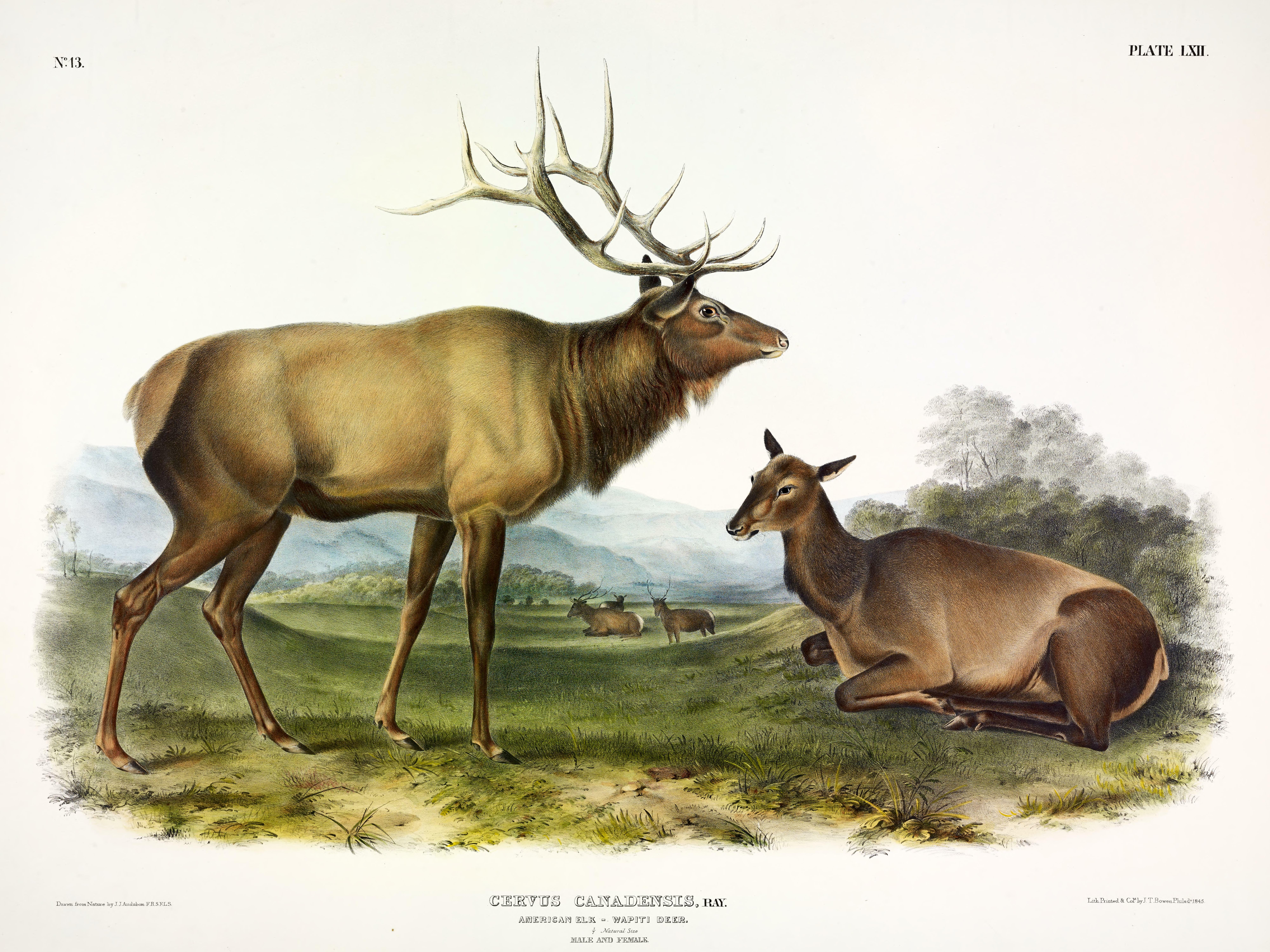
- Illustration of the extinct elk subspecies Cervus canadensis canadensis, John James Audubon 1847

Conservation status
- Extinct (1877)

Scientific classification
- Kingdom: Animalia
- Phylum: Chordata
- Class: Mammalia
- Order: Artiodactyla
- Family: Cervidae
- Genus: Cervus
- Species: C. canadensis
- Subspecies: †C. c. canadensis

Trinomial name
- †Cervus canadensis canadensis (Erxleben, 1777)

= Eastern elk =

Extinct subspecies of elk

The eastern elk (Cervus canadensis canadensis) is an extinct subspecies or distinct population of elk that inhabited the northern and eastern United States, and southern Canada. The last eastern elk was shot in Pennsylvania on September 1, 1877. The subspecies was declared extinct by the United States Fish and Wildlife Service in 1880. Another subspecies of elk, the Merriam's elk, also became extinct at roughly the same time.

As of 2017, the International Union for Conservation of Nature (IUCN) has reclassified all North American elk subspecies aside from the tule and Roosevelt elk as C. c. canadensis. If this is accurate, this means that the subspecies is not extinct, and has returned to the eastern U.S. in the form of the Rocky Mountain elk, introduced to the region in the 20th century.

== Description ==
A full-grown bull could weigh up to 1,000 pounds, stand 50-60 inches tall at the shoulder, and carry a rack of antlers six feet in length.

== History ==
At the start of the European colonization of the Americas in the late 15th century, elk were widespread in North America and could be found throughout most of the continent. Eastern elk inhabited the vast forests of the Eastern Woodlands region as far west as the Mississippi River. As people continued to settle in the region over the next few centuries, elk populations decreased due to over-hunting and the loss of their dense woodland habitat. Naturalist John James Audubon reportedly mentioned that by 1851, a few elk could still be found in the Allegheny Mountains, but that they were virtually gone from the remainder of their range. By the end of the 19th century, the eastern elk was completely extinct. What little is known about this race of elk has been gleaned from remains and historical references. Mitochondrial DNA studies in 2004 indicate that Cervus canadensis are a species distinct from European red deer.

Prehistoric evidence of eastern elk from 2500 years ago has been found in Alabama and Delaware. Eastern elk were extirpated from South Carolina in 1737, Georgia in 1770, North Carolina in 1780, Maryland and Vermont in 1800, New Jersey in 1805, Arkansas and Quebec in 1830, Indiana and Ohio in 1840, Louisiana in 1842, New York in 1847, Illinois and Kentucky in 1850, Virginia in 1855, Tennessee in 1865, Pennsylvania in 1868, West Virginia and Wisconsin in 1875, Michigan in 1880, Iowa in 1885, Minnesota in 1896, and Missouri in 1898.

== Replacement in their former range ==
Not long after the last elk was killed in Pennsylvania, federal officials, worried about mushrooming elk herds in and around Yellowstone National Park, offered the animals to anyone willing to take them. The recently formed Pennsylvania Game Commission took Yellowstone officials up on their offer, and launched a program to reintroduce elk to Pennsylvania. Starting in 1913 and ending in 1926, the Commission released 177 elk in 10 counties, including 50 animals from Yellowstone. Currently, Pennsylvania's elk herd numbers up to 1,400 and their range covers approximately 3,000 mi^{2} (7,800 km^{2}).

In 1990, feasibility studies were conducted to determine if wild, free-ranging elk still had a place in some of their former eastern habitats. Once this was complete, healthy source herds of Rocky Mountain elk from Arizona, Kansas, New Mexico, North Dakota, Oregon, Utah and Alberta's Elk Island National Park were used to introduce elk back into the former eastern elk range.

Successful elk populations have now been introduced in Arkansas (1991), Wisconsin (1995), Ontario (2001), Kentucky, Tennessee and Great Smoky Mountains National Park in 2002, Michigan in 1919, the Missouri Ozarks (2011), and in 2012 Virginia. In late 2016, elk were reintroduced into southern West Virginia. In addition, feasibility studies have also been completed in Illinois and New York (although these have not yet resulted in any elk restorations).

== Remnant populations ==
It is possible that the subspecies may still be extant. In 1905, 18 elk were introduced to Fiordland National Park in New Zealand—a gift from Theodore Roosevelt. The elk were survivors of an original shipment of 20, half of which came from Yellowstone National Park and half from an Indian game reserve in Brookfield, Massachusetts, owned by H.E. Richardson. The latter are believed to be eastern elk captured in northern Minnesota by Native Americans. The possible eastern elk bloodline might explain some unusual characteristics he has seen in New Zealand elk, such as "bifurcated" antlers in which the dagger, or fourth point, forks at the tip.

However, the likelihood of a pure bloodline is very low. Even though the animal population had successfully adapted to the harsh terrain, several factors likely contributed to a dilution of the pure gene pool. To wit, removal of protection in 1935; the crossbreeding with red deer that spread into the area; the gazetting of the Fiordland region as a national park in 1952; and the resulting status of the elk and all introduced game species being relegated to that of noxious animals, or pests, by the government agencies of the time has seen the wild herd go into decline. Today, that herd is but a shadow of its former self, being comprised now only of crossbreeds of varying degree that have defied the efforts of government agencies to exterminate or remove them from Fiordland.

Eastern elk could have also hung on in the extensive forests of Ontario. While evidence is dubious, numerous people reported seeing a band of elk near Sault Ste. Marie, Ontario and Sault Ste. Marie, Michigan in the early 1980s. These elk could be of eastern origin—and could still exist in the wilds of Ontario.

== See also ==
- List of extinct animals of North America
