= Edith River =

River in New Zealand

- Route of the Edith River
- Mouth of the Edith River Edith River (South Island)

Location
- Country: New Zealand

Physical characteristics
- Source
  - coordinates: 44°57′39″S 167°34′32″E
- Mouth
  - location: Lake Alice
  - coordinates: 44°58′21″S 167°28′47″E

Basin features
- Progression: Edith River → Lake Alice → Te Houhou / George Sound → Tasman Sea

The Edith River is a river of Fiordland, New Zealand. It rises to the west of the Edith Saddle and flows westward into Lake Alice, which drains into George Sound.

== See also ==
- List of rivers of New Zealand
