= George River (Southland) =

River in New Zealand

- Route of the George River
- Mouth of the George River George River (Southland) (South Island)

Location
- Country: New Zealand

Physical characteristics
- Source: Mount Sydney Dacres
  - coordinates: 44°55′26″S 167°33′22″E
- Mouth
  - location: Anchorage Cove
  - coordinates: 44°55′44″S 167°24′14″E

Basin features
- Progression: George River → Anchorage Cove → Te Houhou / George Sound → Tasman Sea
- Tributaries
  - right: Trophy Burn

The George River is a river of Fiordland, New Zealand. It rises south of Lake Beddoes and flows westward into George Sound at Anchorage Cove.

== See also ==
- List of rivers of New Zealand
