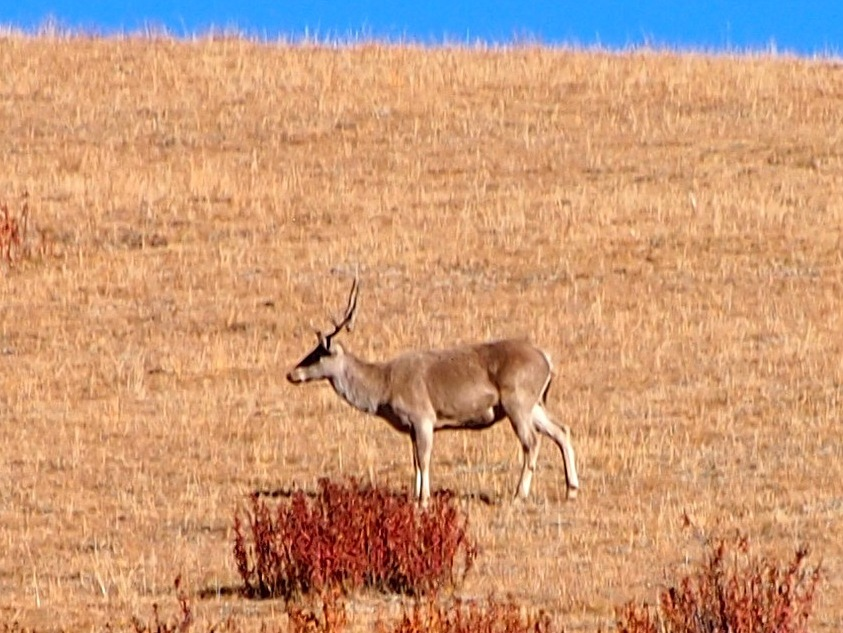

Scientific classification
- Kingdom: Animalia
- Phylum: Chordata
- Class: Mammalia
- Order: Artiodactyla
- Family: Cervidae
- Genus: Cervus
- Species: C. canadensis
- Subspecies: C. c. wallichi

Trinomial name
- Cervus canadensis wallichi (G. Cuvier, 1823)
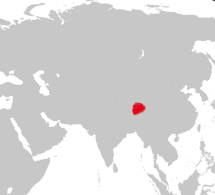

Synonyms
- Cervus canadensis affinis

= Tibetan red deer =

Subspecies of deer

The Tibetan red deer (Cervus canadensis wallichi) also known as shou, is a subspecies of elk/wapiti native to the southern Tibetan highlands and Bhutan. Once believed to be near-extinct, its population has increased to over 8,300, the majority of which live in a 120,000-hectare nature reserve established in 1993 in Riwoqê County, Qamdo Prefecture, Tibet Autonomous Region, China. Some have been kept at the beginning of the 20th century in London, and in a small zoo south of Lhasa.

== Description ==
The Tibetan red deer is relatively massive built with short legs and a large, square muzzle. The winter fur is light sandy-brown, except the grayish face. The summer coat is slate-gray. The large, white rump patch, which includes the short tail, has no dark rim as it is seen in the Sichuan deer, for example. Those from the eastern part of the range have a dark dorsal line and represent probably the C. c. affinis type, which is now usually included in the shou.

== Relationships and range ==
Tibetan red deer, along with Sichuan deer and Kansu red deer, forms the southern group of wapiti. It lives in northern Bhutan and southern Tibet, where it is recorded from the Chumbi Valley close to Sikkim and from Lake Manasarovar. It was believed to be completely extinct until a small population was rediscovered in 1988 in Bhutan and southeastern Tibet. The original range probably covered many smaller valleys of the Brahmaputra River to the north of the Himalaya (Yarlung Tsangpo River). A survey in 1995 brought the exciting finding, that a population of about 200 Tibetan red deer still persists to the north of the Yarlung Tsangpo River close to the village of Zhenqi. As this is the only known viable population of this deer, it is planned to establish a reserve for protection here. Evidence for some other relict populations has been found around the Subansiri River.

They are preyed on by the Himalayan wolf.
