= Whitewater River (New Zealand) =

River in New Zealand

- Route of the Whitewater River
- Mouth of the Whitewater River Whitewater River (New Zealand) (South Island)

Location
- Country: New Zealand

Physical characteristics
- Source
  - coordinates: 44°59′32″S 167°19′36″E
- Mouth
  - location: Te Houhou / George Sound
  - coordinates: 44°56′42″S 167°21′31″E

Basin features
- Progression: Whitewater River → Te Houhou / George Sound → Tasman Sea

The Whitewater River is a river in Fiordland, New Zealand, flowing eastward into George Sound.

== See also ==
- List of rivers of New Zealand
