= Alashan wapiti =

Scientific classification
- Kingdom: Animalia
- Phylum: Chordata
- Class: Mammalia
- Order: Artiodactyla
- Family: Cervidae
- Genus: Cervus
- Species: C. canadensis
- Subspecies: C. c. alashanicus

Trinomial name
- Cervus canadensis alashanicus (Bobrinskii & Flerov, 1935)

Subspecies of deer

The Alashan wapiti (Cervus canadensis alashanicus) is an Asian subspecies of wapiti (Cervus canadensis), or elk as they are called in North America.

The Alashan wapiti is found in pockets of Northern China and Mongolia. The Alashan wapiti is the smallest subspecies of wapiti and has the lightest coat color. It is the least-studied subspecies of wapiti, with little formal research having been conducted; this is partially due to the deer’s vast, remote distribution over frequently inaccessible terrain, as well as smaller, fragmented overall populations.

This subspecies of wapiti may be synonymous with the Manchurian wapiti (C. c. xanthopygus) as found in a 2004 study on the genetics of the red deer (Cervus elaphus).
