= George Sound =

Fiord of the South Island of New Zealand

Te Houhou / George Sound
- Te Houhou (Māori)
- Location in New Zealand Te Houhou / George Sound (New Zealand)
- Interactive map of Te Houhou / George Sound
- Location: Tasman Sea
- Coordinates: 44.850°S 167.35°E
- River sources: George River, Whitewater River, Edith River.
- Basin countries: New Zealand
- Max. length: 26 kilometres (16 mi)
- Max. width: 1,500 metres (1,600 yd)

Te Houhou / George Sound is a fiord of the South Island of New Zealand. It is one of the fiords that form the coast of Fiordland.

== Geography ==
The fiord is located between Taitetimu / Caswell Sound and Hāwea / Bligh Sound, on the northern central Fiordland coast. At 26 kilometres (16 mi) in length and over 1,500 metres (1,600 yd) wide at its widest point, it is the longest fiord in northern Fiordland. George Sound extends in a roughly northwestern direction, and has two major indentations; Southwest Arm in the south, and Anchorage Cove halfway along its northeastern shore.

Several rivers enter the fiord, the largest of which are the George River, the Whitewater River, and the Edith River. The George River flows into Anchorage Cove, halfway along the northeast coast of the fiord. The Whitewater River enters the fiord's southwest coast almost opposite the mouth of the cove. The Edith River and nearby smaller Katherine Creek both enter the southeastern end of the fiord, with the Edith River flowing through Lake Alice and over the 56-metre (184 ft) Alice Falls into the waters of the fiord.

A walking track connects the mouth of Katherine Creek with Lake Hankinson, close to the top of Lake Te Anau, over the Henry Pass.

== Name ==
A. W. Reed lists two plausible origins for the fiord's name in his seminal Place Names of New Zealand (1975): "Although it has been recorded that the sound was named after the King George, commanded by Captain S. Chase, it is almost certain that it was named after George Stevens, the pilot of HMS Acheron." In October 2019, the name of the fiord was officially altered to Te Houhou / George Sound.
