= Sichuan deer =

Scientific classification
- Kingdom: Animalia
- Phylum: Chordata
- Class: Mammalia
- Order: Artiodactyla
- Family: Cervidae
- Genus: Cervus
- Species: C. canadensis
- Subspecies: C. c. macneilli

Trinomial name
- Cervus canadensis macneilli (Lydekker, 1909)
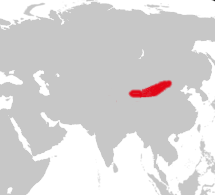

Subspecies of deer

The Sichuan deer (Cervus canadensis macneilli), also known as MacNeill's deer, is a subspecies of the elk native to Western China.

== Description ==
This large, highland deer is of very pale, finely spotted color with gray or brownish black. The winter coat is of a brownish wash. These deer, along with the Tibetan red deer, are the largest subspecies of Central Asian red deer. Older adult males may carry six tines on each antler similar to wapiti subspecies. Also, unlike other Central Asian red deer subspecies, females do have short neck manes during the winter.

== Range/discovery ==
This rare deer was first described in 1909 from a female specimen. 26 years later, male specimens were found and its true status became known. It lives along the Chinese-Tibetan border.
