= Johann Christian Polycarp Erxleben =

German naturalist (1744–1777)

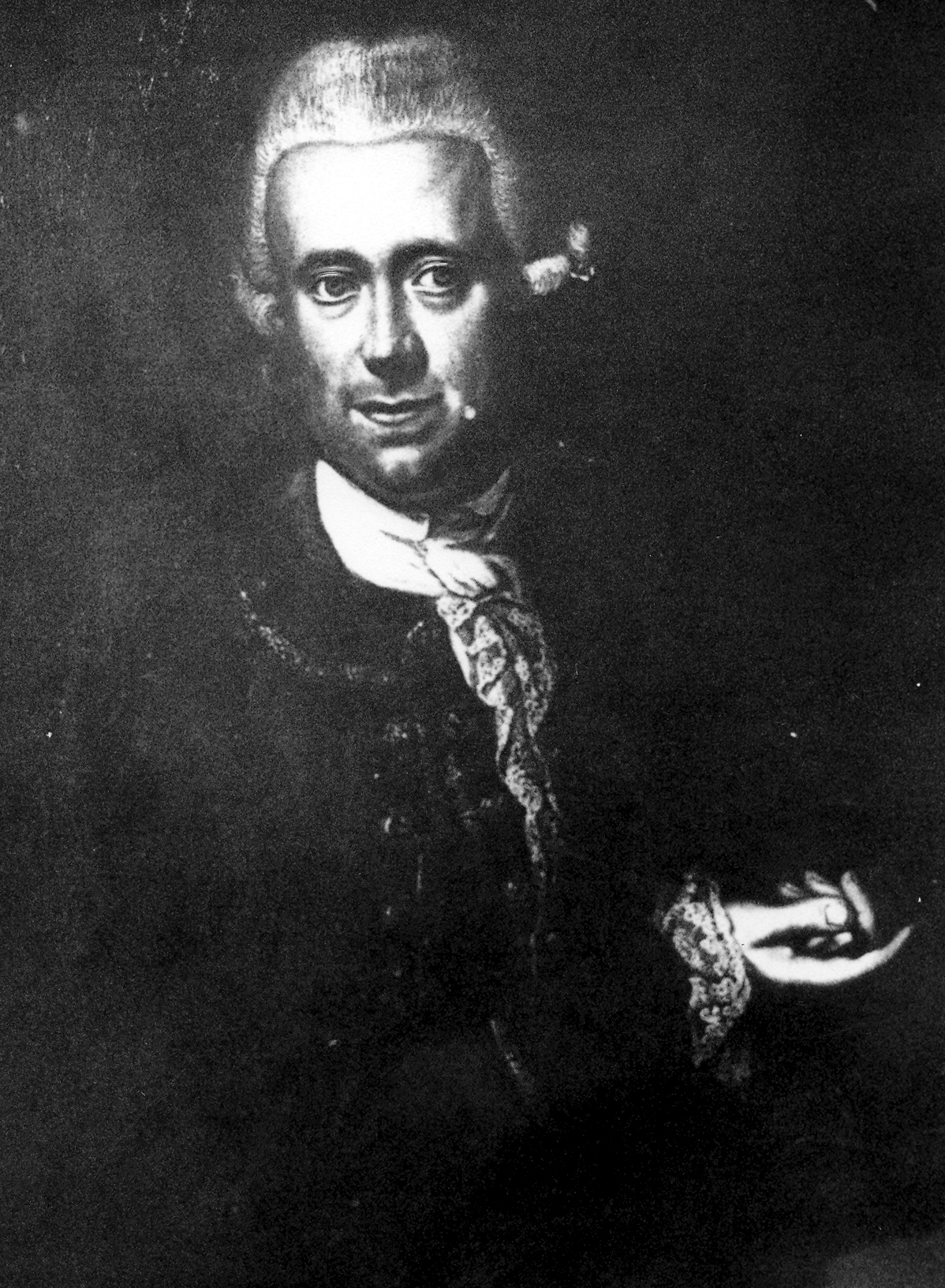
- Born: Johann Christian Polycarp Erxleben; 22 June 1744; Quedlinburg, Kingdom of Prussia
- Died: 19 August 1777 (aged 33); Göttingen, Electorate of Hanover, Holy Roman Empire
- Education: University of Göttingen
- Mother: Dorothea Christiane Erxleben
- Scientific career
- Fields: Naturalist
- Workplaces: University of Göttingen
- Doctoral advisor: Abraham Gotthelf Kästner
- Doctoral students: Christian von Weigel

Johann Christian Polycarp Erxleben (German: [ˈjoːhan ˈkʁɪsti̯a(ː)n ˈpɔlykaʁp ˈɛʁksˌleːbn̩]; 22 June 1744 – 19 August 1777) was a German naturalist from Quedlinburg.

Erxleben was professor of physics and veterinary medicine at the University of Göttingen. He wrote Anfangsgründe der Naturlehre (1772) and Systema regni animalis (1777). He was founder of the first and oldest academic veterinary school in Germany, the Institute of Veterinary Medicine, in 1771.

He was the son of Dorothea Christiane Erxleben, the first woman in Germany to earn a medical degree.

== Works ==
- 1767 Einige Anmerkungen über das Insektensystem des Hr. Geoffroy und die Schäfferschen Verbesserungen desselben. Hannoverisches Magazin, Hannover (Stück 20). 305–316.
- 1772 Anfangsgründe der Naturlehre. Göttingen und Gotha, Dieterich 648 p., 8 Taf.
- 1775 Anfangsgründe der Chemie. Göttingen, Dieterich, 472p. Digital edition by the University and State Library Düsseldorf
- 1769–1778 Pallas, P. S., Baldinger, E. G., Erxleben, J. C. P. [full title] Peter Simon Pallas Naturgeschichte merkwuerdiger Thiere, in welcher vornehmlich neue und unbekannte Thierarten durch Kupferstiche, Beschreibungen und Erklaerungen erlaeutert werden. Durch den Verfasser verteutscht. I. Band 1 bis 10te Sammlung mit Kupfern. Berlin und Stralsund, G. A. Lange (Samml. 1–10), 48 Taf.
