= Tral Wildlife Sanctuary =

Coordinates: 33.995°N 75.115°E

- IUCN category IV (habitat/species management area)
- Interactive map of Tral Wildlife Sanctuary
- Location: Pulwama district, Jammu and Kashmir, India
- Area: 154.15
- Established: 2019

Tral Wildlife Sanctuary is a protected area in Tral town in the Pulwama district of the Indian Union Territory of Jammu and Kashmir. It is located about 26 km from Pulwama town, the district headquarter and 44 km from Union Territory Capital Srinagar. It was formed on 26 October 2019, for the protection of the endangered hangul in the region. It is spread over an area of 154.15 km^{2} (59.52 sq mi) and came into being by merging Panyar-Shikargah and Khiram wildlife conservation reserves and few other forest compartments of Awantipora forest division. The sanctuary acts as a buffer around the Dachigam National Park and Overa-Aru wildlife sanctuary. As of 2024, there are 14 Hanguls in the sanctuary, second to Dachigam National Park which has 275 Hanguls.
