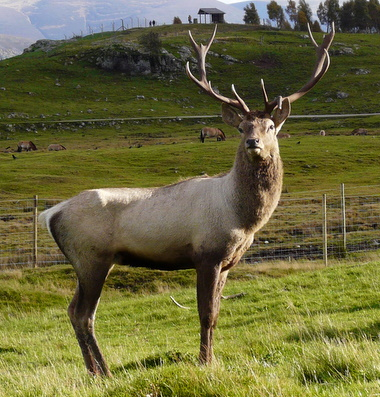
- Captive stag in Highland Wildlife Park, United Kingdom

Conservation status
- Least Concern (IUCN 3.1)

Scientific classification
- Kingdom: Animalia
- Phylum: Chordata
- Class: Mammalia
- Order: Artiodactyla
- Family: Cervidae
- Genus: Cervus
- Species: C. hanglu

Binomial name
- Cervus hanglu Wagner, 1844

Subspecies
- C. h. hanglu; C. h. bactrianus; C. h. yarkandensis

= Central Asian red deer =

Species of deer

The Central Asian red deer (Cervus hanglu), also known as the Tarim red deer, is a deer species native to Central Asia, where it used to be widely distributed, but is scattered today with small population units in several countries. It has been listed as Least Concern on the IUCN Red List since 2017. It was first described in the mid-19th century.

== Taxonomy ==
The scientific name Cervus hanglu was proposed by Johann Andreas Wagner in 1844 for a deer specimen from Kashmir, India that differed from the red deer (Cervus elaphus) in the shape and points of the antlers.

=== Subspecies ===
In the 19th and early 20th centuries, the following red deer specimens from Central Asia were described:

- Cervus cashmeriensis was proposed by Andrew Leith Adams in 1858 for the red deer occurring in the montane forests of Kashmir, India.
- Cervus yarkandensis proposed by William Thomas Blanford in 1892 was a red deer stag killed in the Tarim River basin, East Turkestan.
- Cervus bactrianus proposed by Richard Lydekker in 1900 was a live deer caught in the vicinity of Tashkent in Uzbekistan and brought to England. Two years later, he considered this ungulate to be a red deer subspecies (C. e. bactrianus).
- Cervus hagenbeckii proposed by a Russian zoologist in 1904 for a red deer from Russian Turkestan that was sent to the Moscow Zoo in the 1890s.

In 1951, John Ellerman and Terence Morrison-Scott recognised all these specimens as subspecies of the red deer. In 2005, Peter Grubb also considered the proposed taxa as subspecies of the red deer.

IUCN Red List assessors provisionally recognised its status as a distinct species in 2017. The Central Asian red deer is thought to comprise three subspecies:

- the Kashmir stag (C. h. hanglu), the nominate subspecies, is endemic to Kashmir in India;
- the Bactrian deer (C. h. bactrianus) ranges throughout Central Asia;
- the Yarkand deer (C. h. yarkandensis) ranges in Xinjiang Province of western China.

=== Phylogeny ===
An analysis of mitochondrial DNA of 125 tissue samples from 50 populations of the genus Cervus included two samples from Tajikistan and three from western China. The results supported the classification of the red deer populations in Central Asia as two distinct red deer subspecies. Results of a subsequent phylogenetic analysis of Cervinae tissue samples indicated that deer samples from Central Asia form a distinct clade and warrant to be raised to species level. The Central Asian red deer group appears to have genetically diverged from the European red deer group during the Chibanian period between 770,000 and 126,000 years ago.

The first phylogenetic analysis using hair samples of the deer population in Dachigam National Park of Jammu and Kashmir, India, was published in 2015. Results showed that these samples form a subcluster within the Central Asian red deer group; they are genetically closer to this group than to the European red deer.

== Description ==
The Central Asian red deer's fur is light ginger in colour.
