= Syrdarya–Turkestan State Regional Natural Park =

State nature park in Kazakhstan

- Kazakh: Сырдария-Түркістан өңірлік паркі,
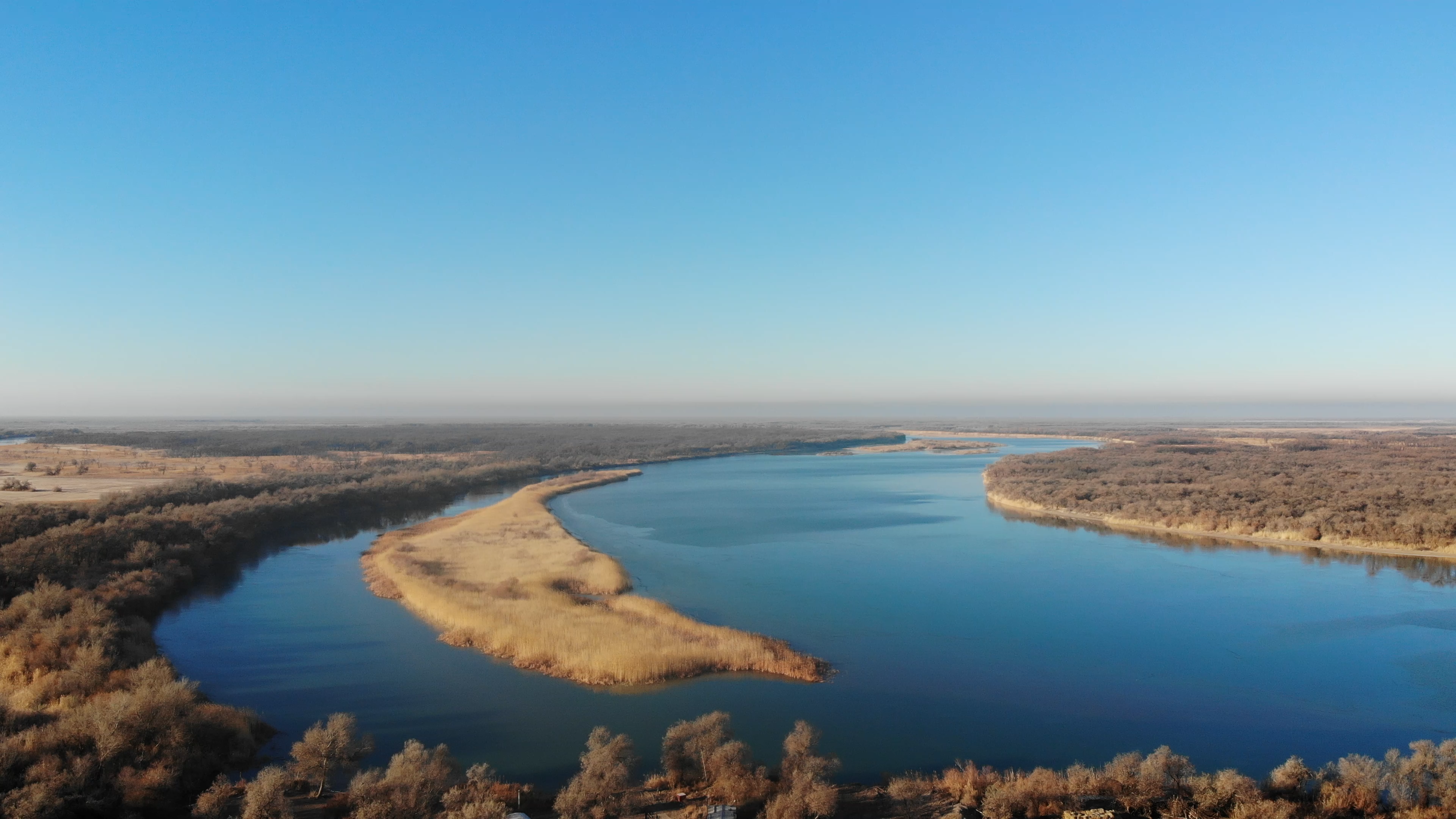
- Tugai forest in the Sydarya valley

- Location within Kazakhstan
- Location: Turkistan Region
- Coordinates: 42.778704°N 68.229332°E
- Established: 2012

Syrdarya–Turkestan State Regional Natural Park is a protected area in the Turkistan Region of Kazakhstan, which opened on 5 September 2012.

== History ==
The Syrdarya–Turkestan State Regional Natural Park was established to protect ecosystems, archaeological sites, and historical-cultural monuments, as well as plants and animal species, some of which are rare or endangered. The park was established in 2010, through the merger of three existing state parks within Arys, Boralday, and Turkistan, and opened on September 5, 2012. The goal was to prioritize the Syr Darya river plain, in order to further protect the wildlife of the area. Additionally the Syr Darya river irrigates many of the agricultural regions in the whole of Central Asia. The area of the park is 120,000 hectares (roughly 296,526 acres). The total area of the park is divided into 4 functional zones – a protected area, an ecological stabilization zone, a zone of tourist and recreational activities, and a zone of limited economic activity.

About 955 species of plants grow in the park, among which 40 species are listed in the Red Book of the Republic of Kazakhstan, a government published book of rare and endangered species within the country. The fauna of the park includes about 382 species of birds and animals. 109 of them are listed in the Red Book of Kazakhstan. One of the attractions of the park is the only nursery in the Republic of Kazakhstan to restore the population of Bactrian deer (also known as Bukhara deer). The park has 25 species of bed bugs, from 8 taxonomy families have been found and studied. The Tutybulak cave is located in within the park and has been studied for the archeology, specifically from the Stone Age.

It has become a site for ecological tourism. However in 2022, there have been concerns of the ecotourism causing environmental damage and pollution in the river.

== See also ==
- History of the central steppe
- Northern river reversal
