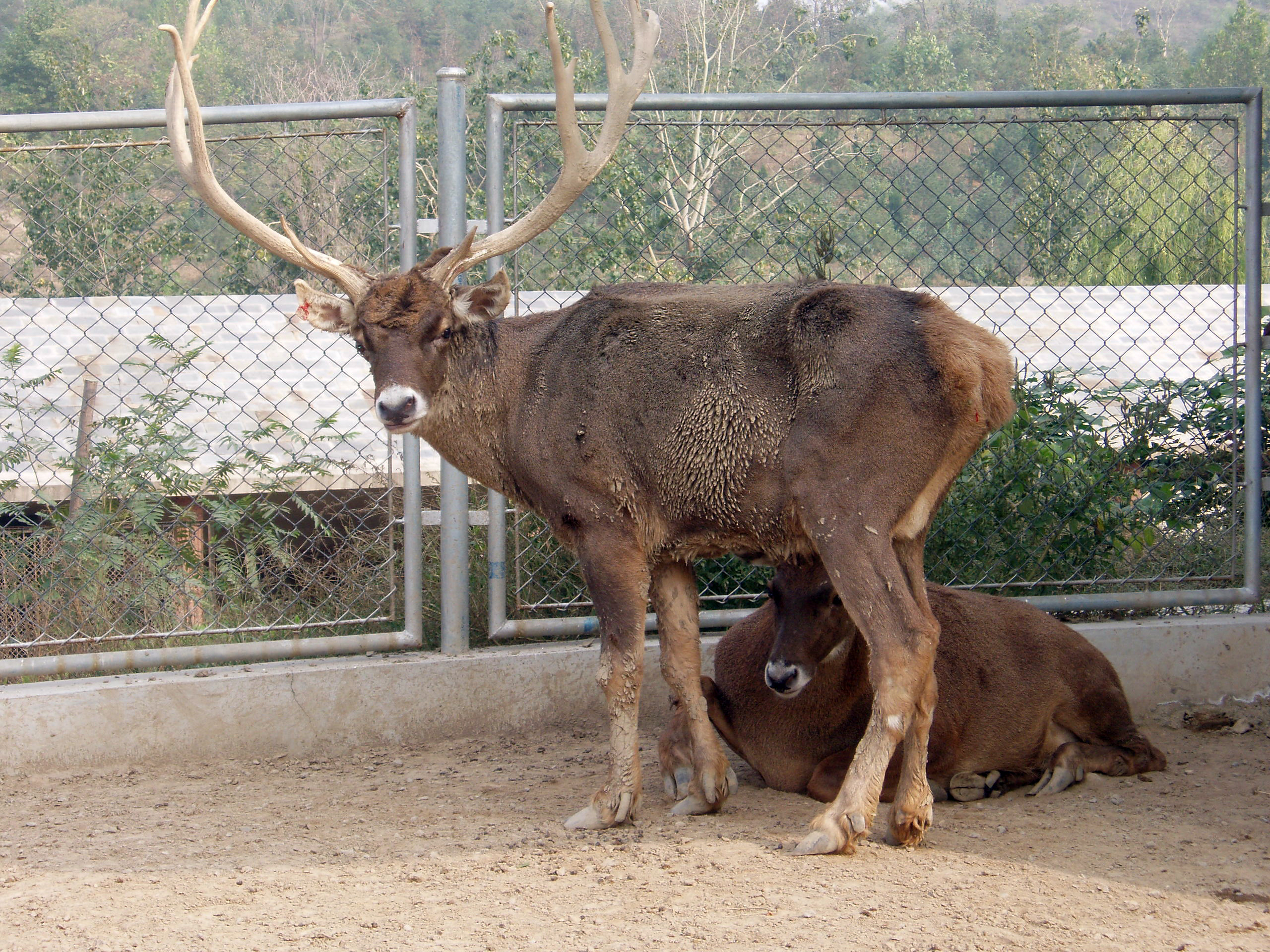
- Stag (male) Thorold's deer.
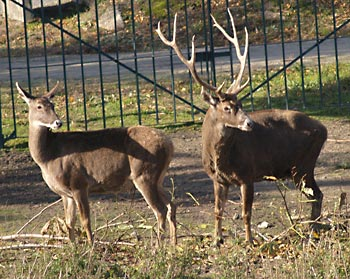
- Pair of Thorold's deer; doe (female) at left, stag (male) to right.

Conservation status
- Vulnerable (IUCN 3.1)

Scientific classification
- Kingdom: Animalia
- Phylum: Chordata
- Class: Mammalia
- Infraclass: Placentalia
- Order: Artiodactyla
- Family: Cervidae
- Genus: Cervus
- Species: C. albirostris

Binomial name
- Cervus albirostris (Przewalski, 1883)

Synonyms
- Przewalskium albirostris Przewalskium albirostre

= Thorold's deer =

Species of mammal

Thorold's deer (Cervus albirostris) is a threatened species of deer found in the grassland, shrubland, and forest habitats, at high altitudes, of the eastern Tibetan Plateau, as well as some fragmented areas further north in central Western China. It is also known as the white-lipped deer (or baichunlu, 白唇鹿, in Simplified Chinese, ཤྭ་བ་མཆུ་དཀར།་ in Standard Tibetan) for the white fur around its snout.

Thorold's deer is one of the larger ungulate mammals within its range, and fills an ecological niche similar to the Tibetan red deer (or shou, the subspecies Cervus elaphus wallichi of the red deer species group). It was first scientifically described by Nikolay Przhevalsky in 1883. As of early 2011, more than 100 of the deer are kept globally in Species360-registered zoos, and, in 1998, it was estimated that about 7,000 remained in the wild.

== Taxonomy and nomenclature ==
In the late 1870s, Polish-Russian explorer Nikolay Przhevalsky encountered Thorold's deer in his expedition to Tibet. A Cossack named Kalmynin hunted two maral-like animals which Przhevalsky determined to belong to a separate species, Cervus albirostris. Of these specimens, only one managed to be analysed, as the other carcass was devoured by wolves.

The specific epithet albirostris combines the Latin albus and rostrum, referring to this deer species' white muzzle and lips. For this reason, Cervus albirostris is known by the alternative name "white-lipped deer".

=== Evolution ===
The cervid family first appears in the Asian fossil record around the Oligocene, and the subfamily Cervinae about 13.8 million years ago. This genus is first represented by the species Cervus magnus, which is known from the early-mid Pliocene of China.

Approximately 2.5 to 2.6 million years ago, during the Late Pliocene, the lineage leading to wapiti, Sika deer, and Thorold's deer split from the red deer lineage. Thorold's deer and the common ancestor of sika deer and wapiti diverged 1.7 million years ago, during the Early Pleistocene. Moldovan palaeontologist Roman Croitor suggests Thorold's deer is a descendant of the Eurasian genus Eucladoceros.

== Description ==
Thorold's deer is one of the largest deer species, with a shoulder height around 115 to 140 cm (45 to 55 in). Males, which typically weigh from 180 to 230 kg (400 to 510 lb), are significantly larger than females, at 90 to 160 kg (200 to 350 lb) in weight. The hair is coarse and grey-brown over most of the body, fading to yellowish buff on the underparts, with a distinct reddish-brown patch on the rump, and a ridge of darker hair running down the spine. During winter, the coat is paler, and about twice as thick as during the summer, being thicker even than that of a moose. The head is darker than the rest of the body, especially in males, and contrasts with pure white markings on the lips, around the nose, and the throat just below the chin.

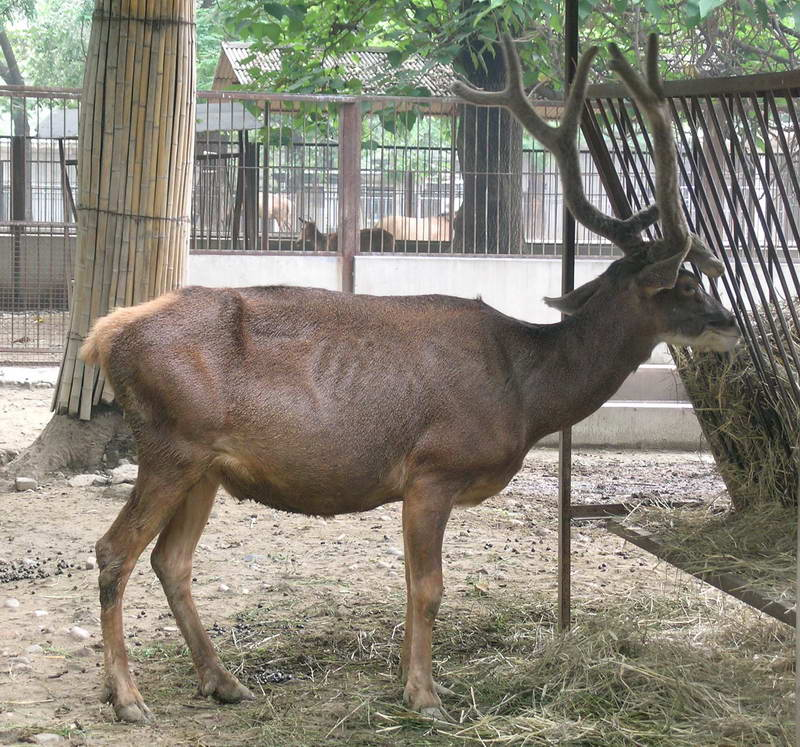
Male Thorold's deer

Adult male Thorold's deer have antlers, measuring up to 110 cm (43 in) in beam length, and weighing up to 4 kg (8.8 lb). Compared with those of wapiti or red deer, the antlers are flattened with the first and second ("bez") tines noticeably far apart. The antlers can have up to seven tines, which all lie in the same plane. They are shed annually in March, reaching their full length by late summer. Other distinctive features include longer ears than most other deer, lined with white hair, and large metatarsal and preorbital glands. The hooves are broad and heavy, with unusually long dewclaws. The tail is short, at 12 to 13 cm (4.7 to 5.1 in) in length.

Thorold's deer has a number of physical and physiological adaptations to its high-altitude environment. The short legs and broad hooves make it an agile climber, able to use steep mountainous terrain to escape predators. Their nasal cavities are unusually large, allowing them to breathe in rarified high-altitude air, while the thick hair protects against the cold. The red blood cells in this species are smaller than average for similarly sized mammals. They are very numerous, both features that increase its ability to take up limited amounts of oxygen.

== Distribution and habitat ==
Thorold's deer primarily inhabits the Chinese provinces of Tibet, Sichuan, Qinghai, Gansu, and far northwestern Yunnan. However, they are found only in scattered populations across these regions, apparently being most numerous in eastern Sichuan Province, where they are known from Garzê Tibetan Autonomous Prefecture (to the west of Ya'an and Chengdu). Further to the west, in Qinghai, the species is commonly known from the areas around Yushu City and Nangqên, Zhidoi and Zadoi Counties, while the northern extent of their range appears to be the mountains between Jiuquan and Haixi Mongol and Tibetan Autonomous Prefecture.

With regards to habitat and environment, the white-lipped deer seems to favour a "mixed-mosaic" of grassland, shrubland and forest. Their ideal habitat is often located well-above the treeline, and they are known for frequenting elevations between 3,500 to 5,100 metres (11,500 to 16,700 ft)—among the highest of any deer species in the world, besides the South American taruca (Hippocamelus antisensis). The white-lipped deer also migrates between elevations, seasonally; as the weather cools in the autumn, they descend from their high-elevation spring-summer pastures, where the conditions are more comfortable (and the swarms of biting insects are less prolific), down to lower, wind-sheltered woodlands and valleys where they will stay for the duration of winter.

== Behaviour ==
Thorold's deer is a crepuscular animal, and normally lives in herds of at least 10 individuals, with bachelor male herds and female-juvenile herds staying separated until the breeding season. Older males typically travel alone, or occasionally cohabitate with a smaller group of similarly-aged bucks. In past centuries, herds containing hundreds of the deer were reported at high elevations; however, today, herds of over 50-100 individuals are rare. Like wapiti, with their square-shaped lips, they are predominantly grazers that feed on a wide range of low-growing terrestrial plants, primarily grasses and sedges, but also browse on occasion and will consume larger plants (such as rhododendrons and willows). They have few natural predators, although Himalayan wolves and snow leopards have been known to eat Thorold's deer on occasion, and stray or feral dogs may target fawns.

Like other deer species, Thorold's deer has a range of vocalisations, including loud alarm calls, screams and whistles (which are audible over 500 m (1,600 ft) away), bellows and growls (made by males in rut), and quieter grunts, mews made by females and young. Like reindeer, they can also make unusual, loud snapping sounds from their carpal bones, the function of which is unclear. Thorold's deer rarely run, but they can gallop at up to 35 miles (56 km) per hour.

== Reproduction ==
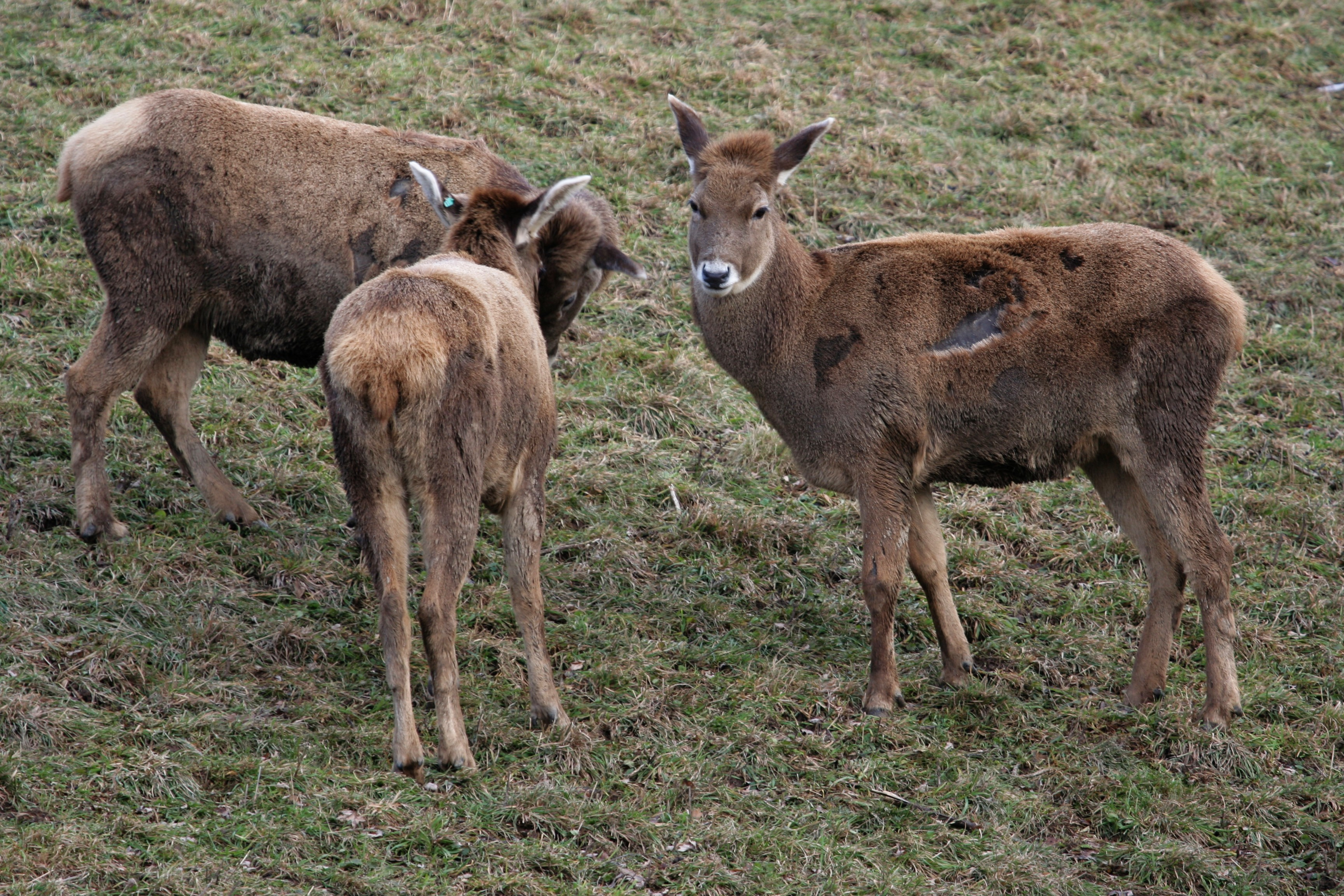
Female Thorold's deer

The rut occurs between September and November, when herds containing both males and females become more common. Such herds consist of several males, each maintaining a small harem of females that they protect from other males. Males compete with one another in a manner similar to other deer - wrestling with antlers, scent marking, visual displays, and grunting warning sounds. Mating consists of a single rapid thrust.

The female gives birth to a single young after a gestation period of 220 to 250 days, typically in either May and June. Shortly before giving birth, the mother locates a secluded den, often in bushes or shrubby cover. The calves are born with white spots, and able to stand within about 40 minutes of birth. Initially, the mother protects them by moving them between a number of different locations, only visiting them twice a day to allow them to suckle. After about two weeks, they rejoin the herd.

The calves' spots begin to fade after around six weeks, and they attain the full adult colour by the end of their first year. They become sexually mature during their second or third year, although males are rarely successful in the rut until they are at least five years old. Thorold's deer have been reported to live up to 21 years in captivity, but probably do not survive for more than 12 years in the wild.

== Conservation ==
Thorold's deer is found only in scattered populations across its former range, although the remoteness of its preferred habitat makes it difficult to study in detail. It faces threats from advancing human agriculture, including competition from domestic animals such as sheep, goats, and yaks. It is also hunted, for meat, antlers, and other body parts (such as the velvet) used in traditional Chinese medicine. The species is listed as vulnerable by the IUCN and is a Class I protected species in China.

The species has been farmed for its antlers in China and New Zealand, and is also found in numerous zoos worldwide. It appears able to adapt to being kept at low altitudes without much difficulty.

== See also ==
- List of endangered and protected species of China
