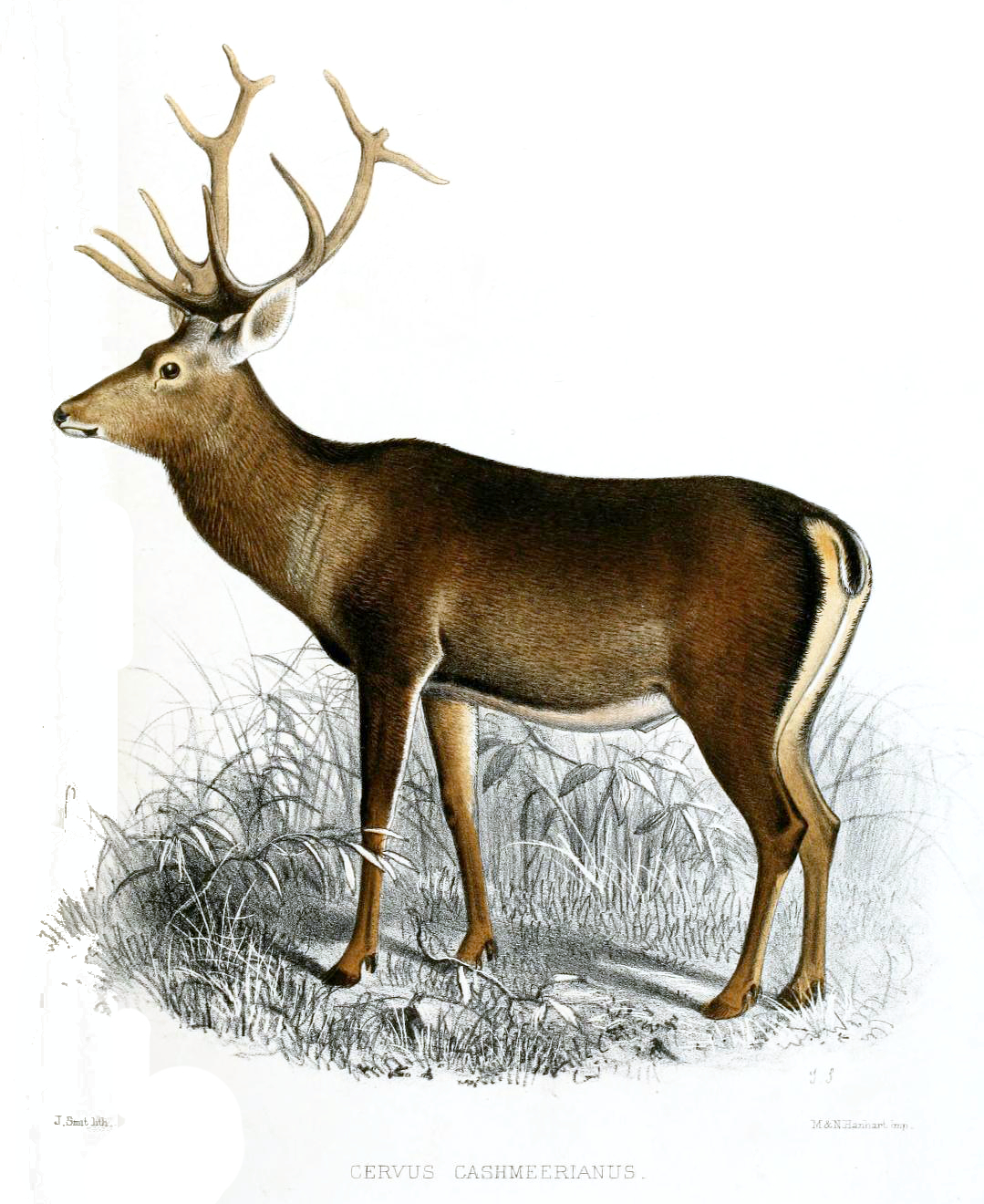

Conservation status
- Critically Endangered (IUCN 3.1)
- CITES Appendix I

Scientific classification
- Kingdom: Animalia
- Phylum: Chordata
- Class: Mammalia
- Order: Artiodactyla
- Family: Cervidae
- Genus: Cervus
- Species: C. hanglu
- Subspecies: C. h. hanglu

Trinomial name
- Cervus hanglu hanglu Wagner, 1844

= Kashmir stag =

Deer subspecies

The Kashmir stag, also called hangul (Kashmiri pronunciation: [hãːɡul]), is a subspecies of Tarim red deer found in dense riverine forests in the Himalayan valleys and mountains of Northern India, specifically in the Indian states of Jammu and Kashmir and Himachal Pradesh. In the Kashmir Valley, it is found primarily in Dachigam National Park and in the Tral Wildlife Sanctuary, where it receives protection, and elsewhere it is more at risk. In the Chamba Himalayas, it used to occur in the Gamgul Siyabehi Wildlife Sanctuary. In the 1940s, the population was between 3000 and 5000 individuals, but since then habitat destruction, over-grazing by domestic livestock and poaching have reduced population dramatically. Its population is now grown marginally to 323 in 2025 from 197 in 2004. It is the state animal of the Indian union territory of Jammu and Kashmir. It is the only surviving Asiatic sub-species of the Red deer family.

Earlier believed to be a subspecies of red deer (Cervus elaphus), a number of mitochondrial DNA genetic studies later had the hangul as a part of the Asian clade of the elk (Cervus canadensis). The IUCN and American Society of Mammalogists, however, include it in the new grouping of Central Asian red deer (Cervus hanglu), with the Kashmir stag being the type subspecies (Cervus hanglu hanglu).

== Appearance ==
This deer has a light rump patch without including the tail. Its coat color is brown with a speckling to the hairs. The inner sides of the buttocks are greyish white, followed by a line on the inner sides of the thighs and black on the upper side of the tail. Each antler consists of five tines. The beam is strongly curved inward, while the brow and bez tines are usually close together and above the burr.

== Distribution and ecology ==
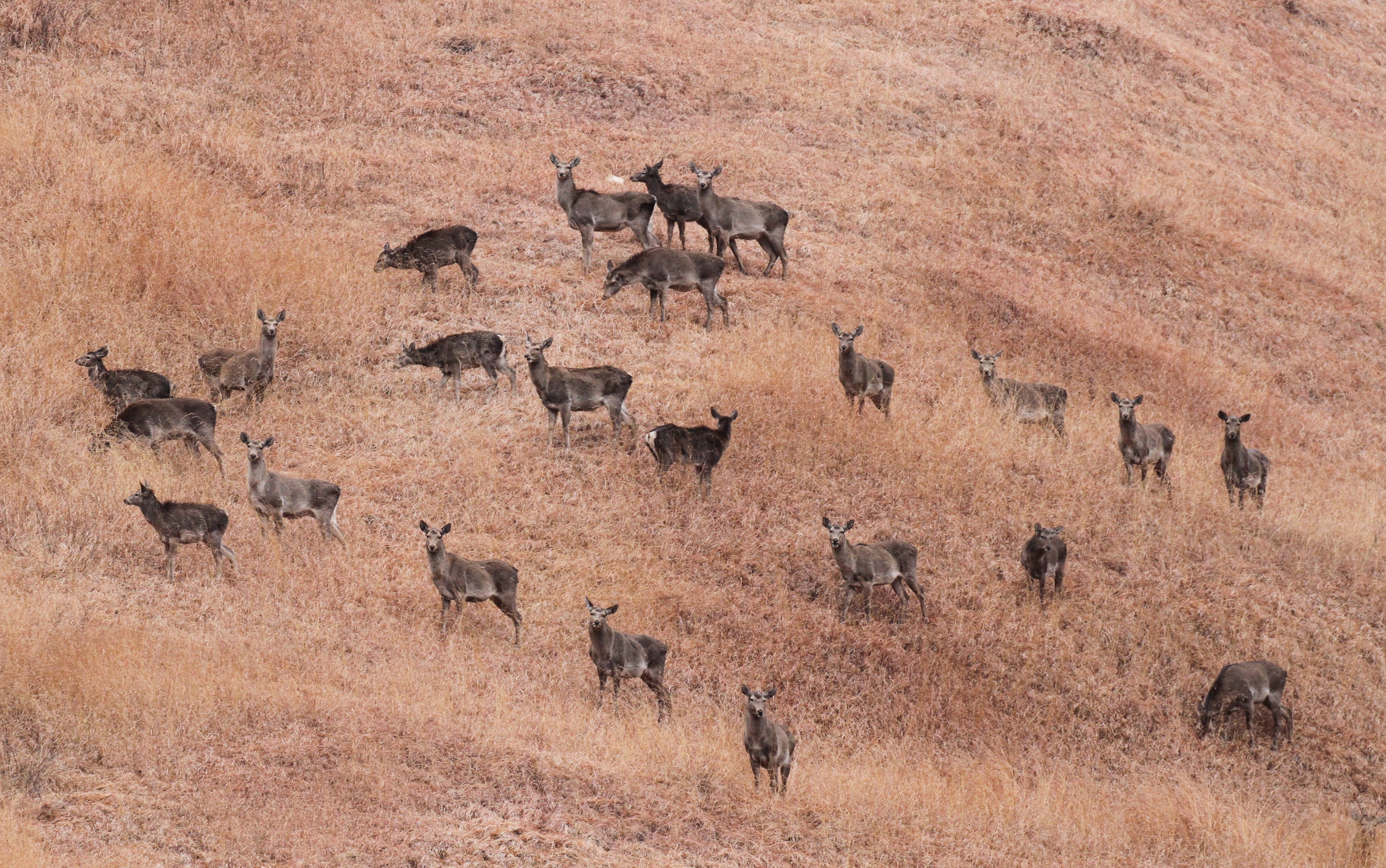
A group at Dachigam National Park

This deer lives in groups of two to 18 individuals in dense riverine forests, high valleys, and mountains of the Kashmir Valley and northern Chamba in Himachal Pradesh. In Kashmir, it's found in the Dachigam National Park (and its nearby areas at elevations of 3,035 meters), Rajparian Wildlife Sanctuary, Overa Aru, Sind Valley, and in the forests of Kishtwar & Bhaderwah.

== Threats and conservation ==
These deer once numbered from about 5,000 animals in the beginning of the 20th century. Unfortunately, they were threatened, due to habitat destruction, over-grazing by domestic livestock, and poaching. This dwindled to as low as 150 animals by 1970. However, the state of Jammu & Kashmir, along with the IUCN and the WWF prepared a project for the protection of these animals. It became known as Project Hangul. This brought great results and the population increased to over 340 by 1980.

Much of the earlier published material was by the distinguished E. P. Gee, a member of the Bombay Natural History Society. Shortly before the expedition was mounted, Fiona Guinness and Tim Clutton-Brock, both noted deer experts, had visited Kashmir and had gathered some useful field data, which confirmed that Hangul numbers were at a dangerously low level.

The traditional breeding grounds of the hangul deer is upper danchigam, which is now occupied by Gujar shepherds and their dogs in summer.

The subspecies is battling for its survival in its last bastion: they are now scattered within 141 km^{2} of the Dachigam National Park located on foothills of Zabarwan range on the outskirts of Srinagar. Known for its magnificent antlers with 11 to 16 points, hangul was once distributed widely in the mountains of Kashmir. During the 1940s, their number was believed to be about 3,000-5,000. In the year 2004 there were 197 (sex ratio of 19 for 100 females and 23 fawns for 100 females) Hanguls which reduced to 153 in 2006 (sex ratio of 21 males for 100 females and 9 fawns for 100 females). As per the census in 2008, only around 160 exist. In 2015, the Hangul population estimation exercise was conducted in which the count of Hanguls in and around their habitats in Kashmir valley is just 186. There are plans to breed them in captivity to increase their chances of survival.

A survey in 2019 conducted by collaring the hangul has revealed that the species is no longer confined within the walls of Dachigam National Park. The endangered subspecies has now begun to use an old migratory route which spread through Sind Valley up to Tulail in Gurez Valley. The corridor was last known to be active in the early 1900s.

== Population ==
Year	Total count	Males per 100 females	Fawns per 100 females	notes
2004	197	19	23	
2006	153	21	9	
2008	127	N/A	N/A	
2009	175	26	27	
2011	218	29	25	
2015	186	22	14	
2017	214	16	19	
2019	237	15.5	7.5	
2021	263	N/A	N/A	
2023	289	N/A	N/A	
2025	323	N/A	N/A	

As of 2023, of the 289 Hanguls, 275 are in Dachigam National Park and 14 are in Tral Wildlife Sanctuary, which is considered as the second home of Hangul.
