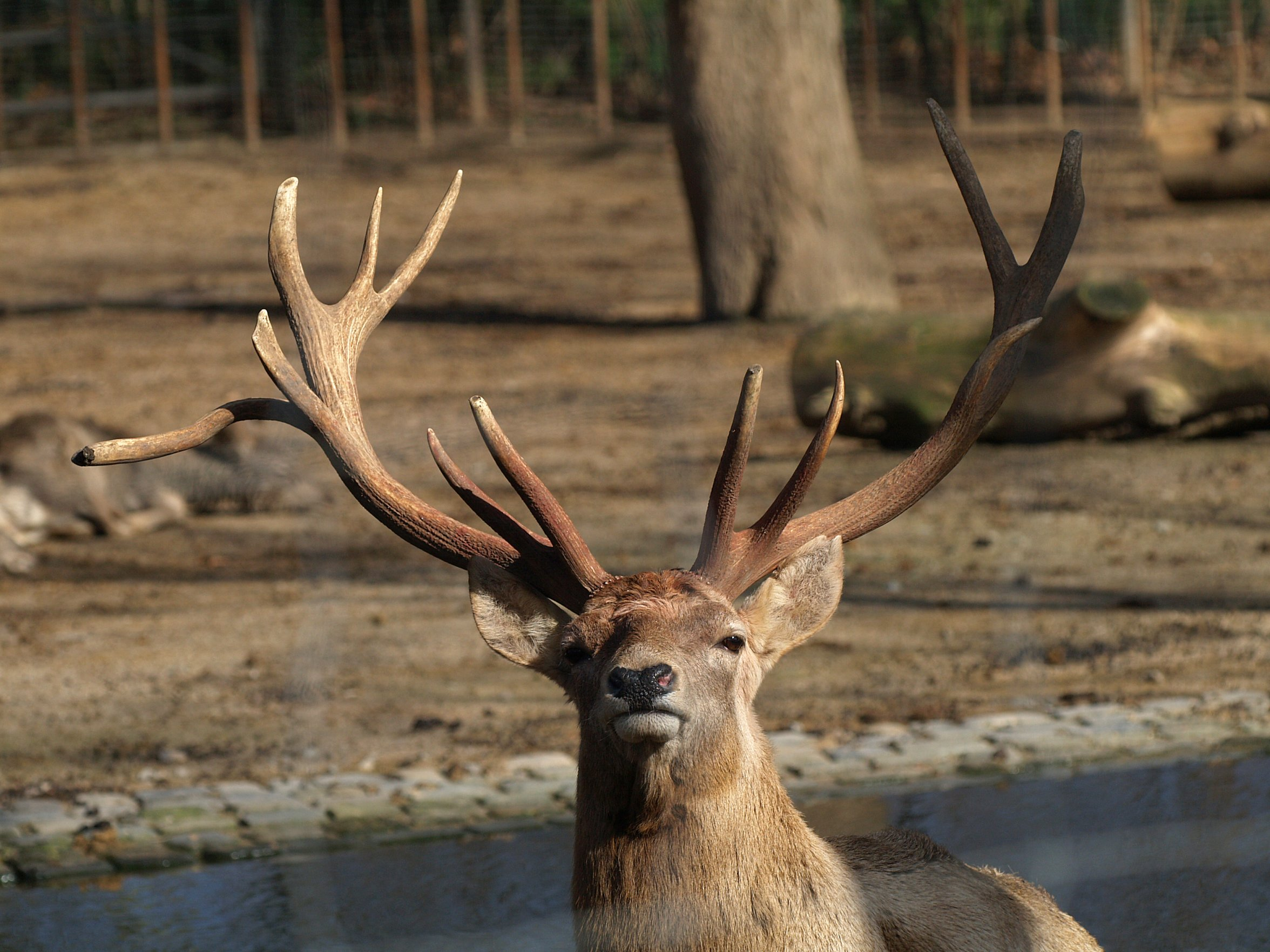
- Male (Stag)
- CITES Appendix II

Scientific classification
- Kingdom: Animalia
- Phylum: Chordata
- Class: Mammalia
- Order: Artiodactyla
- Family: Cervidae
- Genus: Cervus
- Species: C. hanglu
- Subspecies: C. h. bactrianus

Trinomial name
- Cervus hanglu bactrianus Lydekker, 1900
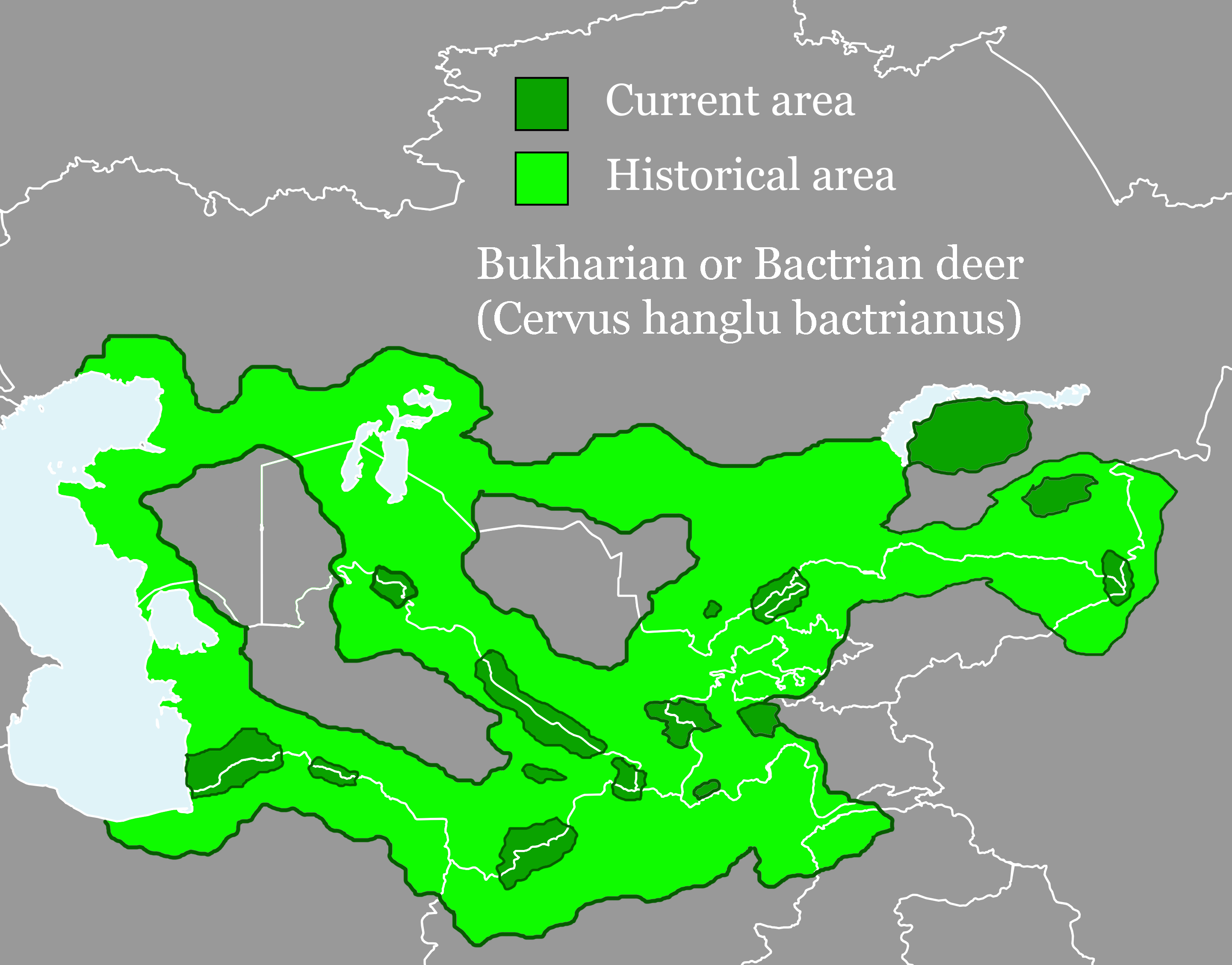
- The historical(bright green) and current(dark green) areas in range map of Bactrian deer

= Bactrian deer =

Subspecies of deer

The Bactrian deer (Cervus hanglu bactrianus), also called the Bukhara deer, Bokhara deer, or Bactrian wapiti, is a lowland subspecies of Central Asian red deer native to Central Asia. It is similar in ecology to the related Yarkand deer (C. h. yarkandensis) in that it occupies riparian corridors surrounded by deserts. The subspecies are separated from one another by the Tian Shan Mountains and probably form a primordial subgroup of the red deer.

== Description ==
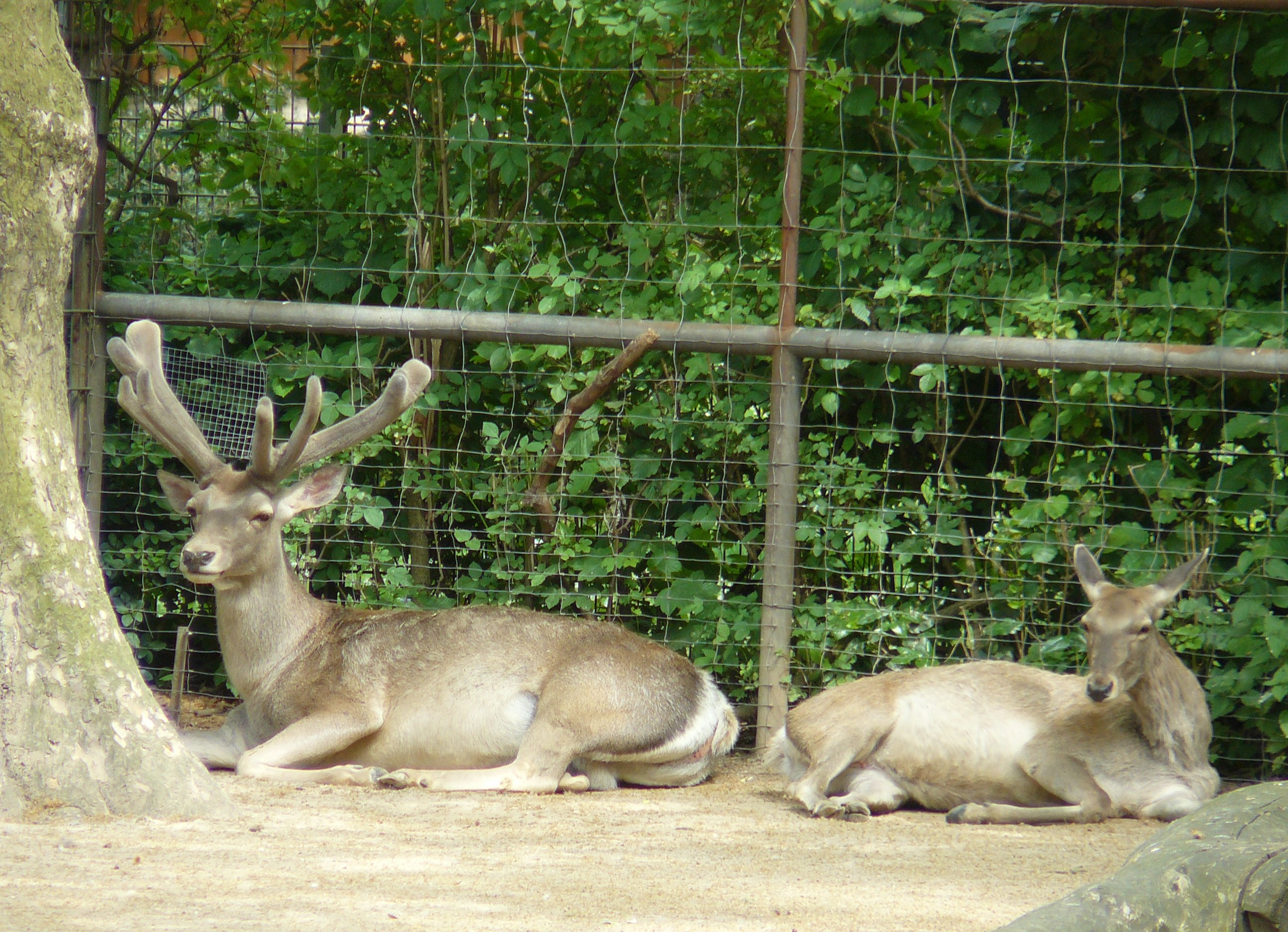
Bactrian deer

This deer is usually ashy-gray with yellowish sheen, and a grayish white rump patch. It also has a slightly marked dorsal stripe and a white margin of the upper lip, lower lip, and chin. The antlers are light in color. Usually, four tines are present, with the absence of bez tines. The fourth tine is better developed than the third. Full-grown individuals, however, have five tines on each antler with a bend after the third tine that is characteristic of most Central Asian red deer subspecies.

In contrast to the Yarkand deer, which has a light sandy coat, the Bactrian deer has a darker, grayish-brown coat pattern with darker legs, head, and neck (most noticeable in males) that resembles the coat of the American elk (C. canadensis) or wapiti, which is why this subspecies is sometimes called the Bactrian wapiti. These deer do not have neck manes, but do have stronger and thicker neck muscles than female deer that may give the appearance of a neck mane. Female deer are slightly smaller than male deer, but the difference in size is not as pronounced as it is in the European red deer (C. elaphus) species.

Bactrian deer have, like Yarkand deer, short tails similar to the short tails of wapitis. The calves are generally born spotted much like European red deer calves, and most individuals lose their spots by adulthood, but adult Bactrian deer may have a few spots on the backs of their summer coats. This phenomenon has also been observed in summer coats of the distantly related Manchurian wapiti (C. c. xanthopygus) and subspecies of red deer.

== Range ==
This deer is found in central Khorasan. It is found in Russian Turkestan (West Turkestan) and adjacent areas in northern Afghanistan to the west of the Tian Shan Mountains. Bactrian deer live in lowland riparian corridors of mixed deciduous (willow/poplar) vegetation surrounded by deserts. They do not migrate, but may disperse into adjacent desert areas at night or at times of cooler temperatures.

== Population ==
By 1999, not more than 400 Bukhara deer remained. The population diminished most drastically in Tajikistan because of military conflicts. Since then, though, environmental organizations have taken steps to save the species.

Moreover, World Wide Fund for Nature implemented a reintroduction programme to bring Bukhara deer back to the places where they had once inhabited. For example, Bactrian deer have been reintroduced into the Zarafshan reserve in Uzbekistan; and in the Syrdarya–Turkestan State Regional Natural Park in the Turkistan Region of Kazakhstan. In 2021, it was announced that the Ile-Balkhash Nature Reserve in Kazakhstan released 61 Burkhara deer in efforts to revive the species in the Balkhash Region.

As a result of conservation efforts, the deer populations have increased. In 2006, about 1,000 deer lived in Central Asia. The largest wild populations were found in 2009 in the Karatchingil Nature Reserve (320–350 animals) in the neighborhood of Altyn-Emel National Park in Kazakhstan; in the Badai Tugai Nature Reserve (374 animals) in Uzbekistan; and in the Tigrovaya Balka Nature Reserve (>150 animals) in Tajikistan. The total wild population in 2011 is 1,430 and increasing.

== Conservation ==
Under the auspices of the Convention on Migratory Species of Wild Animals, also known as the Bonn Convention, the Memorandum of Understanding (MoU) concerning Conservation and Restoration of the Bukhara Deer was concluded and came into effect on 16 May 2002. Acknowledging that the Bukhara deer faces threat of extinction as a result of human activities, the MoU provides an intergovernmental framework for governments, scientists and other groups to monitor and coordinate ongoing conservation efforts.

In 2013, ecologist Zalmai Moheb and a team of researchers found positive sign on their existence.

The fourth release of Bactrian deer was held in the Ile-Balkhash State Nature Reserve, reported the Forestry and Wildlife Committee of the Kazakh Ministry of Ecology, Geology, and Natural Resources on July 11, 2022. Overall, there are 150 species to date.

== Predators ==
Aside from man, the Himalayan wolf is probably the most dangerous of predators that most Bactrian deer encounter. Occasionally, the brown bear prey on these deer, as well. Other possible predators are dholes and snow leopards. Eurasian lynx and wild boars sometimes prey on the calves. In the past, they were also hunted by the now-extinct Caspian tiger.
