= Badai Tugai Nature Reserve =

Nature reserve in Uzbekistan

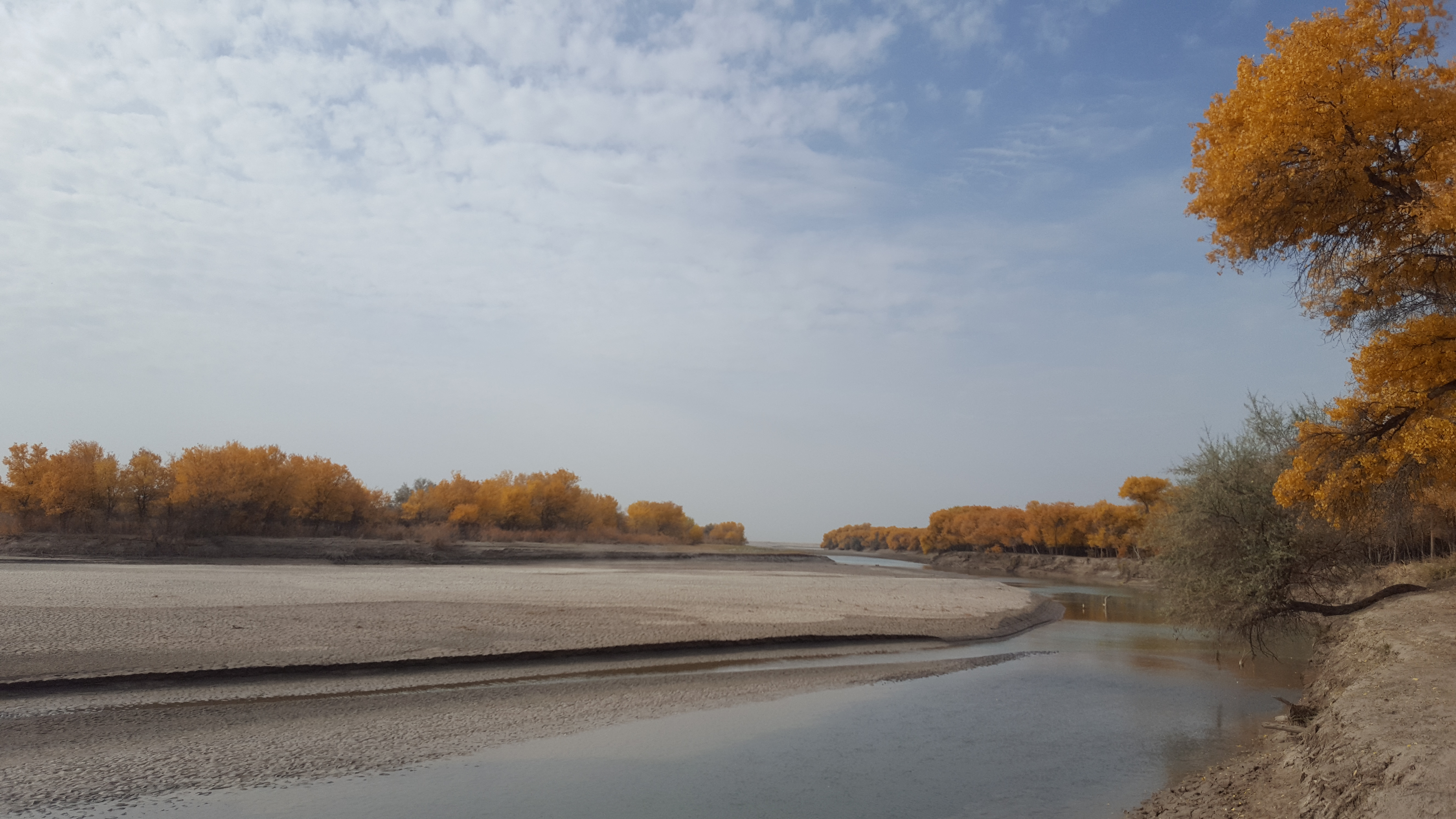
- Badai Tugai in October 2018
- Interactive map of Badai Tugai Nature Reserve
- Location: Beruniy District; Karakalpakstan, Uzbekistan
- Nearest city: Mangʻit
- Coordinates: 42.02°N 60.35°E
- Area: ca. 64 km^{2} (25 sq mi)
- Established: 1971

The Badai Tugai Nature Reserve is located at the banks of the Amu Darya river in Uzbekistan. It was founded in 1971 on 6400 ha and is the only Nature Reserve in Karakalpakstan. It was included in UNESCO's list of Biosphere Reserves, through the Man and Biosphere program, as part of the Lower Amudarya State Biosphere Reserve, in 2011.

Bukhara deer cub in the reserve

The reserve contains riparian vegetation, including poplar forests and is home of 91 species of birds and 21 species of mammals. Among them is the rare Bactrian deer.

== Species ==
Some species and types of species that can be found in the reserve include:

- Amudarya pseudopods, large and small
- Aral barbel
- Asp
- Badger
- Bactrian deer
- Big-eared hedgehog
- Bream
- Catfish
- Common carp
- Fox
- Grass carp
- Jackal
- Pelecus
- Pike fish
- Pike perch
- Reed cat
- Steppe ferret
- Thornfish
- Tolai hare
- Weasel
- Wild boar
