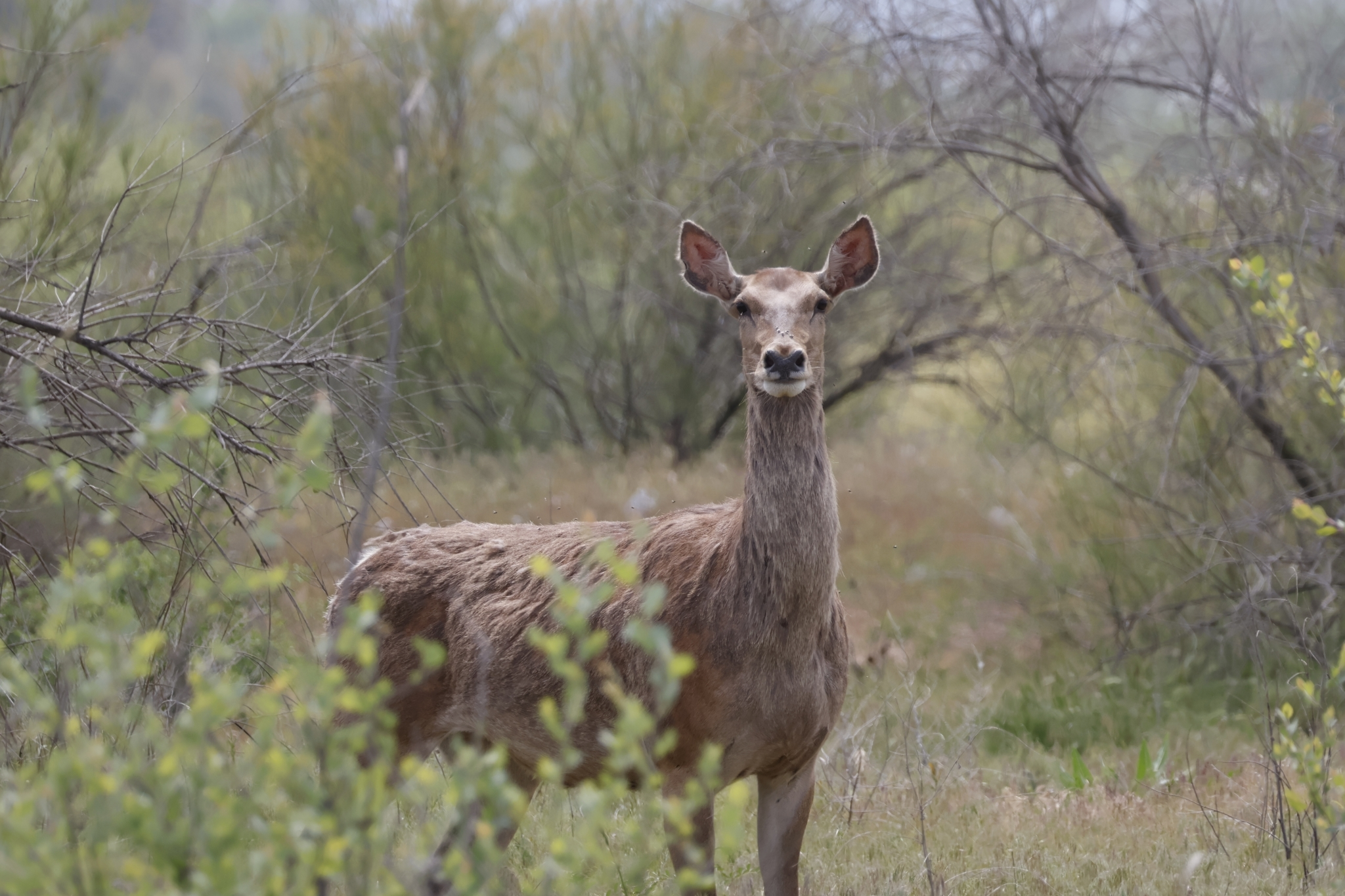

Scientific classification
- Kingdom: Animalia
- Phylum: Chordata
- Class: Mammalia
- Order: Artiodactyla
- Family: Cervidae
- Genus: Cervus
- Species: C. hanglu
- Subspecies: C. h. yarkandensis

Trinomial name
- Cervus hanglu yarkandensis Blanford, 1892

= Yarkand deer =

Subspecies of deer

The Yarkand deer (Cervus hanglu yarkandensis), also known as the Tarim deer or Lop Nor stag, is a subspecies of the Central Asian red deer that is native to the province of Xinjiang, China. It is similar in ecology to the related Bactrian deer (C. h. bactrianus) in occupying lowland riparian corridors surrounded by deserts. Both populations are isolated from one another by the Tian Shan Mountains and probably form a primordial subgroup of the Central Asian red deer.

== Description ==
This deer is light rufous in color with a large light-colored patch, including the tail. Its antlers usually have five tines with a terminal fork pointing forward. The fifth tine is usually larger than the fourth and is inclined inward.

== Range and habitat ==
The Yarkand deer lives in the Tarim Basin deciduous forests and steppe ecoregion of the Tarim, Kaidu, and Qiemo river basins in China's Xinjiang Autonomous Region (East Turkestan). They are dependent on the lowland riparian corridors for food and shelter. They do not migrate, but may disperse into adjacent desert areas at night or at times of cooler temperatures. The deer population in the Tarim basin declined from over 10,000 in the 1950s to fewer than 3,000 in the 1990s.

== Ecology ==
Yarkand deer are preyed on by the Himalayan wolf.
