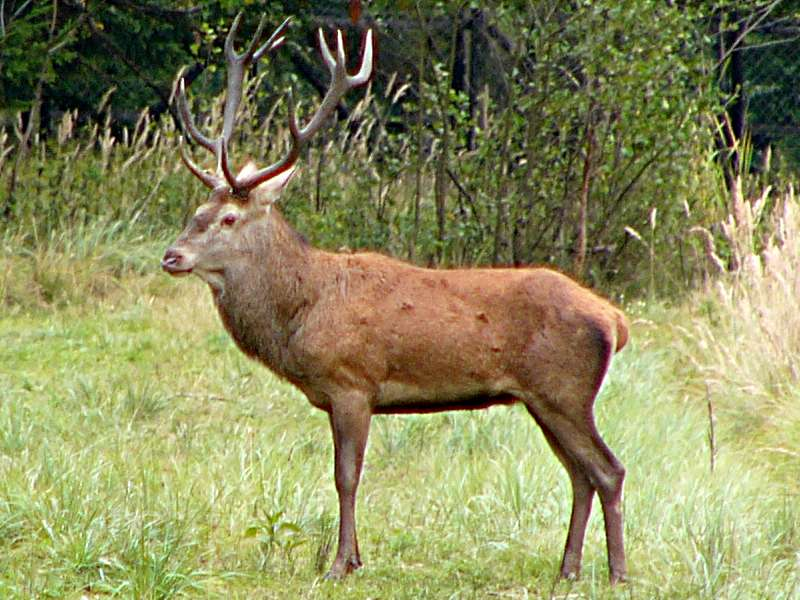
- Cervus elaphus

Scientific classification
- Kingdom: Animalia
- Phylum: Chordata
- Class: Mammalia
- Order: Artiodactyla
- Family: Cervidae
- Tribe: Cervini
- Genus: Cervus; Linnaeus, 1758

Type species
- Cervus elaphus Linnaeus, 1758

Living species
- C. albirostris (Thorold's deer); C. canadensis (elk); C. elaphus (red deer); C. hanglu (Central Asian red deer); C. nippon (sika deer); Also see text

= Cervus =

Cervus Temporal range: Pliocene–Recent

Genus of deer and elk

Cervus is a genus of deer that primarily are native to Eurasia, although one species occurs in northern Africa and another in North America. In addition to the species presently placed in this genus, it has included a whole range of other species now commonly placed in other genera. Additionally, the species-level taxonomy is in a state of flux.

== Taxonomy ==
=== Genus ===
Until the 1970s, Cervus also included the members of the genera Axis, Dama, and Elaphurus, and until the late 1980s, it included members of Rucervus and Rusa.

=== Species ===
In the third edition of Mammal Species of the World from 2005, only the red deer (C. elaphus) and sika deer (C. nippon) were recognized as species in the genus Cervus. Genetic and morphological evidence suggest more species should be recognized. For example, the species Cervus canadensis (elk/wapiti) is considered a separate species.

==== Red deer species group ====
Within the red deer species group, some sources have recommended the Central Asian red deer (Cervus hanglu) should be treated as a species. If the Central Asian red deer (from the Caspian Sea to western China) is recognized as a species, it includes the Yarkand deer and Bactrian deer (the two may be synonymous), but it could possibly also include the Kashmir stag, which has not been sampled in recent studies. If it is included in the Central Asian red deer, the scientific name of that species is C. hanglu. If it is not included, the scientific name of that species is C. yarkandensis, and the Kashmir stag (C. hanglu) may represent a separate monotypic species. The Central Asian red deer was considered its own species (including the Yarkand deer, Kashmir stag and Bactrian deer as subspecies) by the IUCN in 2017, and by the American Society of Mammalogists in 2021.

Others members of the red deer group, which may represent separate species, are C. corsicanus, C. wallichi and C. xanthopygus. If so, C. corsicanus includes the subspecies C. c. barbarus (perhaps a synonym of corsicanus), and is restricted to Maghreb in North Africa, Corsica and Sardinia. C. wallichi would probably include the subspecies C. w. kansuensis and C. w. macneilli (both are perhaps synonyms of C. w. wallichi), and would be found from Tibet to central China. C. xanthopygus would probably include the subspecies C. x. alashanicus (perhaps a synonym of C. x. xanthopygus), and would be found from the Russian Far East to northeastern China. This would restrict the "true" red deer (C. elaphus) to Europe, Anatolia, the Caucasus and northwestern Iran, and the elk/wapiti (C. canadensis) to North America and the Asian regions of the Tian Shan, Altai, and Great Khingan. Alternatively, the barbarus group species are subspecies of the "true" red deer, while the C. wallichii and C. xanthopygus groups are subspecies of the elk/wapiti.

==== Sika deer species group ====
It has been proposed that the sika deer should be split into four species based on genetics, morphology and voice, although this may be premature based on the presently available evidence. If split, the potential species are C. yesoensis from northern and central Japan (Hokkaido and northern and central Honshu), C. nippon of southern Japan (southern Honshu, Shikoku, Kyushu, Okinawa, Tsushima and other small islands), C. hortulorum of mainland Asia (the Russian Far East, Korea, central and eastern China and northern Vietnam), and C. taiouanus of Taiwan.

==== Phylogeny ====
A 2014 mitochondrial DNA study showed the internal phylogeny of Cervus to be as follows:

- Cervus
  - West Eurasian clade
    - C. elaphus (Red deer)
    - C. hanglu (Central Asian red deer)
  - East Eurasian clade
    - C. albirostris (Thorold's deer)
    - - C. nippon (Sika deer)
      - C. canadensis (Elk)
- Rusa

=== Fossil species ===
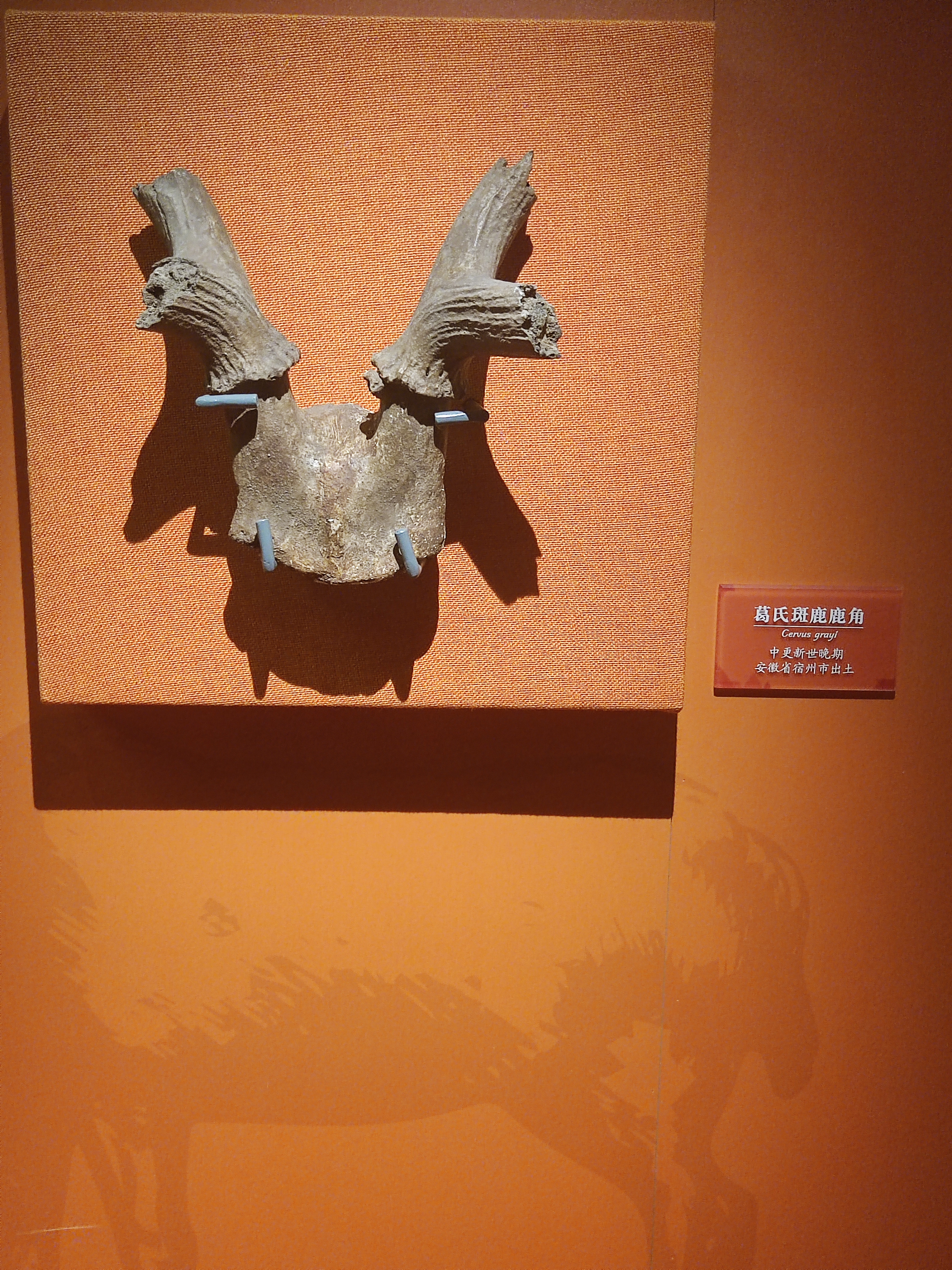
†Cervus grayi

The oldest member of the genus Cervus is Cervus magnus, known from the early-mid Pliocene of China. Other species include:

- †Cervus astylodon – dwarf deer endemic to the Ryukyu Islands of Japan
- †Cervus grayi
- †Cervus sivalensis

== Mating system ==
Members of the genus Cervus have polygynous mating systems within harems. These harems consist of several males, numerous females and their young offspring 1–3 years in age Members of this genus have a yearly breeding season where they display sensory exploitation, intrasexual competition, and weaponry. Females will fight for optimal mating opportunities and sexually selection for males with larger antler size and/or greater roar quality. The degree of polygyny and female aggregation is dependent on the level of food distribution. Females aggregating in areas with more food leading to larger harems Female distribution influences the level of polygyny.

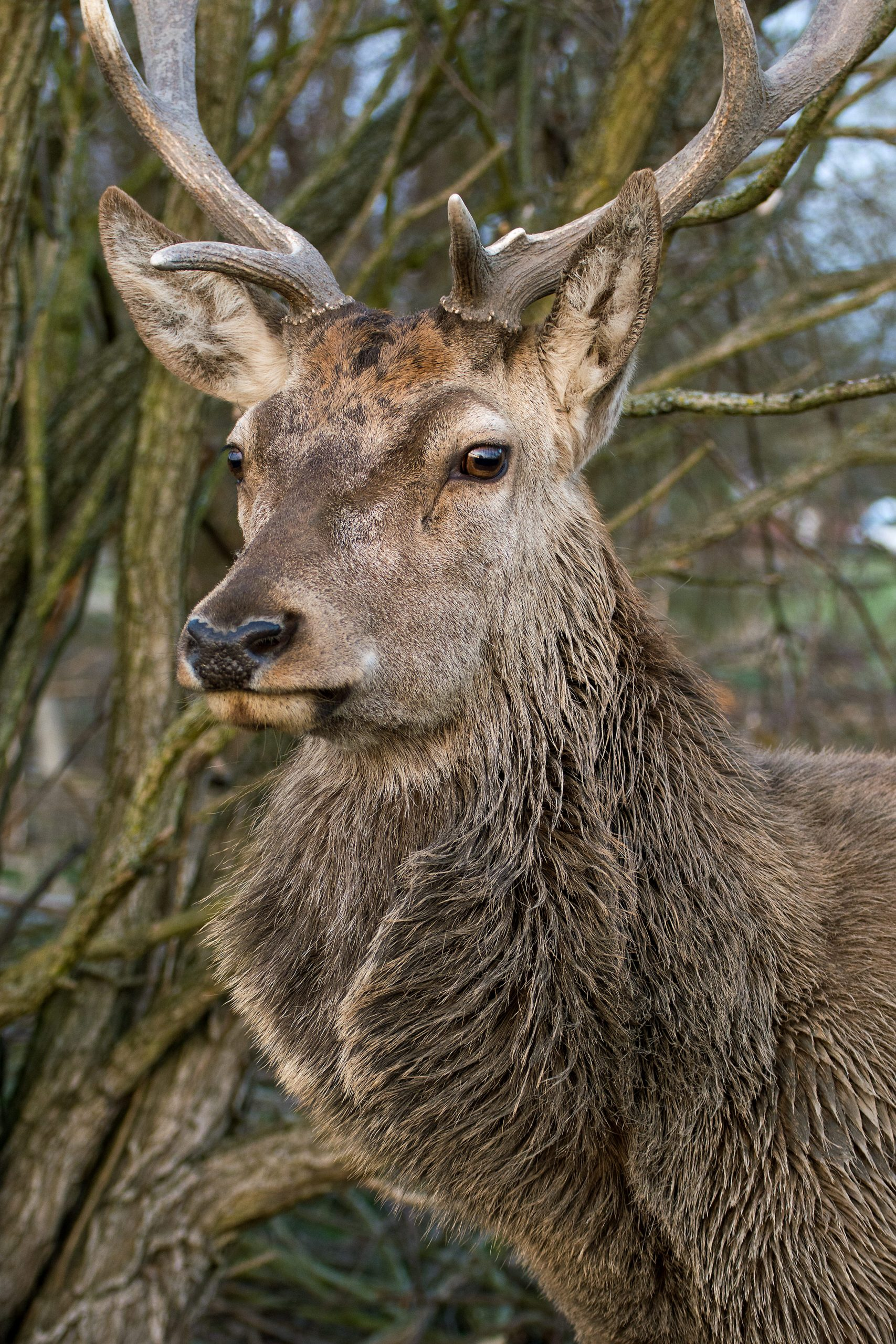
Red deer

=== Female-female competition ===
Female-female competition has been observed within harems in the red deer species (Cervus elaphus) prior to and during the mating season. Aggression is displayed through nose threats, kicking, and displacements. Elevated aggression has only been observed during the breeding season. Competition can be for access to mates or reproductive resources such as food, or nesting areas. Female-female aggression in ungulates is often overlooked because it is not as extravagant as male antler combat. Female conflicts occur so the winner has first access to the harem male at the start of the mating season before he is exhausted or low on sperm storage.

=== Secondary sexual traits ===
While an emphasis in observations of sexual selection is placed on combat using antlers, males with higher roaring rates are also being selected for. During the breeding season males will make calls to attract mates and compete with other males. Like antler size, mating call quality is an indicator of mate potential. Red deer can distinguish the calls of the males in their harem, others and their offspring.

=== Indirect benefits ===
Females select for males with larger antlers which indirectly benefits them. Large antler size in males is a sign of health and strength. The visual display is a reliable indicator of mate quality, providing indirect benefits. The females are not directly affected by these characteristics, but they will produce more viable and fit offspring. Males with large antlers mate and sire more offspring than smaller, younger males. Large antler size is correlated with overall health, fitness and an increase in sperm production and quality.
