= Cervus sivalensis =

Cervus sivalensis Temporal range: Pliocene to Pleistocene

Scientific classification
- Kingdom: Animalia
- Phylum: Chordata
- Class: Mammalia
- Order: Artiodactyla
- Family: Cervidae
- Genus: Cervus
- Species: †C. sivalensis

Binomial name
- †Cervus sivalensis Lydekker, 1876

Extinct species of deer

Cervus sivalensis is an extinct species of large sized deer that lived during Pliocene to Pleistocene of Sivalik Hills and Kashmir of Indian subcontinent.

== Discovery and naming ==
The holotype of Cervus sivalensis, GSI B215, was discovered by Richard Lydekker from Maili of Punjab, India. It was originally described as a specimen of Cervus triplidens, however due to its large size it was reclassified as its own species by 1886. The species name sivalensis is after the Sivalik Hills of Northern Indian subcontinent.
