= Rajparian Wildlife Sanctuary =

- IUCN category IV (habitat/species management area)
- Location within Jammu and Kashmir Location within India
- Interactive map of Rajparian Wildlife Sanctuary
- Location: Daksum, Forest Block, Anantnag district, Jammu and Kashmir, India
- Nearest city: Anantnag city
- Coordinates: 33°39′30″N 75°28′20″E
- Area: 20 km^{2} (7.7 sq mi)
- Established: 1981

Rajparian Wildlife Sanctuary is a protected area located in Daksum, Forest Block, near Anantnag city in Anantnag district of Jammu and Kashmir, India. It lies 42 km from Anantnag city, the district headquarter, 85 kilometres (53 mi) south of Srinagar. It spreads over an area of 20 square kilometres (7.7 mi^{2}). This area was protected as a game reserve for hangul during the Maharaja's period, prior to 1948. In 1981, it was upgraded to the Rajparian Wildlife Sanctuary.

== Flora and fauna ==
The vegetation types present in the Rajparian Wildlife Sanctuary include dense coniferous forests and sub-alpine pastures. In dense coniferous forests, kail pine, spruce, fir, birch, deodar and juniper trees are predominant.

The Rajparian Wildlife Sanctuary is abode to many species of animals including the Himalayan black bear, hangul, and musk deer. A number of species of wild birds are also found in the sanctuary.

== Disturbance ==
In 1970, the Government of Kashmir constructed a sheep breeding farm on 1300 hectares of prime wintering area of the now critically endangered hangul. This sheep breeding farm is believed to have had an adverse effect on the movement of hangul in this area. Besides, the sanctuary has also been disturbed due to excessive grazing by the livestock of non-local Bakarwals.
