= Tarim Basin deciduous forests and steppe =

Ecoregion in Xinjiang, China

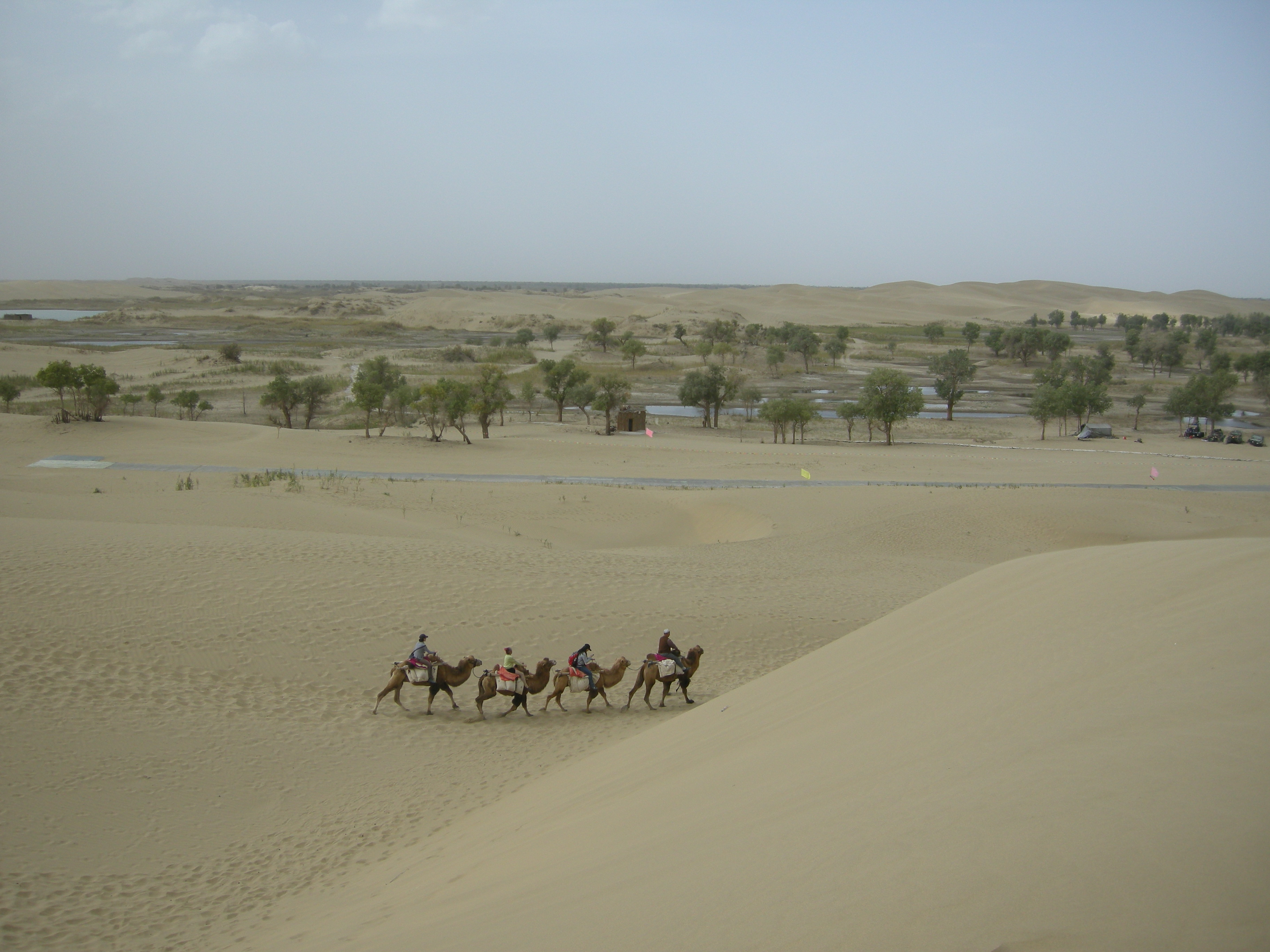
- Xinjiang Luoburencun Scenic Area

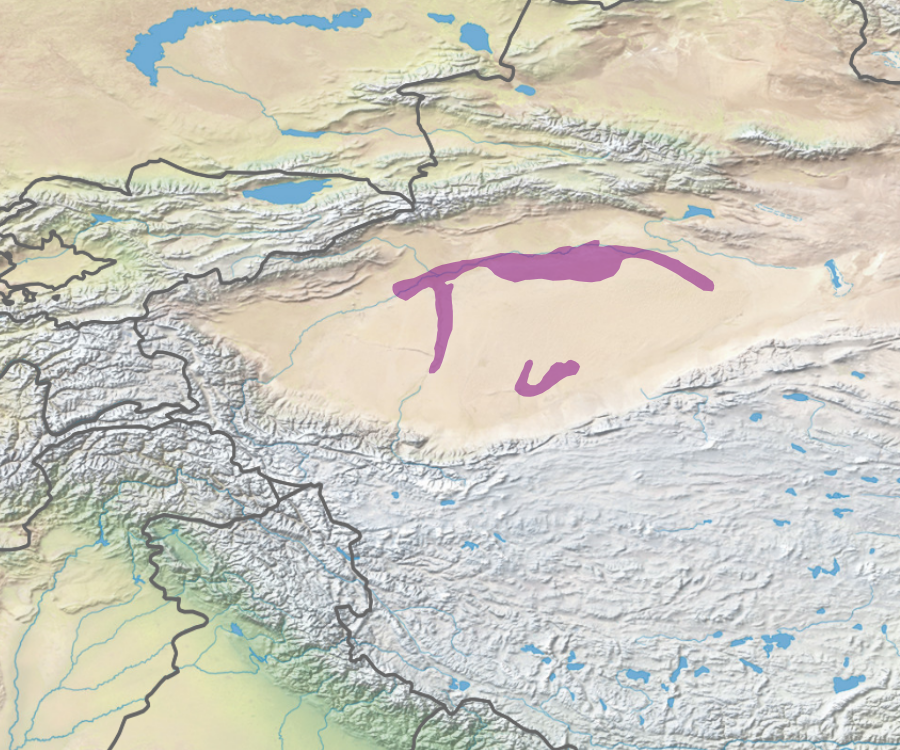
- Ecoregion territory (in purple)

Ecology
- Realm: Palearctic
- Biome: temperate broadleaf and mixed forests
- Borders: Taklimakan desert

Geography
- Area: 54,533 km^{2} (21,055 mi^{2})
- Countries: China
- Autonomous region: Xinjiang

Conservation
- Conservation status: Critical/endangered
- Protected: 4,051 km^{2} (7%)

The Tarim Basin deciduous forests and steppe is a temperate broadleaf and mixed forests ecoregion in the Xinjiang Uyghur Autonomous Region of western China. The ecoregion includes deciduous riparian forests and steppes sustained by the region's rivers in an otherwise arid region.

== Geography ==
The Tarim Basin is a desert basin lying in westernmost China. The basin is surrounded by high mountains – the Kunlun Mountains to the south, which form the northern edge of the Tibetan Plateau; the Pamir Mountains to the west; and the Tian Shan to the north.

The basin is arid, but the surrounding mountains receive considerable rainfall and snow. Rivers drain into the basin from the mountains, including the northward-flowing Hotan River, which drains the western Kunlun Mountains, the Yarkand River, which drains the Pamirs, and the Aksu River, which drains the western Tian Shan mountains. These rivers join to form the Tarim River, which flows for 1300 km in an arc across the northern and eastern basin. The Kongque River drains southeastwards from the central Tian Shan. The basin is endorheic, with no outlet to the sea, and Tarim River and Kongque rivers empty into a complex of salt lakes in the eastern portion of the basin. The lower Tarim River empties southeast into Taitema Lake in the southeastern basin, and the Kongque empties eastwards into Lop Nur. The Qarqan River rises in the central Kunlun Mountains and also empties northeastwards into Taitema Lake. Taitema Lake is approximately 800 meters above sea level.

Soils in the ecoregion are generally sandy loam.

== Climate ==
The basin has an arid continental climate. Average annual temperatures range from -20º C in the winter months to 40º C during the summer months. Rainfall averages only 50 mm per year on the floor of the basin. Annual precipitation in the surrounding mountains can exceed 1000 mm per year. The rivers are sustained by snowfall and glacial melt (about 60% of total flow) and by rainfall (about 40%). About 75% of the annual runoff comes in the months of July, August and September, creating a regular summer flood season.

== Flora ==
The natural vegetation includes wetland, riparian forest, and shrub communities. In seasonally and permanently-flooded areas there are reed swamps and wet meadows of Myricaria pulcherrima, Phragmites australis, and Calamagrostis pseudophragmites. The riparian forests, known as Tugay, are dominated by the deciduous desert poplar (Populus euphratica) on the lower river terraces, along with Elaeagnus angustifolia. The upper river terraces are home to drier forests and shrubby woodlands, with Tamarix ramosissima and Halostachys caspica along with Populus euphratica and salt-tolerant halophyte plants. Populus pruinosa occurs along the upper reaches of the rivers, but not in the lower basin.

== Fauna ==
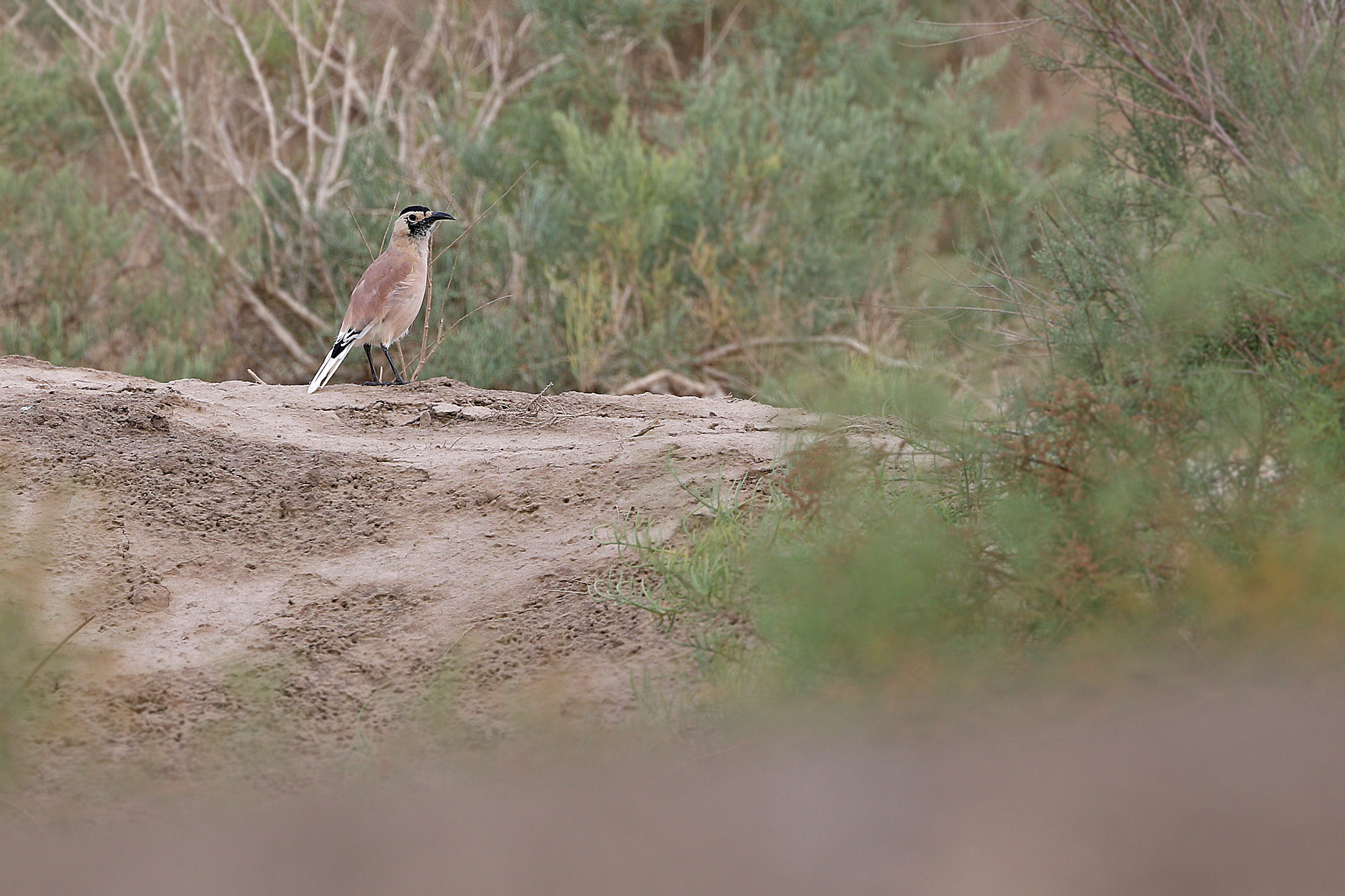
Xinjiang Ground-Jay

The forests and wetlands are important habitat for migratory and resident birds. The ecoregion is home to several mammal species, including Yarkand deer (Cervus elaphus yarkandensis). The Yarkand deer population declined from 10,000 individuals in the 1950s to less than 3000 in the 1990s.

== Conservation and threats ==
The Silk Road passes through the Tarim Basin, and the region's rivers have supported settled and nomadic people for centuries. Much of the river lowland has been converted to agriculture and pasture. Since the 1950s, the Chinese government has settled many people in the area from elsewhere in China, and the region's growing population accelerated conversion of habitat, draining wetlands, and diverting water for agriculture. Water diversion has both reduced flows in the river and lowered the groundwater table, endangering the forests.

Since 1921 the Tarim has been diverted via the Kongque into Lop Nur, and freshwater flows to the 320 km of the lower Tarim and Taitema Lake were much reduced. Construction of Daxihaizi Dam in 1972 mostly eliminated freshwater flows into the lower Tarim. Most of the forest died off, and wildlife, including wild camels, was decimated. In 2000, the government started regular water releases from the upstream dams into the lower Tarim, which allowed the forests, wildlife, and groundwater to recover somewhat.

=== Protected areas ===
A 2017 assessment found that 4,051 km^{2}, or 7%, of the ecoregion is in protected areas. Very little habitat remains outside protected areas. Tarim Huyanglin Nature Reserve, established in 1983, protects the largest remaining block of habitat on the Tarim River, including an un-dyked stretch of river in the western portion of the reserve where natural river processes still prevail.
