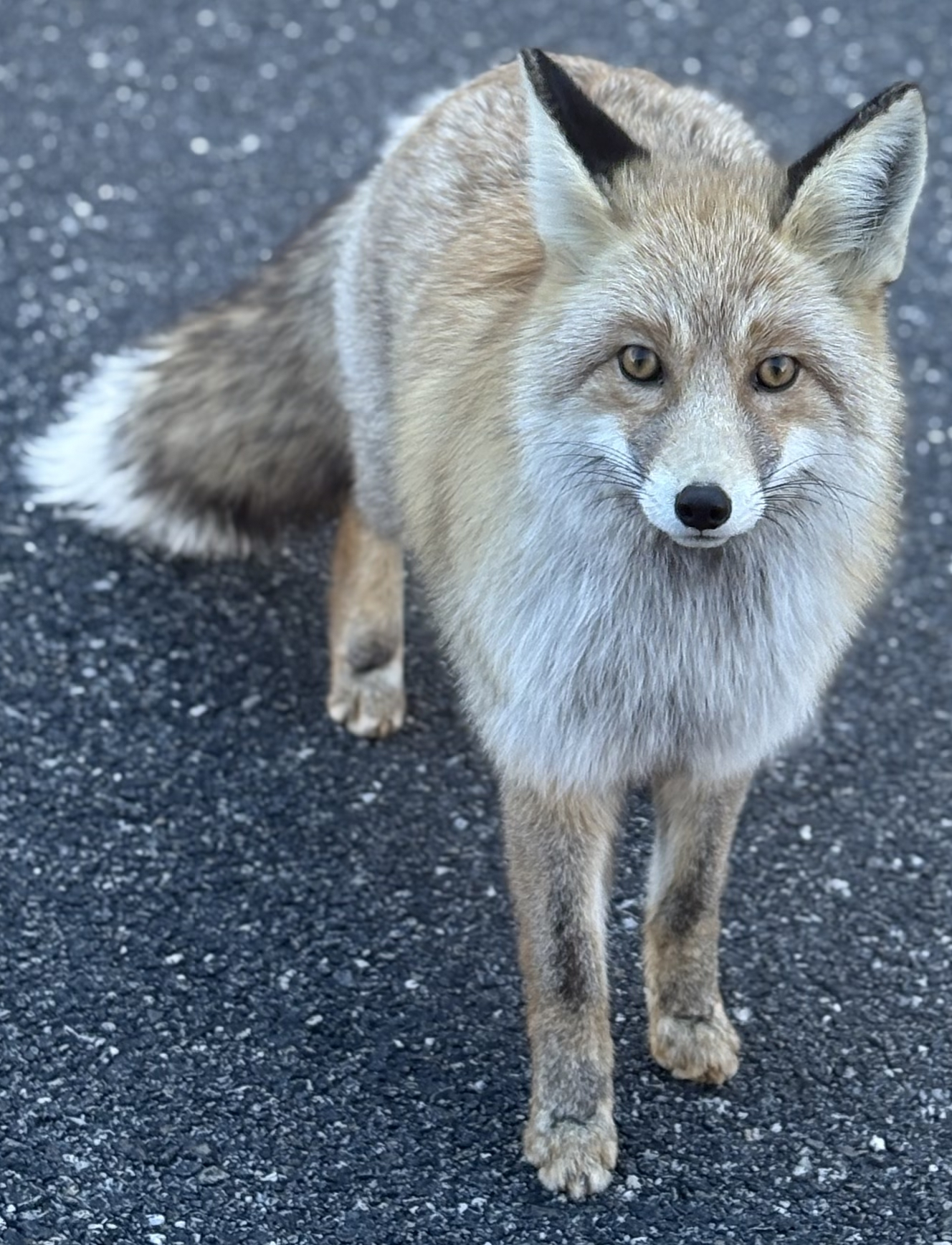
- Fox in Ladakh

Conservation status
- CITES Appendix III

Scientific classification
- Kingdom: Animalia
- Phylum: Chordata
- Class: Mammalia
- Order: Carnivora
- Family: Canidae
- Genus: Vulpes
- Species: V. vulpes
- Subspecies: V. v. montana

Trinomial name
- Vulpes vulpes montana Pearson, 1836

Synonyms
- Vulpes vulpes nepalensis J. E. Gray, 1837; Vulpes vulpes himalaicus Ogilby, 1837; Vulpes vulpes alopex Blanford, 1888; Vulpes vulpes waddelli Bonhote, 1906; Vulpes vulpes ladacensis Matschie, 1907

= Himalayan red fox =

Subspecies of red fox

The Himalayan red fox (Vulpes vulpes montana) is a subspecies of the red fox that is native to parts of the Himalayan Mountain Range and the Karakoram Mountain Range. Its natural range is made up of rocky terrain, low grasslands, and tundra within a temperate climate, although it is occasionally known to build dens near urbanized human areas.

== Distribution ==
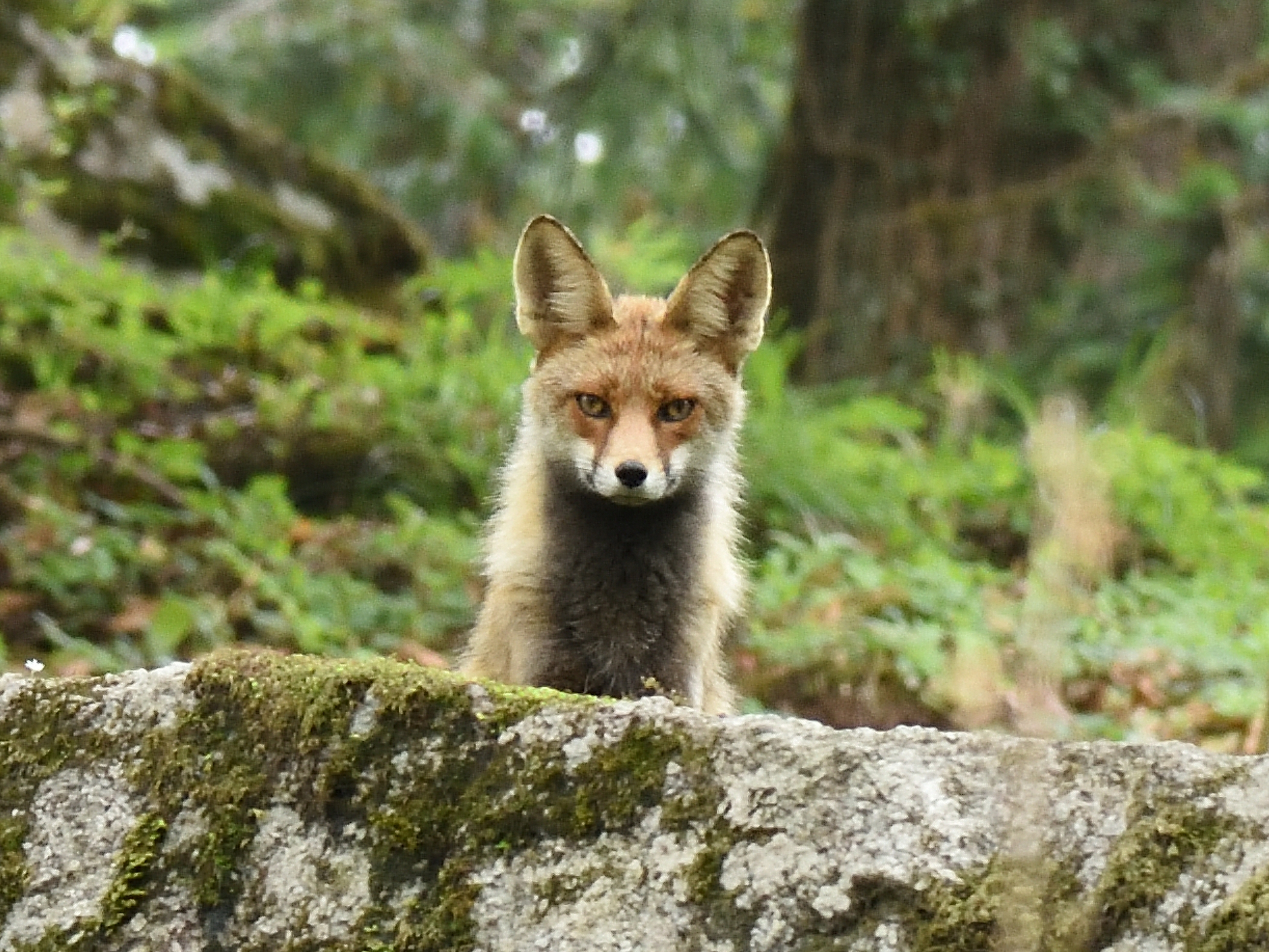
Fox in Uttarakhand, India

The Himalayan red fox has two notable populations: one is in northeastern India, far southern Nepal, and far northern Bangladesh; the other is in portions of far northwestern India, and northeastern Pakistan. Populations may also be present in far southwestern China, and in other areas of the Himalayas.

Researchers also found Himalayan red foxes in the Shigar valley of the Karakorum Range, Pakistan and studied their living habits and den locations there. These studies showed that in their resting state 83.33% of the hill foxes had a den in a grass/bare habitat.

== Characteristics ==
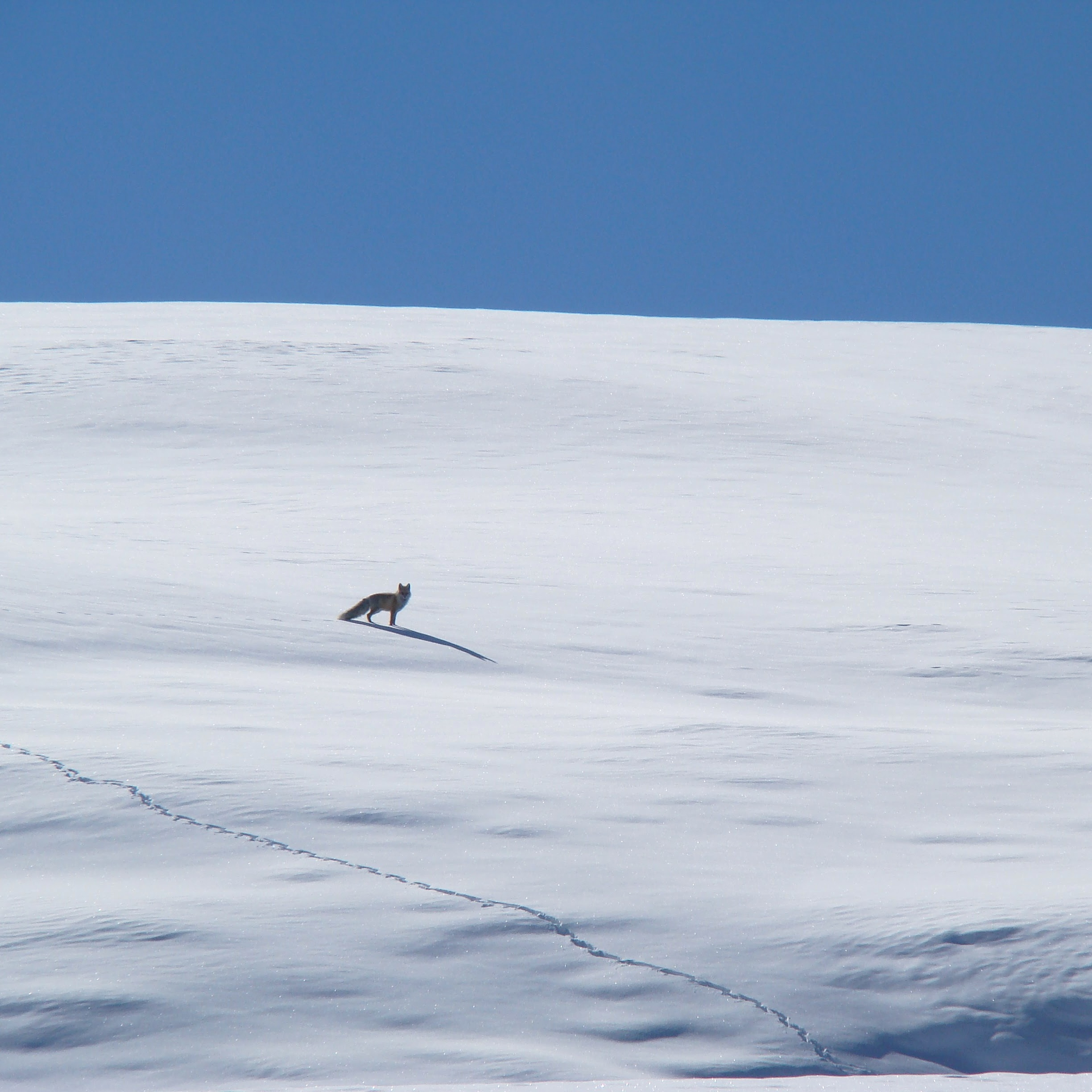
Fox in deep snow in Kibber Wildlife Sanctuary, Himachal Pradesh, India

The Himalayan red fox is differentiated from the nominate subspecies by having a smaller body, smaller skull and teeth, and by having rough or coarse hair. Its foot hair is mixed with softer, woolly hair.

Many Himalayan red foxes are high altitude animals, and genetic studies have been done in order to understand the evolution of their adaptive mechanisms for high-altitude habitats. Other studies have shown that "many high-altitude animals reduce O₂ demand by suppressing total metabolism to compensate for a reduced cellular O₂ supply as a response to hypoxia". One study used "blood samples obtained from a wild female red fox captured from Lhasa in Tibet, China". With an average elevation of over 3500 m, the Qinghai-Tibet Plateau is the highest plateau in the world, and by analyzing the sequences of this red fox's genes researchers in this study found a gene that corresponds to these foxes' ability to adapt to their environments.
