= Dachigam National Park =

National park in Jammu and Kashmir

Dachigam National Park, Srinagar
- IUCN category II (national park)
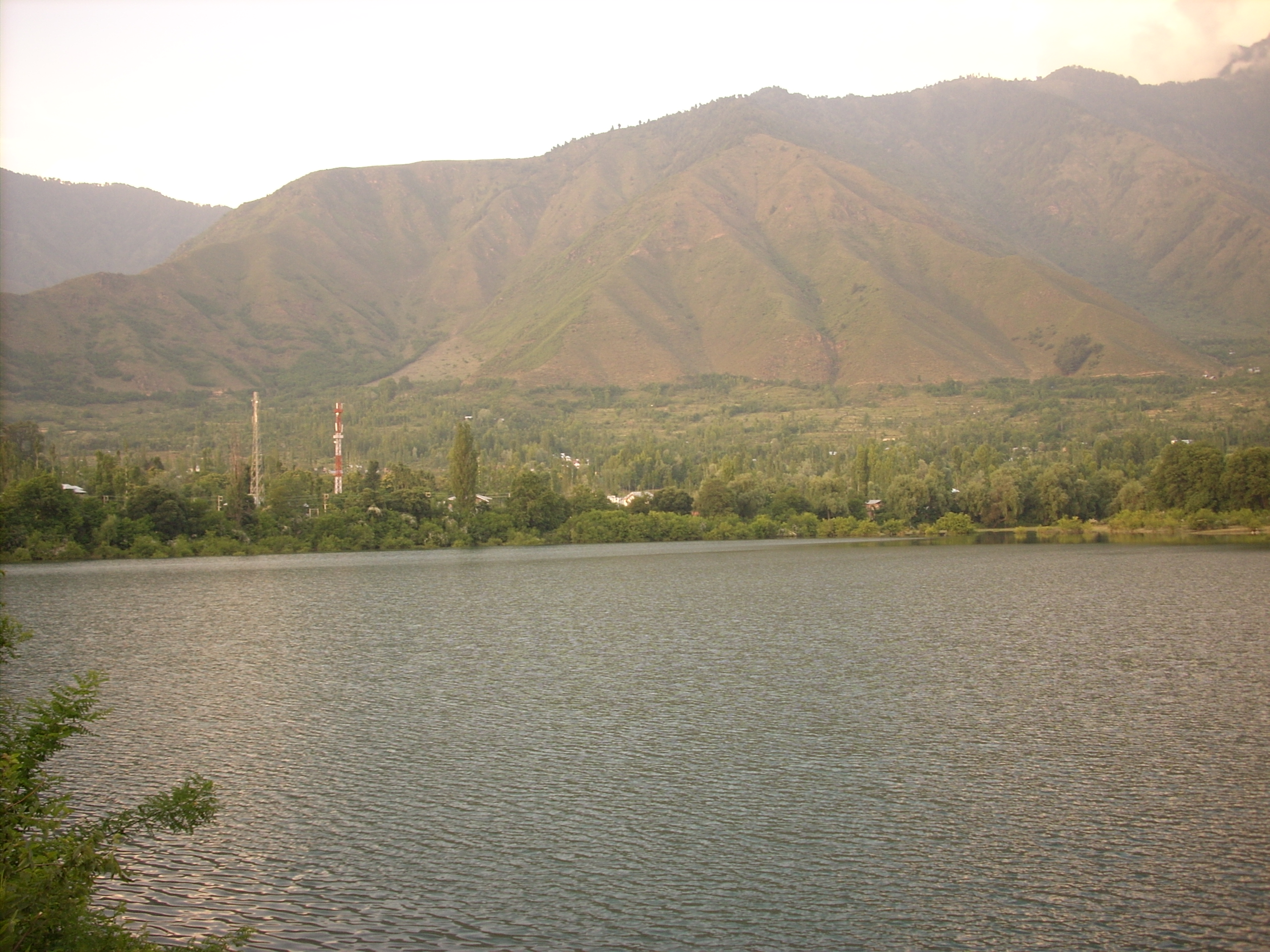
- Sarband water body with Dachigam National Park in Srinagar district, J&K, India.

- Location within Jammu and Kashmir Location within India
- Interactive map of Dachigam National Park, Srinagar
- Location: Dachigam, Srinagar district, Jammu and Kashmir, India
- Nearest city: Srinagar
- Coordinates: 34°8′14″N 75°2′16″E
- Area: 141 km^{2} (54 sq mi)
- Max. elevation: 4267 m (14,000 ft)
- Min. elevation: 1676 m (5,499 ft)
- Established: 1981
- Governing body: Government of Jammu and Kashmir, India

Dachigam National Park is a national park located 22 kilometres (14 mi) from Srinagar city in Srinagar district in Kashmir on the east side of Dal Lake in the Indian union territory of Jammu and Kashmir. It covers an area of about 141 square kilometres (54 sq mi). The name of the park means "ten villages", in memory of the ten villages that were relocated for the park's formation. These ten villages were living in this region before World War I at the beginning of the 20th century. The main gate entrance is very close to the New Theed general bus stand, on either side of Darul Uloom Kousaria.

The park has been a protected area since 1910, first under the care of the Maharaja of Jammu and Kashmir and later under the observation of the concerned government authorities. It was initially created to ensure a supply of clean drinking water for Srinagar. It was upgraded and declared a National Park in 1981.

== Geography ==
Dachigam National Park is located in the Zabarwan Range of the western Himalayas. The variation in altitude is vast, ranging from about 1600 m to 4200 m above mean sea level. Due to this vast variation, the park has uneven topography. The terrain ranges from gently sloping grasslands to sharp rocky outcrops and cliffs.

Located high among the Park interior is the Marsar lake from which flows the Dagwan river. This river flows down to, and past, the lower region where it runs along the only proper road in the park. It supplies water to the Sarband reservoir, a source of drinking water to Srinagar. The Dagwan eventually flows into the Jhelum.

== Flora ==
The mountainsides below the tree line are wooded. Most of this coniferous forest consists of broadleaf species. Interspersed between these are alpine pastures, meadows, waterfalls, and scrub vegetation with deep gullies, locally known as Nars, running down the mountain face. Most of the grasslands and meadows, except in the harsh winters, are covered with coloured flowers.

== Fauna ==
The main animal species that Dachigam is known for is the hangul, or the Kashmir stag. Other species include:

- Musk deer (roose kat)
- Snow Leopard
- Himalayan serow
- Kashmir stag (hangul)
- Leopard cat (nt)
- Himalayan black bear (vu)
- Himalayan brown bear
- Jackal
- Hill fox
- Himalayan weasel
- Yellow-throated marten
- Jungle cat
- Long-tailed marmot
- Otter

=== Birds ===
- Cinnamon sparrow
- Black bulbul
- Himalayan monal
- Golden oriole
- Minivet
- Pygmy owlet
- Woodpecker
- Babbler
- Redstart
- Wagtail
- Koklass pheasant
- Chough
- Orange bullfinch
- Kashmir flycatcher
- Tytler's leaf warbler
- Streaked laughingthrush
- Himalayan rubythroat
- Wallcreeper
- Black-and-yellow grosbeak
- Himalayan griffon vulture
- Bearded vulture
- Red-billed blue magpie
- Titmouse

Introduced, non-native fish population of trout is found in the Dagwan River.

== See also ==
- Overa-Aru Wildlife Sanctuary
- Hirpora Wildlife Sanctuary
- Gulmarg Wildlife Sanctuary
