= Agustín Stahl =

Puerto Rican medical doctor, and scientist (1842–1917)

Agustín Stahl Stamm
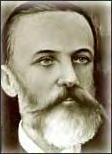
- Born: January 21, 1842; Curaçao
- Died: July 12, 1917 (aged 75); Bayamón, Puerto Rico
- Education: Charles University in Prague (MD)
- Occupations: Medical doctor, scientist

Notes
- Dr. Stahl has a genus, Stahlia, and five valid species, Argythamnia stahlii, Senna pendula var. stahlii , Eugenia stahlii, Lyonia stahlii, and Ternstroemia stahlii, named in his honor.

Agustín Stahl (January 21, 1842 – July 12, 1917) was a Puerto Rican medical doctor and scientist with diverse interests in the fields of ethnology, botany, and zoology. He advocated Puerto Rico's independence from Spain.

== Early years ==
Stahl was born in Curaçao, and given the name Antón Adolf August by his parents, Johann Heinrich Christian Stahl and Maria Helene Stamm. They moved to Aguadilla, Puerto Rico when he was a year old.

Born into a German Protestant family, he was baptized into the Roman Catholic faith at about three years of age in Aguadilla, the town in which he also received his primary and secondary education.

He studied at the universities of Würzburg in Germany and at the Charles University in Prague, graduating from the latter with the title of Doctor of Medicine in 1864. After graduation, Stahl returned to Puerto Rico, where he established his medical practice in the city of Bayamón.

== Ethnologist, botanist and zoologist ==
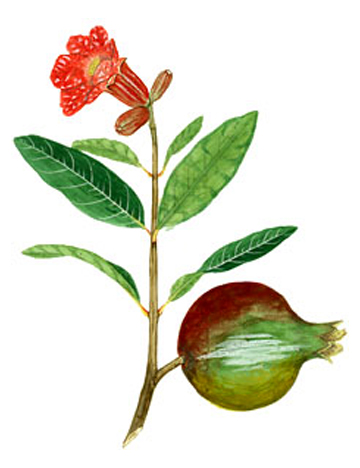
Dr. Agustín Stahl watercolor of Punica granatum.

Outside work, Stahl's love of nature lead him to conduct investigations and experiments in the fields of ethnology, botany and zoology. He also had a love of history and historical investigation. Stahl's investigations in enthology, botany, and zoology were recognized with awards from the Spanish anthropological society; Academy of Sciences and arts of Barcelona and Catalonia Medical Sciences Academy.

Stahl wrote Estudios sobre la flora de Puerto Rico ("A study of the Puerto Rican Flora"), published in six fascicles from 1883 to 1888. Copies of Stahl's plant collection with approximately 1,330 plants can be found in various botanical gardens around the world. His collections were the basis for numerous studies by specialists, some of them resulting in new taxa to science.

Stahl has a genus, Stahlia, and five valid species, Argythamnia stahlii, Senna pendula var. stahlii, Eugenia stahlii, Lyonia stahlii, and Ternstroemia stahlii, named in his honor. The genus Stahlia is represented by a single species, S. monosperma (Tul.) Urb., known to occur only in Puerto Rico and the eastern Dominican Republic. Known in Puerto Rico as cóbana negra, this species is currently listed as threatened in the USFW Federal Register, April 5, 1990.

He was quoted as saying:

"I love science. We wouldn't be where we are without science"

== Written works ==
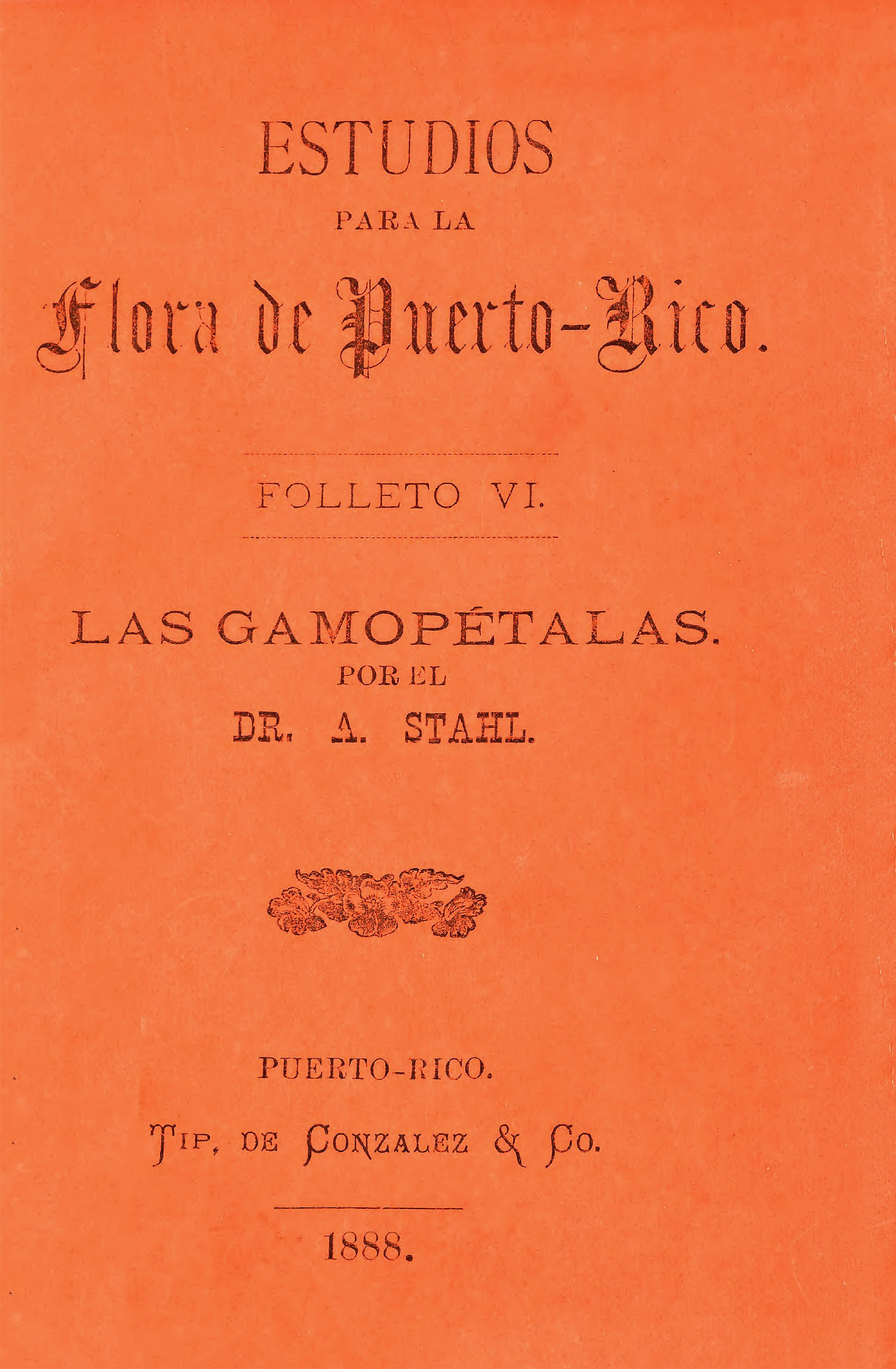
Notes on Puerto Rico's Flora (Part 6), by Agustín Stahl

Stahl's written works include:

- Notes on Puerto Rico's Flora
- Report on the Disease of the Sugar Cane
- Puerto Rican Flora
- The Puerto Rican Indians (Tainos)
- The Founding of Aguadilla
- The Founding of Bayamón

== Later years ==
The custom of decorating Christmas trees in Puerto Rico began in the city of Bayamón in 1866, when Stahl adorned a tree in his backyard. The people of Bayamón baptized his tree "El árbol de Navidad del Doctor Stahl" ("Dr. Stahl's Christmas tree").

Stahl was a firm believer that Puerto Rico should obtain independence from Spain, and was a member of the Puerto Rican Autonomist Party. This group sought to create a separate political and legal identity for Puerto Rico while emulating Spain in all political matters. However, due to Stahl's political views, he was expelled from his position in the Civil Institute of Natural Sciences in Spain and was deported in 1898.

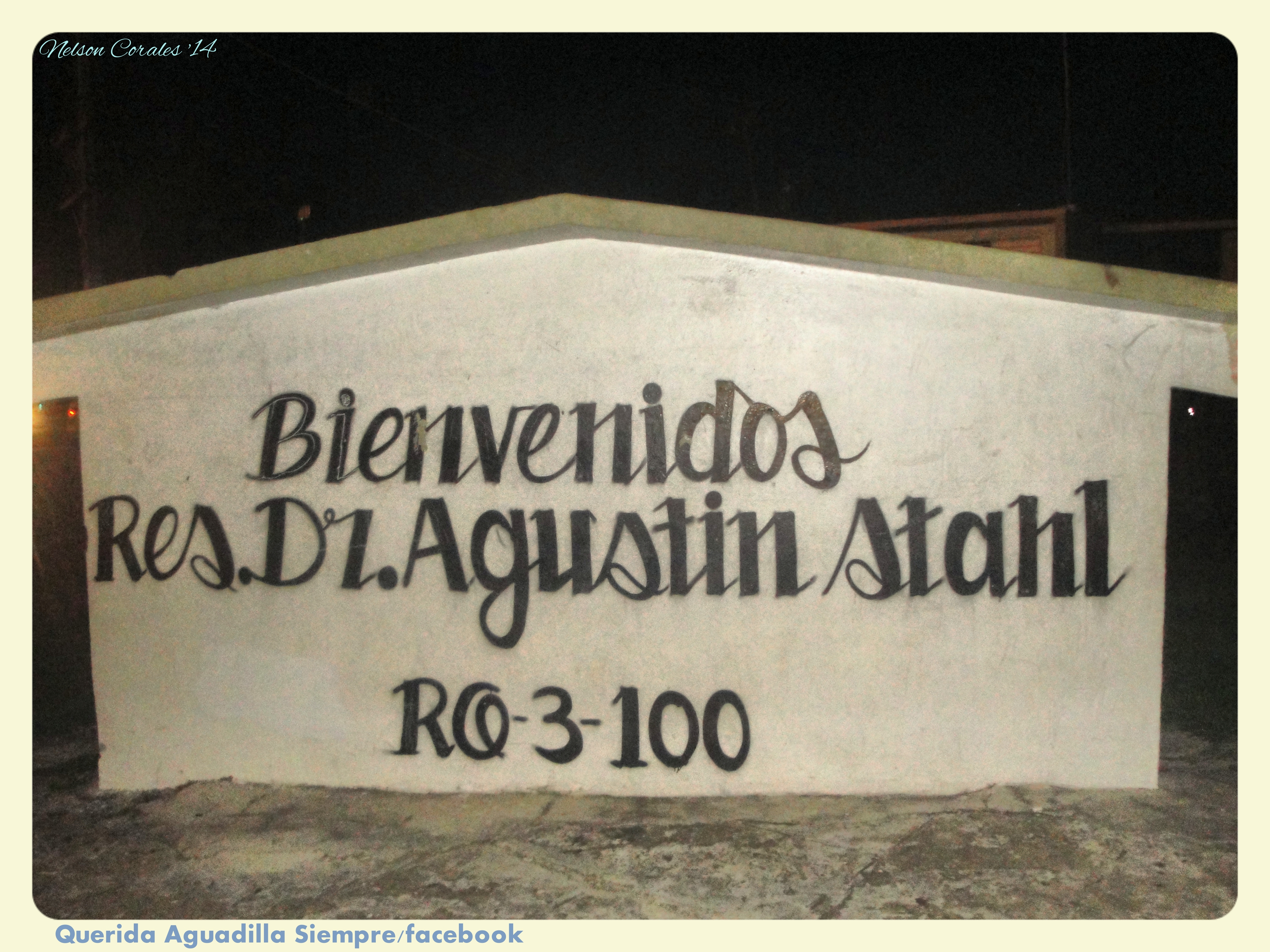
A sector of Borinquen barrio in Aguadilla, Puerto Rico is named after Agustín Stahl.

Stahl died in the city of Bayamón, and his remains are buried in the city's Braulio Dueño Colón Municipal Cemetery. The city of Bayamón turned his former house into a museum to be enjoyed by all those who wish to learn more about him and his work. Puerto Rican sculptor Tomás Batista created a bust to honor Stahl, which can be found at the University of Puerto Rico, Cayey.

== See also ==
- List of Puerto Ricans
- Puerto Rican scientists and inventors
- German immigration to Puerto Rico
- Dr. Agustín Stahl Stamm House
