= Leopard tree =

Leopard tree is a common name for several plants and may refer to:

- Libidibia ferrea, a leguminous tree found in South America
- Flindersia maculosa, an Australian tree of the citrus family
