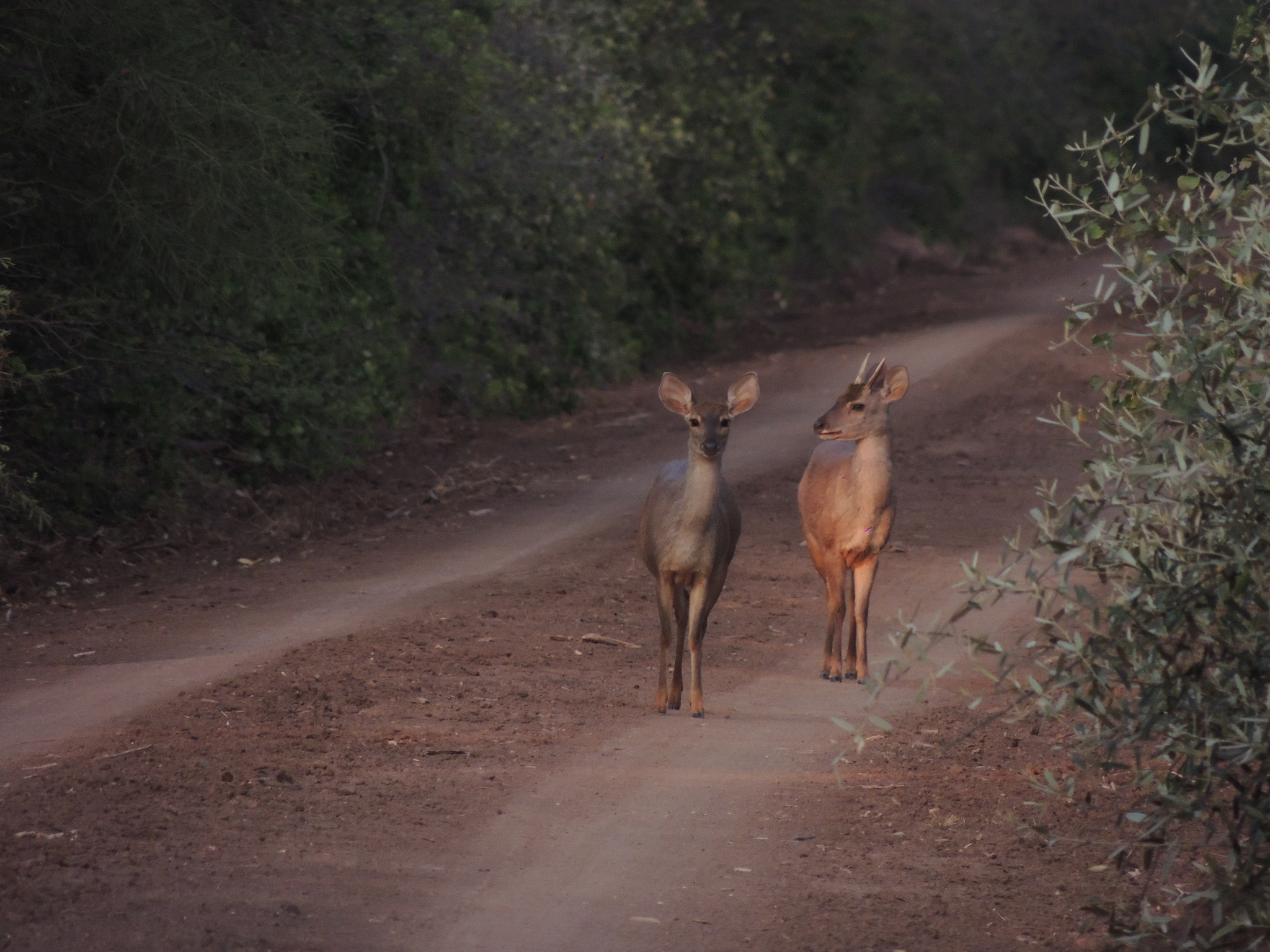
- Subulo gouazoubira

Scientific classification
- Kingdom: Animalia
- Phylum: Chordata
- Class: Mammalia
- Order: Artiodactyla
- Family: Cervidae
- Subfamily: Capreolinae
- Tribe: Odocoileini
- Genus: Subulo; Smith, 1827

Type species
- Cervus (Subulo) simplicicornis Smith, 1827

Species
- Subulo gouazoubira Subulo chunyi

= Subulo =

Genus of deer

Subulo is a genus of South American deer including two species formerly classified in the genus Mazama. These two species are the gray brocket (Subulo gouazoubira) and the dwarf brocket (S. chunyi). The taxonomy of brocket deer has been controversial, with recent molecular studies finding Mazama to be polyphyletic, with Subulo being more related to other South American genera such as Ozotoceros, Blastocerus, and Hippocamelus. Subulo Smith, 1827 was resurrected by Bernegossi et al. in 2023 with a neotype due to a lack of a proper holotype.
