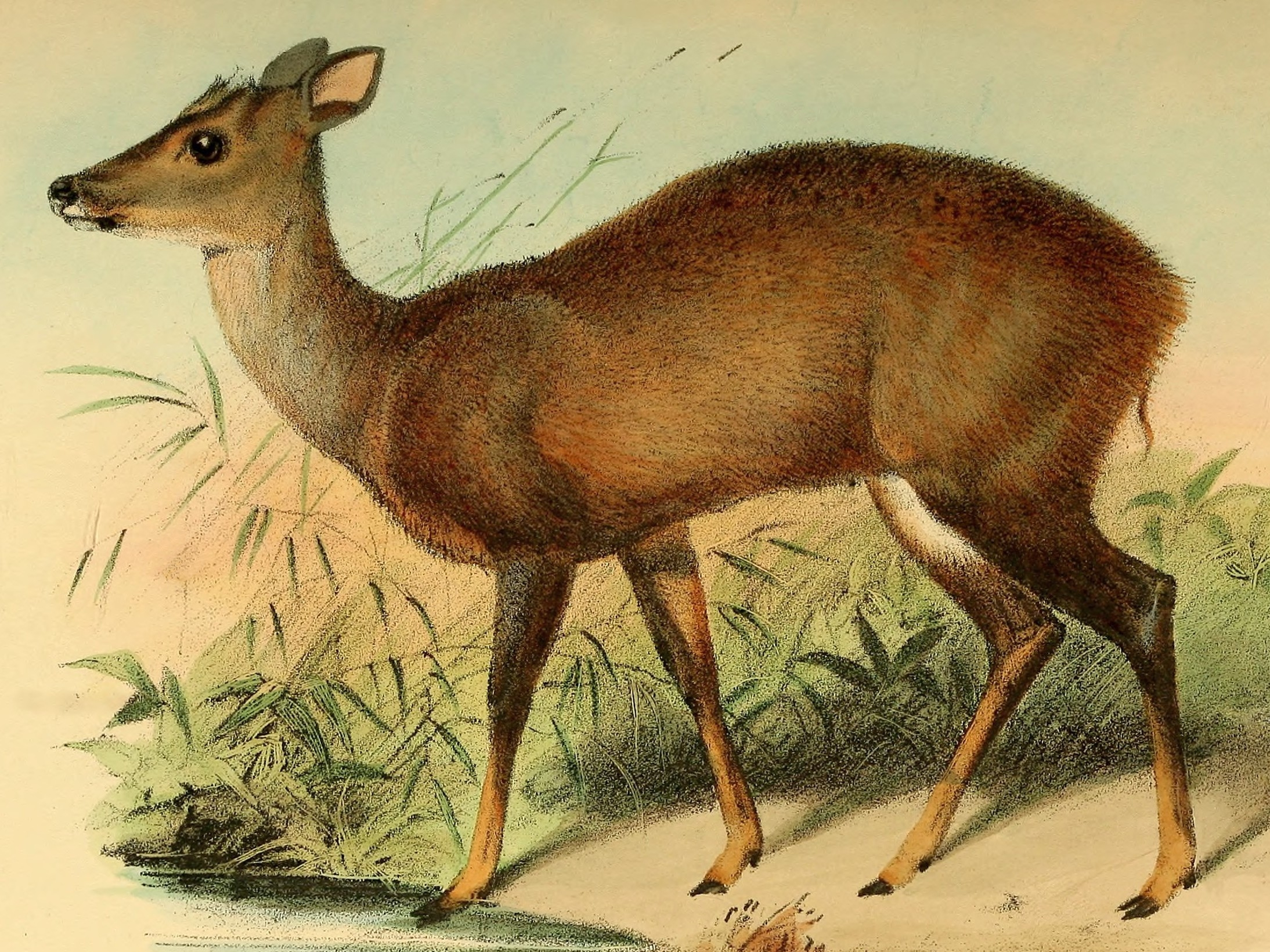

Conservation status
- Least Concern (IUCN 3.1)

Scientific classification
- Kingdom: Animalia
- Phylum: Chordata
- Class: Mammalia
- Order: Artiodactyla
- Family: Cervidae
- Subfamily: Capreolinae
- Tribe: Odocoileini
- Genus: Passalites
- Species: P. nemorivagus

Binomial name
- Passalites nemorivagus (F. Cuvier, 1817)
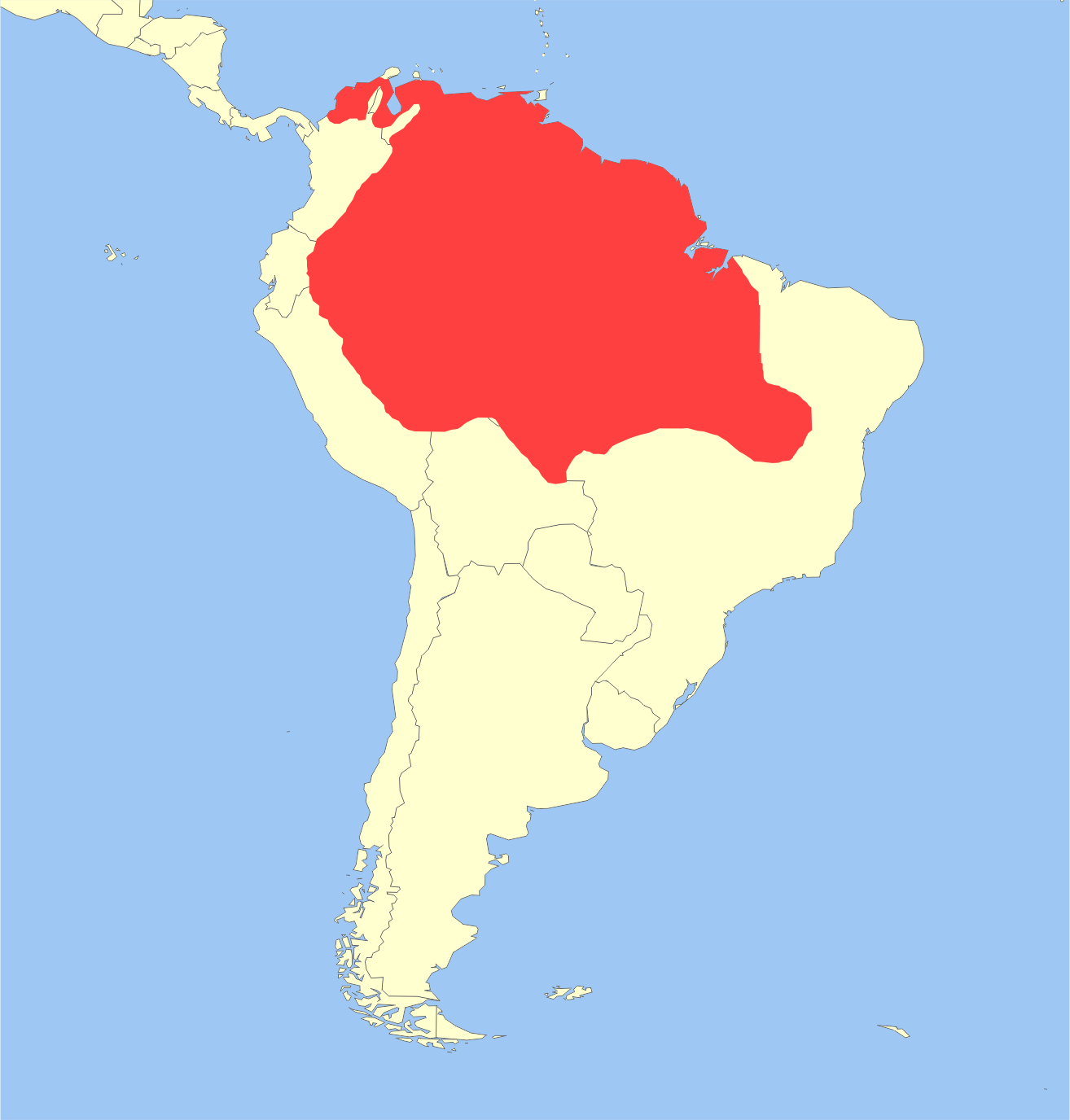

Synonyms
- Passalites tienhoveni Roosmalen, 2015

= Amazonian brown brocket =

Species of deer

The Amazonian brown brocket (Passalites nemorivagus), also known as the small brown brocket, is a small species of deer that is almost entirely restricted to South America.

== Distribution and habitat ==
It is known from Panama (in Isla San José of the Pearl Islands only; endemic subspecies M. n. permira), Colombia, Venezuela, Guyana, Suriname, French Guiana, eastern Ecuador, eastern Peru, Brazil and possibly northern Bolivia. Habitats it is found in include primarily nonflooded Amazonian tropical rainforest, and locally also tropical deciduous forest and xeric shrublands, at altitudes up to 1,500 metres (4,900 ft). However, reports from the latter habitats may actually represent M. gouazoubira.

== Breeding ==
Breeding occurs year-round in some areas, with births tending to be concentrated in the rainy season.

== Threats ==
It is threatened by deforestation and by diseases spread by cattle, but not particularly by hunting.

== Taxonomy ==
It is sympatric with the larger M. americana over much of its range (the latter tends to have significantly higher population densities), and reportedly also with M. gouazoubira in a few areas. It was considered a subspecies of M. gouazoubira, with which it is parapatric, until 2000. Under normal viewing conditions it is not easily distinguished from M. gouazoubira, but unlike M. americana it is gray-brown overall with paler underparts.

In 2015, the fair brocket (Passalites tienhoveni), also known as the white brocket deer or veado branco to locals, was described from the south-central Amazon near the Aripuanã River in Brazil. The coloration was characterized by an overall light brown, grading toward almost white on the sides and ventrally, in contrast to the dorsal parts of M. americana, which are of a deep reddish-brown color, grading ventrally into a more rusty color, and those of M. nemorivaga which are dull or pale yellowish or grayish brown to chestnut brown, grading ventrally into yellowish or whitish. It is now considered a synonym

== Hybrids ==
The occurrence of hybrids with Subulo gouazoubira are documented.
