= Dr. Agustín Stahl Stamm House =

Historic residence in Bayamón, Puerto Rico

- Casa Dr. Agustín Stahl Stamm
- U.S. National Register of Historic Places
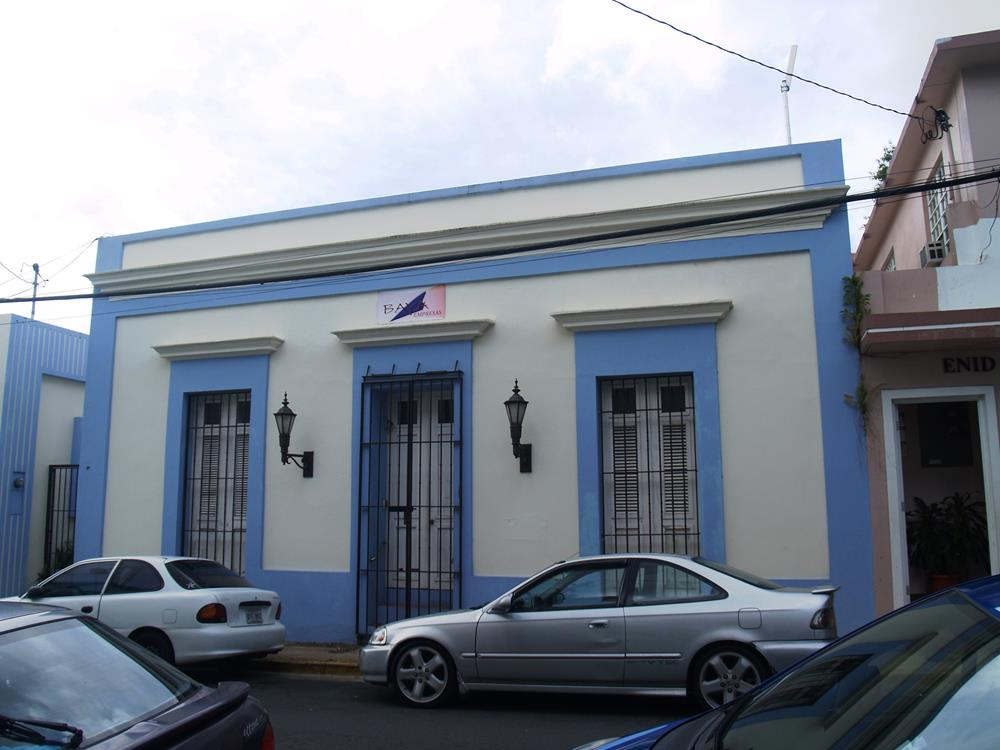
- The Stahl House in 2015

- Location within Puerto Rico
- Location: 14 José Martí Street; Bayamón, Puerto Rico
- Coordinates: 18°23′56″N 66°09′19″W
- Area: 234 m^{2} (2,520 sq ft)
- Built: 1840s
- Architectural style: Neoclassical
- NRHP reference No.: 10001216
- Added to NRHP: February 4, 2011

The Dr. Agustín Stahl Stamm House (Spanish: Casa Dr. Agustín Stahl Stamm) is a historic residence in Bayamón, Puerto Rico. Built in the 1840s, this Neoclassical house was the residence of internationally recognized Puerto Rican scientist Agustín Stahl (1842–1917) (Note: The Stahl House's National Register of Historic Places nomination form gives a birth date of 1841 for Agustín Stahl, while most other references, such as the Smithsonian Institution, state 1842.) from 1865 until his death. The house was not only his home, but also his medical office, laboratory, and storehouse for his collections in natural history and anthropology. (Note: After Stahl's death, his botanical collections were dispersed to numerous prominent institutions in the United States and Europe, and his anthropological collections were lost.) The house has been acquired and partially restored by the municipal government of Bayamón, which has long-term plans to establish a museum in the building.

Trained as a physician in Germany and maintaining only a modest income as a local doctor, Stahl nevertheless received honors in anthropology, natural sciences, and medicine by 1877. In the late 1870s, he entered the agricultural sciences in response to a sugarcane plague in Puerto Rico. In the 1880s, he published massive and well regarded reference texts on the zoology and botany of the island, and later important works in ethnology and demography. In the latter part of his life, he became a leader in public health efforts in Puerto Rico and published works in Puerto Rican history.

Stahl is also remembered for his advocacy of Puerto Rican independence. His liberal political views led to suspicion from Spanish colonial authorities and his arrest and brief exile to the Dominican Republic during the Spanish–American War.

The house was added to the U.S. National Register of Historic Places in 2011.

== See also ==
- National Register of Historic Places listings in Bayamón, Puerto Rico
