= Reaction wood =

Common defected wood

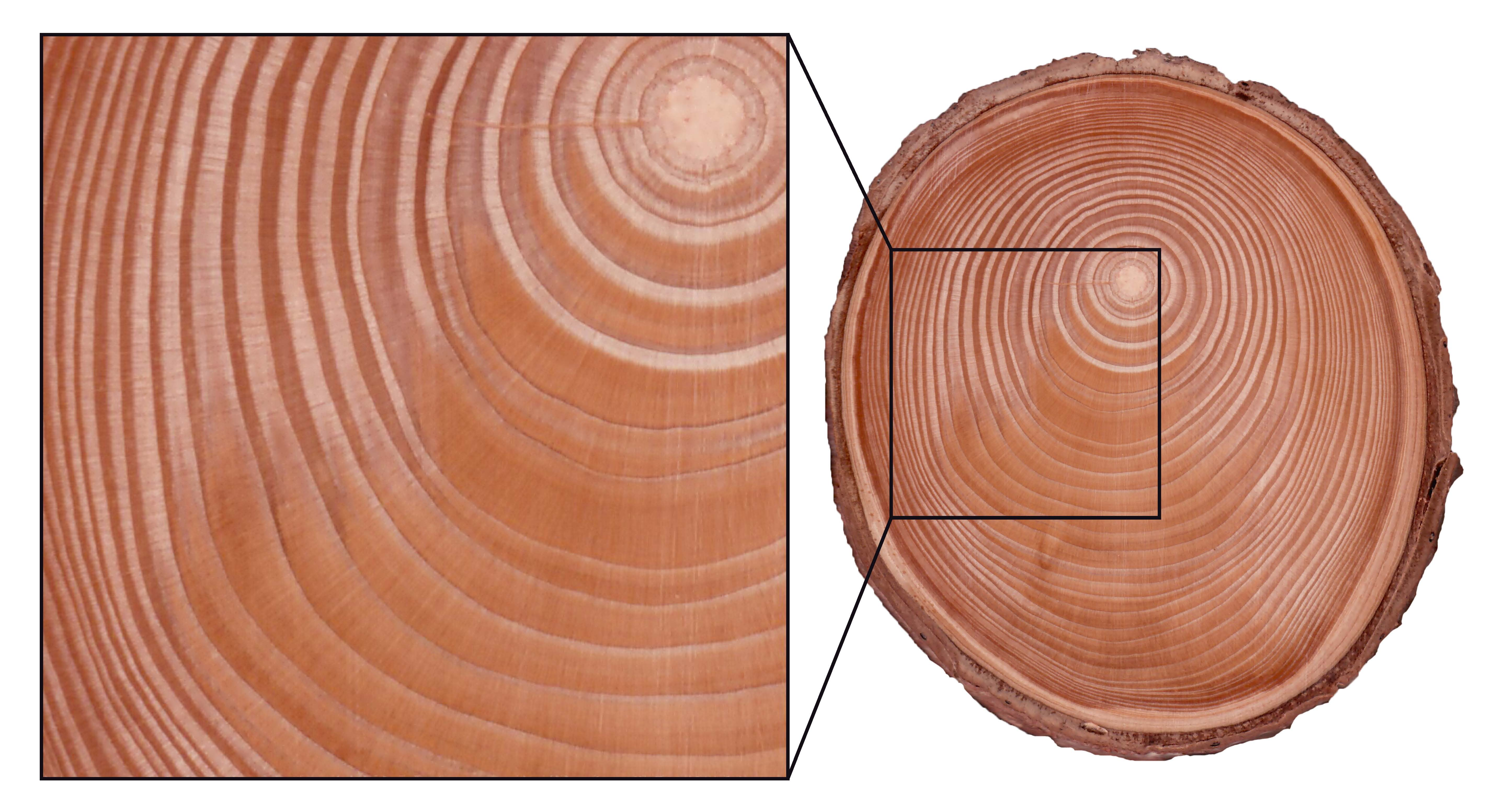
Cross section of a spruce branch (Picea abies), image section: compression wood (bottom right), normal wood (top left)

Reaction wood in a woody plant is wood that forms in place of normal wood as a response to gravity, where the cambial cells are oriented other than vertically. It is typically found on branches and leaning stems. It is an example of mechanical acclimation in trees.

Progressive bending and cracking would occur in parts of the tree undergoing predominantly tensile or compressive stresses were it not for the localised production of reaction wood, which differs from ordinary wood in its mechanical properties. Reaction wood may be laid down in wider than normal annual increments, so that the cross section is often asymmetric or elliptical. The structure of cells and vessels is also different, resulting in additional strength. The effect of reaction wood is to help maintain the angle of the bent or leaning part by resisting further downward bending or failure.

There are two different types of reaction wood, which represent two different approaches to the same problem by woody plants:

- In most angiosperms reaction wood is called tension wood. Tension wood forms on the side of the part of the plant that is under tension, pulling it towards the affecting force (upwards, in the case of a branch). It has a higher proportion of cellulose than normal wood. Tension wood may have as high as 60% cellulose.
- In gymnosperms and amborella it is called compression wood. Compression wood forms on the side of the plant that is under compression, thereby lengthening/straightening the bend. Compression wood has a higher proportion of lignin than normal wood. Compression wood has only about 30% cellulose compared to 42% in normal softwood. Its lignin content can be as high as 40%.

The controlling factor behind reaction wood appears to be the hormone auxin, although the exact mechanism is not clear. In a leaning stem, the normal flow of auxin down the tree is displaced by gravity and it accumulates on the lower side. The formation of reaction wood may act in conjunction with other corrective or adaptive mechanisms in woody plants, such as thigomorphism (adaptive response to flexure) and gravitropism (the correction of, rather than the support of, lean) and the auxin-controlled balance of growth rates and growth direction between stems and branches. The term ‘adaptive growth' therefore includes, but is not synonymous with, the formation of reaction wood.

As a rule, reaction wood is undesirable in any structural application, primarily as its mechanical properties are different from normal wood: it alters the uniform structural properties of timber. Reaction wood can twist, cup or warp dramatically during machining. This movement can occur during the milling process, making it occasionally dangerous to perform certain operations without appropriate safety controls in place. For instance, ripping a piece of reaction wood on a table saw without a splitter or riving knife installed can lead to kick back of the stock. Reaction wood also responds to moisture differently from normal wood.

Traditionally, compression wood does have niche applications. For instance, hunters in north Eurasia and the American Arctic were known to harvest compression wood for bow staves, because the increased density and compression strength of this wood enabled them to make functional weapons out of tree species that would otherwise be unsuitable for this purpose, due to their low strength and low density.

== See also ==
- Divi-divi
- Krummholz
- Windthrow
