= Krummholz =

Stunted vegetation in subarctic/subalpine tree lines

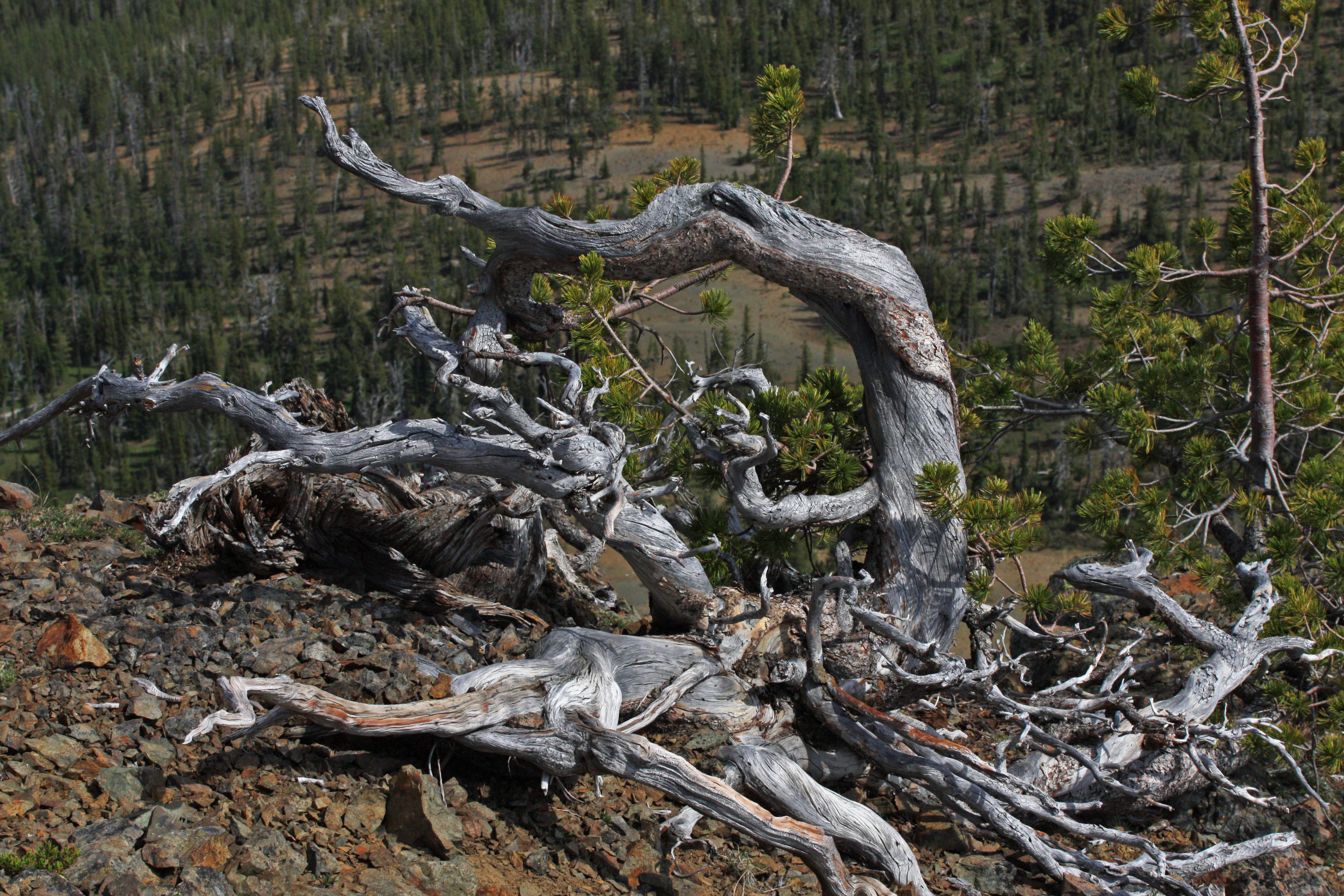
Krummholz Pinus albicaulis in Wenatchee National Forest in north-central Washington, United States

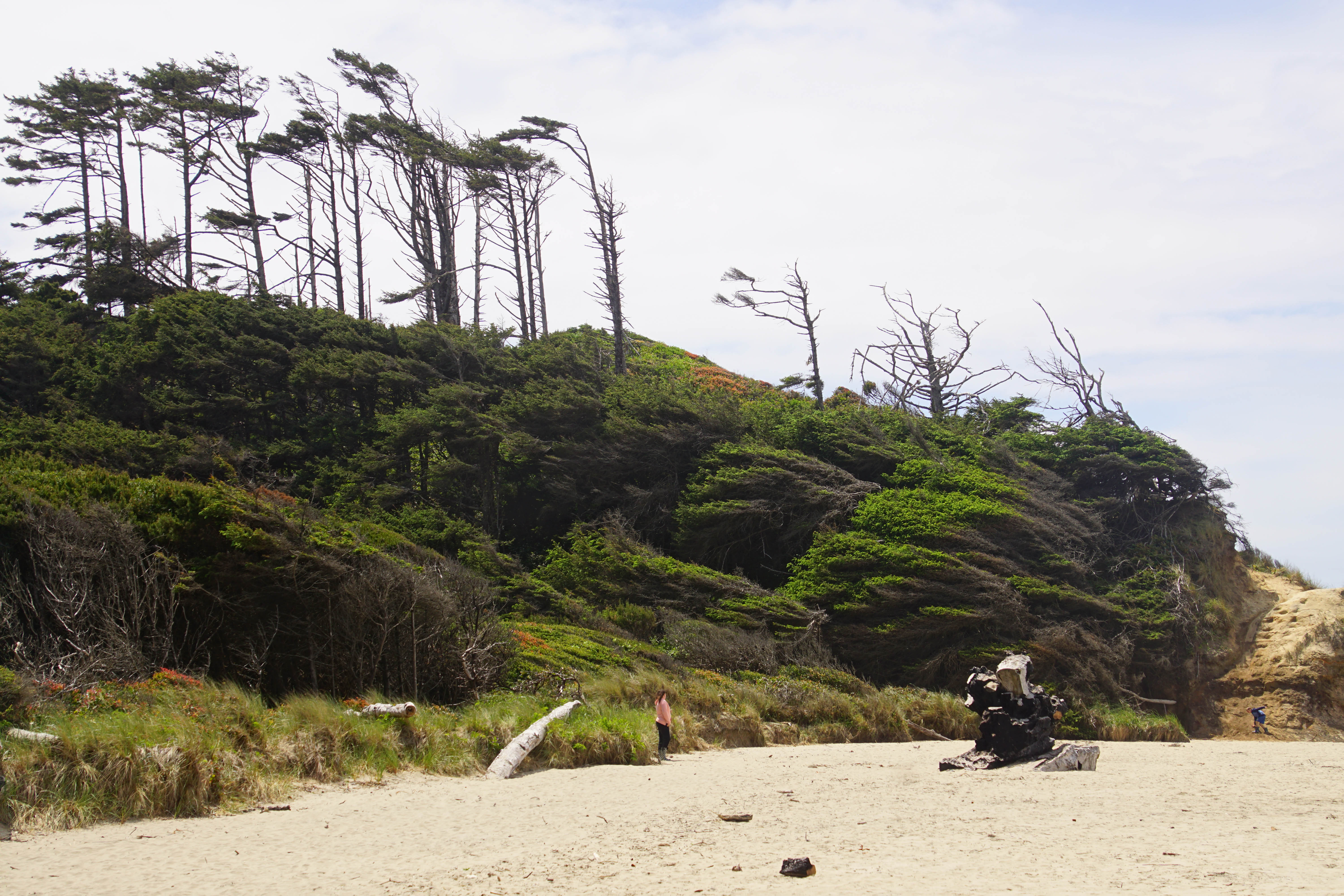
Wind-sculpted krummholz trees, Ona Beach, Oregon, United States

Krummholz /ˈkrʊmˌhoʊlts/ (German: krumm, 'crooked, bent, twisted' and Holz, 'wood')—also called knieholz ('knee timber')—is a type of stunted, deformed vegetation encountered in the subarctic and subalpine tree line landscapes, shaped by continual exposure to fierce, freezing winds. Under these conditions, trees can survive only where they are sheltered by rock formations or snow cover. As the lower portion of these trees continues to grow, the coverage becomes extremely dense near the ground. In Newfoundland and Labrador, the formation is known as tuckamore. Krummholz trees are also found on beaches, such as the Oregon coast, where trees can become much taller than their subalpine cousins.

The labeling of diverse sets of tree species in different ecological contexts may be problematic. The ecological requirements of krummholz trees in the Alps, for example, are different from those in the Rockies. The terms scrub or shrubland may be more appropriate for some communities with krummholz trees.

Krummholz trees can cover nearly all of the area in which they inhabit, with only patches of moss and flowers in between. Frequent fog and cloudy conditions, along with cool weather, create a rather moist microclimate around the shrubs. Krummholz might depend on less acidic soil to survive. This means that they are threatened by acid rain. The thin soils that cover mountaintops have low buffering capacity, that is the capacity to resist changes in acidity. These trees are also endangered by the use of them as timber for fires, and other human activity.

== Species ==
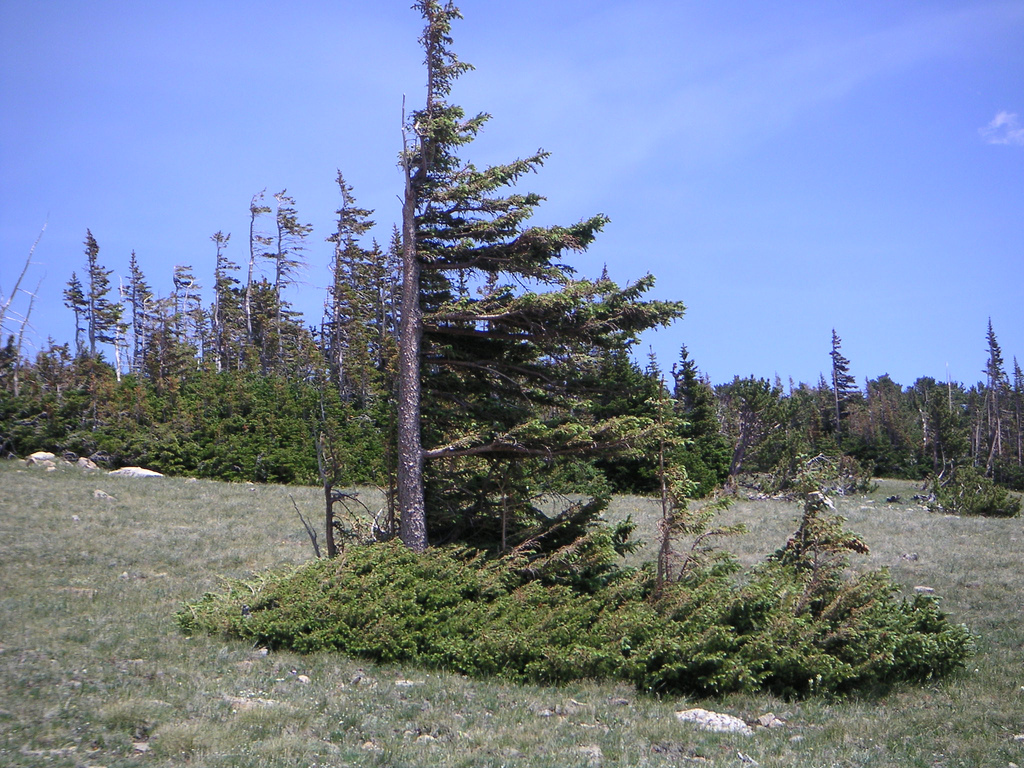
Picea engelmannii flag tree in Colorado, at the tree line

Common trees showing krummholz formation include European spruce, mountain pine, balsam fir, red spruce, black spruce, subalpine fir, subalpine larch, Engelmann spruce, whitebark pine, limber pine, bristlecone pine, and lodgepole pine. Instances of the krummholz form of black spruce, Picea mariana, are found in the northern Canadian boreal forests. Krummholz-form black spruce and balsam fir are abundant in the alpine transition zone of the White Mountains of Maine and New Hampshire and of the same zone in the Green Mountains of Vermont.

Subalpine fir is the most common associate of spruce in krummholz vegetation. Other associated coniferous species include alpine larch (Larix lyallii), whitebark pine (Pinus albicaulis), limber pine (Pinus flexilis), and western white pine (Pinus monticola) in southern British Columbia, and mountain hemlock (Tsuga mertensiana) on the eastern slopes of the Coast Range and in the Revelstoke area of British Columbia. Lodgepole pine (Pinus contorta var. contorta) is a minor associate in most of the British Columbia interior, except in dry alpine areas of the southwest Cariboo/Chilcotin district where it is abundant (Pojar 1985). Ericaceous species (Vaccinium scoparium, V. membranaceum, V. caespitosum, Cassiope mertensiana, Phyllodoce empetriformis) are common in the snow accumulation zone around the base of krummholz colonies. In the coastal Pacific Northwest, douglas fir (Pseudotsuga menziesii) stands at higher elevation also have many examples of krummholz.

In the Alps in Europe, a scrubland of Pinus mugo is described as occupying the area above the tree line. This is formed by variants of the spruce, beech, and rarely the green alder. These European species were first labeled as a "krummholz belt" by scientists. In the Rocky Mountains, several tree species appear in a similar stunted form, such as specific North American variants of spruce, fir, and pine. These formations were sometimes called "elfin-wood" or "wind-timber". However, English-speaking scientists began to refer to these formations as krummholz as well.

== Flag tree ==
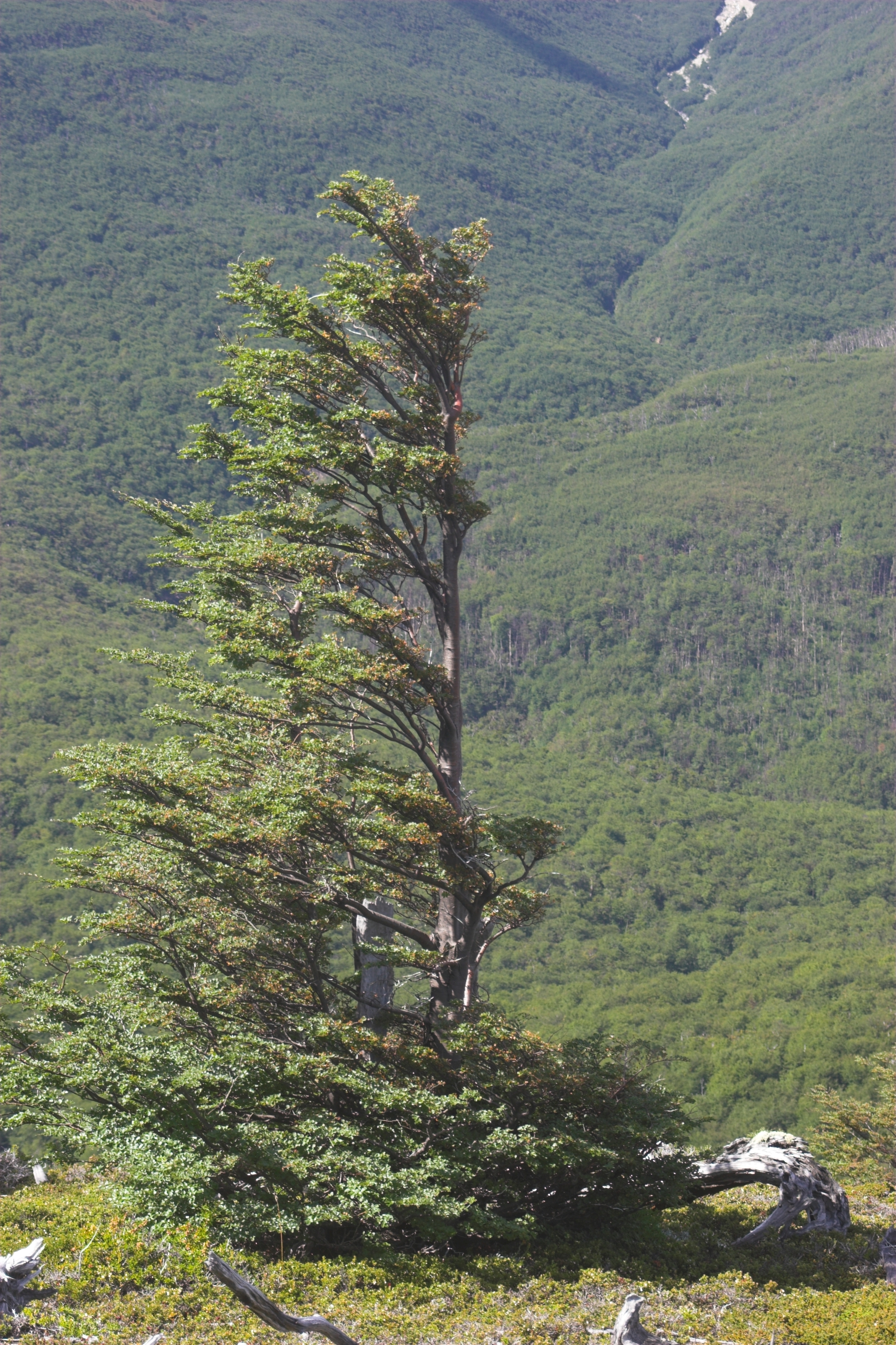
Banner tree, Torres del Paine National Park, Chile

A variation of krummholz formation is a flag tree or banner tree. Branches on the windward side are killed or deformed by the almost constant strong winds, giving the tree a characteristic flag-like appearance. Where the lower portion of the tree is protected by snow cover or rocks, only the exposed upper portion may have this appearance. This is a rather common occurrence in red spruce trees of the highest peaks of the central and even the southern Appalachian Mountains, and is most often seen in the windswept high peaks and plateaus of the Allegheny Mountains. This formation most notably occurs with high frequency in the Dolly Sods and Roaring Plains West Wilderness areas along the Allegheny Front in eastern West Virginia, typically occurring at elevations of 3,800 feet (1,200 m) and higher. Trade winds in tropical regions near the equator can also shape trees in a similar manner. The southernmost reaches of the Magellanic subpolar forests of Chile contain many flag trees also.

== See also ==
- Dwarf forest
- Libidibia coriaria (divi-divi)
- Pinus mugo (scrub mountain pine)
- Reaction wood
- Windthrow
