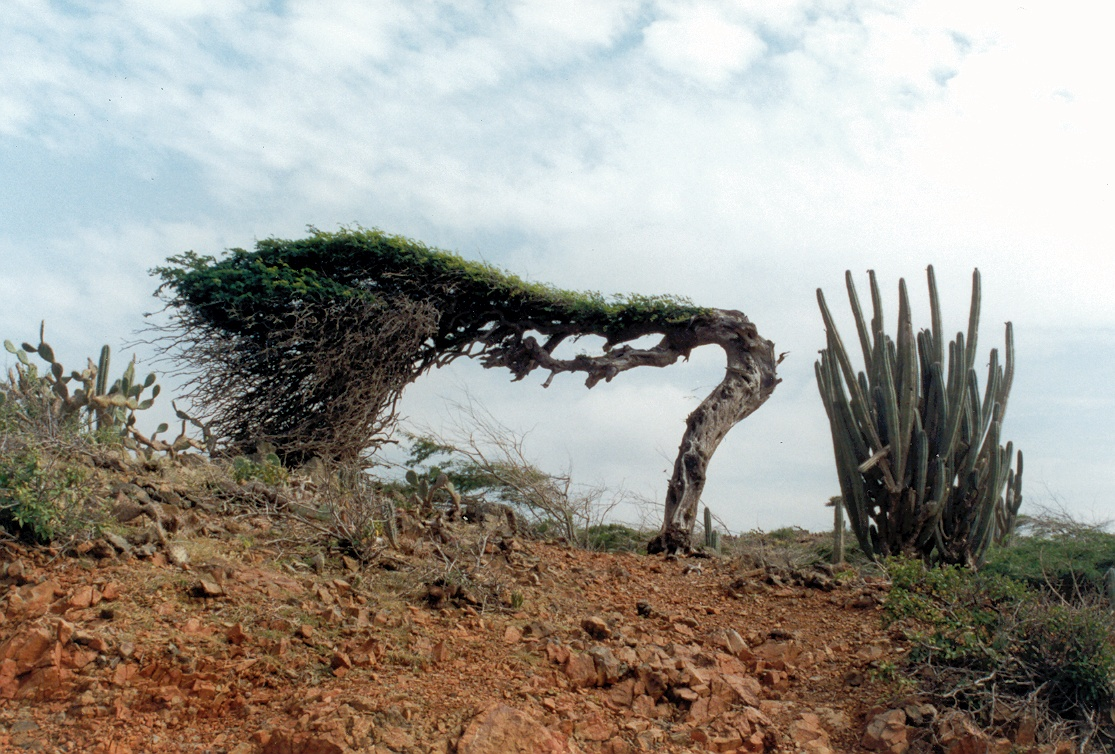
- Divi-divi on Aruba

Conservation status
- Least Concern (IUCN 3.1)

Scientific classification
- Kingdom: Plantae
- Clade: Tracheophytes
- Clade: Angiosperms
- Clade: Eudicots
- Clade: Rosids
- Order: Fabales
- Family: Fabaceae
- Subfamily: Caesalpinioideae
- Genus: Libidibia
- Species: L. coriaria

Binomial name
- Libidibia coriaria (Jacq.) Schltdl.

Synonyms
- Caesalpinia coriacea Poit.; Caesalpinia coriaria (Jacq.) Willd.; Caesalpinia thomaea Spreng.; Poinciana coriaria Jacq.

= Libidibia coriaria =

Divi-divi

Species of legume

Libidibia coriaria, synonym Caesalpinia coriaria, is a leguminous tree or large shrub native to the Caribbean, Central America, Mexico, and northern and western South America. Common names include divi-divi, cascalote, guaracabuya, guatapana, nacascol, tan yong, and watapana (Aruba).

== Description ==
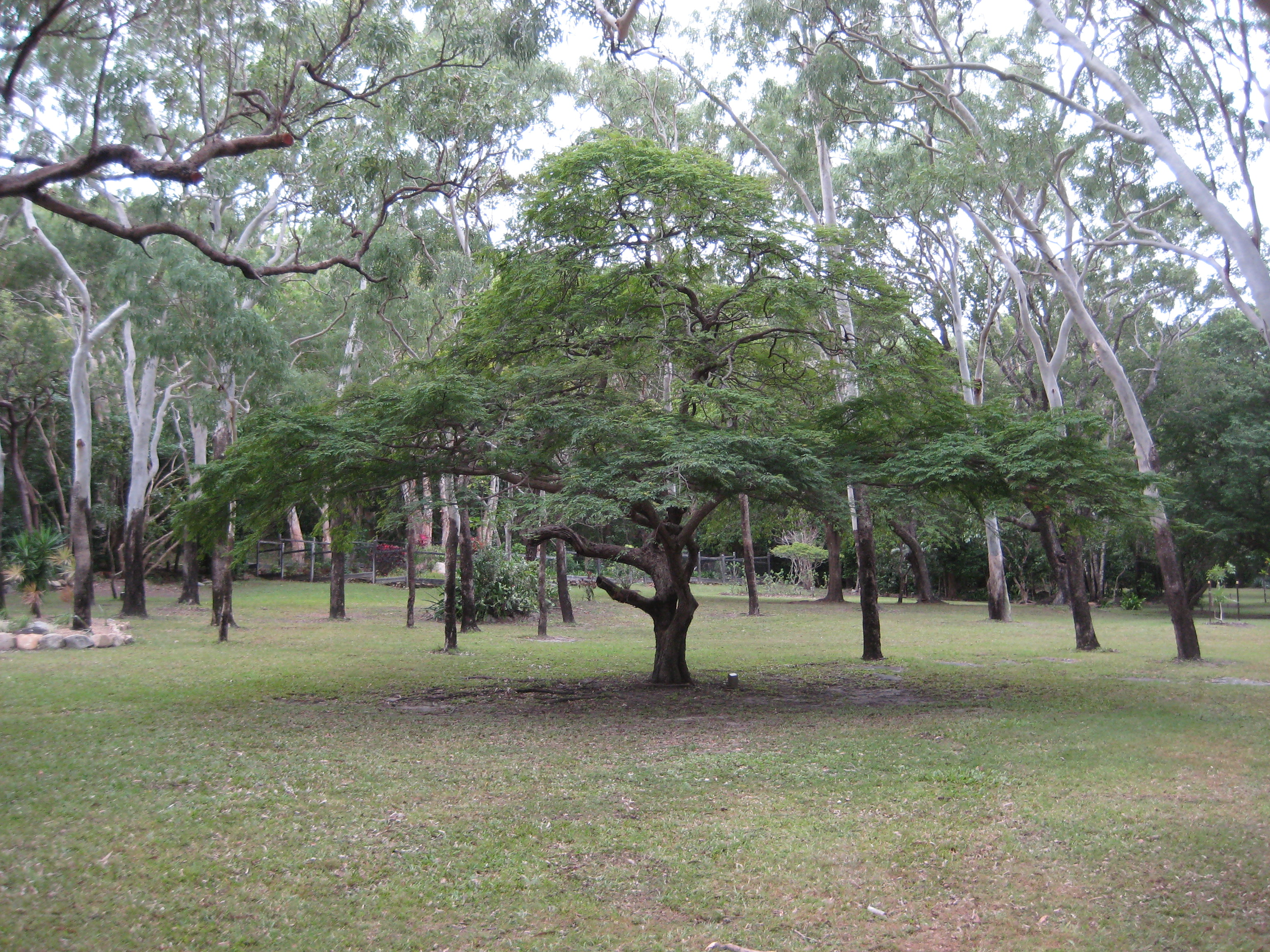
With developed canopy

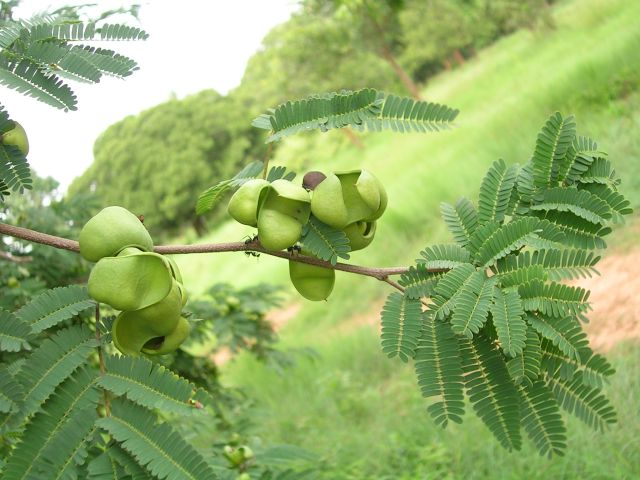
Leaves and pod

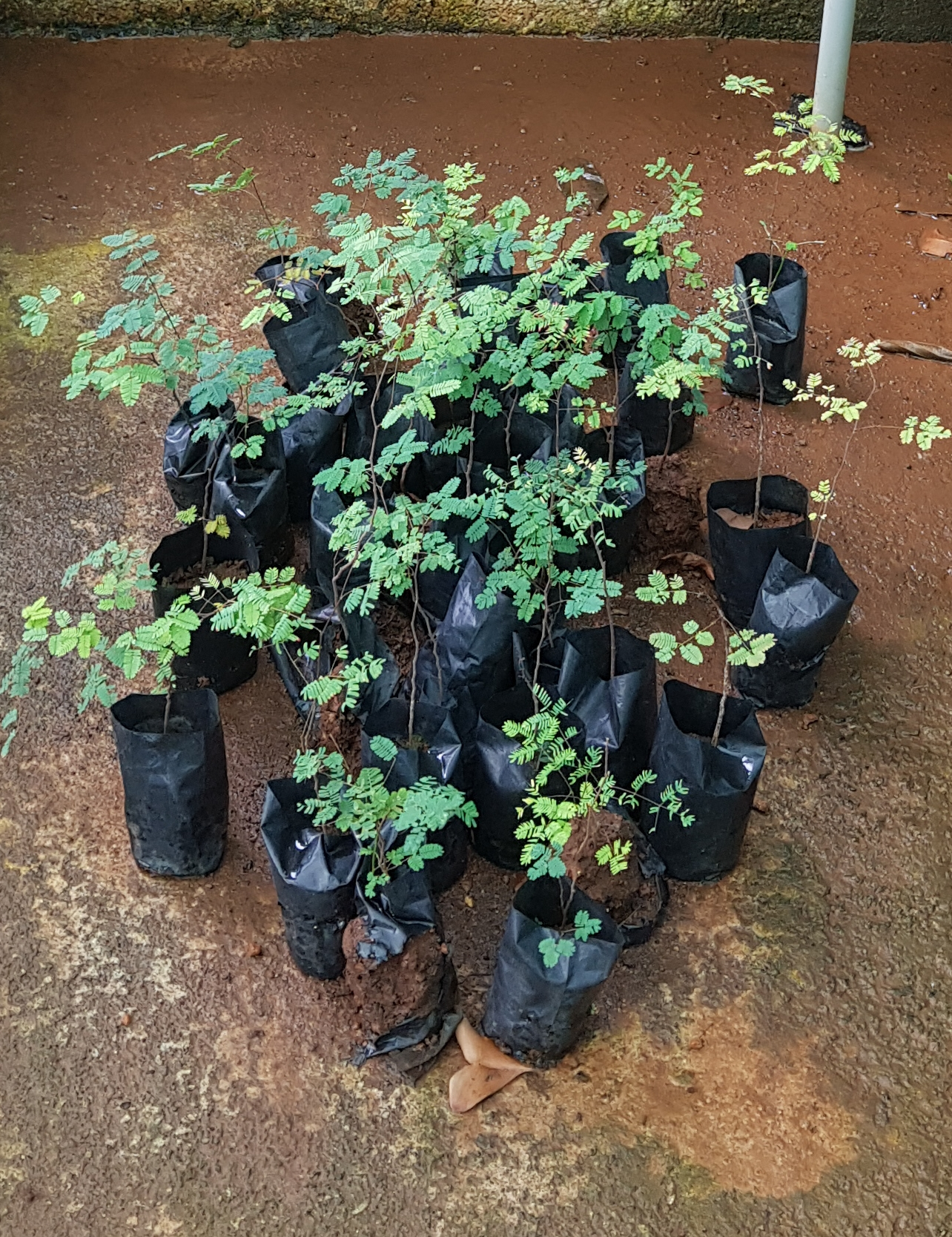
Plants

L. coriaria rarely reaches its maximum height of 9 m (30 ft) because its growth is contorted by the trade winds that batter the exposed coastal sites where it often grows. In other environments it grows into a low dome shape with a clear sub canopy space. Leaves are bipinnate, with 5–10 pairs of pinnae, each pinna with 15–25 pairs of leaflets; the individual leaflets are 7 mm long and 2 mm broad. The fruit is a twisted pod 5 cm (2.0 in) long.

== Taxonomy ==
The species was first described by Nikolaus Joseph von Jacquin in 1763, as Poinciana coriaria. In 1799, Carl Ludwig Willdenow transferred it to the genus Caesalpinia, and in 1830, Diederich von Schlechtendal transferred it to his newly created genus Libidibia. The genus Libidibia was not always accepted and the species was usually placed in Caesalpinia, until molecular phylogenetic studies led to the reinstatement of Libidibia.

== Chemistry ==
Tannins are extracted from divi-divi pods for use in leather production.

Among the molecules isolated is corilagin, whose name comes from the specific epithet of the plant.

== In culture ==
Divi-divi is the national tree of Curaçao. It is also very common and popular on Aruba.

== Uses ==
According to the FAO's Ecocrop database, the pods provide tannin and a black dye used in the tanning industry and for ink. The pods also have medicinal properties. The hard, dark colored wood is used for carpentry. The tree can be planted for shade. Yields of pods may be 45–135 kg per tree per year.

== See also ==
- Krummholz
- Reaction wood
- National Festival of the Dividivi
