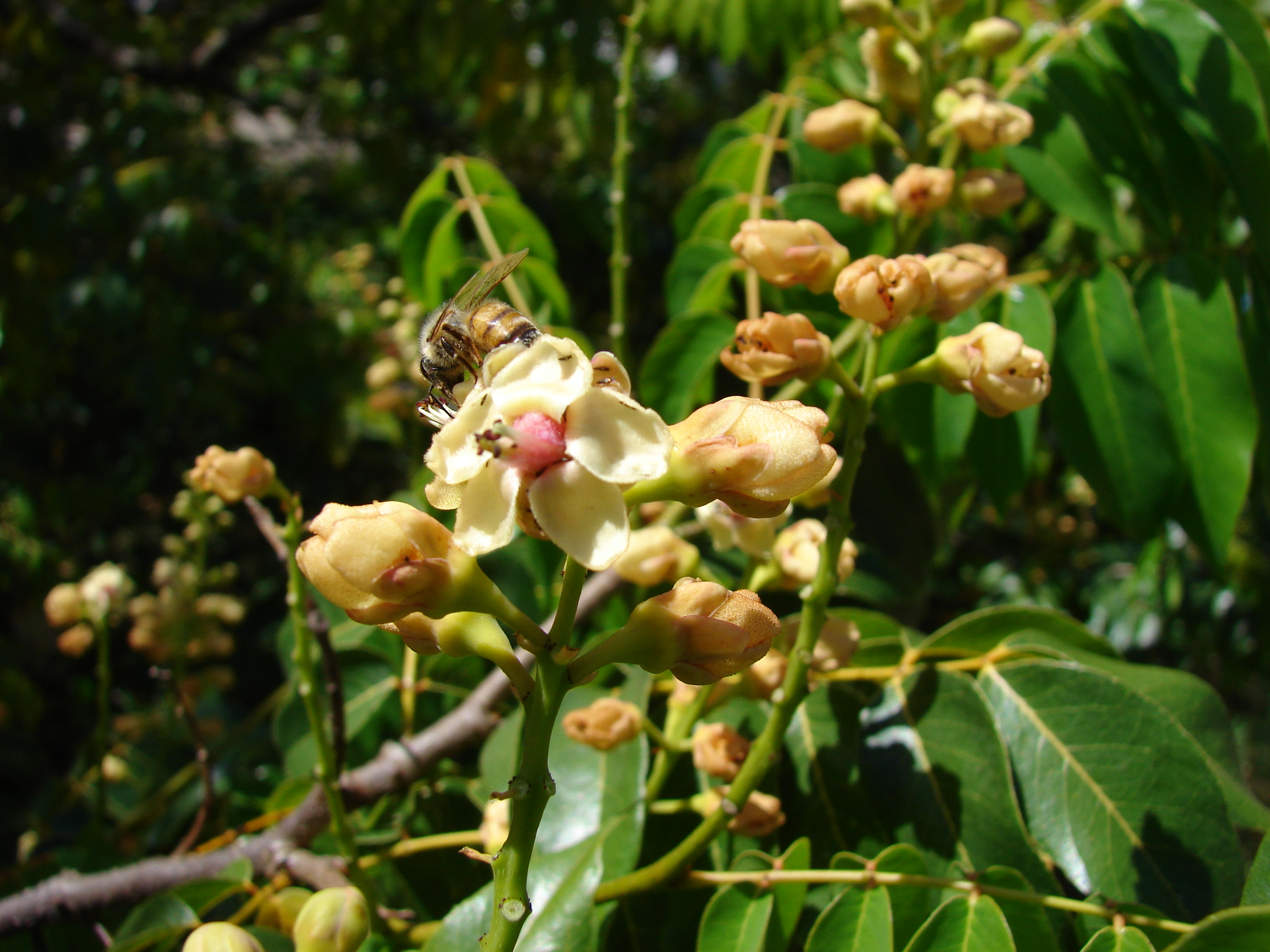

Conservation status
- Endangered (IUCN 2.3)

- Threatened (ESA)

Scientific classification
- Kingdom: Plantae
- Clade: Tracheophytes
- Clade: Angiosperms
- Clade: Eudicots
- Clade: Rosids
- Order: Fabales
- Family: Fabaceae
- Subfamily: Caesalpinioideae
- Genus: Libidibia
- Species: L. monosperma

Binomial name
- Libidibia monosperma (Tul.) E. Gagnon & G. P. Lewis

Synonyms
- Caesalpinia monosperma Tul.; Stahlia maritima Bello; Stahlia monosperma (Tul.) Urb; Stahlia monosperma var. domingensis Standl

= Libidibia monosperma =

Cóbana negra

Species of legume

Libidibia monosperma is a species of legume in the family Fabaceae, with the common names cóbana negra and cóbana polisandro. It is found in the Dominican Republic, Puerto Rico, and the United States Virgin Islands. It is a federally listed threatened species of the United States.
