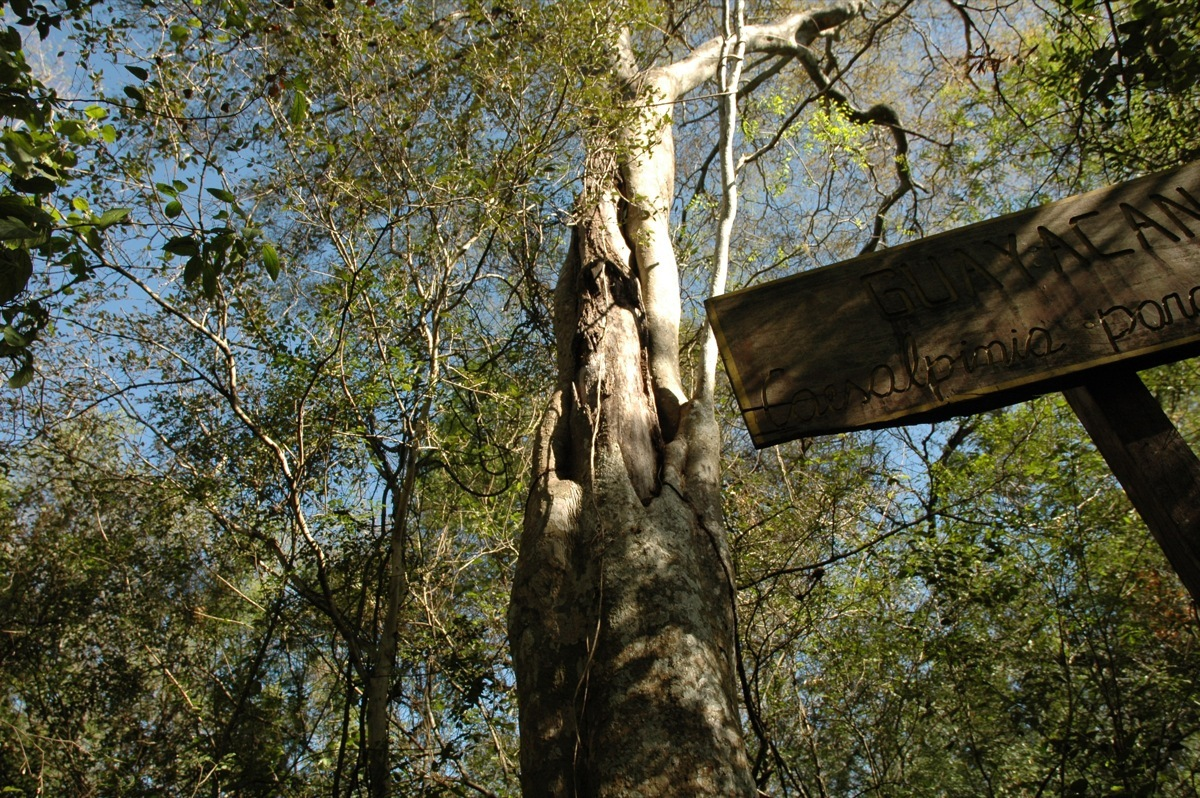
- Libidibia paraguariensis in Chaco National Park

Scientific classification
- Kingdom: Plantae
- Clade: Tracheophytes
- Clade: Angiosperms
- Clade: Eudicots
- Clade: Rosids
- Order: Fabales
- Family: Fabaceae
- Subfamily: Caesalpinioideae
- Tribe: Caesalpinieae
- Genus: Libidibia; Schltdl. (1830)

Type species
- Libidibia coriaria (Jacq.) Schltdl.

Species
- See text.

Synonyms
- Caesalpinia section Libidibia DC.; Stahlia Bello (1881)

= Libidibia =

Genus of legumes

Libidibia is a genus of flowering plants in the family Fabaceae. It includes seven species of trees and shrubs native to the tropical Americas, ranging from northern Mexico to northern Argentina. Typical habitats include seasonally-dry tropical forest and scrub, thorn forest (including caatinga), and savanna woodland. It belongs to the subfamily Caesalpinioideae.

== Species ==
Libidibia comprises the following species:

- Libidibia coriaria (Jacq.) Schltdl.—divi-divi (Mexico, Central America, the Caribbean, northern South America)
- Libidibia ferrea (Mart. ex Tul.) L.P.Queiroz—Brazilian ironwood, leopard tree
  - var. ferrea (Mart. ex Tul.) L.P.Queiroz
  - var. glabrescens (Benth.) L.P.Queiroz
  - var. leiostachya (Benth.) L.P.Queiroz
  - var. parvifolia (Benth.) L.P.Queiroz
- Libidibia glabrata (Kunth) C.Cast. & G.P.Lewis
- Libidibia monosperma (Tul.) Gagnon & G.P.Lewis
- Libidibia paraguariensis (D.Parodi) G.P.Lewis—ibirá-berá, guayacaú negro, Argentinian brown ebony (Argentina, Bolivia, Brazil, Paraguay)
- Libidibia punctata (Willd.) Britton—quebrahacha
- Libidibia sclerocarpa (Standl.) Britton & Rose
