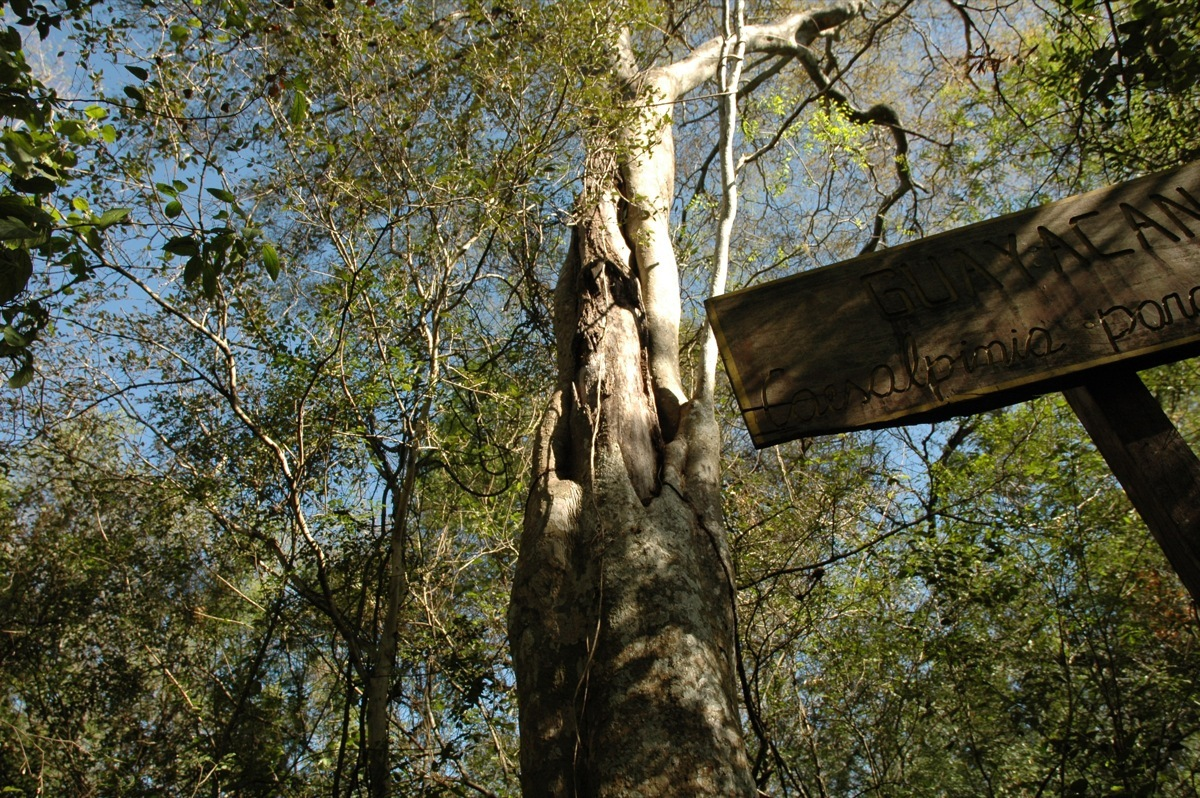
- Libidibia paraguariensis (Caesalpinia paraguariensis) in National park Chaco

Conservation status
- Vulnerable (IUCN 2.3)

Scientific classification
- Kingdom: Plantae
- Clade: Tracheophytes
- Clade: Angiosperms
- Clade: Eudicots
- Clade: Rosids
- Order: Fabales
- Family: Fabaceae
- Subfamily: Caesalpinioideae
- Genus: Libidibia
- Species: L. paraguariensis

Binomial name
- Libidibia paraguariensis (D.Parodi) G.P.Lewis

Synonyms
- Acacia paraguariensis D.Parodi; Caesalpinia melanocarpa Griseb.; Caesalpinia paraguariensis (D.Parodi) Burkart

= Libidibia paraguariensis =

Species of legume

Libidibia paraguariensis (the guayacaú negro or ibirá-berá) is a species of legume in the family Fabaceae. It is found in Argentina, Bolivia, Brazil, and Paraguay. It is threatened by habitat loss. Guayacaú negro is used for timber in several Latin American countries, especially Argentina and Paraguay. Commercially it is marketed as Argentinian brown ebony, mistakenly as Brazilian ebony, and as a family group as partridgewood. The end use for this timber is typically high-end exotic hardwood flooring, cabinetry and turnings.

Its flowers are very attractive to bees.
