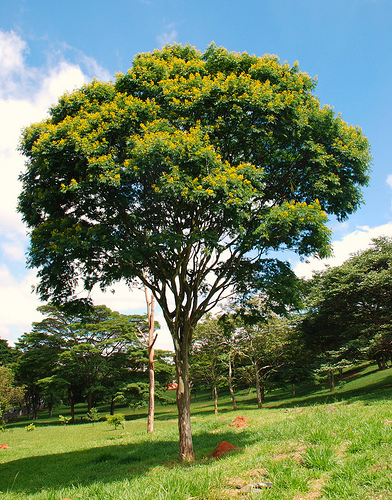

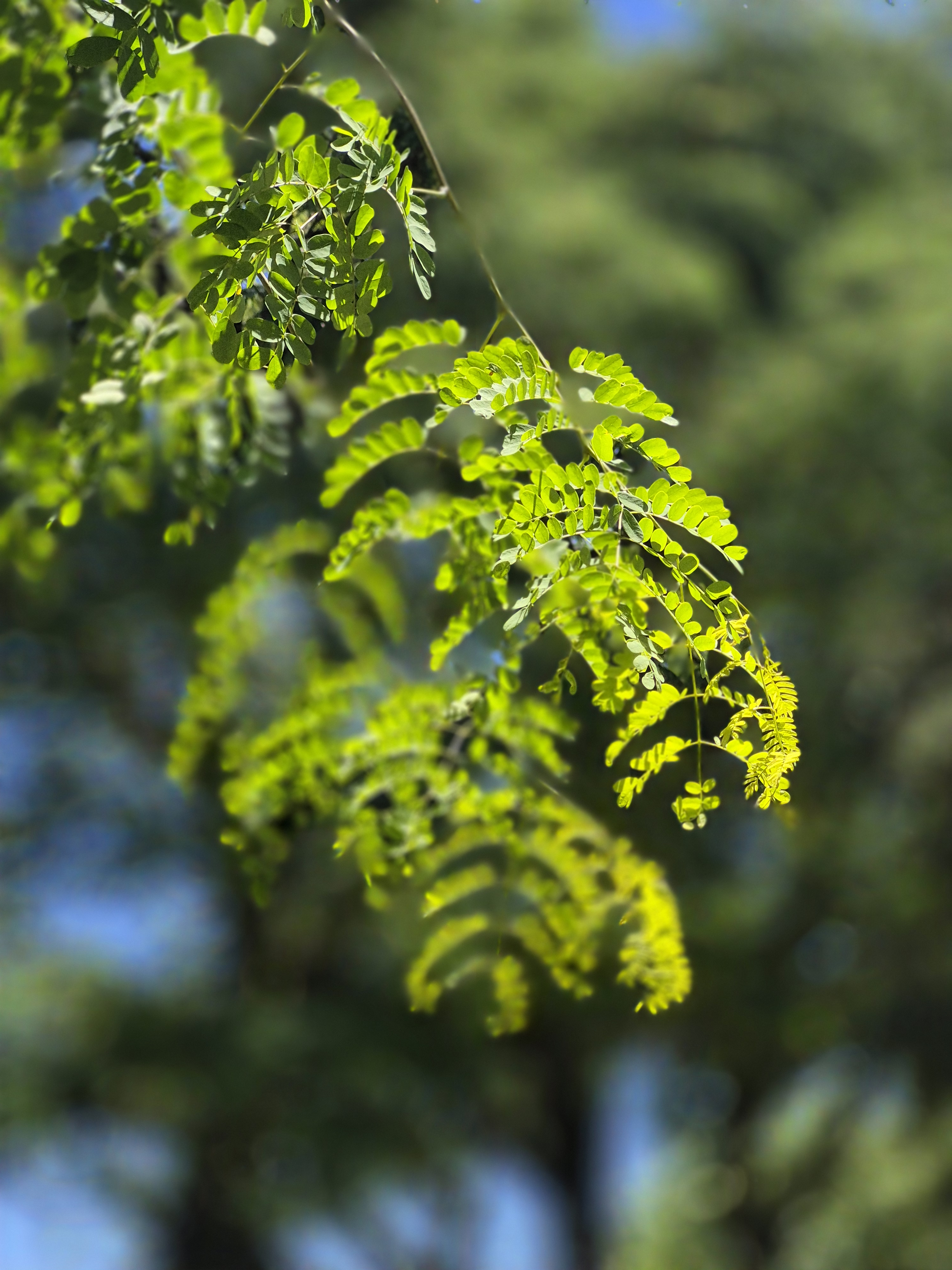
- Leaves of cutivated tree in Brazil.

Conservation status
- Least Concern (IUCN 3.1)

Scientific classification
- Kingdom: Plantae
- Clade: Tracheophytes
- Clade: Angiosperms
- Clade: Eudicots
- Clade: Rosids
- Order: Fabales
- Family: Fabaceae
- Subfamily: Caesalpinioideae
- Genus: Libidibia
- Species: L. ferrea

Binomial name
- Libidibia ferrea (Mart. ex Tul.) L.P.Queiroz

Synonyms
- Apuleia ferrea (Mart. ex Tul.) Baill.; Caesalpinia ferrea Mart. ex Tul.

= Libidibia ferrea =

Species of legume

Libidibia ferrea, formerly Caesalpinia ferrea, and commonly known as Brazilian ironwood, leopardtree or jucá, is a tree found in Brazil.

== Wood ==
Most species of Caesalpinia s.l. have poorly defined growth rings, with isolated vessels arranged in radial multiples. Pitting between vessels is alternate and covered, and fibres are generally not divided by a septum. The axial (i.e., longitudinal) parenchyma varies from a winged shape to confluent, and is irregularly storied (i.e., layered), while the rays (perpendicular to growth rings) are of variable height and generally comprise a single or double cell width. Libidibia in particular has layered longitudinal parenchyma and narrow homocellular (i.e., of uniform type) rays without crystals in the ray cells.

== Uses ==
In the Amazon region, Libidibia ferrea has extensive use in popular medicine, known mainly as "jucá", being indicated to treat several health conditions, in the form of teas and infusions to treat bronchopulmonary conditions, diabetes, rheumatism, cancer, disorders gastrointestinal, diarrhea; in addition to topical treatment of wounds and bruises. Although it has many indications of use for treating different diseases, jucá pods are mainly used by the Amazon people for the treatment of wounds, usually in alcoholic solution, and scientific studies have already shown the healing activity of different parts of jucá in different animal species, such as goats, rats and donkeys. A recent study that compared different formulations and concentrations of the ethanolic extract from jucá (Libidibia ferrea) pods showed that the natural products showed excellent healing activity in open dermal wounds in dogs, and also had moderate in vitro antimicrobial activity.

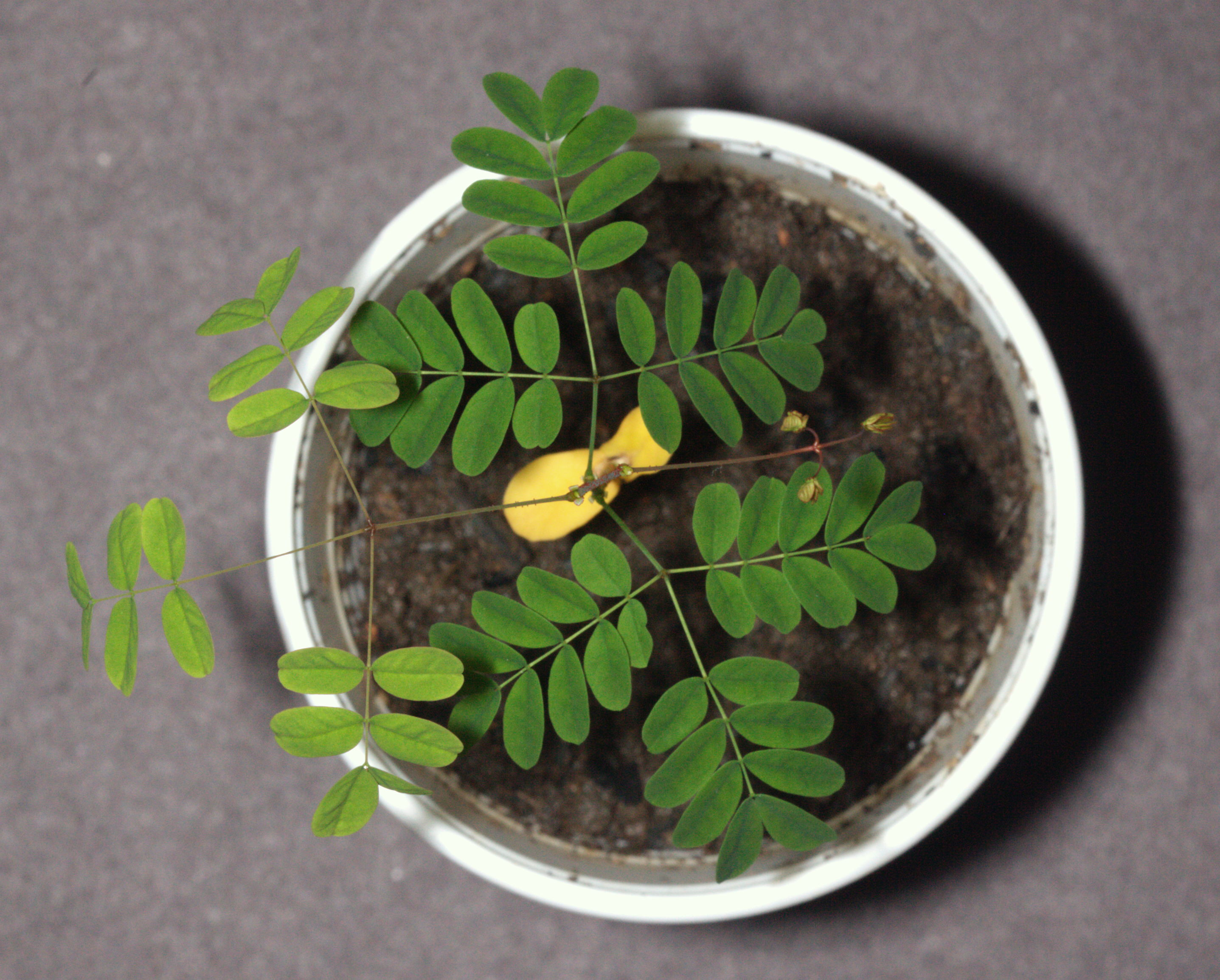
A two-week-old specimen grown from harvested seed

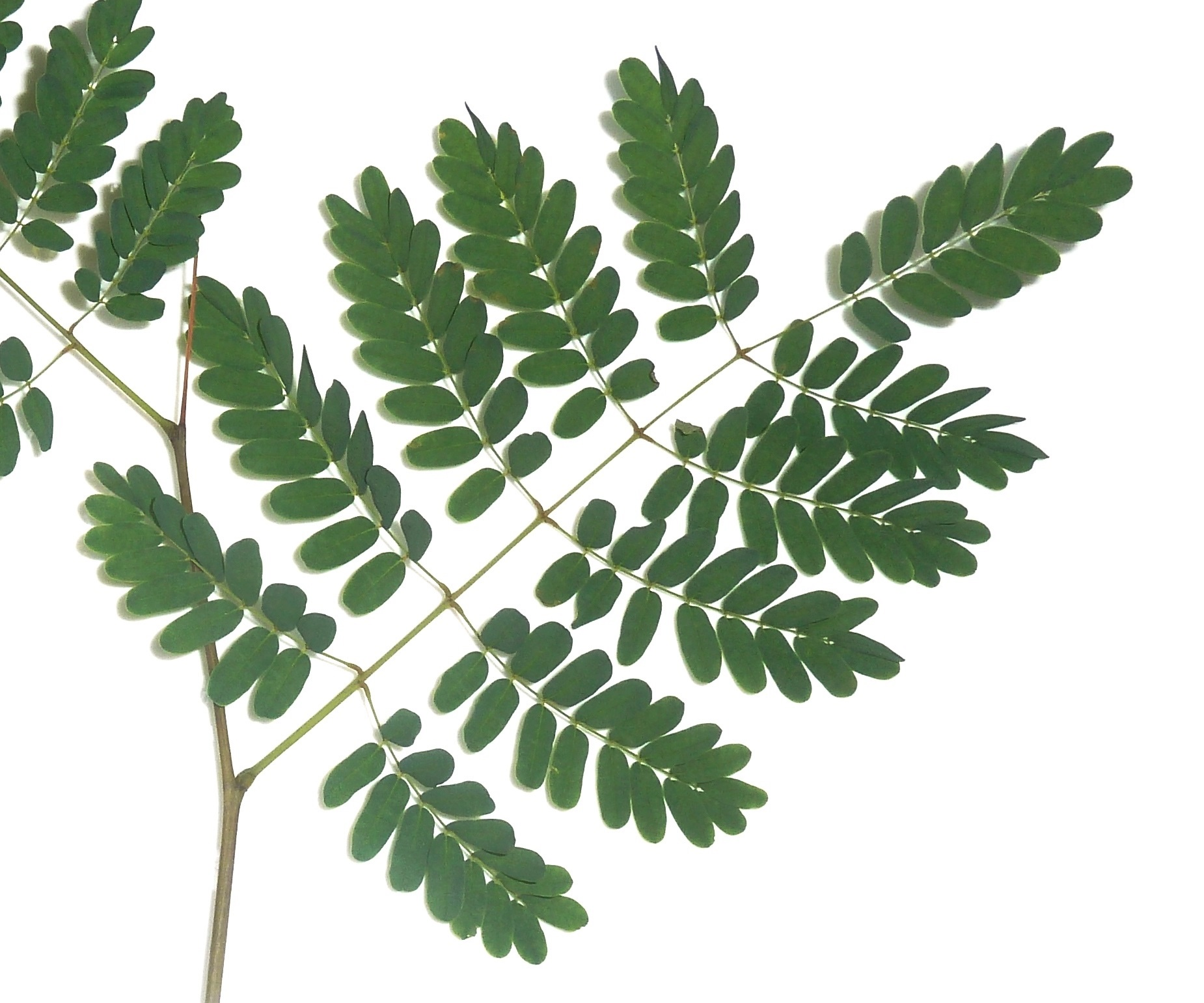
Bipinnately compound leaf

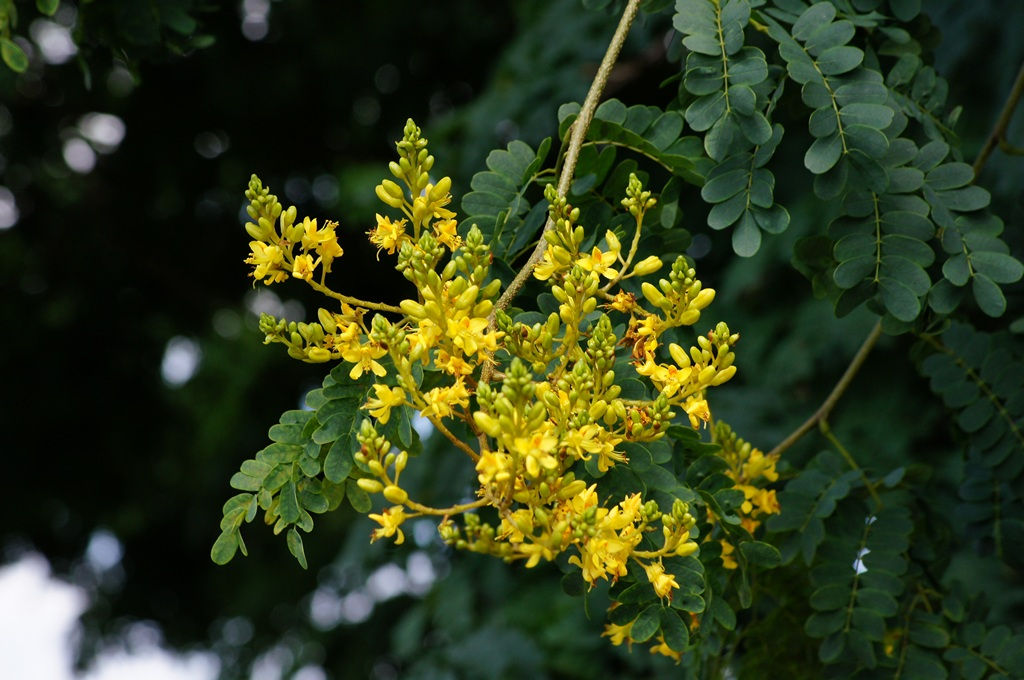
Inflorescences

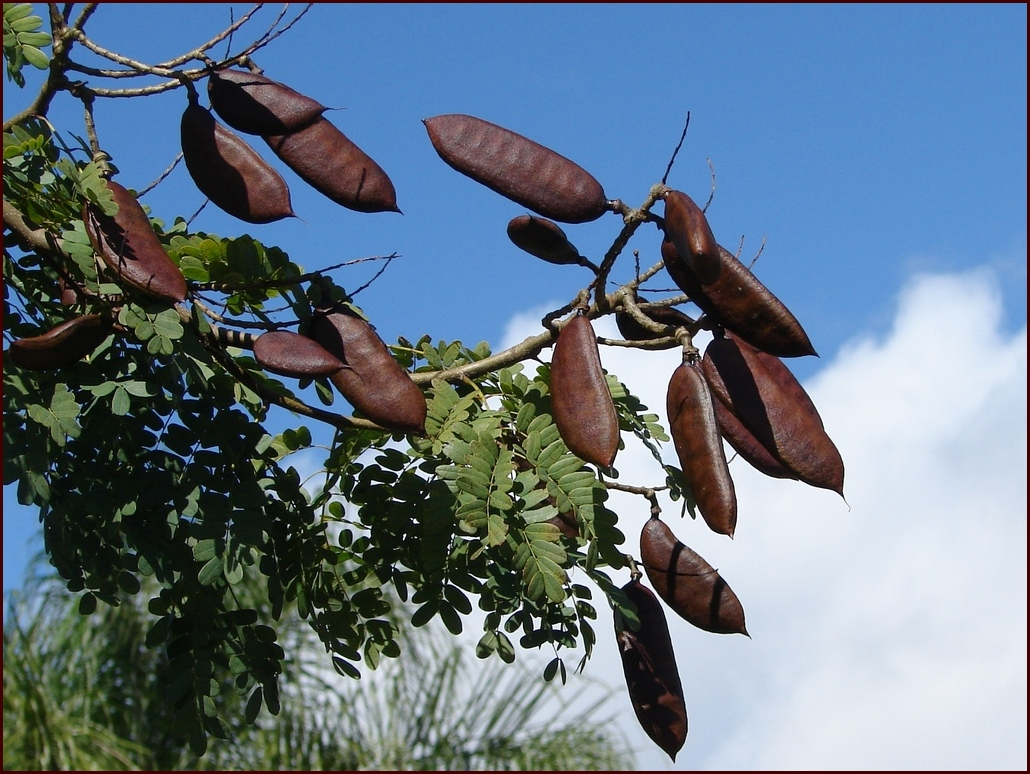
Seed pods
